= Santa Chiara, Urbania =

Church in Urbania, Italy

Santa Chiara is a former Roman Catholic church and convent in the urban center Urbania, region of Marche, Italy. A convent of Clarissan nuns still exists outside of the town.

== History ==
A Clarissan community was putatively located here by nuns from San Damiano in Assisi in the 13th century. The structure dates to the reconstruction of the town after 1277, and was consecrated by 1339. The complex was refurbished in 1623–1626, with the patronage of Francesco Maria II della Rovere but with some interruptions has held Clarissan nuns until 1975.

The initial architect is said to have been Girolamo Genga. This part of the convent now functions as the Istituto Tecnico Commerciale per Geometri “Francesco Maria II Della Rovere”.

The convent has frescoes by Giorgio Picchi. The main altar houses a Madonna and Child with Saints (1629) by Girolamo Cialdieri. In the church are frescoes by Giovanni Francesco Guerrieri, Luzio Dolci and Giustino Episcopio. It also contains an altarpiece by Domenico Peruzzini. Some of the frescoes have been transferred to the town's civic gallery. The church contains tombs of the ruling Ubaldini family, including Count Bernardino (died 1686), his wife and children.
