= Piero da Rimini =

Italian painter

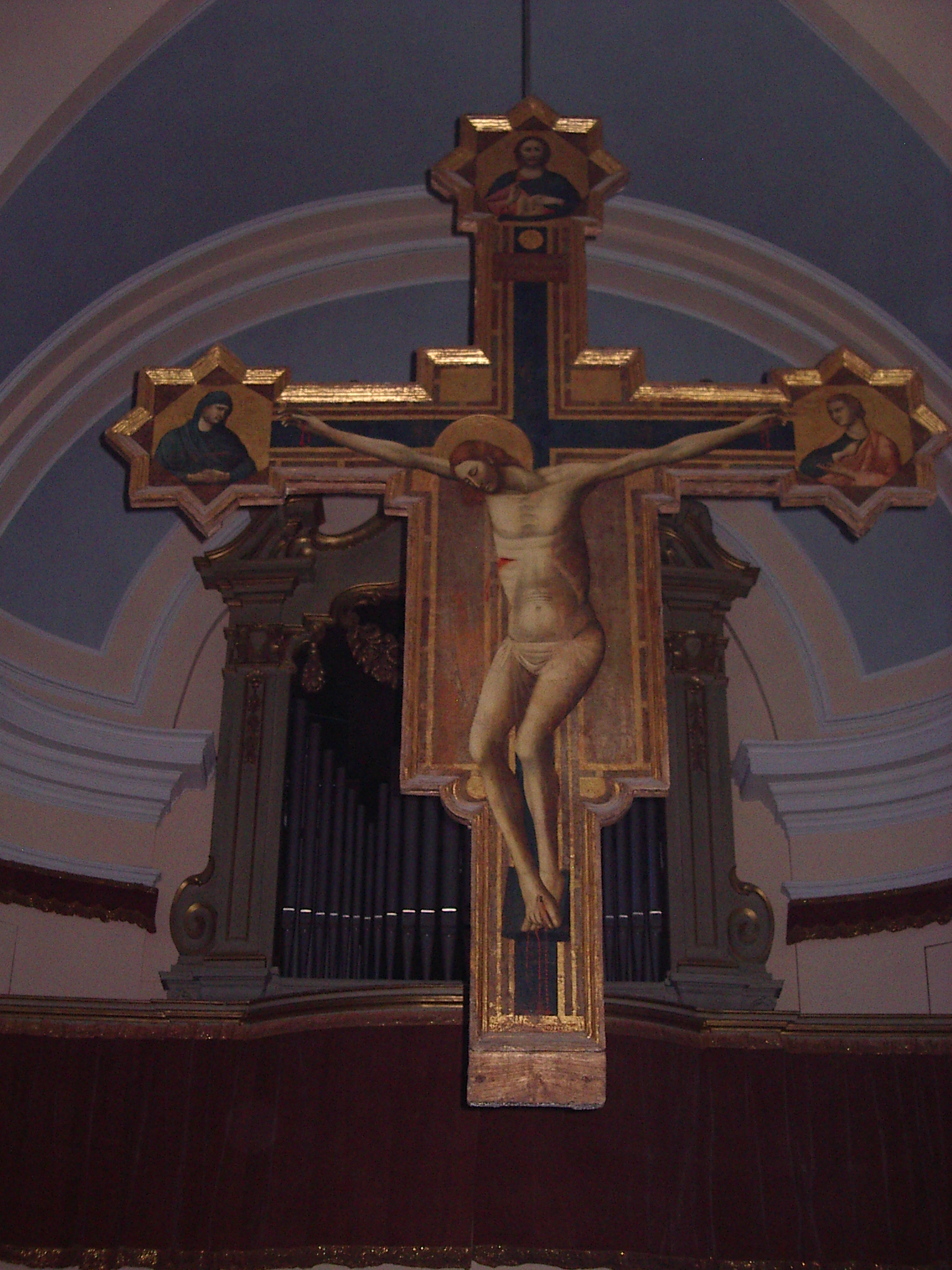
Crucifixion of Urbania

Pietro da Rimini lived in the early 14th century, and is known for his work Crucifixion, which is located in Urbania, near Urbino. Paintings in the church of S. Maria Portofuori in Ravenna are also attributed to him.
