= Oratory of St Joseph, Urbino =

Religious building in Urbino, Italy

Coordinates: 43°43′32.73″N 12°38′04.70″E

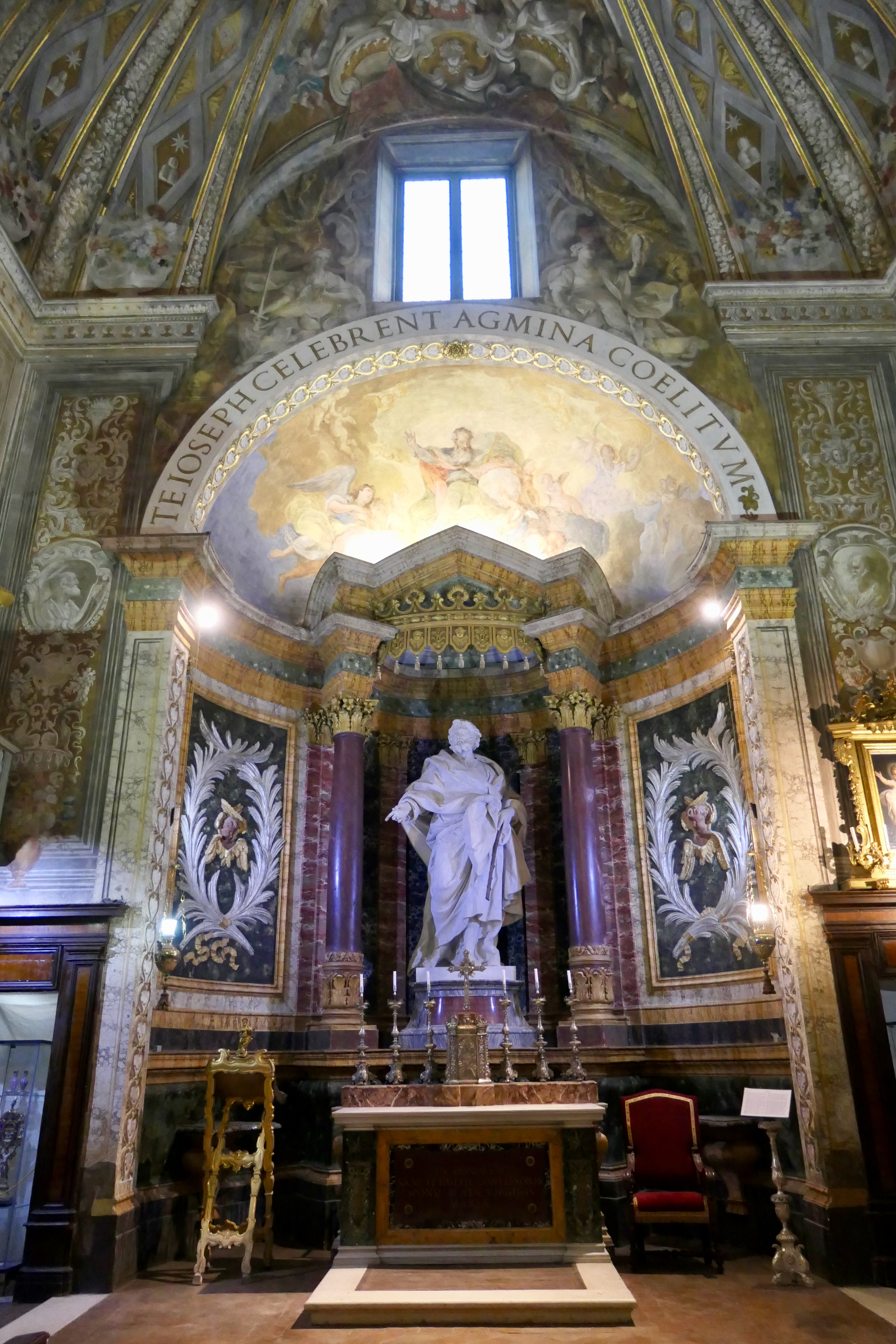
Oratorio di San Giuseppe

The Oratory of St Joseph (Oratorio di Santo Giuseppe) is a series of two 16th-century small oratories or prayer halls located in Via Francesco Barocci #57, in Urbino, Region of the Marche, Italy.

== History ==
It was built from 1503 to 1515 for a confraternity founded in 1500 by the Franciscan friar Gerolamo Recalchi of Verona. The confraternity had the patronage of Guidobaldo I da Montefeltro and Elisabetta Gonzaga. The oratory was refurbished in the 1680s, with the patronage of the aristocratic Albani family of Urbino. Among former brothers of the confraternity were numbered artists from the family of the Viti, Urbani, Brandani, and Roncalli. Other members included the Duke Francesco Maria I Della Rovere and James III Stuart.

The oratory has a Presepe (1545) by Federico Brandani, and a bas-relief of a Madonna and Child by Domenico Roselli. Other decorations include paintings by Carlo Roncalli and sculptures of St Joseph by Giuseppe Lironi and a Madonna col Bambino (1730) by Maurizio Sparagnini. In the sacristy, some landscapes were painted by Alessio De Marchis.
