= Picchi =

Picchi (meaning "peaks" or "woodpecker") is an Italian surname:

- Andrea Picchi (1823 – ?), Italian ebonist
- Armando Picchi (1935 – 1971), Italian football player and coach
- Giorgio Picchi (1586 - 1599), Italian painter
- Giovanni Picchi (1571 or 1572 – 17 May 1643), Italian composer
- Guglielmo Picchi (1973 - ), Italian politician
- Mario Picchi, Italian religious leader, founder of Centro Italiano di Solidarietà (CeIS) to combat drug addiction and promote wellness (see Streetwise priests)
- Mirto Picchi (1915 - 1980), Italian dramatic tenor
- Armando Picchi Calcio, Italian association football club in Livorno
- Stadio Armando Picchi, stadium in Livorno, Italy
