= Girolamo Cialdieri =

Italian painter

Girolamo Cialdieri (1593–1680) was an Italian painter of the Baroque period, born in Urbino. He was a pupil of Claudio Ridolfi, a prominent artist of the time. Cialdieri was known for his facility with color and his ability to integrate landscapes and architectural elements into his works, which gave depth and complexity to his compositions. One of his significant works is the Martyrdom of St. John, located in the church of San Bartolommeo. His artistic style included frescoes and paintings for various churches and convents across Italy, particularly in regions like Cagli and Acqualagna. Notable commissions include works for the Sanctuary of the Madonna del Pelingo and several churches in towns like Montemaggiore and Urbania. His contributions to religious art, including scenes from the lives of saints and the Holy Family, highlight his deep connection to Baroque themes of spirituality and dramatic expression.

== Biography ==
He was born in Urbino and there a pupil of the Veronese Claudio Ridolfi. One of his masterworks is the Martyrdom of St. John in San Bartolommeo. Lanzi describes him as possessing great facility of hand and amenity of color, and commends his style of painting landscape and architecture, which he was fond of introducing in the backgrounds of his pictures.

Among his other works are paintings or frescoes for the Sanctuary of the Madonna del Pelingo in Acqualagna; for churches and convents in Cagli, including San Giuseppe, Santa Maria della Misericordia, and the Capuchin church and convent of the Madonna of the Rosary; the church of the Annunziata in Isola del Piano; Santa Maria del Soccorso in Montemaggiore al Metauro; Santa Chiara in Urbania; and San Stefano in Piobbico.

== Gallery ==
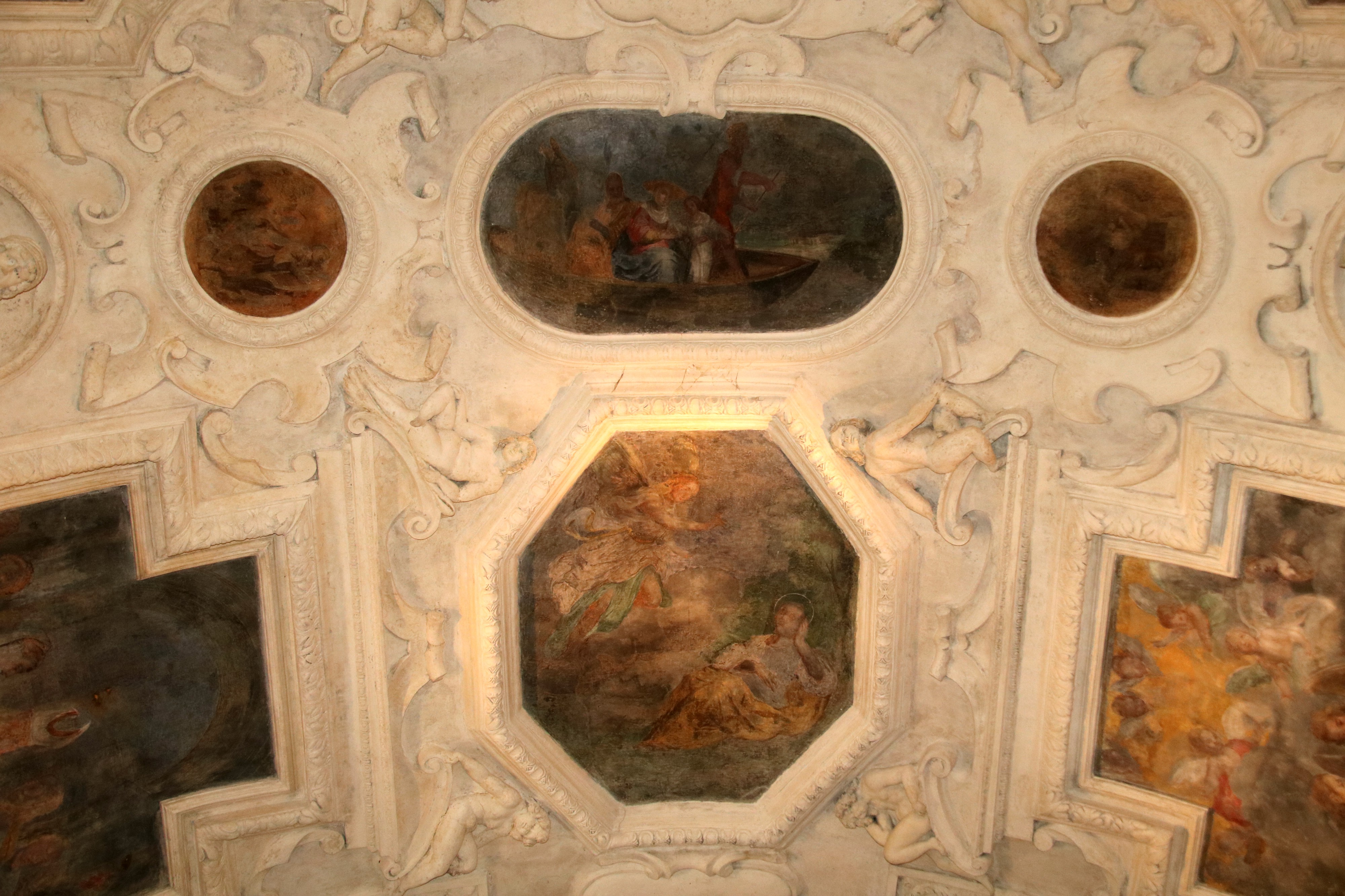
Dream of St. Joseph with the angel inviting him to marry the Virgin and Return of the Holy Family from Egypt

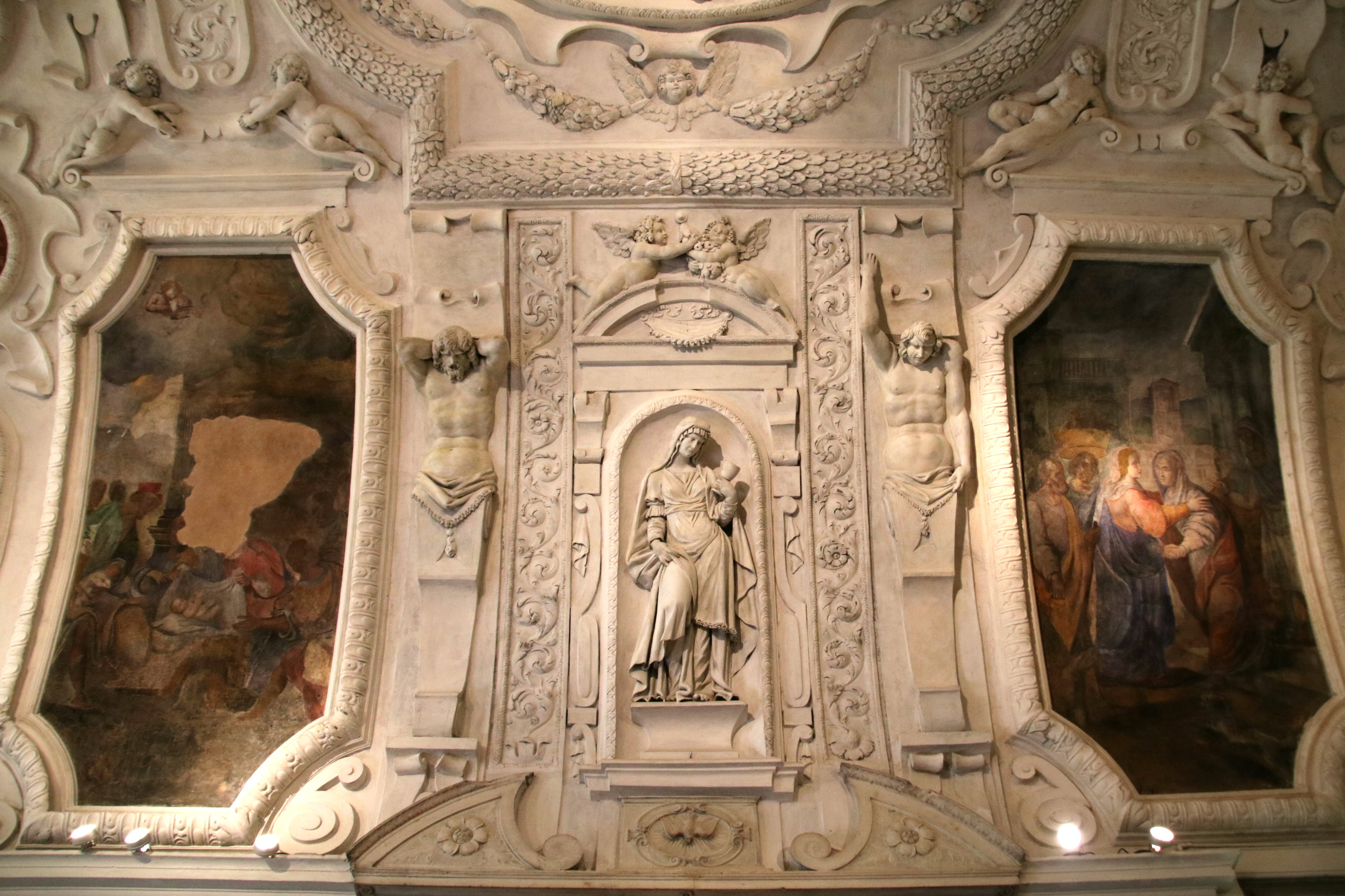
Adoration of the Shepherds and Visitation

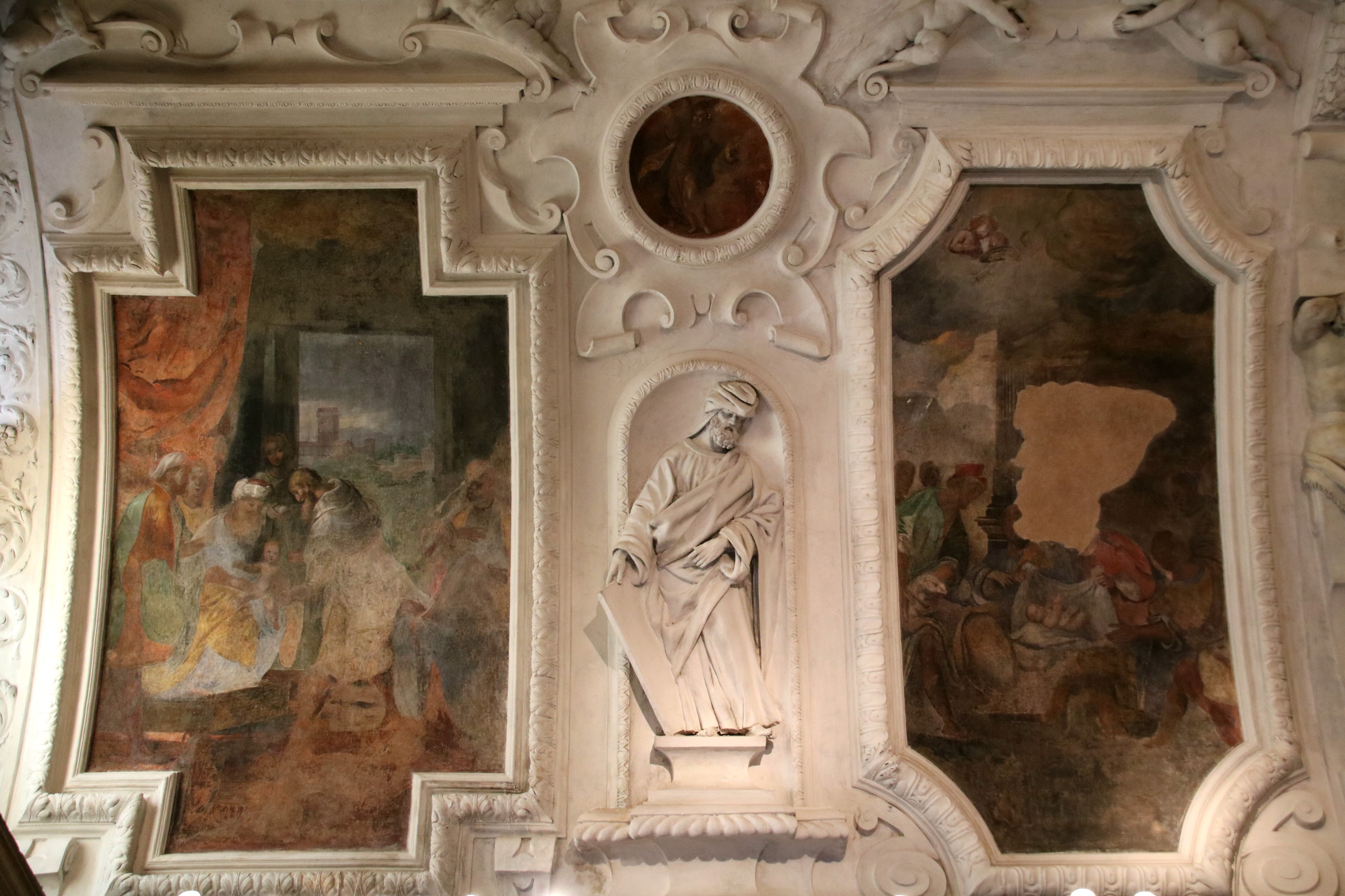
Circumcision and Adoration of the Shepherds

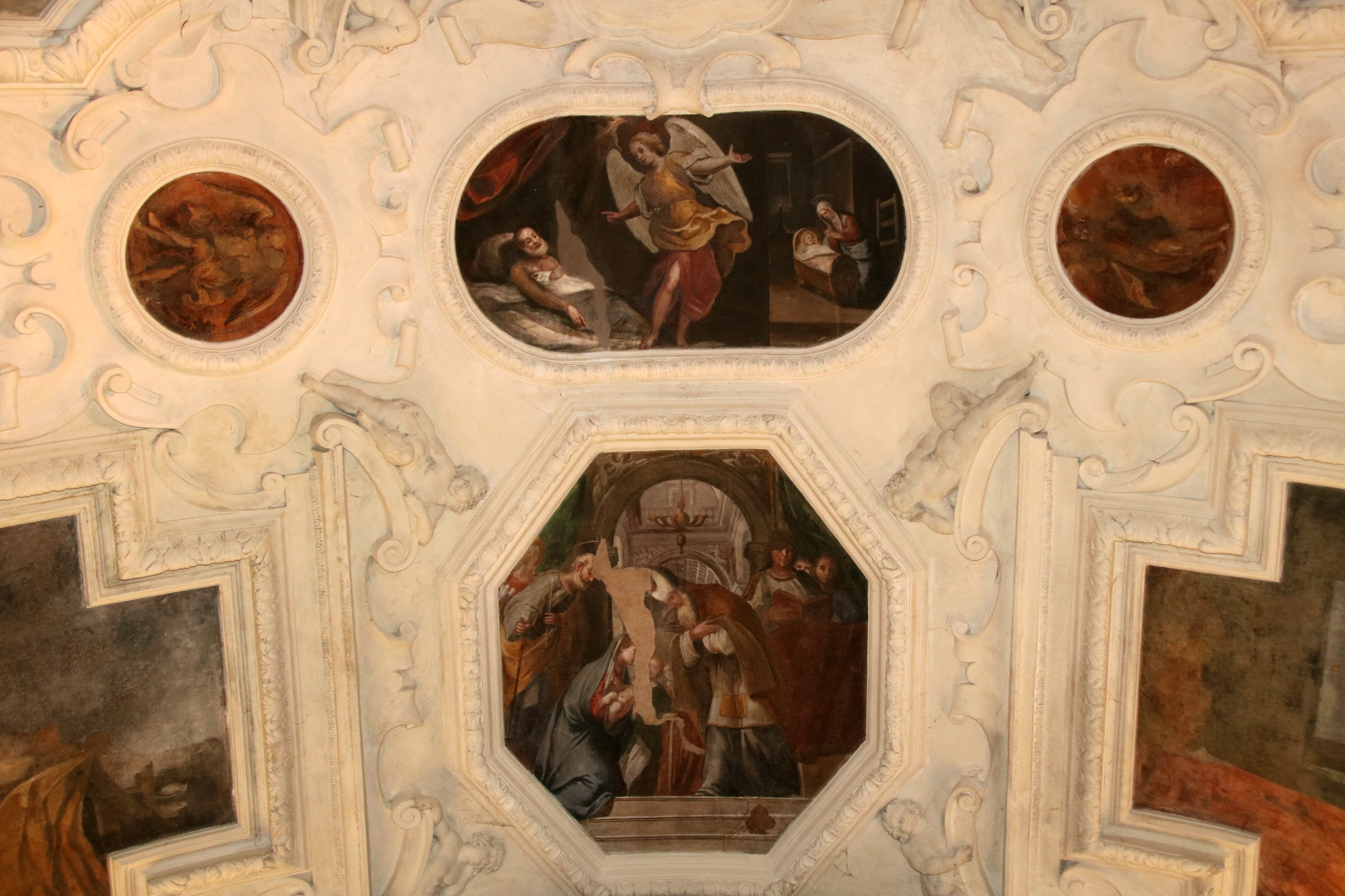
Dream of St. Joseph where the angel suggests him to flee and Presentation at the temple

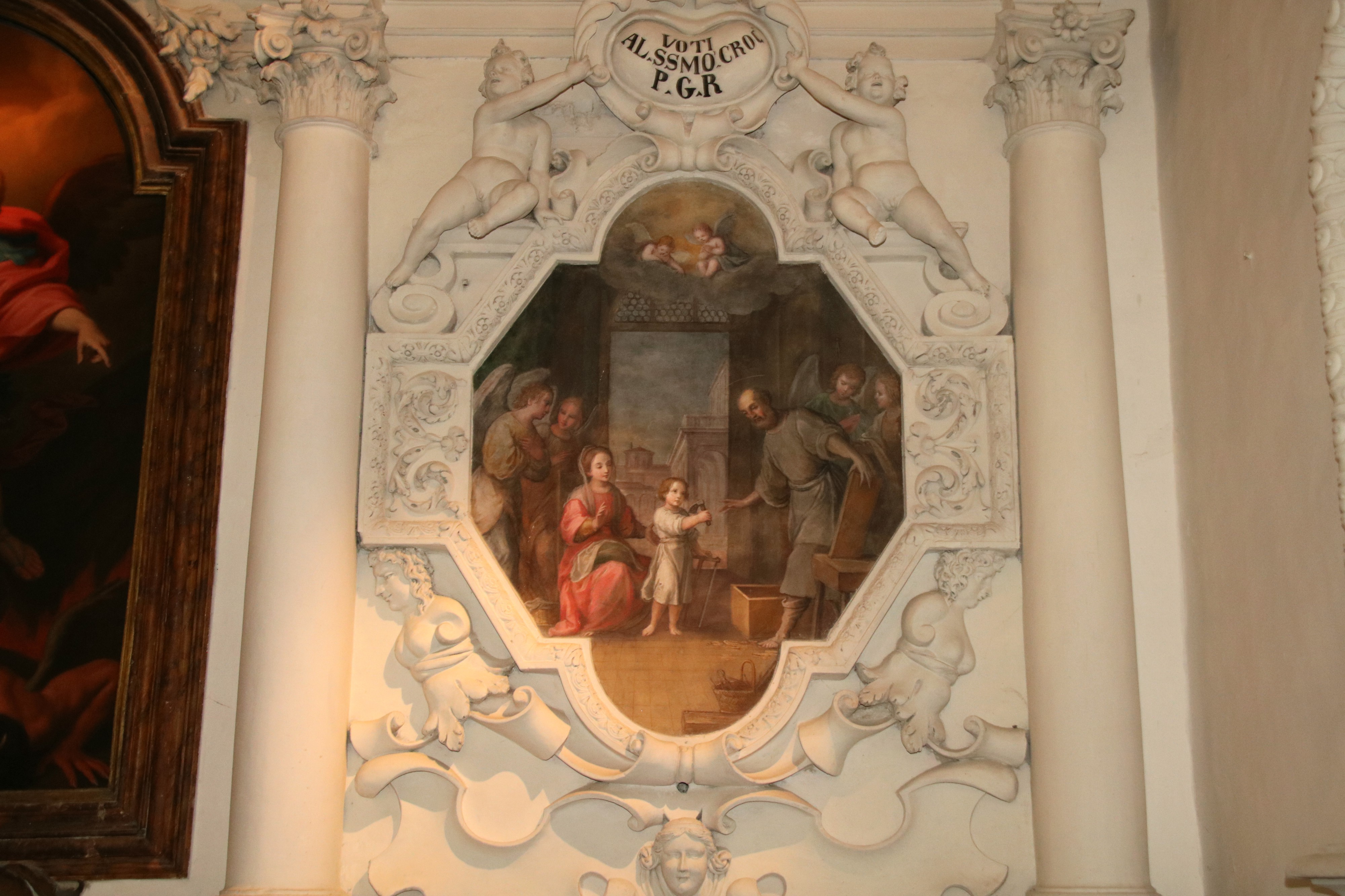
Saint Joseph with the Virgin and Child Jesus

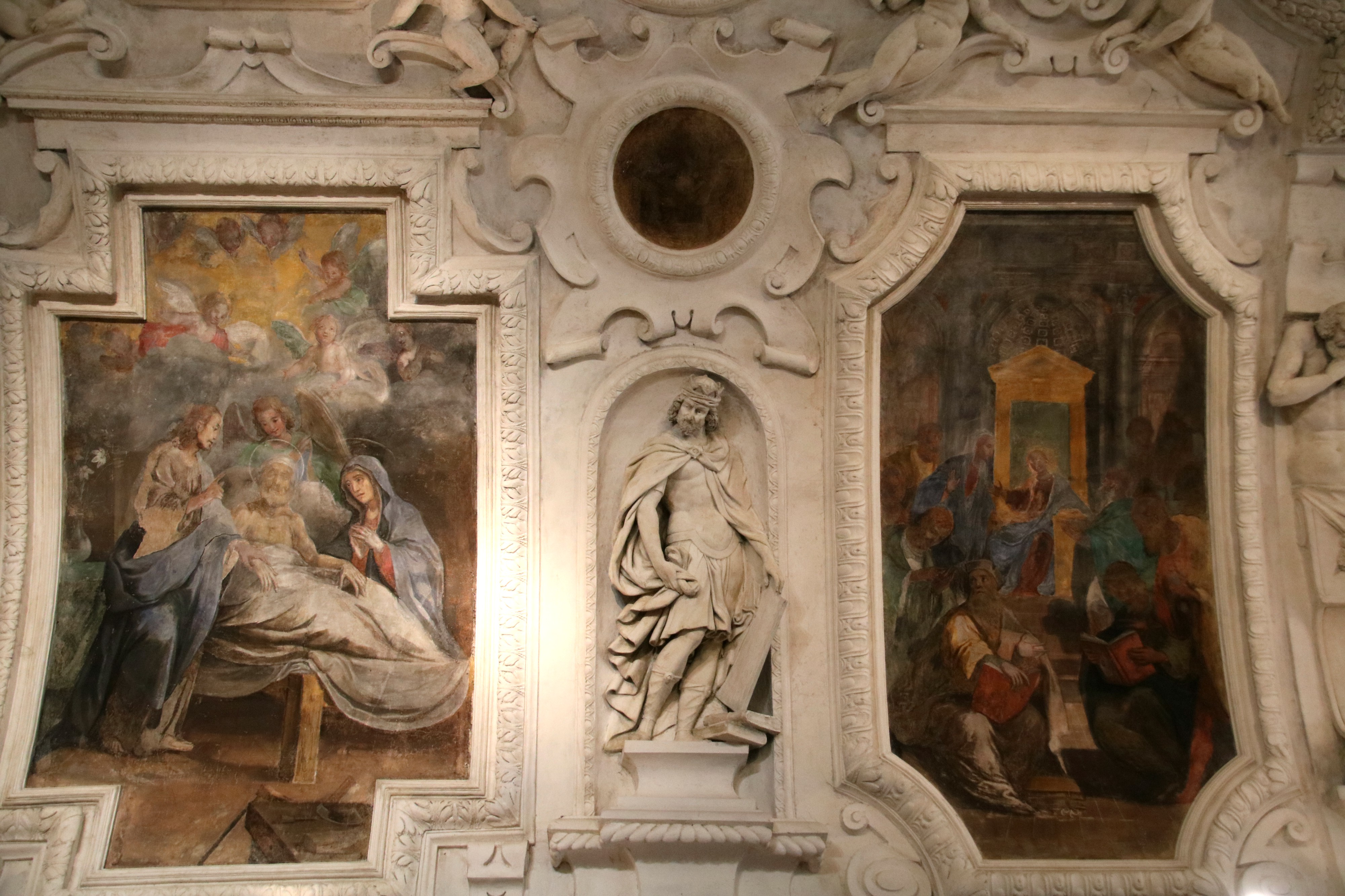
Transit of Joseph and Jesus among the doctors of the temple

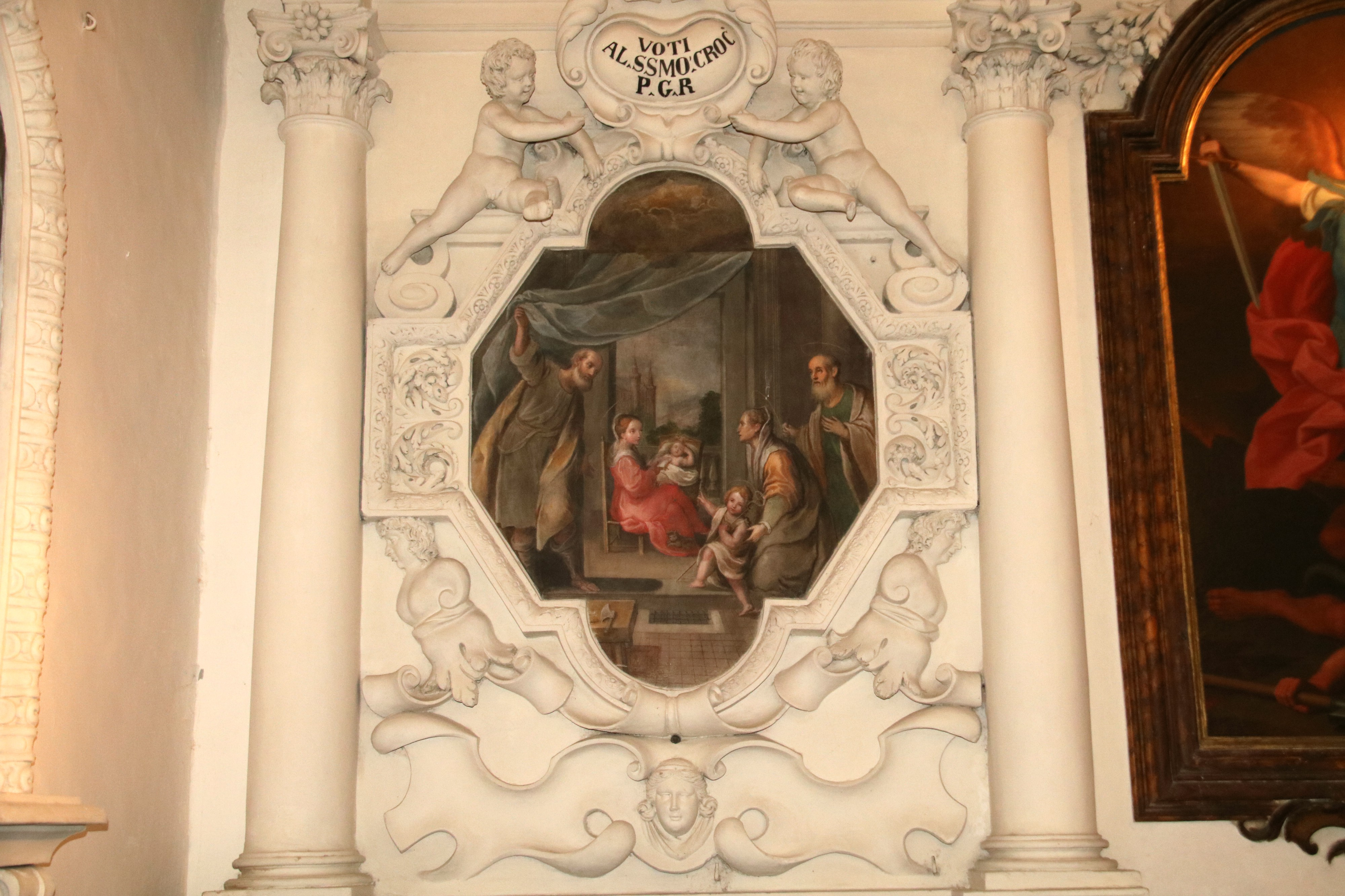
San Giuseppe showing the Virgin and Child to San Giovannino and Sant'Elisabetta

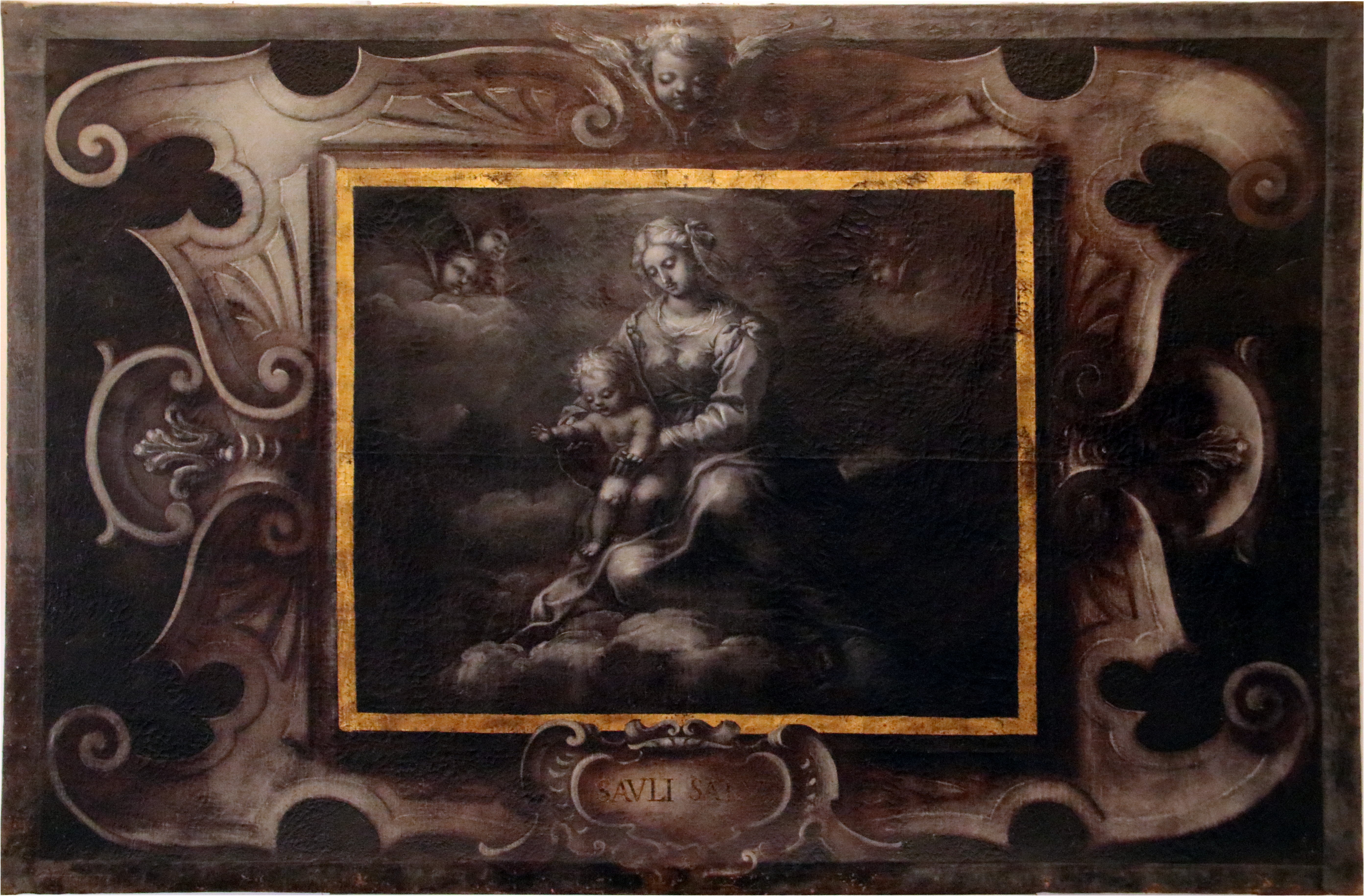
Madonna and Child
