= Santa Caterina, Urbania =

Roman Catholic church in Urbania, Marche, Italy

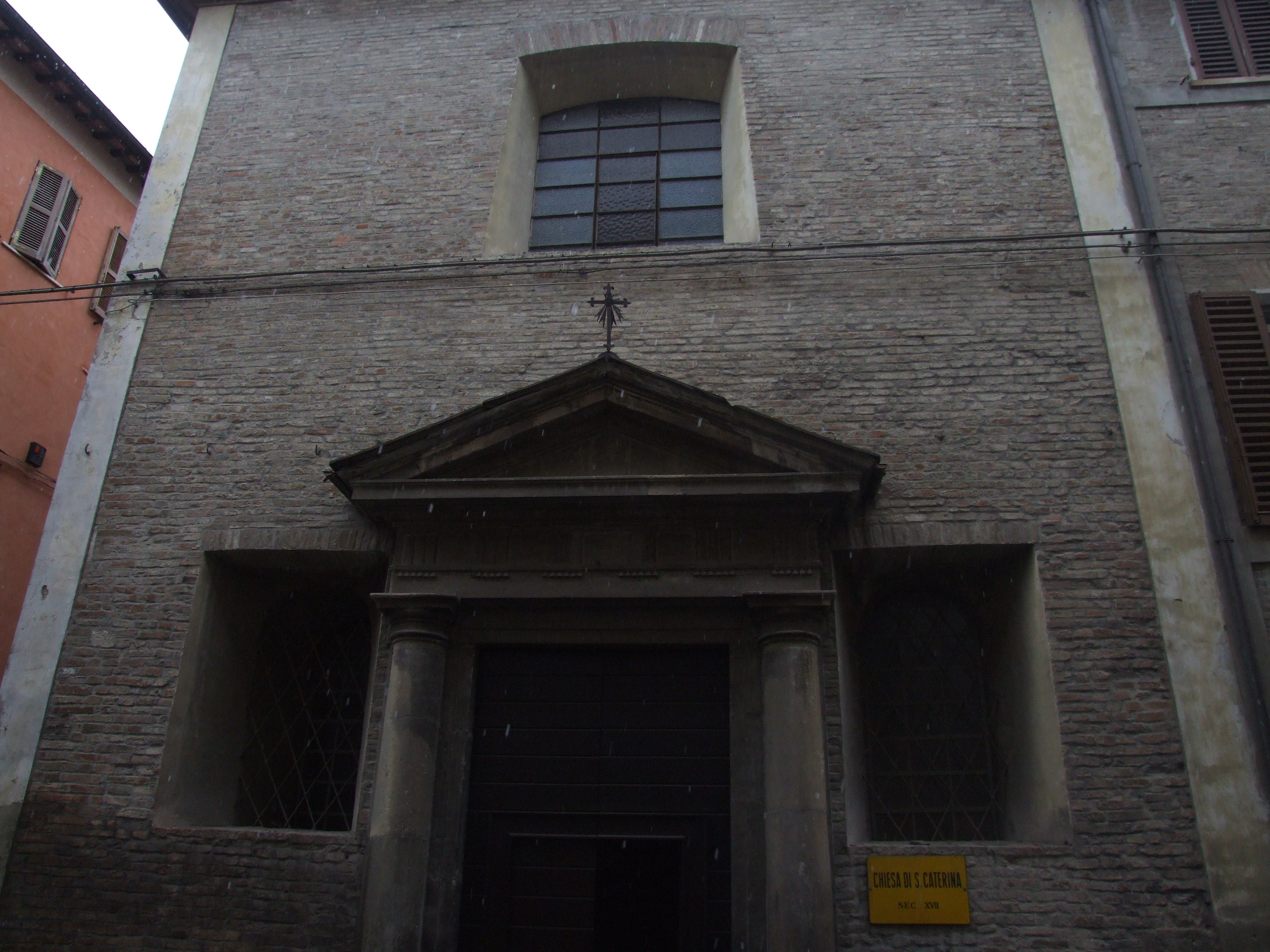
Chiesa di Santa Caterina - Urbania 1.jpg

Santa Caterina is a Roman Catholic, Renaissance-style church in Urbania, region of Marche, Italy.

== History ==
The small church, best described as an oratory, by the 14th century housed the Confraternity of the Artists, and was dedicated to St Catherine of Alexandria, patron of this guild and of artists. The building was reconstructed in 1522 by the architect Taddeo Zandrini.

The interiors have a rich baroque stucco decoration. The ceiling was decorated by the stucco artists and painters and by Ottaviano and Lucio Dolci, and Agostino Apolloni. The ceiling has oval panels depicting Allegories of the Virtues, while to the sides are depicted events in the Life of St Catherine. The four niches in the wall house 17th century statues of the prophets by Tommaso Amantini. One altar has a 17th-century wooden crucifix, flanked by a Madonna and Child with Saints (1615) by Giovanni Giacomo Pandolfi. The main altar has a Entombment of St Catherine (1592) by Donnino Berti based on a design attributed to Taddeo Zuccari.
