= Maurizio Sparagnini =

Italian painter

Maurizio Sparagnini (1706- 1748) was an Italian painter active in a late-Baroque style, active in the Marche, Papal States.

== Biography ==
He was born in Urbania, although described in some sources as a Durantino, and died in Urbino. He painted a St Benedetto da Norcia invia Mauro in Francia, a San Placido, and a Madonna and Child for the church of Santa Maria Maddalena in Urbania.
