= Alessia Morani =

Italian politician (born 1976)

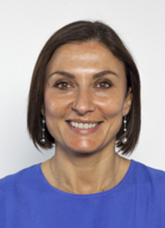

Undersecretary of State at the Ministry of Economic Development
- In office September 16, 2019 – February 13, 2021

Member of Parliament of the Italian Republic
- In office March 15, 2013 – October 12, 2022

Personal details
- Born: January 3, 1976 (age 50) Sassocorvaro, Italy
- Party: PD (since 2007); PDS (1995–1998); DS (1998–2007)
- Education: University of Urbino

Alessia Morani (born 3 January 1976) is an Italian politician.

== Biography ==
Born in Sassocorvaro, in 2001 Morani graduated in law at the University of Urbino. Between 2006 and 2013 she was a member of the board of directors of Pesaro Studi, Fondazione Occhialini and Fano Ateneo. She started her political activity in 1995 as the Pesaro-Urbino provincial secretary of Sinistra giovanile ("Left Youth", the organization that gathered young people up to 29 years in the Democrats of the Left). From 2003 to 2009 Morani served as an advisor and councilor in Macerata Feltria, and from 2009 to 2013 she held the office of councilor for technical education at the Province of Pesaro and Urbino.

She was elected at the Italian parliament in February 2013 with the Democratic Party.
