= Tommaso Amantini =

Italian painter

- Born: 9 March 1625; Urbania, Italy
- Died: 1675 (aged 49–50); Rome, Italy
- Style: Sculpture
- Movement: Baroque

Tommaso Amantini (9 March 1625 – 1675) was an Italian sculptor and painter of the Baroque period. He was born in Urbania in the Marche region of Italy, and died in Rome. He studied with Bartoccini in Urbania, where he worked on maiolica. He then went to Borgo San Sepolcro to work with Federico Gioia. In Rome he was a part of the circle working for Bernini. He created some of the sculptures for the oratory of Saint Catherine in Urbania.
