= Urbania Cathedral =

Main church of Urbania, Italy

Coordinates: 43.6678°N 12.5233°E

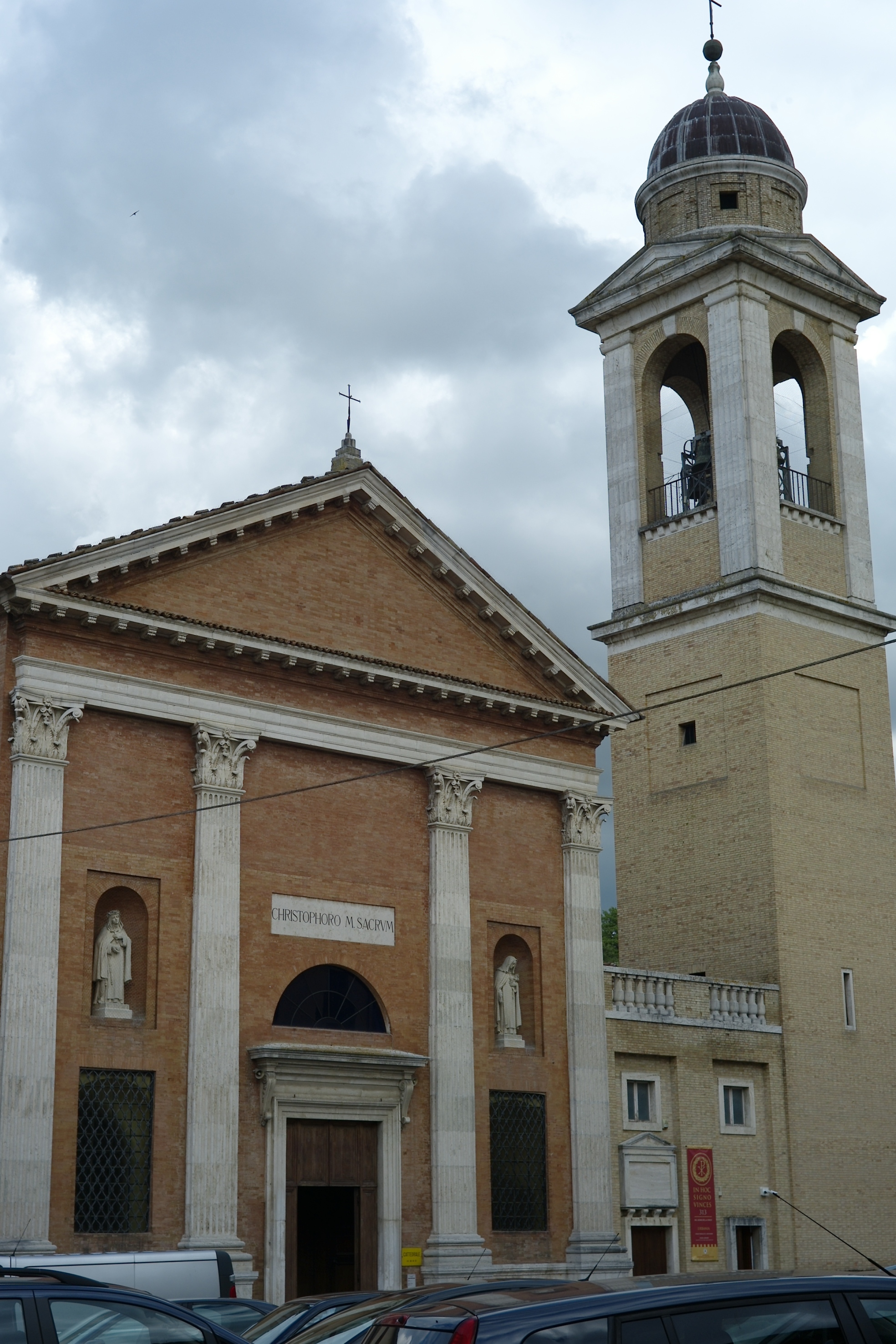
West front of the cathedral

Urbania Cathedral (Italian: Duomo di Urbania; Concattedrale di San Cristoforo martire) is a Neoclassical Roman Catholic cathedral, dedicated to Saint Christopher, in Urbania, in the Province of Pesaro and Urbino in the region of Marche, Italy.

It was the seat of the Bishops of Urbania e Sant'Angelo in Vado from the creation of the diocese in 1636. Since 1986 it has been a co-cathedral in the Archdiocese of Urbino-Urbania-Sant'Angelo in Vado.

== History ==
The present church was built on the site of a prior Paleochristian structure, the 9th-century church of San Cristoforo. Only the Romanesque bell tower and other traces remain. It was restructured by Cardinal Bessarion, abbot of Casteldurante, who in 1472 brought to it the reliquary of the shoulder bone of Saint Christopher in an urn by Pollaiolo. The church was rebuilt in the mid-1700s by the architect Giuseppe Tosi. The façade (1870) is by Giuseppe Tacchi and the new bell tower (1958) by the engineer Stefanucci.

The interior has a crucifix (1320) by Pietro da Rimini. On the left wall of the apse is a 16th-century canvas of the Pentecost by the Mannerist painter Giustino Episcopi. In the church there are also works by Giorgio Picchi (Saint Ubaldo and the Birth of John the Baptist, of the late 16th century) and other Baroque artists. The chapel of San Cristoforo houses the statue of its patron saint (1768).
