= San Francesco, Urbania =

Roman Catholic church in Urbania, Marche, Italy

Coordinates: 43.669198°N 12.524259°E

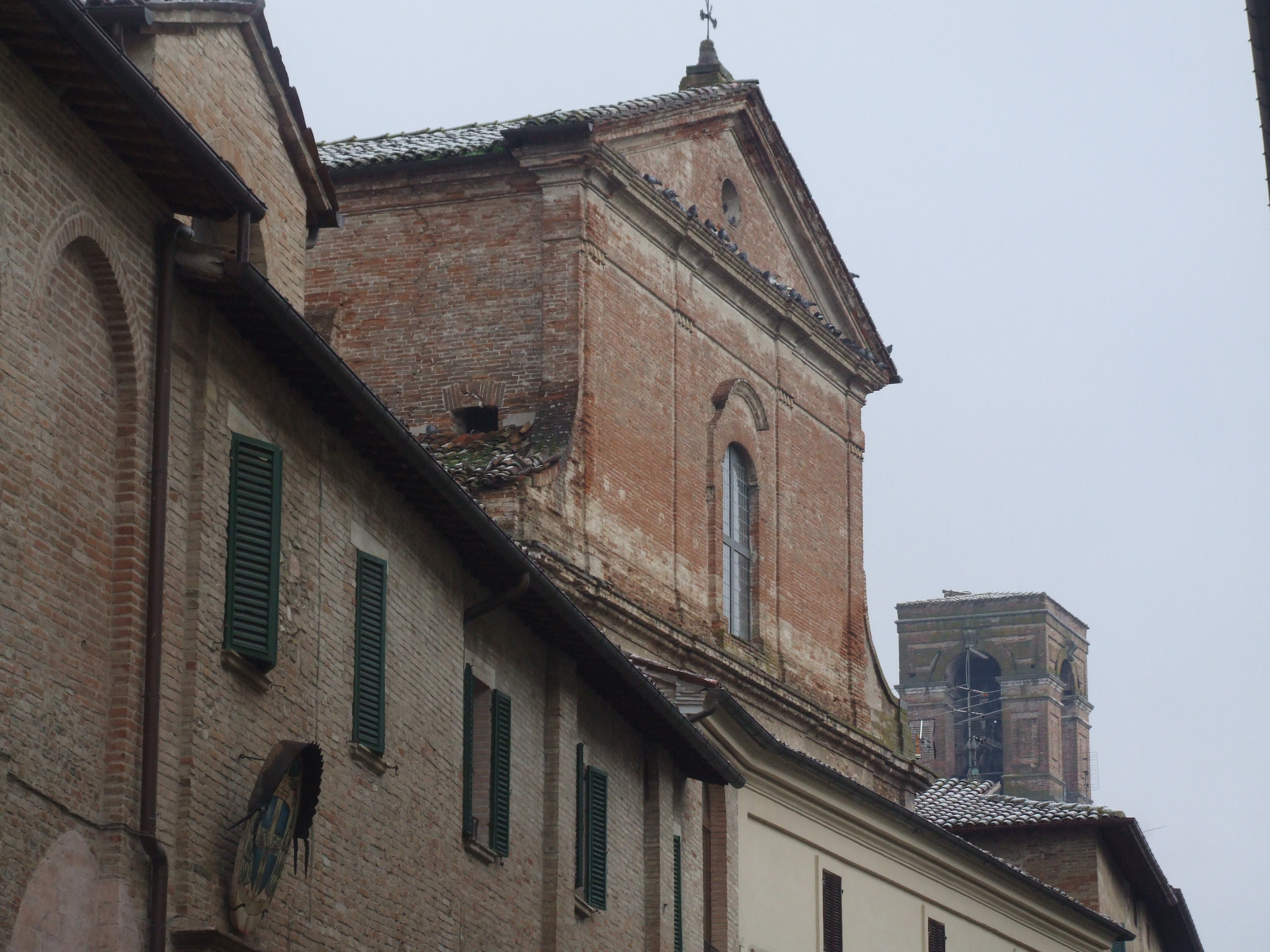
Chiesa di San Francesco - Urbania 5.jpg

San Francesco is a Roman Catholic church in Urbania, region of Marche, Italy. It has a diverse set of styles reflecting refurbishments over the centuries.

== History ==
A Franciscan community was putatively located here by St Francis of Assisi himself. The town of Castel delle Ripe was destroyed during wars in 1277. The initial patron for this church was Guglielmo Durante, a papal legate. The church and an adjacent convent were begun in Romanesque-Gothic style in 1282, and completed by 1290 and consecrated in 1227.

In the 16th century, reconstruction gave the church a Renaissance update, but a further baroque refurbishment, giving the nave undulating walls with echoing cornices, took place in the 18th century. The campanile bell-tower dates to the 15th century. The cloister lunettes have frescoes depicting the Life of St Francis (circa 1570) by Giorgio Picchi. The monastery was transformed into a seminary, active from the 19th century until the 1970s.

The portico on the left in gothic style, attributed to a young Lorenzo Ghiberti, was walled at the end of the 19th century.

Among the works inside the church are:

- Assumption of the Virgin, in first altar on right by Domenico Peruzzini
- Madonna in Glory with Saints, in apse by Giorgio Picchi
- Nativity (1586) in first altar on left also by Picchi
- Crucifixion in second altar on left by Agostino Apolloni
- Adoration by Magi (1558) in left transept by Giustino Episcopio
- Church organ (1762) by Arcangelo Feligiotti
