= Gentile Brancaleoni =

Gentile Brancaleoni (1416 – Urbino, 27 July 1457), was an Italian noble, Duchess of Urbino in 1444-1457 by marriage to Federico da Montefeltro. Sha was the daughter of Bartolomeo Brancaleoni, Lord of Massa Trabaria and Count of Mercatello sul Metauro, and Giovanna Alidosi, daughter of Bertrando Alidosi, condottiere and Lord of Imola. The name "Gentile" is, now as then, both masculine and feminine; in fact, she was named after her paternal grandfather.

== Life ==
Following the death of Bartolomeo Brancaleoni in 1424, his daughters, Gentile and her older sister Piera, became in the co-heiresses of his domains and assets under the tutelage of their mother Giovanna Alidosi; however, the effective government was taken by Guidantonio da Montefeltro, Count of Urbino, formally appointed vicar in temporalibus by Pope Martin V. Giovanna Alidosi (also in the name of her daughters) acted as de facto Lady Sovereign, probably in view of the future institutional structure of those domains. With only four-years-old, Guidantonio's illegitimated but legitimized son Federico da Montefeltro was sent to the small court of Mercatello sul Metauro around 1426, and in 1433 the Count of Urbino obtained from the pontiff the consent of the betrothal between his son and Gentile, who already became in the sole heiress of the Lordships of Mercatello sul Metauro, Massa Trabaria and Sant'Angelo in Vado following the death of her elder sister Piera before 1431.

The marriage between Gentile Brancaleoni and Federico da Montefeltro was officially solemnized in 1437 after which the spouse entered in possession of the domains of his wife jure uxoris; six years later, in 1443, Pope Eugene IV granted Federico da Montefeltro the vicariate in temporalibus and immediately after the title of Count for the domains that previously belonged to Bartolomeo Brancaleoni.

When in 1444 Federico da Montefeltro will rise to power in his paternal ancestral domains (Urbino, Cagli, Cantiano, Gubbio, Castel Durante and part of Montefeltro) as Duke, his wife's domains Massa Trabaria, Sant'Angelo in Vado and Mercatello sul Metauro (alongside with other eighteen castles originally belonging to the Brancaleoni family) were definitively merged to that articulated state which later will be called Duchy of Urbino. And it is only from that date, but permanently from 1447, that Gentile will move to Urbino as Duchess consort.

In Urbino, Gentile treated as her own the natural but legitimized children of her husband: Elisabetta, Gentile, Buonconte and Antonio. The rumours according to which, given her sterility, she was imprisoned in a convent by her husband to conclude a new marriage were unfounded; in fact, Federico loved and respected his wife, remarrying only after she died. In later life, Gentile was a Franciscan tertiary like many members of the House of Montefeltro.

Gentile died on 27 July 1457, probably due to complications linked to the serious obesity from which she had been suffering for some time.

== Bibliography ==
- Vincenzo Lanciarini, Il Tiferno Mataurense e la Provincia di Massa Trabaria, Grafica Vadese, Sant'Angelo in Vado, 1988 (Rome 1890–1929), vol. I, pp. 383–400 and vol. II, pp. 492–507.
- Gino Franceschini, La morte di Gentile Brancaleoni (1457) e di Buonconte da Montefeltro (1458), in "Archivio Storico Lombardo" vol. 63, 1937, pp. 489–500. link in: regesta-imperii.de
- Erica Perini, La signoria dei Brancaleoni di Casteldurante, MEF Firenze Atheneum, Florence, 2008, pp. 72–74. ISBN 978-8872553251
