= Sassocorvaro =

Sassocorvaro is a frazione of the comune (municipality) of Sassocorvaro Auditore in the Province of Pesaro e Urbino in the Italian region Marche, located 80 kilometres (50 mi) west of Ancona and about 35 kilometres (22 mi) southwest of Pesaro. It was a separate comune until 31 December 2018.

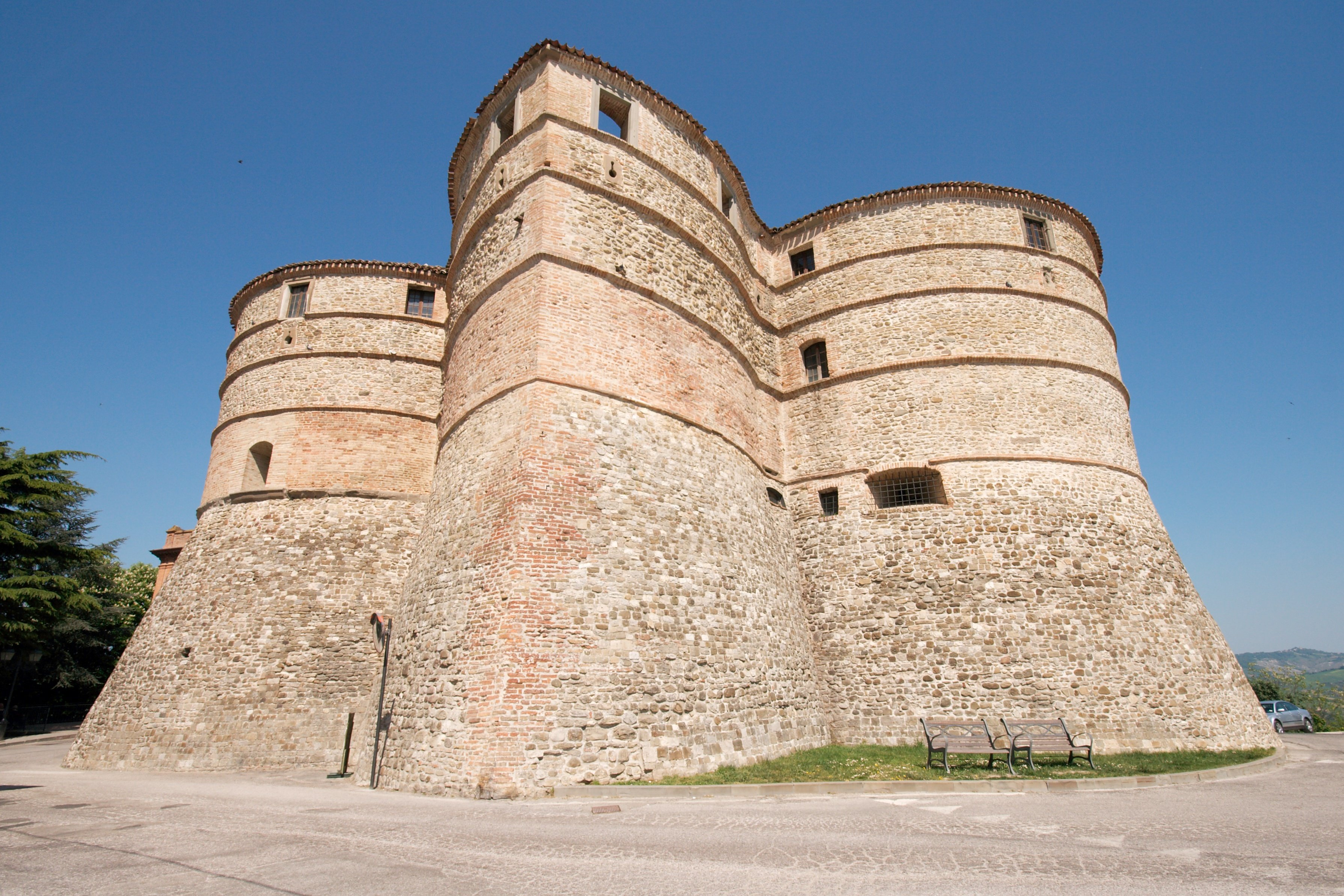
Rocca of Sassocorvaro, where artworks were hidden during World War II.

== Main sights ==
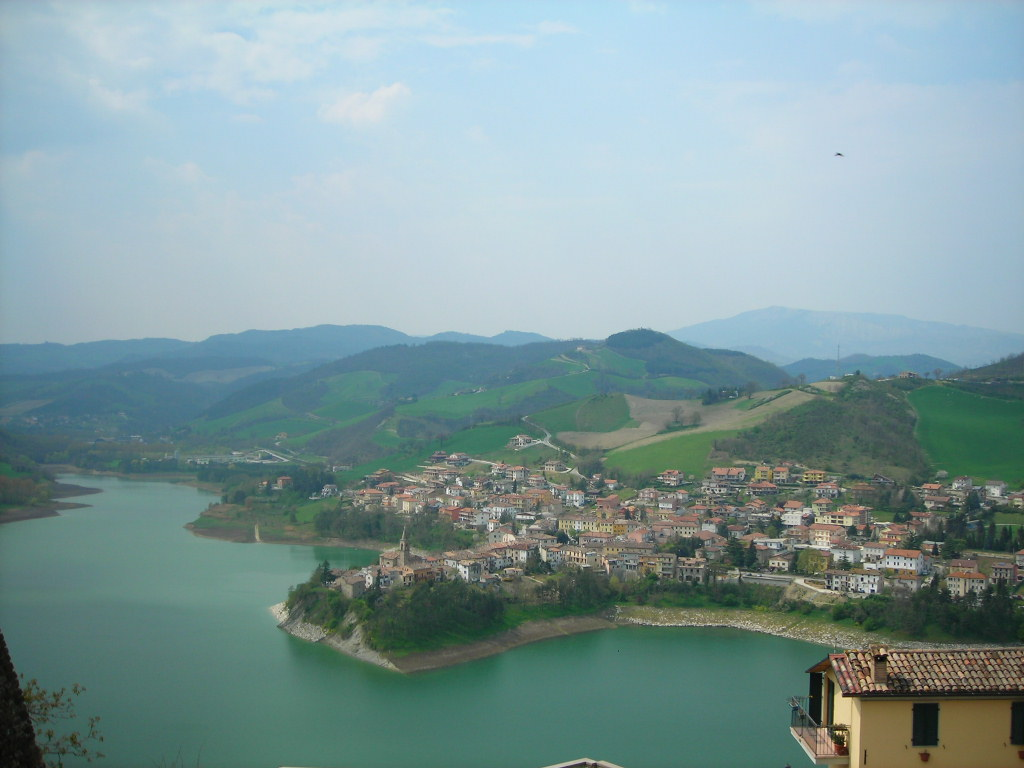
Lake of Mercatale.

- Rocca Ubaldinesca, a Renaissance fortification designed by Francesco di Giorgio Martini. During World War II, it was used to house works of art from all Italy in order to prevent they were stolen by the German occupation force.
- Downstream of the town, in the Mercatale valley, is an artificial lake originated by the construction of a dam that blocks the flow of the river Foglia. The dam was built in the 1950s. The basin contains about 6 million cubic meters of water, and is used as an irrigation source. The water of the lake is conveyed by gravity in a turbine for the generation of electricity.
