= Santissimo Crocifisso, Urbania =

Roman Catholic church in Urbania, Marche, Italy

The church of the Santissimo Crocifisso or Chiesa dell'Ospedale is a Roman Catholic, Baroque-style church in Urbania, region of Marche, Italy.

== History ==
The church, once called the Oratory della Neve, is documented by the 15th century. It was refurbished in the 17th century by monks of the Caracciolini (of the order of San Francesco Caracciolo). The adjacent convent has now become the main hospital in the town.

The church still houses its artwork: a Crucifixion and a Madonna and Child, both (1604) attributed to Federico Barocci. The church once entombed the last Duke of Urbino, Francesco Maria II della Rovere, who died in 1631. The relics were however lost from the site.
