= Luzio Dolci =

Italian painter

Luzio Dolci or Lucio Dolce was a late 16th-century Italian painter active in Castel Durante in the Province of Pesaro and Urbino in the Region of the Marche.

== History ==
Luzio was born to a family of artists: his grandfather Bernardino and father Ottaviano were stucco artists. Luzio flourished in 1589, is commended for his altar-pieces and other pictures in the churches there. He collaborated with Giustino Episcopio in painting for the church of Santo Spirito in Urbania.

It is said that he was employed by the Duke of Urbino to paint at the Imperiale. He executed many works at Rome, as well as at Castel Durante, and resided in the former city for some time. There are few particulars recorded of him, though he is often mentioned with high commendation.

His son and grandson were Ottavio (painter and stucco artist) and Bernardo Dolce (painter). His nephew through his sister, Agostino Apolonio, from Sant' Angelo in Vado, was a prominent local painter.
