= Brancaleoni =

Brancaleoni is a surname. Notable people with the surname include:

- Gentile Brancaleoni
- Giuseppe Soleri Brancaleoni (1750–1806), Italian painter
- Matteo Brancaleoni (born 1981), Italian contemporary pop/jazz singer, actor, and journalist
- Vincenzo Brancaleoni (died 1588), Italian Roman Catholic bishop
