= Santa Maria Maddalena, Urbania =

Catholic Monastery in Marche region, Italy

Coordinates: 43°40′02″N 12°31′35″E

Santa Maria Maddalena is a Roman Catholic, Renaissance-style church and convent in Urbania, region of Marche, Italy.

== History ==
A Benedictine order monastery was present at the site since the 9th century, but the site was mainly in ruins by the early 16th century, due to the wars contesting the surrounding territory. The church and reconstructed in 1575. Abandoned again, it was reconsecrated in 1743. The nuns endured an expulsion during the Napoleonic period. Refurbished in 1968, the convent now houses Benedictine nuns.

The nave of the small church is divided into two spaces by a transverse set of three arches: the apse and choir was reserved for the cloistered monks. The church still contains three altarpieces towards the apse:

- Penitent Magadalen (1637), main altar by Guido Cagnacci
- Saints Benedict, Scolastica with Saints Mauro and Placido by Maurizio Sparagnini
- Santa Bambina by Giuseppe Luzi

The convent houses a venerated doll-like icon of a child (Bambina) representing the Virgin Mary as a child.
