= Giovanni Peruzzini (painter) =

Italian painter

Giovanni Peruzzini (1629–1694) was an Italian painter of the Baroque.

His father, Domenico Peruzzini was also a painter. Giovanni was born in Ancona, and became a pupil of Simone Cantarini. In Ancona, he painted a Beheading of St. John for the Spedale and a Santa Teresa for the Carmelitani. He lived for some time in Bologna, where he painted a Descent of the Holy Ghost for the church of SS. Vitale ed Agricola and a Santa Cecilia for the church of that name. He also painted for the lunettes of the Portico of the Basilica di Santa Maria dei Servi. He was invited to Turin, to the court of the Savoy, who awarded him a knighthood in the Order of Saints Maurice and Lazarus. He painted some frescoes in the chapel of the Ghislieri College in Pavia. He died in Milan. His sons, Paolo and Domenico Peruzzini the Younger, were also painters.
