= Federico Brandani =

Italian sculptor

Federico Brandani (1522/1525 – 1575) was an Italian sculptor and stuccoist who worked in an urbane Mannerist style as a court artist of Guidobaldo II della Rovere, Duke of Urbino.

== Early life ==
Born in Urbino, Brandani was apprenticed there to Giovanni Maria di Casteldurante, a maiolica artist, between 1538 and 1541. There are stucco wall and ceiling decorations by Brandani in the Palazzo Ducale, Urbino. His masterpiece is considered to be his presepio, a nativity scene with life-size stucco figures, which is in the Oratory of the Church of San Giuseppe, Urbino.

== Career ==
For Guidobaldo's wedding with Vittoria Farnese in 1548 Brandani was one of the team that embellished the Palazzo Ducale in Pesaro, where he collaborated with Taddeo Zuccari and Ludovico Carracci. In 1551–53 he worked for Pope Julius III at Villa Giulia, Rome, "if, as seems probable, Brandani is the 'Federigo d'Urbino stuccatore' to whom payments are recorded for work 'alle fontane' of the Villa Giulia between September 1552 and June 1553."

From the mid-1550s, Brandani worked on stucco ceilings and other decorations in the Palazzo Tirrani-Castracane in Cagli for Felice Tiranni. He completed that work in about 1571, when he executed Vulcan's Forge over the fireplace in the Salone. He contributed five high-relief panels to a vaulted ceiling in Palazzo Corboli, Urbino, adapting designs by Taddeo Zuccari, who was working at Villa Giulia when Brandani was there. He also worked on Palazzetto Baviera in Senigallia (1560); and Palazzo Rocca in Fabriano. Towards the end of his life he executed stucco decorations in the Castello Brancaleoni, Piobbico, for Antonio II di Monaldo (d.1598) and in the Urbino chapel at the Basilica of the Holy House, Loreto, commissioned by Guidobaldo in 1571–72. Another late work is the bas-relief of the Martyrdom of Saint Catherine in the Church of Santa Catarina, Urbino.

A bronze bust of the courtier poet and diplomat Antonio Galli (1510–61) at the Frick Collection, New York, formerly attributed to Leone Leoni, was reattributed to Brandani by John Pope-Hennessy. Galli also served Guidobaldo della Rovere, as tutor to his son and as his ambassador at Rome and Venice. The bust, identified as Galli by a later inscription on the base, is the only bronze casting attributed to this sculptor, and the only portrait.

Brandani was virtually forgotten until he was brought into focus as the premier sixteenth-century sculptor in Marche by Luigi Serra in the 1920s.
