= Santo Spirito, Urbania =

Church building in Urbania, Italy

Spirito Santo is a modern Roman Catholic church building in Urbania, in the Province of Pesaro and Urbino in Marche region, Italy.

== History ==
Opposite the cathedral, the temple was erected to remember the victims of the disastrous air bombardment suffered by Urbania on 23 January 1944. It was built at the site of an earlier church. Inside Augusto Ranocchi created a large mosaic memorial in the apse (1969) and in the bronze door (2007). The façade is by the architect Del Mastro.
