= Domenico Peruzzini =

Italian painter

Domenico Peruzzini (October 18, 1602– active until 1672) was an Italian painter of the Baroque, active mainly in the region of Marche.

== Biography ==
Domenico was born in Urbania to a Pesarese family of Maiolica painters. Domenico trained with Giovanni Giacomo Pandolfi. His son, Giovanni Peruzzini was born in Ancona and became a pupil of Simone Cantarini.
