= Giorgio Picchi =

Italian painter

Giorgio Picchi il Giovane (active 1586-1599) was an Italian painter active in Rome, Cremona, Rimini, Urbino, and Urbania. He was either a pupil or follower of Federico Barocci.

Born in Castel Durante, present-day Urbania, he trained with his father (Giogio Picchi il Vecchio), a profitable maiolica painter and producer. Along with Sebastiano Sabatini, called il Mafori, Picchi il Vecchio was active in Castel Durante and left his active factory of maiolica to his son.

His son, however, soon pursued painting on canvas and fresco. He was one of the team of painters employed to paint the Scala Santa, the palace of San Giovanni Laterano, and the Vatican Library in Rome. He painted for the chapel of the Santissimo Sacramento in Cremona. In Rimini, he painted for the church of San Martino and Sant'Agostino. He painted in the no longer extant cloister of the Franciscans in Urbania; a number of his canvases (1586) for the adjacent church of San Francesco still are in place. He died around the age of 50.
