= Andrea Picchi =

Andrea Picchi (1823 in Florence – ?), was a well-known ebonist who framed works of art for aristocratic clients ("Prestigious orders from imperial and aristocratic customers rolled in for ANDREA PICCHI and Paolo Fanfani, designers in some respects imprisoned by a past both sought after and beloved but also perhaps hortus conclusus and extremely difficult to escape").

== Works ==
=== For Olga Nikolaevna Romanova ===
For Grand Duchess Olga Nikolaevna Romanova, he framed a pair of tondi after paintings by Fra Angelico (15th century), executed by Diomede della Bruna, a Florentine painter born in 1839 ("Elaborate, octagonal Baroque style frame with flame-carved border, ebony with part-gilt bronze fittings and 16 set carnelians each. On the verso the Florentine frame maker's label "Ebanista Andrea Picchi". 46 cm diameter each").

=== For Umberto I and Queen Margherita of Savoy ===
He also framed for Umberto I and his wife Queen Margherita of Savoy, two works by Tito Chelazzi - an oil painting of daisies (after the queen's name, Margherita, which means "daisy") and a mirror (roses thea painted on glass) the royal couple had commissioned from this painter, he too a sought after artist by European royal families.

=== For the 1867 Paris Exhibition ===
After some years in Via della Vigna Nuova, Picchi moved to Via Maggio, 28, where he developed his artistry in carving ebony, a dense yet fine textured black wood. But his masterpiece in carving would be the exceptionally beautiful ebony and ivory cabinet in the style of the Italian Renaissance Picchi presented in the 1867 Paris Exhibition, though with "a marked similarity in this design to that of a 17th century cabinet(...)" as Frederick Litchfiel points out in his History of Furniture. In fact, when comparing the pictures of the two cabinets in Litchfiel's book, one may doubt if it is a mere coincidence or not. Nevertheless Picchi's cabinet remains a jewel of carving and an example of mastering ivory and ebony. Now in oblivion, only his oval stamp on the verso of some ebony framed works of the 19th century calls out "Andrea Picchi, ebanista, Via Maggio, No. 28, Firenze".
