= Rocca Ubaldinesca =

Coordinates: 43.7809°N 12.4956°E

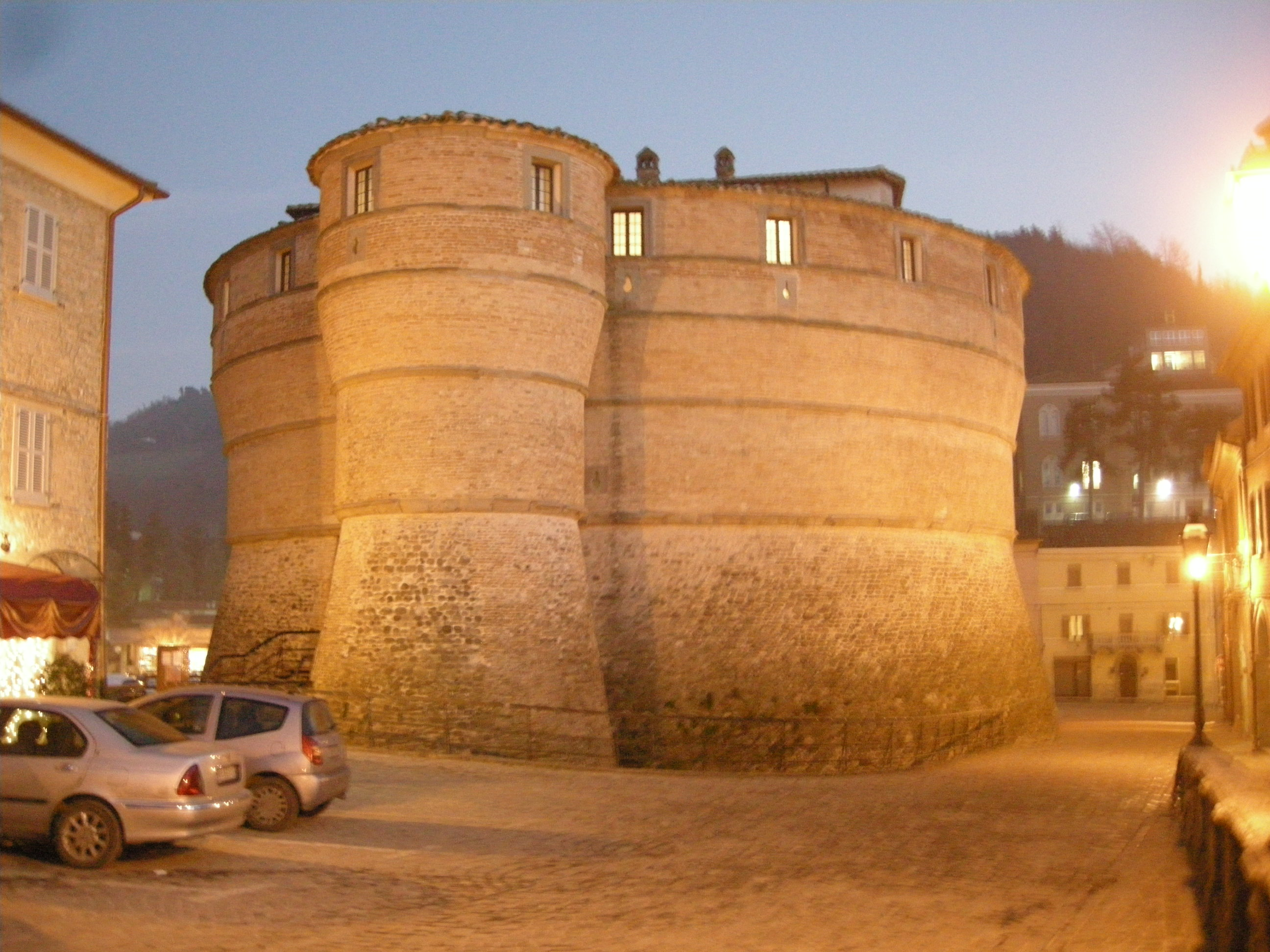
Northwest view of castle

The Rocca Ubaldinesca or Castle of the Ubaldini is a relatively small Renaissance-style castle located in the town of Sassocorvaro Auditore, province of Pesaro, region of Marche, Italy. The castle, located on a hill overlooking the river Foglia, is peculiar for it turtle-like layout.

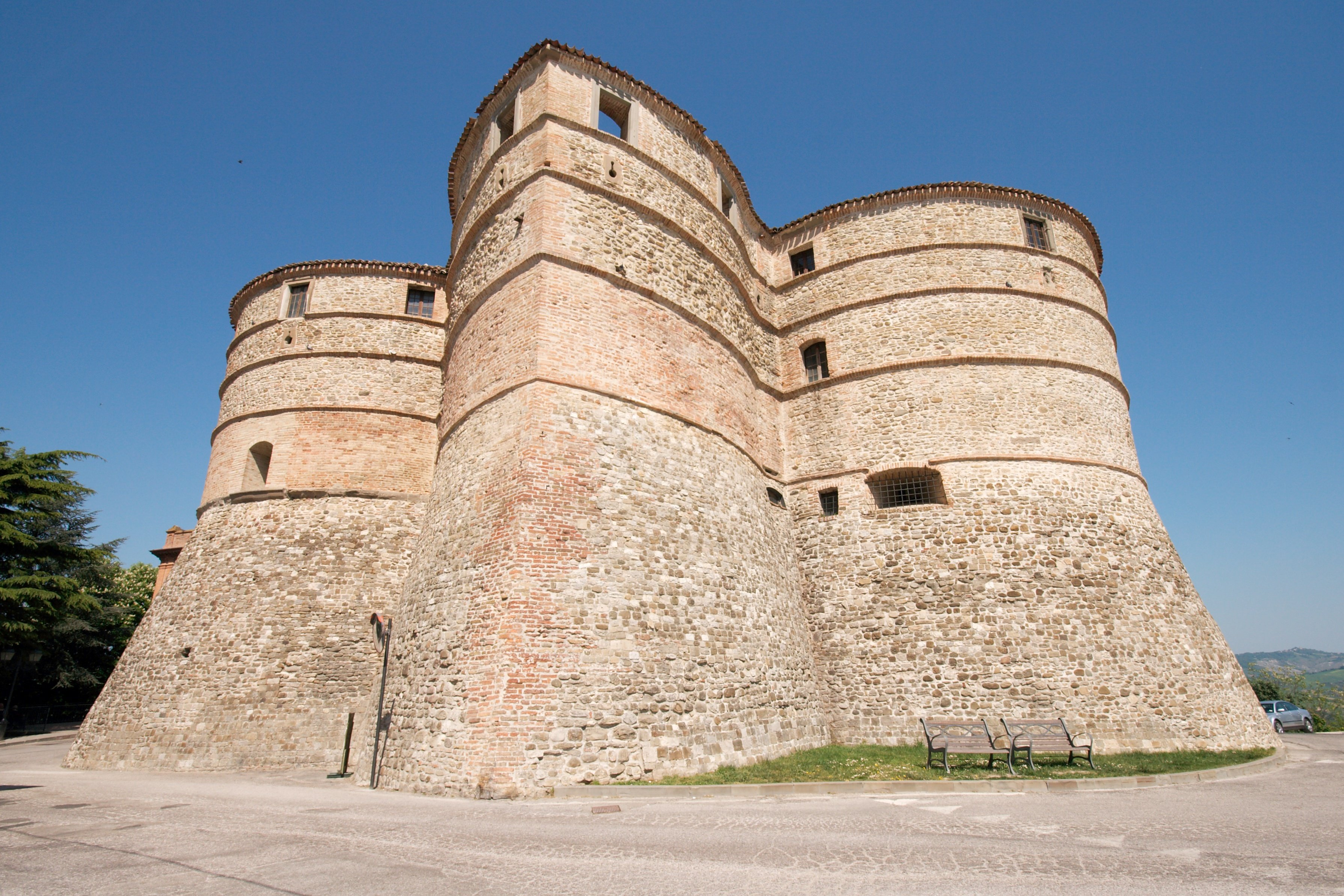
Southeast point of castle

== History ==
The present structure was commissioned by Federico da Montefeltro, Duke of Urbino to his architect Francesco di Giorgio Martini: the castle was built as a compact brick and stone building with tall sloping walls. The fort passed on to Ottaviano degli Ubaldini della Carda, brother of Duke Federico. The heraldic symbols in the castle belong to Ottaviano. The castle then passed to the Doria family of Genoa, who after 1511, became counts of Sassocorvaro.

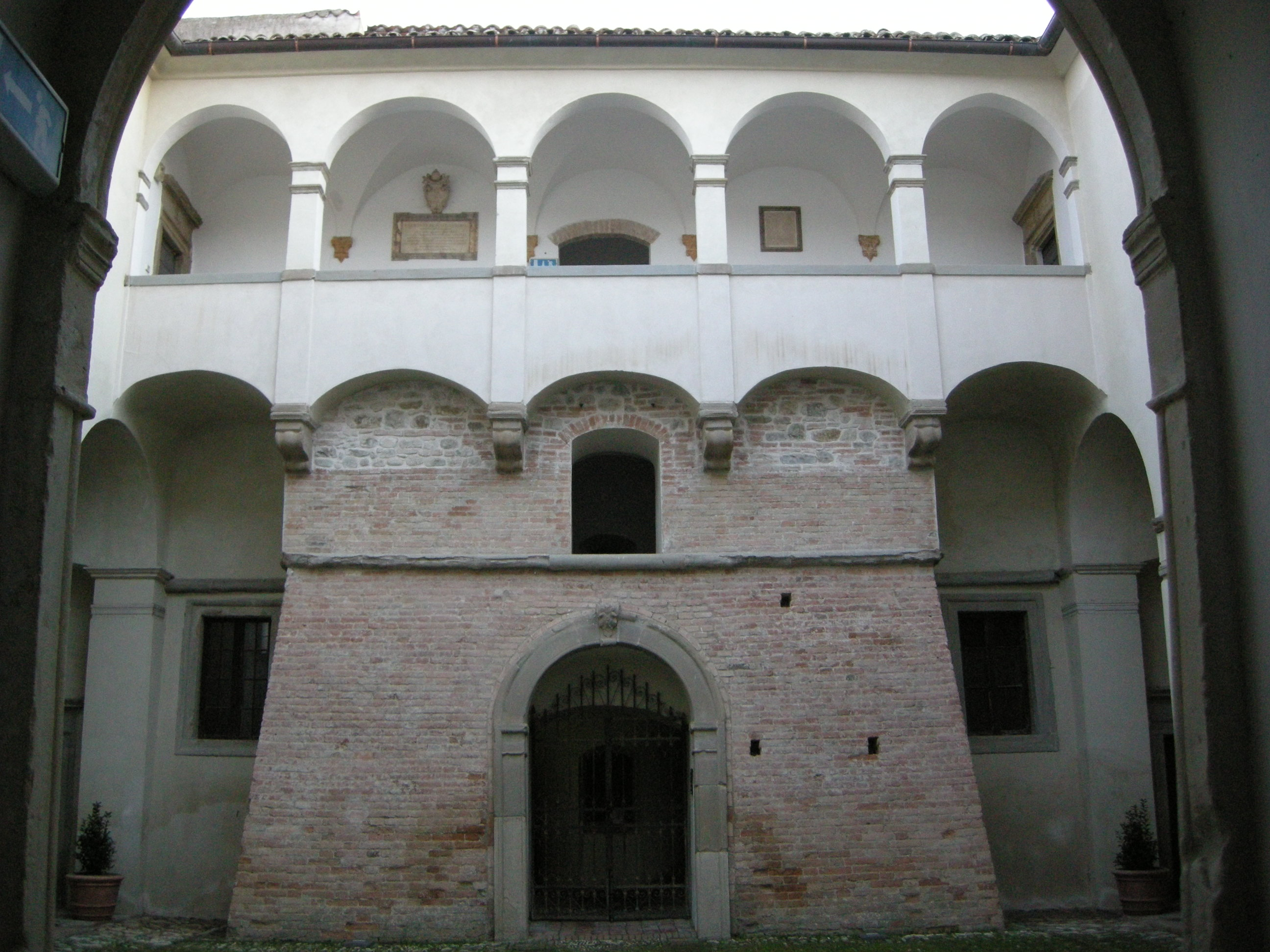
Interior courtyard.

The Counts of Sassocorvaro died out in 1626, and the territory entered the Papal States. In 1706 the property was granted to Giovanni Cristoforo Battelli, Archbishop of Amasia, librarian and counselor to Pope Clement XI Albani.

Monsignor Battelli restored the castle, rebuilding a chapel and created a library. To the latter have been added papers and volumes from the Archbishopric. In the late 19th-century, the interiors were refurbished, creating a large hall, theater, and the interiors were decorated in 1895 by Enrico Mancini in a neoclassical style.

During the Second World War, the castle was used by Pasquale Rotondi to hide many works being targeted for looting by the Nazi army.

The castle now serves as the museum and includes an early 16th-century altarpiece depicting the Madonna and Child with Saints Sebastian, Roch and Nicolò by Evangelista da Pian di Meleto as well as Baroque paintings. It contains designs and works by Enrico Mancini (1867–1913), who also decorated the 19th-century Teatrino built into what was once the main hall of the fort.

== Exhibitions ==
In 2017 the Rocca Ubaldinesca hosted the national sculpture exhibition Arcana – The Seal of Light by the Marche artist Andrea da Montefeltro.
