= Urbino =

Urbino Urbìn (Romagnol)
- Comune
- Comune di Urbino
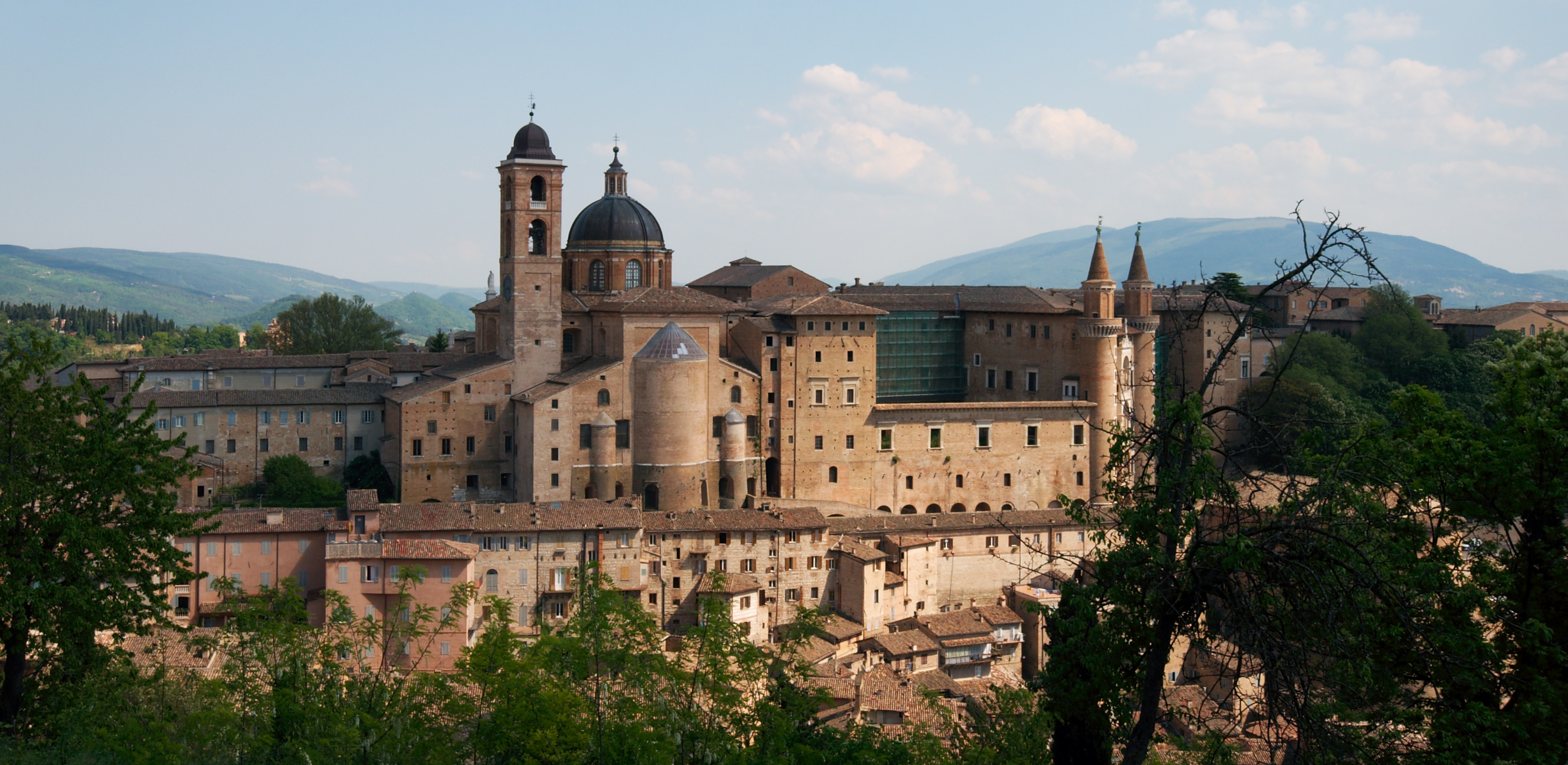
- View of Urbino

- Coat of arms

- Location within Italy Location within Marche
- Coordinates: 43°43′35″N 12°38′11″E
- Country: Italy
- Region: Marche
- Province: Pesaro and Urbino (PU)
- Frazioni: Ca' Mazzasette, Canavaccio, Castelcavallino, La Torre, Mazzaferro, Pieve di Cagna, San Marino, Schieti, Scotaneto, Trasanni

Government
  - Mayor: Maurizio Gambini

Area
  - Total: 226.50 km^{2} (87.45 sq mi)
- Elevation: 451 m (1,480 ft)

Population (30 April 2017)
  - Total: 14,786
  - Density: 65.280/km^{2} (169.08/sq mi)
- Demonym: Urbinate(i)
- Time zone: UTC+1 (CET)
  - Summer (DST): UTC+2 (CEST)
- Postal code: 61029
- Dialing code: 0722
- Patron saint: St. Crescentinus
- Saint day: 1 June
- Website: Official website

UNESCO World Heritage Site
- Official name: Historic Centre of Urbino
- Criteria: Cultural: ii, iv
- Reference: 828
- Inscription: 1998 (22nd Session)
- Area: 23.23 ha (57.4 acres)
- Buffer zone: 3,608.5 ha (8,917 acres)

Urbino (UK: /ɜːrˈbiːnoʊ/ ur-BEE-noh, Italian: [urˈbiːno]; Romagnol: Urbìn) is a comune in the Italian region of Marche, southwest of Pesaro. The historic centre is listed as a UNESCO World Heritage Site for its historical legacy of independent Renaissance culture, especially under the patronage of Federico da Montefeltro, duke of Urbino from 1444 to 1482.

The town, nestled on a high sloping hillside, retains much of its picturesque medieval aspect. It hosts the University of Urbino, founded in 1506, and is the seat of the Archbishop of Urbino. Its best-known architectural piece is the Palazzo Ducale, rebuilt by Luciano Laurana.

== Geography ==
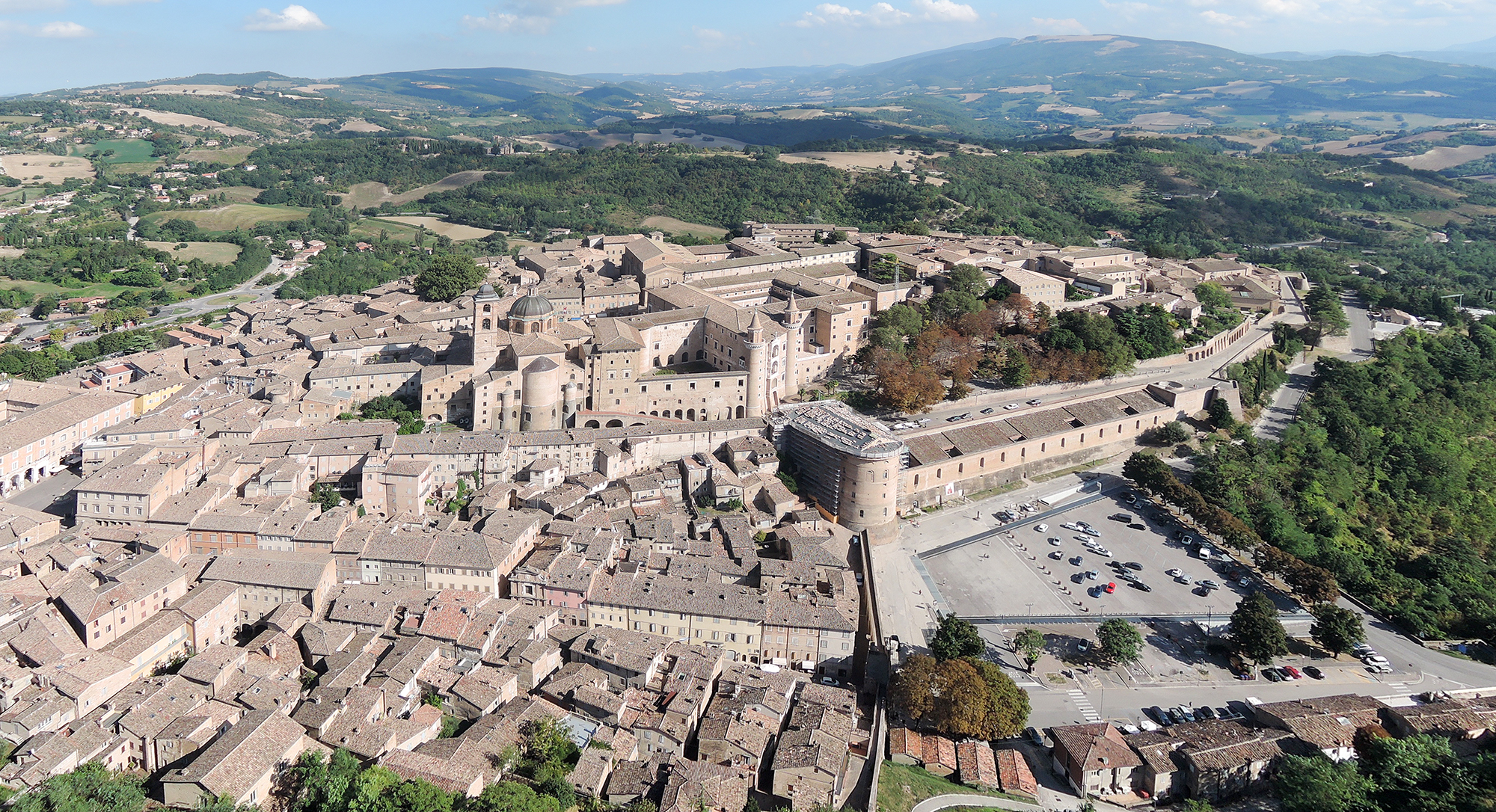
Urbino as seen from a kite

The city lies in a hilly region, at the foothills of the Northern Apennines and the Tuscan-Romagnolo Apennines. It is within the southern area of Montefeltro, an area classified as medium-high seismic risk. Nearly 65 seismic events have affected the town between 1511 and 1998. They include 24 April 1741, when the shocks were stronger than VIII on the Mercalli intensity scale, with an epicenter in Fabriano (where it reached 6.08 on the moment magnitude scale).

== History ==
=== Origins and Middle Ages ===
The originally modest Roman town of Urbinum Mataurense ("the little city on the river Mataurus") became an important strategic stronghold during the Gothic Wars of the 6th century. In 538, it was captured from the Ostrogoths by the Byzantine general Belisarius, and is frequently mentioned by the historian Procopius.

After Pepin the Short presented Urbino to the Papacy in 754–56, the commune benefited from independence until around 1200, when it came into the possession of the House of Montefeltro. These noblemen had no direct authority over the commune; however, they could pressure it to elect them to the position of podestà. Bonconte di Montefeltro obtained this title in 1213: Urbino's population rebelled and formed an alliance with the independent commune of Rimini (1228), finally regaining independence in 1234. Eventually, though, the Montefeltro noblemen took control once more, and held it until 1508. In the struggles between the Guelphs and Ghibellines, when factions supported either the Papacy or the Holy Roman Empire respectively, the 13th and 14th century Montefeltro lords of Urbino were leaders of the Ghibellines of the Marche and in the Romagna region.

=== Period of Federico da Montefeltro ===
The most famous member of the Montefeltro family, Federico da Montefeltro, ruled as Duke of Urbino from 1444 to 1482. He was a condottiere, a diplomat and a patron of art and literature. He rose to power in 1444 as the son of Guidantonio, after a conspiracy and the murder of the legitimate heir Oddantonio.

=== Cesare Borgia and the years of the Duchy Della Rovere ===
Cesare Borgia dispossessed Guidobaldo da Montefeltro, Duke of Urbino, and Elisabetta Gonzaga in 1502, with the complicity of his father, Pope Alexander VI. After the attempt of Pope Leo X to appoint a young Medici as duke, thwarted by the early death of Lorenzo II de Medici in 1519, Urbino was part of the Papal States, under the dynasty of the dukes Della Rovere (1508–1631). They moved the court to the city of Pesaro in 1523 and Urbino began a slow decline that would continue until the last decades of the seventeenth century.

=== Annexation by the Papal States ===
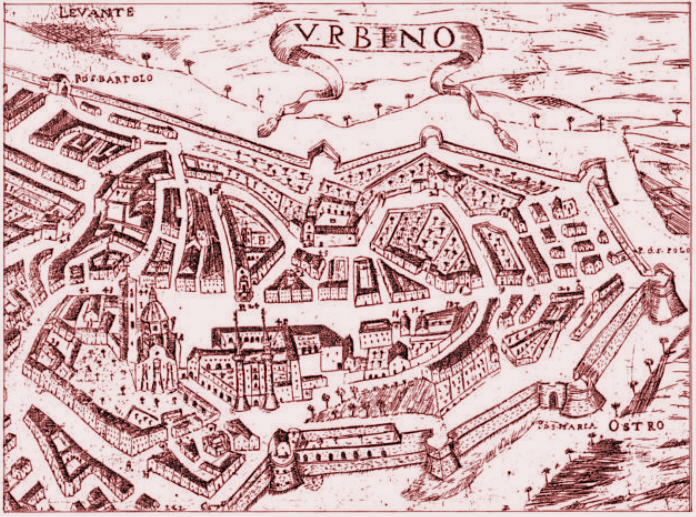
Antique plan of Urbino (1689) by Tommaso Luci

In 1626, Pope Urban VIII definitively incorporated the Duchy into the papal dominions, the gift of the last Della Rovere duke, in retirement after the assassination of his heir, to be governed by the archbishop. The state was ruled thereafter by a papal legate, generally belonging to high ecclesiastical hierarchy. Following the annexation of the duchy by the Papal States, the rich artistic heritage (including furniture) of the Ducal Palace went to form, for the most part, the dowry of the last direct descendant of the Della Rovere, Vittoria della Rovere, who married Ferdinand II de Medici. These works went on to form the core of the future Uffizi Gallery. Among the works that went to Florence is the diptych of the Dukes of Urbino by Piero della Francesca. Other works of the Ducal Palace were brought to Rome, such as the Barberini Ex Tables of Fra Carnevale and the famous library, absorbed entirely by the Vatican Library in 1657.

=== The Albani and the French occupation ===
The eighteenth century opened with the election to the papacy (1701) of Cardinal Giovan Francesco Albani Urbino, under the name of Clement XI. This was a windfall for the city, especially in terms of arts and culture, thanks to funding by Pope Albani and his family. Major renovations took place, such as Palazzo Albani, the town hall, the archbishop's palace, the Chapel Albani (inside the convent of St. Francis), Saint Joseph's Oratory, and the internal structure of the churches of San Francesco, San Domenico and San Agostino. In addition, due to the patronage of the pope and his family, the Urbino Cathedral received many improvements. From July 1717 to November 1718 Urbino hosted the court of James Stuart, the exiled pretender to the British throne, who had the strong backing of the papacy.

With the death of Clement XI in 1721, the city began a long decline that has continued to the present day. After the pope's death, the Albani family remained the main patron of the most significant works until the first half of the nineteenth century. In 1789, the collapse of the cathedral dome following a massive earthquake led to the total renovation of the church.

Between 1797 and 1800 the city was occupied by French troops, like much of northern and central Italy. Urbino and its territory lost many important works of art to the French, who moved objects to Paris or Milan, to the nascent galleries of the Louvre and Brera.

=== Redevelopment of the nineteenth century ===
The century opened with the consecration in 1809 of the new Duomo di Urbino, as designed by the architect Giuseppe Valadier. He also restored the city's Montefeltro-era buildings such as the old seminary, adjacent to the church of St. Sergius, now partly occupied by the Hotel Raffaello.

Following the construction of the New Palace of Alban (1831), designed by architect Peter Ghinelli, which gave rise to the present Piazza della Repubblica that went on to form the first part of the future Corso Garibaldi, the city experienced a number of urban improvements designed to change the face of the city. From the construction of the Sanzio theater (1845–53) came the final realization of Corso Garibaldi, with a covered walkway on the downhill side to that ensure theater-goers were sheltered from rain and snow on their walk to the Piazza della Repubblica, with construction that lasted until the early part of the twentieth century. In addition, another important change was the destruction, in 1868, of a part of the walls to create a customs barrier, called Porta Nuova or barrier Margherita (in honor of Princess Margaret of Savoy), which was necessitated by a new road that ran along a stretch of the walls and was connected to Corso Garibaldi. This resulted in a new urban layout with the large spit of land below the Doge's Palace incorporated into the city, called the Pincio.

These urban transformations brought about a change in access to the city. Instead of passing through narrow, winding streets, through the gates of the walls, now one could enter through the Porta Nuova in an easier and convenient way to arrive in the present Piazza della Repubblica and the Palazzo Ducale (the city center).

This urban renewal reflected many of the ideas of Fulvio Corboli but its design was largely done by the architect Vincenzo Ghinelli.

=== Unification of Italy ===
On 8 September 1860, the Piedmontese troops entered Urbino from Port Saint Lucia, forcing the surrender of the last resistance of the papal army under the portico of the childhood house of Raphael. But it was not until 29 September, with the capture of Ancona, that the total conquest of the Marche region was completed by the Piedmont army.

Between 4 and 5 November, the plebiscite was held for the annexation of the Marche to the Kingdom of Sardinia, which ended with 133,783 votes in favor, 260 votes against and 1,212 invalid ballots. In the province of Urbino (excluding the territory of Pesaro) the count was 21,111 for and 365 against with 29 invalid ballots. Subsequently, on 10 November, the Marche was included in the Statuto Albertino, and then, on 17 December, it was made official with the issuance of a royal decree.

The new government began the confiscation of various ecclesiastical goods, including a good part of the Convent of San Francisco (where a part of a botanical garden, designed by Vincenzo Ghinelli, was located), the monastery of Santa Chiara, that of San Girolamo, and many others.

=== First half of the twentieth century ===
The century began quietly. In addition to the artistic development from the Scuola del Libro, Urbino also began to grow as a university town, with the elevation to university faculty of nineteenth-century School of Pharmacy and the birth of the department of Education (approximately 1934). Due to these changes in the University, an increase in the student population led to housing shortages that highlighted the state of total unpreparedness of the city, so much that for the first time many students were housed in the homes of private citizens. The problem was partly solved with the establishment of the male boarding school "Raphael" at the beginning of the century, and the female boarding school "Laura Battiferri" in approximately 1926.

The fascist dictatorship left its mark on the city, especially from an architectural point of view, with a fascist elementary school "Giovanni Pascoli" (1932) built on the ancient Garden of Saint Lucia (part of the duke's private gardens), the restoration of the palace-Mauruzi Gherardi, then the seat of the court, as well as the Student House, to compensate for the shortage of accommodation as a result of the large increase in university population and housing for the maimed and disabled civilians.

In 1938, the city was designated as the headquarters for the fledgling Soprintendenza alle Gallerie e alle Opere d'Arte delle Marche, roughly translated as the Organization of Galleries and Works of Art of the Marche.

With the outbreak of World War II the city suffered no bombing, thanks to the large red cross painted on the roof of the Ducal Palace and an agreement between the Germans and the Allies. Only towards the end of the war did the retreating German troops try to destroy all the ramparts of the walls, but luckily the mines were tampered with by the workers the Germans had hired from Urbino. During the Second World War, the then Superintendent of the Galleries and Works of Art in Urbino in the Marche Pasquale Rotondi secretly placed around 10,000 priceless works (including those of Giorgione, Piero della Francesca, Paolo Uccello, Titian, Mantegna, Raphael and many more, from all the major museums in Italy) that were being stolen by the Nazis into the Rock of Sassocorvaro. His actions gained worldwide recognition and to this day the Rock of Sassocorvaro is known as the "Ark of Art".

Urbino was liberated from the Nazi occupation on 28 August 1944, thanks to the British V Corps, Polish troops, and the heroic actions of partisan groups in the area. Some of the members of these partisan groups were captured by the Nazis and executed on the current Punto Panoramica, where memorials are now placed celebrating their sacrifice.

=== Urbino and De Carlo ===
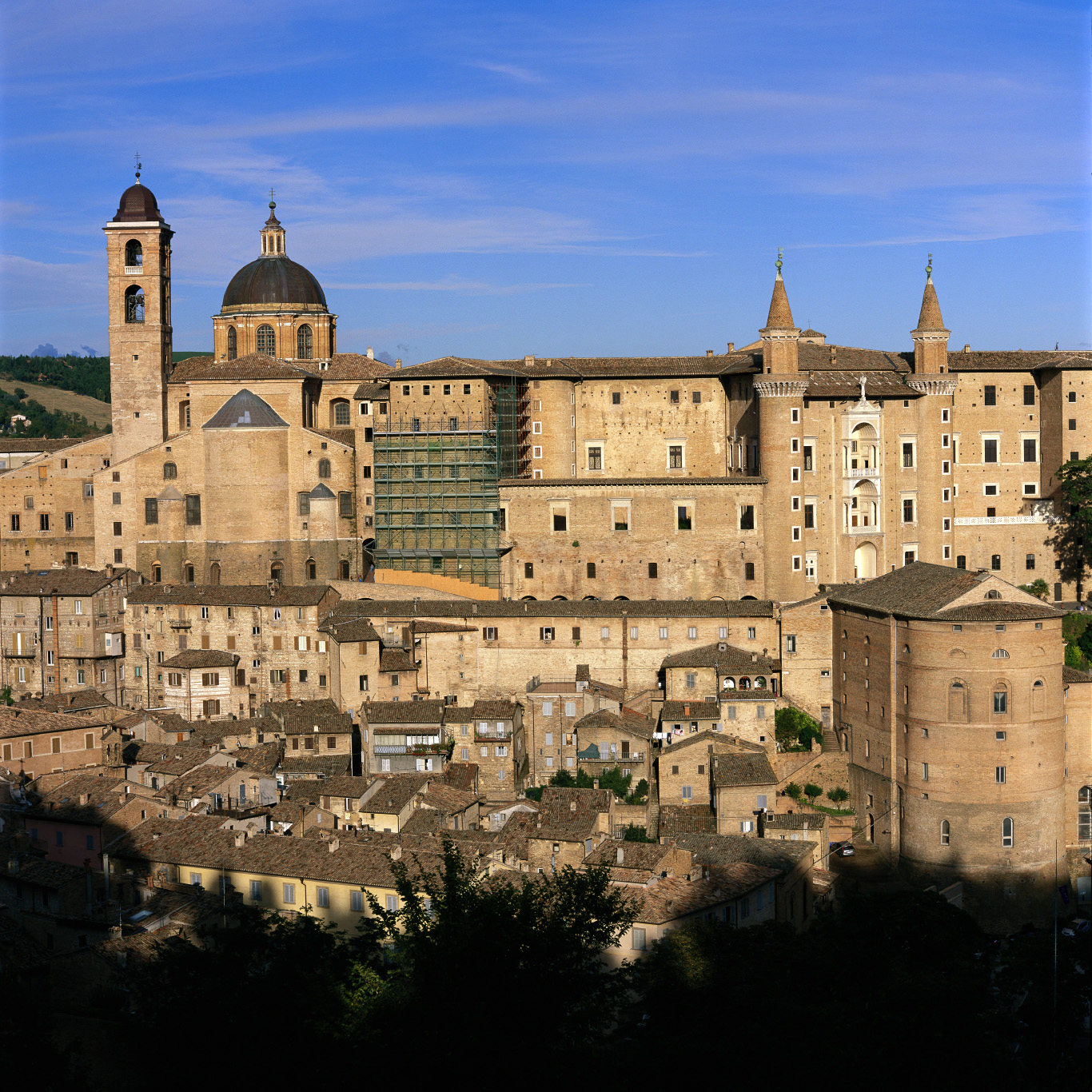
A view from Urbino

The second half of the twentieth century was characterized in Urbino by the cooperation with the major public institutions (the University and the City) by the architect Giancarlo De Carlo. This relationship began in 1956 when Carlo Bo, former rector of the University, commissioned from De Carlo the internal renovation project of Montefeltro- Bonaventure building, headquarters of the University. Immediately after that, the Genoese architect was commissioned by the City to prepare the General Plan (1958–64) aimed at the recovery of the historical center, which had been in poor condition and was in danger of losing several neighborhoods including the Palazzo Ducale to the land subsidence below. This problem was solved thanks to state funding derived from two special laws enacted for the city (in 1968 and in 1982 ).

Subsequently, De Carlo realized several projects for the university including the college's dormitories, near the Capuchin church outside the city center, an interesting example of how architecture can merge with the surrounding landscape. He also completed projects like the construction of the department of Magisterium (1968–76), the restructuring of the department of Law ( 1966–68 ) and the Battiferri building (1986–99) for the department of Economics. They are three significant examples of the inclusion of a contemporary architecture in an ancient surrounding, and are still studied today.

The seventies were marked by a collaboration with the Municipality for a project called Operation Mercatale (1969–72), which included the construction of a multi-story underground car park under Torricini's famous Ducal Palace and the restoration of the helical ramp under the theater by Francesco di Giorgio Martini (1971–75), in collaboration with the City. They also developed the project of renovation of the Sanzio theater (1977–82) and the renovation project, much discussed, of the ancient Ducal Stables. In addition, thanks to the close relationship with De Carlo, the city has hosted twice (1976–81, and 1992–93) the laboratories of the ILAUD, founded and directed by the Genoese architect.

One of the last of De Carlo actions was the preparation, between 1989 and 1994, of the New General Plan.

== Maiolica ==
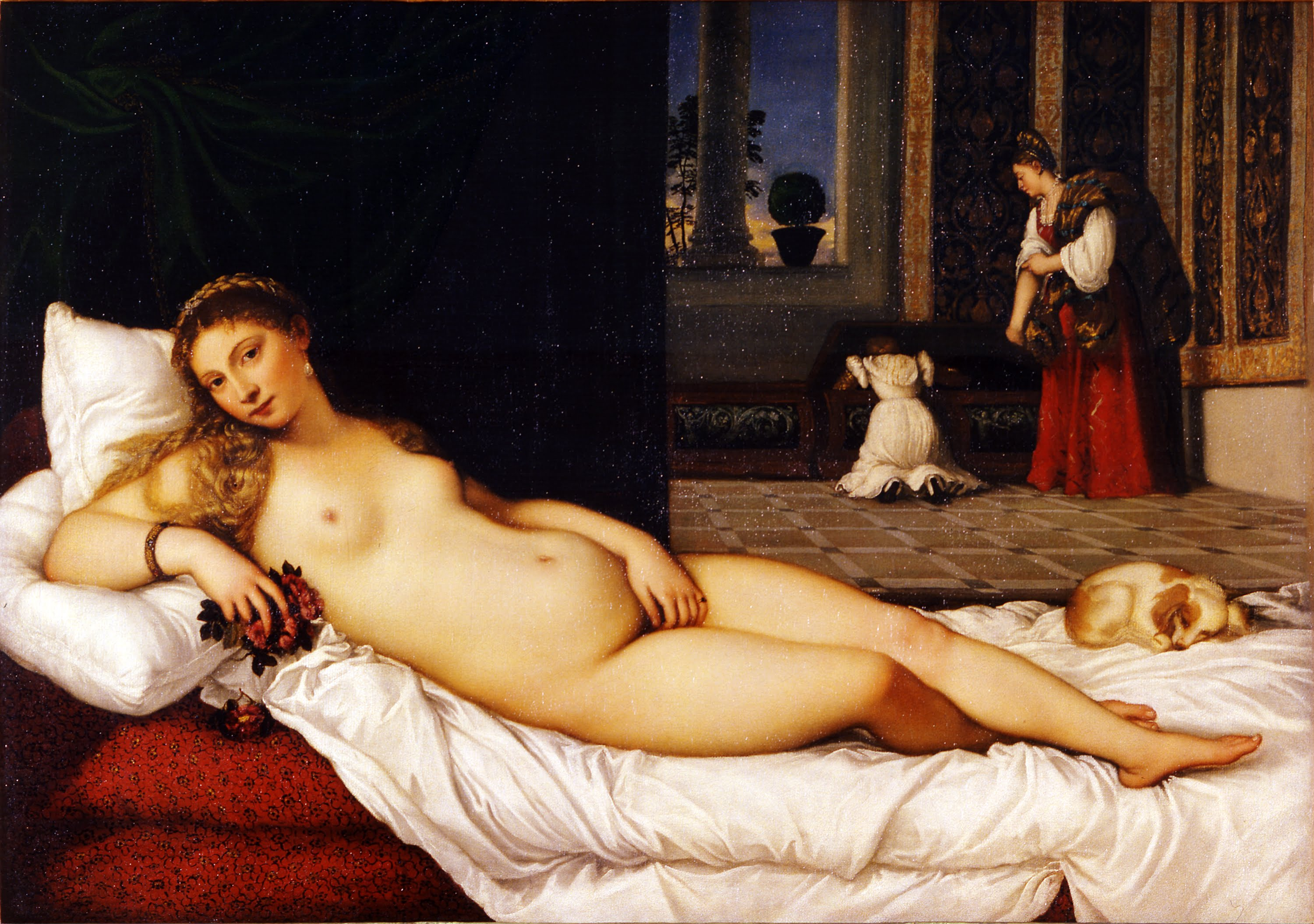
The portrait of Venus of Urbino is named after from the Duchy of Urbino, through the title of Guidobaldo II as the Duke of Urbino, the owner who bought it from Titian.

The clay earth of Urbino, which still supports industrial brickworks, supplied a cluster of earthenware manufactories (botteghe) making the tin-glazed pottery known as maiolica. Simple local wares were being made in the 15th century at Urbino, but after 1520 the Della Rovere dukes, Francesco Maria I della Rovere and his successor Guidobaldo II, encouraged the industry, which exported wares throughout Italy, first in a manner called istoriato using engravings after Mannerist painters, then in a style of light arabesques and grottesche after the manner of Raphael's stanze at the Vatican. Other centers of 16th century wares in the Duchy of Urbino were at Gubbio and Castel Durante. The great name in Urbino majolica was that of Nicolo Pillipario's son Guido Fontana.

== Main attractions ==
=== Palaces and public buildings ===
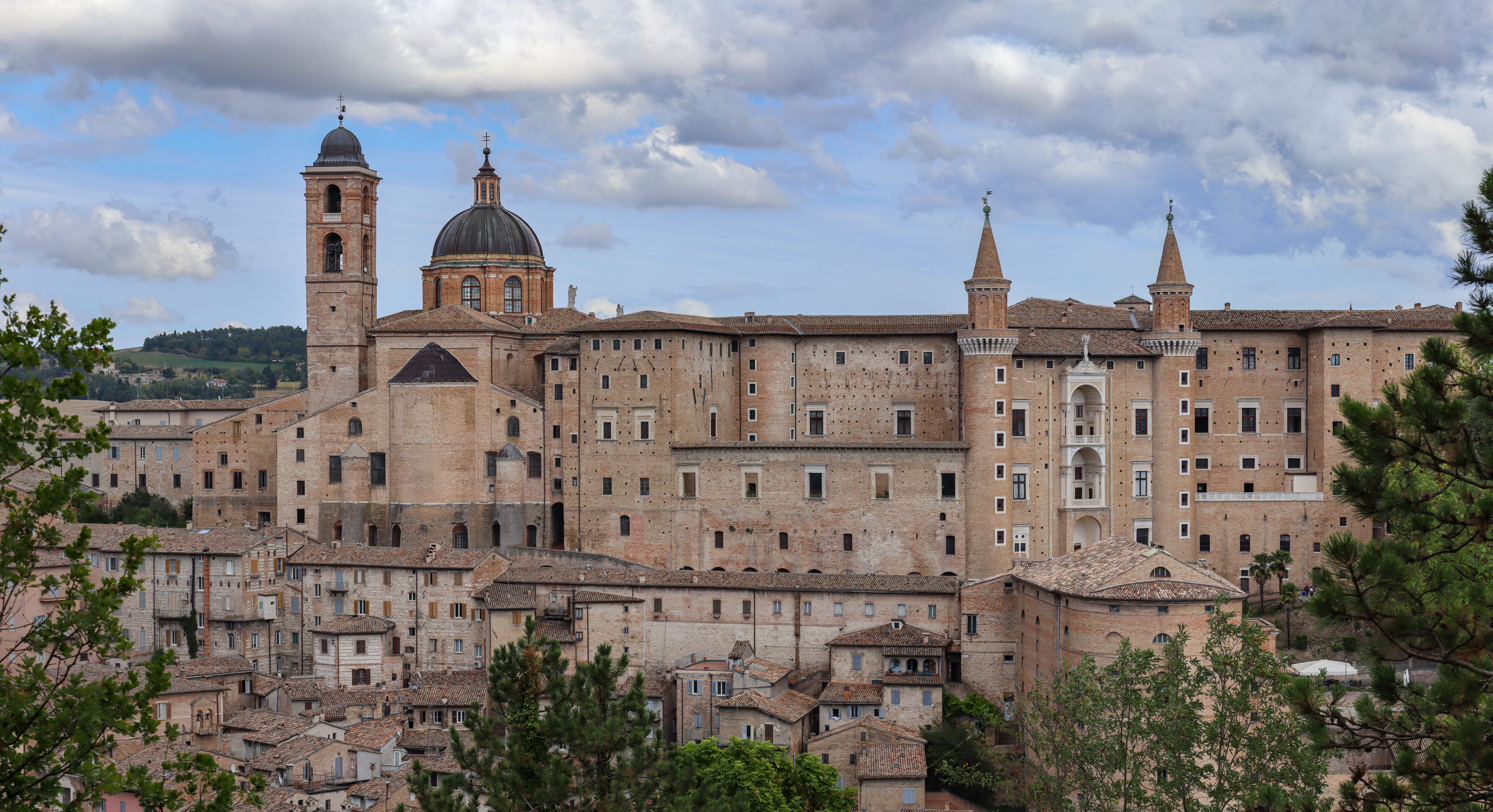
The Ducal Palace

- The main attraction of Urbino is the Palazzo Ducale, begun in the second half of the 15th century by Federico II da Montefeltro. It houses the Galleria Nazionale delle Marche, one of the most important collections of Renaissance paintings in the world.
- Other buildings include Palazzo Albani (17th century), Palazzo Odasi and Palazzo Passionei.
- The Albornoz Fortress (known locally as La Fortezza), built by the eponymous Papal legate in the 14th century. In 1507–1511, when the Della Rovere added a new series of walls to the city, the rock was enclosed in them. It is now a public park.
- Raphael's house and monument (1897).

=== Churches ===
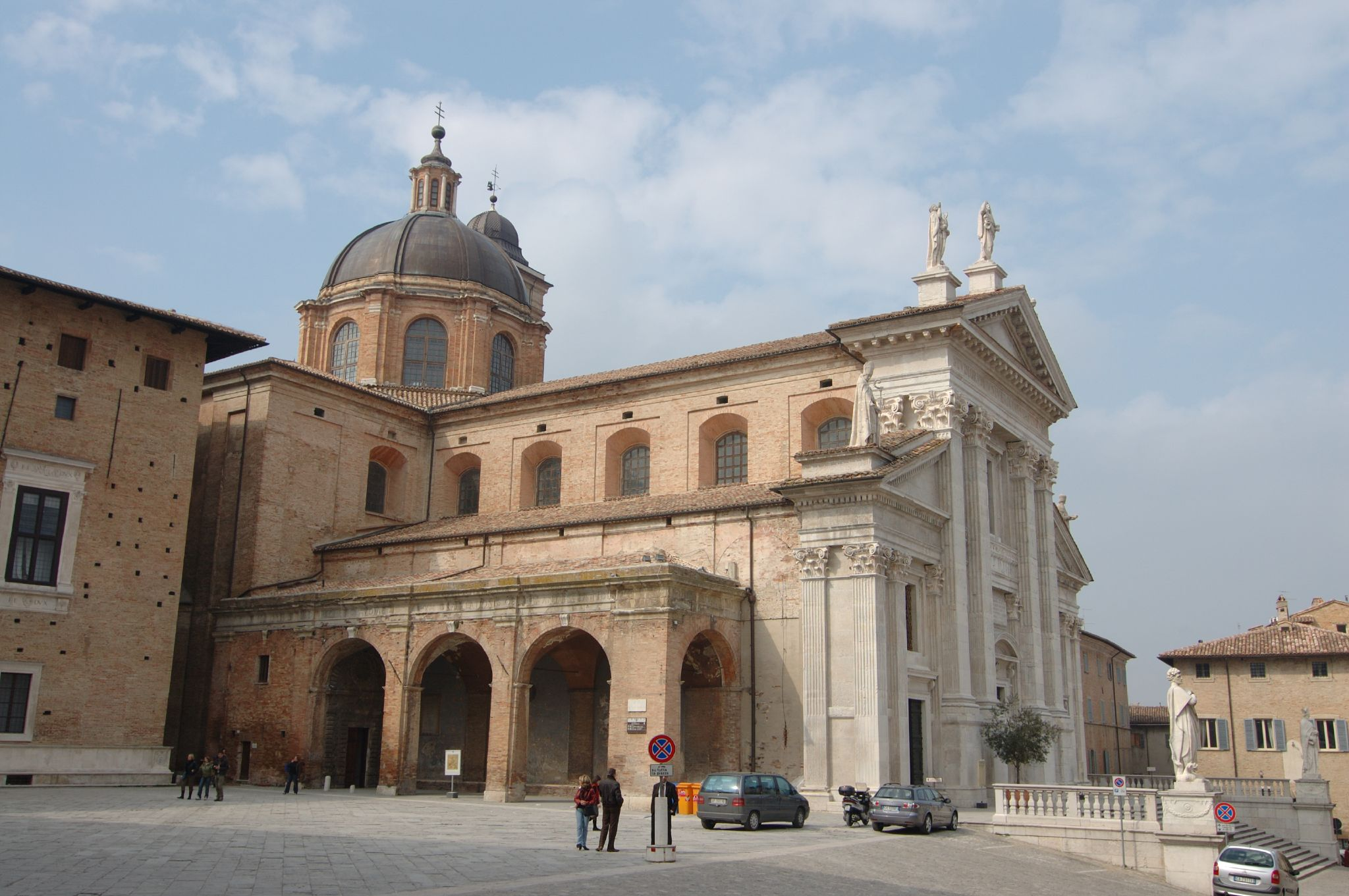
The Duomo

- Duomo: the Cathedral of Urbino was founded in 1021 atop a 6th-century religious edifice. Federico II commissioned the design from the architect Francesco di Giorgio Martini, who also designed the Ducal Palace. Finished in 1604, the Duomo had a simple plan with a nave and two aisles, and was destroyed by an earthquake in 1789. The church was rebuilt in Neoclassic style by the architect Giuseppe Valadier, with work completed in 1801. The new church has a soaring dome, and houses a St Sebastian (1557), an Assumption (1701) by Maratta, and a famous Last Supper (1603–1608) by Federico Barocci.
- Sant'Agostino: the church was built in 13th-century Romanesque style, but largely modified in following centuries. The façade has a late-14th century almond portal in Gothic-Romanesque style, while the interior is greatly decorated. It houses a carved choir from the 16th century, created for the marriage of Costanzo Sforza and Camilla of Aragona. The bell tower is from the 15th century.
- San Francesco: This 14th-century church was originally a Gothic-Romanesque edifice, but an 18th-century restoration has left only the portico and the bell tower. The interior has a nave and two aisles, and houses the Pardon of St Francis, a 15th-century work by Barocci.
- Oratory of San Giovanni Battista: the oratory has 15th-century frescoes by Lorenzo Salimbeni
- Oratory of San Giuseppe (early 16th century), composed of two chapels: one of which contains a 16th-century stucco presepio or Nativity scene by Federico Brandani with highly naturalistic, life-size figures.
- San Bernardino: church outside the city center, housing the tombs of the Dukes of Urbino.

=== Other points of interest ===
- Orto Botanico "Pierina Scaramella", a botanical garden.
- University of Urbino, housed in various old and new buildings within the city centre.

== People ==
- Battista Malatesta (1384–1448), Italian Renaissance poet
- Bernardino Baldi (1553–1617), Italian mathematician and writer
- Clorinda Corradi (1804–1877), Italian opera singer
- Crispino Agostinucci (1797–1856), bishop of Montefeltro
- Donato Bramante (1444–1514), Italian architect and painter. He was born nearby, and witnessed Laurana's work going up while he was a youth.
- Elisabetta Gonzaga (1471–1526), Duchess of Urbino
- Federico Barocci (c. 1535–1612), Italian painter
- Federico III da Montefeltro (1422–1482), Duke of Urbino, medieval condottiere and patron of the arts
- Federico Zuccari (c. 1540/1541–1609) and Taddeo Zuccari (1529–1566), Italian painters. They were born nearby.
- Fernando Aiuti (1935–2019), Italian immunologist
- Francesco Puccinotti (1794–1872), Italian pathologist
- Giovanni Francesco Albani, Pope Clement XI
- Giovanni Pelingotto (1240–1304), Italian Roman Catholic, Secular Franciscan Order member
- Giovanni Santi (1435–1494), Italian painter and decorator, father of Raphael. He was born nearby.
- Guidobaldo II della Rovere (1514–1574), Duke of Urbino. He commissioned the Venus of Urbino painting.
- Marica Branchesi (1977), Italian astrophysicist
- Muzio Oddi (1569–1639), Italian mathematician, architect, military engineer and writer
- Ottaviano Petrucci (1466–1539), Italian printer, inventor of the music print with movable type. He was born nearby.
- Paolo Volponi (1924–1994), Italian writer and poet
- Polydore Vergil or Virgil (1470–1555), chronicler in England
- Raffaello Carboni (1817–1875), Italian writer
- Raphael Gualazzi (1981), Italian jazz pianist and singer, runner-up in the 2011 Eurovision Song Contest
- Raphael (1483–1520), Italian painter. His family's house is a museum-shrine.
- Stefano Sensi (1995), Italian football player
- Umberto Piersanti (1941), Italian poet and writer
- Valentino Rossi (1979), Italian motorcycle racer, multiple MotoGP World Champion
- Domenica Ercolani (1910–2023), Italian supercentenarian, oldest person in Italy from 2022 to 2023

== Twin towns – sister cities ==
Urbino is twinned with:

- Locarno, Switzerland, since 1976

Urbino also cooperates with:

- Blois, France, since 1999
- Ascoli Piceno and Recanati, Italy, since 2026

== Climate ==
Climate data for Urbino (1991–2020)
| Month | Jan | Feb | Mar | Apr | May | Jun | Jul | Aug | Sep | Oct | Nov | Dec | Year |
|---|---|---|---|---|---|---|---|---|---|---|---|---|---|
| Mean daily maximum °C (°F) | 7.1 (44.8) | 8.0 (46.4) | 11.8 (53.2) | 15.6 (60.1) | 20.4 (68.7) | 25.3 (77.5) | 28.0 (82.4) | 27.9 (82.2) | 22.2 (72.0) | 17.1 (62.8) | 11.9 (53.4) | 8.1 (46.6) | 17.0 (62.5) |
| Daily mean °C (°F) | 4.7 (40.5) | 5.4 (41.7) | 8.8 (47.8) | 12.2 (54.0) | 16.8 (62.2) | 21.3 (70.3) | 23.9 (75.0) | 24.0 (75.2) | 18.8 (65.8) | 14.4 (57.9) | 9.6 (49.3) | 5.7 (42.3) | 13.8 (56.8) |
| Mean daily minimum °C (°F) | 2.3 (36.1) | 2.7 (36.9) | 5.7 (42.3) | 8.8 (47.8) | 13.1 (55.6) | 17.3 (63.1) | 19.7 (67.5) | 20.0 (68.0) | 15.4 (59.7) | 11.7 (53.1) | 7.3 (45.1) | 3.3 (37.9) | 10.6 (51.1) |
| Average precipitation mm (inches) | 54 (2.1) | 59 (2.3) | 69 (2.7) | 67 (2.6) | 70 (2.8) | 58 (2.3) | 46 (1.8) | 69 (2.7) | 69 (2.7) | 88 (3.5) | 99 (3.9) | 66 (2.6) | 814 (32.0) |
| Average precipitation days (≥ 1.0 mm) | 8 | 8 | 9 | 9 | 9 | 7 | 4 | 6 | 6 | 9 | 9 | 9 | 93 |
Source 1: Istituto Superiore per la Protezione e la Ricerca Ambientale
Source 2: Enea-Casaccia (precipitation 1961–1990)

== See also ==
- Archdiocese of Urbino-Urbania-Sant'Angelo in Vado
- Dukes of Urbino
- Renaissance in Urbino

== Sources ==
- Negroni, F. (1993). Il Duomo di Urbino. Urbino.
