= Urbania =

- Comune
- Comune di Urbania
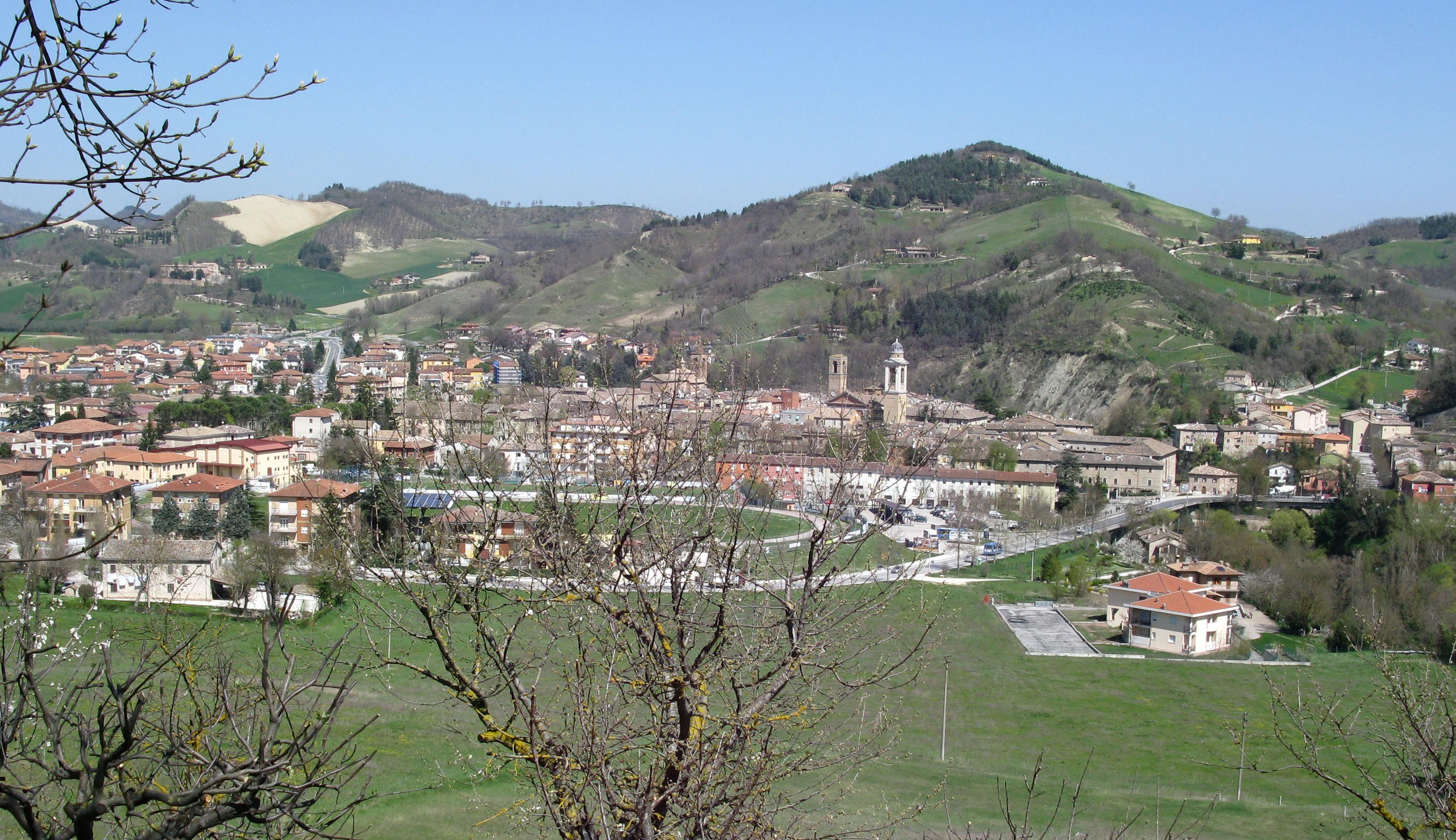
- View of Urbania

- Location within Italy Location within Marche
- Coordinates: 43°40′N 12°31′E
- Country: Italy
- Region: Marche
- Province: Pesaro and Urbino (PU)
- Frazioni: Barca, Campi Resi, Campolungo, Gualdi, Muraglione, Orsaiola, Ponte San Giovanni, San Lorenzo in Torre, San Vincenzo in Candigliano, Santa Maria del Piano, Santa Maria in Campolungo, Santa Maria in Spinaceti

Area
  - Total: 77.53 km^{2} (29.93 sq mi)
- Elevation: 273 m (896 ft)

Population (31-07-2022)
  - Total: 6,829
  - Density: 88.08/km^{2} (228.1/sq mi)
- Demonym(s): Urbaniesi, Durantini
- Time zone: UTC+1 (CET)
  - Summer (DST): UTC+2 (CEST)
- Postal code: 61049
- Dialing code: 0722
- Patron saint: St. Christopher
- Saint day: July 25
- Website: Official website

Urbania is a comune (municipality) in the Province of Pesaro e Urbino in the Italian region of Marche, located about 80 kilometres (50 mi) west of Ancona and about 40 kilometres (25 mi) southwest of Pesaro, next to the river Metauro.

Urbania borders the following municipalities: Acqualagna, Apecchio, Cagli, Fermignano, Peglio, Piobbico, Sant'Angelo in Vado, Urbino.

It is a famous ceramics and majolica production centre. In recent years, it has become more closely associated with the Befana folk tradition.

== History ==
Originally known as Castel delle Ripe, it was a free commune of the Guelph party. In 1277 it was destroyed by the Ghibellines, then rebuilt by the Provençal Guillaume Durand in 1284 and christened Castel Durante. Later it was ruled by the Brancaleoni family. When the latter were ousted, the city offered itself to the Dukes of Urbino (Gentile Brancaleoni was the first wife of Federico da Montefeltro, later Duke of Urbino), who used the palace in the city as summer residence and had it restored by architects such as Francesco di Giorgio Martini. The last della Rovere duke, Francesco Maria II, is buried in the Ducal Palace of Urbania.

In 1631 it became part of the Papal States. Five years later its name changed to the current one, in honor of Pope Urban VIII.

On 23 January 1944 Urbania was bombed by the Allies, resulting in the deaths of 250 civilians. It was a Sunday so the people had gathered in the town, increasing the number of victims.

After World War II Urbania received the Bronze Medal for Military Valour for the deeds of its citizens during the partisan warfare.

== Geology ==
The base of the Chattian international stratigraphical stage is located in Urbania and is marked by a GSSP and commemorative sign which were installed there in May 2017.

== Main sights ==
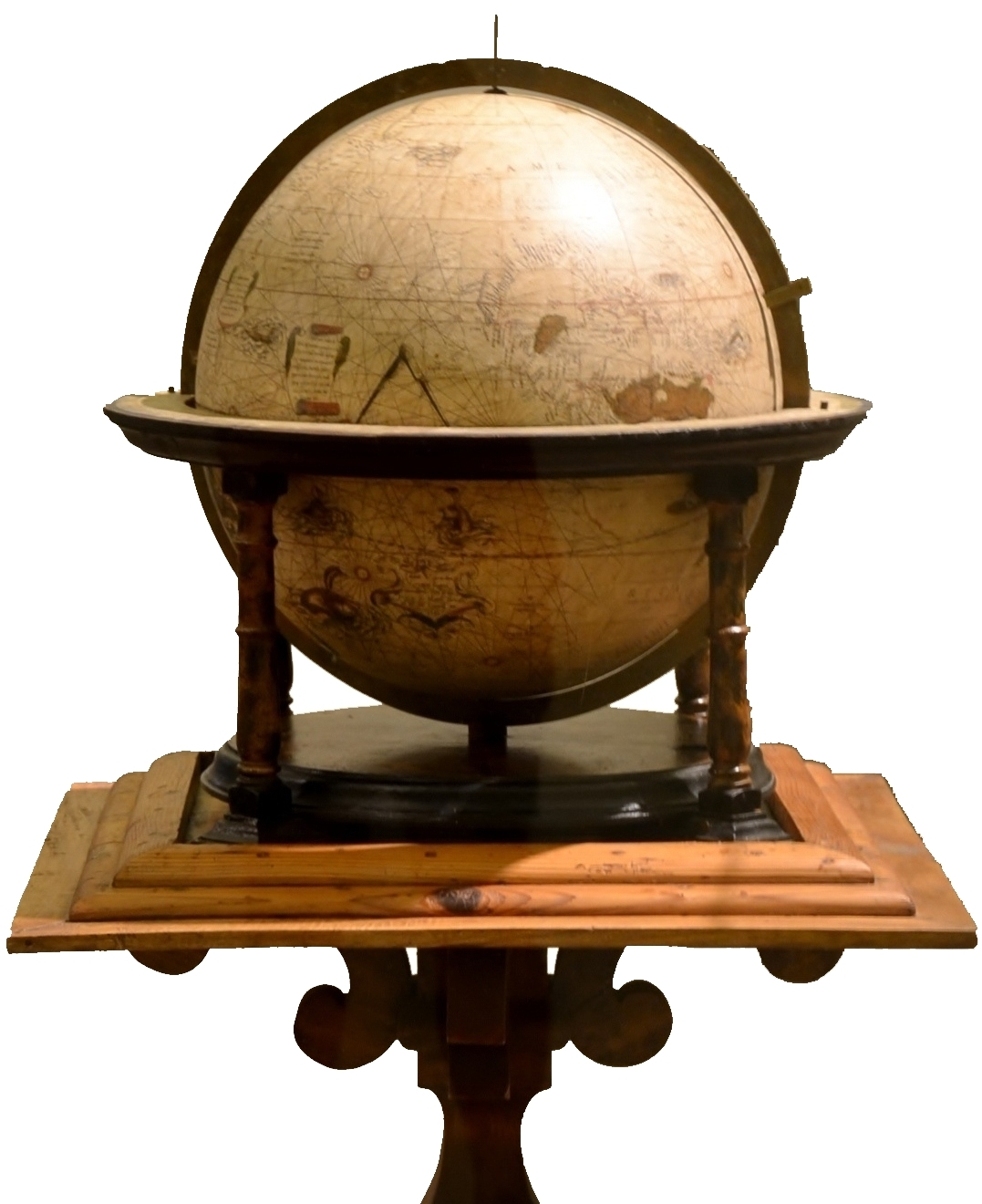
Globe signed by Mercator and dated 1541; now in the 'Palazzo Ducale' museum. It is one of about 22 existing Mercator globes.

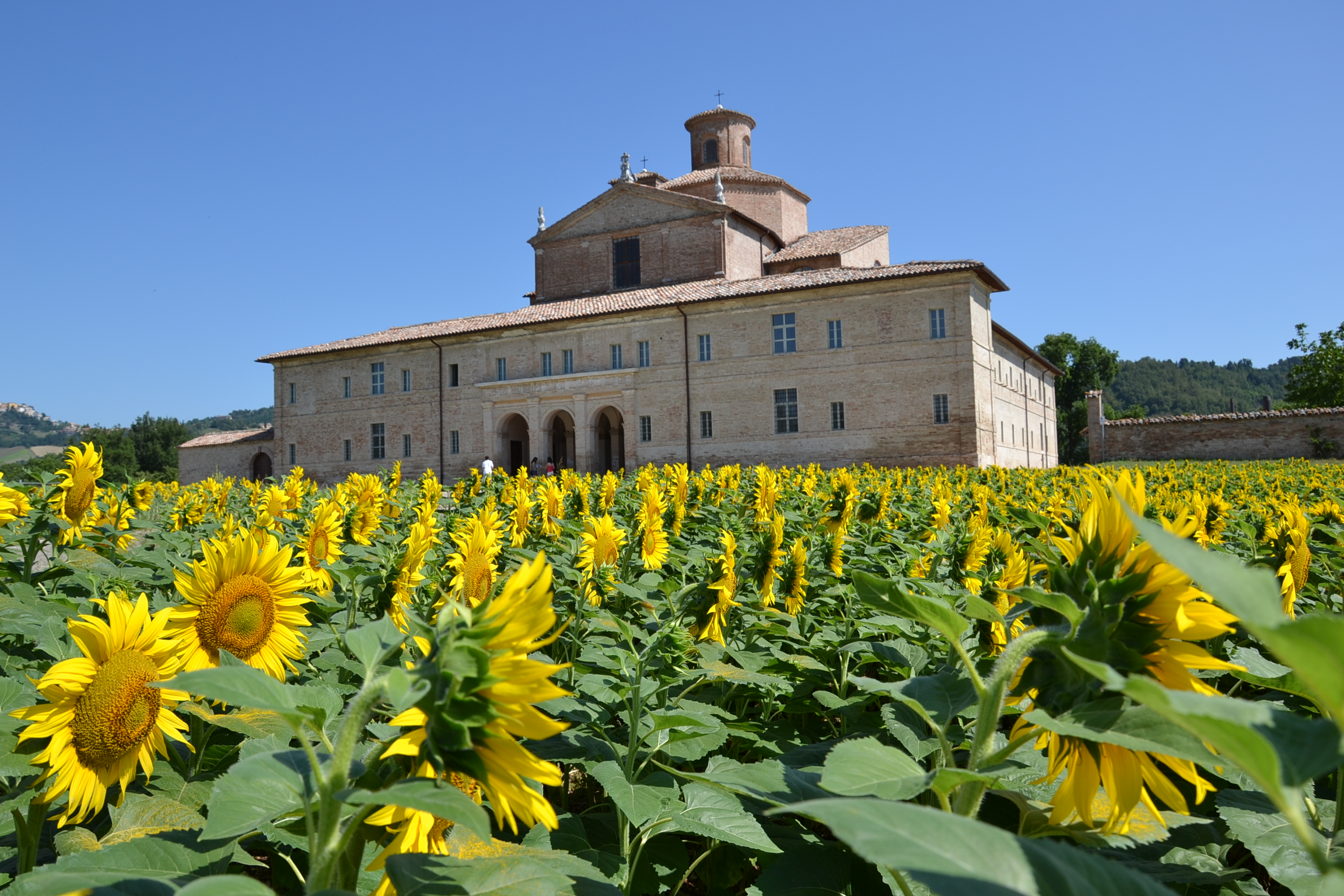
The main entrance of the Barco Ducale viewed from south west

- Ducal Palace: The palace houses a museum and a library. Among the prize holdings are globes made by the Flemish-born, German natural scientist Gerardus Mercator between 1541 and 1551.
- Chiesa dei Morti (Church of the Dead), with 18 natural mummies from the Middle Ages and the Renaissance exposed behind the altar.
- The medieval walls.
- The 'Barco Ducale' is one kilometer outside of the town. It was erected in 1465. After an earthquake, it was rebuilt between 1741 and 1771. Normally you can not enter the building.
- Urbania Cathedral
- Santa Caterina
- Santa Chiara
- Santissimo Crocifisso
- San Francesco
- Santa Maria Maddalena

== Population History ==
Historical population

Year	Pop.	±%
1861	4,701	—
1871	5,028	+7.0%
1881	5,138	+2.2%
1901	5,715	+11.2%
1911	5,941	+4.0%

Year	Pop.	±%
1921	6,250	+5.2%
1931	6,818	+9.1%
1936	6,739	−1.2%
1951	7,008	+4.0%
1961	6,212	−11.4%

Year	Pop.	±%
1971	5,869	−5.5%
1981	6,326	+7.8%
1991	6,365	+0.6%
2001	6,643	+4.4%

Source: Data from ISTAT
