= List of municipalities of the Province of Pesaro and Urbino =

The following is a list of the 50 municipalities (comuni) of the Province of Pesaro and Urbino in the region of Marche in Italy.

== List ==
Municipality	Population (2026)	Area (km²)	Density
Acqualagna	4,153	50.69	81.9
Apecchio	1,663	103.11	16.1
Belforte all'Isauro	728	12.29	59.2
Borgo Pace	520	56.22	9.2
Cagli	7,878	226.46	34.8
Cantiano	1,962	83.25	23.6
Carpegna	1,674	28.94	57.8
Cartoceto	7,955	23.20	342.9
Colli al Metauro	12,349	46.17	267.5
Fano	59,871	121.84	491.4
Fermignano	8,268	43.70	189.2
Fossombrone	9,028	106.88	84.5
Fratte Rosa	827	15.63	52.9
Frontino	290	10.37	28.0
Frontone	1,192	36.08	33.0
Gabicce Mare	5,411	4.94	1,095.3
Gradara	4,899	17.53	279.5
Isola del Piano	517	23.30	22.2
Lunano	1,412	15.01	94.1
Macerata Feltria	1,880	40.07	46.9
Mercatello sul Metauro	1,320	68.36	19.3
Mercatino Conca	1,078	13.95	77.3
Mombaroccio	2,156	28.21	76.4
Mondavio	3,592	29.64	121.2
Mondolfo	14,406	22.82	631.3
Monte Cerignone	568	18.24	31.1
Monte Grimano Terme	1,137	23.97	47.4
Monte Porzio	2,852	18.29	155.9
Montecalvo in Foglia	2,779	18.25	152.3
Montefelcino	2,427	39.01	62.2
Montelabbate	7,066	19.57	361.1
Peglio	690	21.36	32.3
Pergola	5,745	112.40	51.1
Pesaro	95,270	152.81	623.5
Petriano	2,814	11.27	249.7
Piandimeleto	2,052	39.90	51.4
Pietrarubbia	652	13.29	49.1
Piobbico	1,808	48.20	37.5
San Costanzo	4,648	40.89	113.7
San Lorenzo in Campo	3,157	28.80	109.6
Sant'Angelo in Vado	3,905	67.34	58.0
Sant'Ippolito	1,506	19.88	75.8
Sassocorvaro Auditore	4,875	87.55	55.7
Serra Sant'Abbondio	846	32.80	25.8
Tavoleto	831	12.41	67.0
Tavullia	8,018	42.07	190.6
Terre Roveresche	5,182	70.37	73.6
Urbania	6,888	77.53	88.8
Urbino	13,868	226.50	61.2
Vallefoglia	14,943	39.57	377.6

== See also ==
- List of municipalities of Marche
- List of municipalities of Italy
