= Cesano (river) =

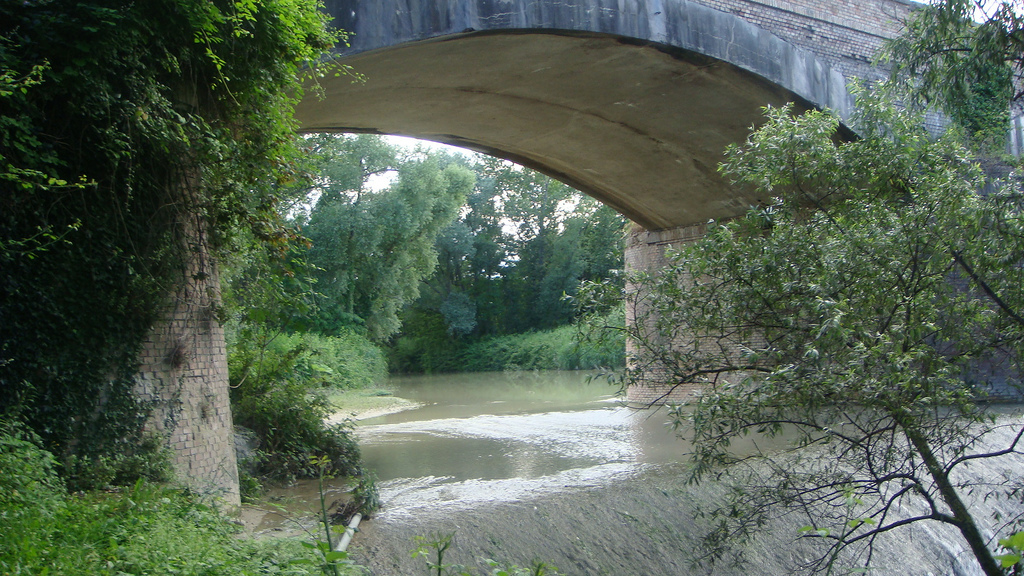

Location
- Country: Italy

Physical characteristics
- Source
  - location: Marche
  - elevation: 1,701 m (5,581 ft) above sea level
- Mouth: Adriatic Sea
  - coordinates: 43.7505°N 13.1722°E
- Length: 62 km (39 mi)
- Discharge
  - average: 5 m^{3}/s (180 cu ft/s)

The Cesano is a river in the Marche region of Italy. Its source is near Monte Catria on the border between the province of Perugia and the province of Pesaro e Urbino. The river flows northeast through Pesaro e Urbino before forming the border between Pesaro e Urbino and the province of Ancona for a short distance. It continues flowing northeast through Pesaro e Urbino and flows past Pergola before becoming the border with Ancona again near San Lorenzo in Campo. The river flows northeast near Mondavio, Corinaldo and Monte Porzio before the province of Ancona extends westward beyond the bank of the river for a short distance near Mondolfo. Finally, the river flows into the Adriatic Sea north of Senigallia and south of Marotta and Fano.

In Roman times the Cesano was known as Suasanus, since it passed through the city of Suasa.

Under the river's bed a petrified forest from 50,000 years ago has been discovered.
