= Auditore =

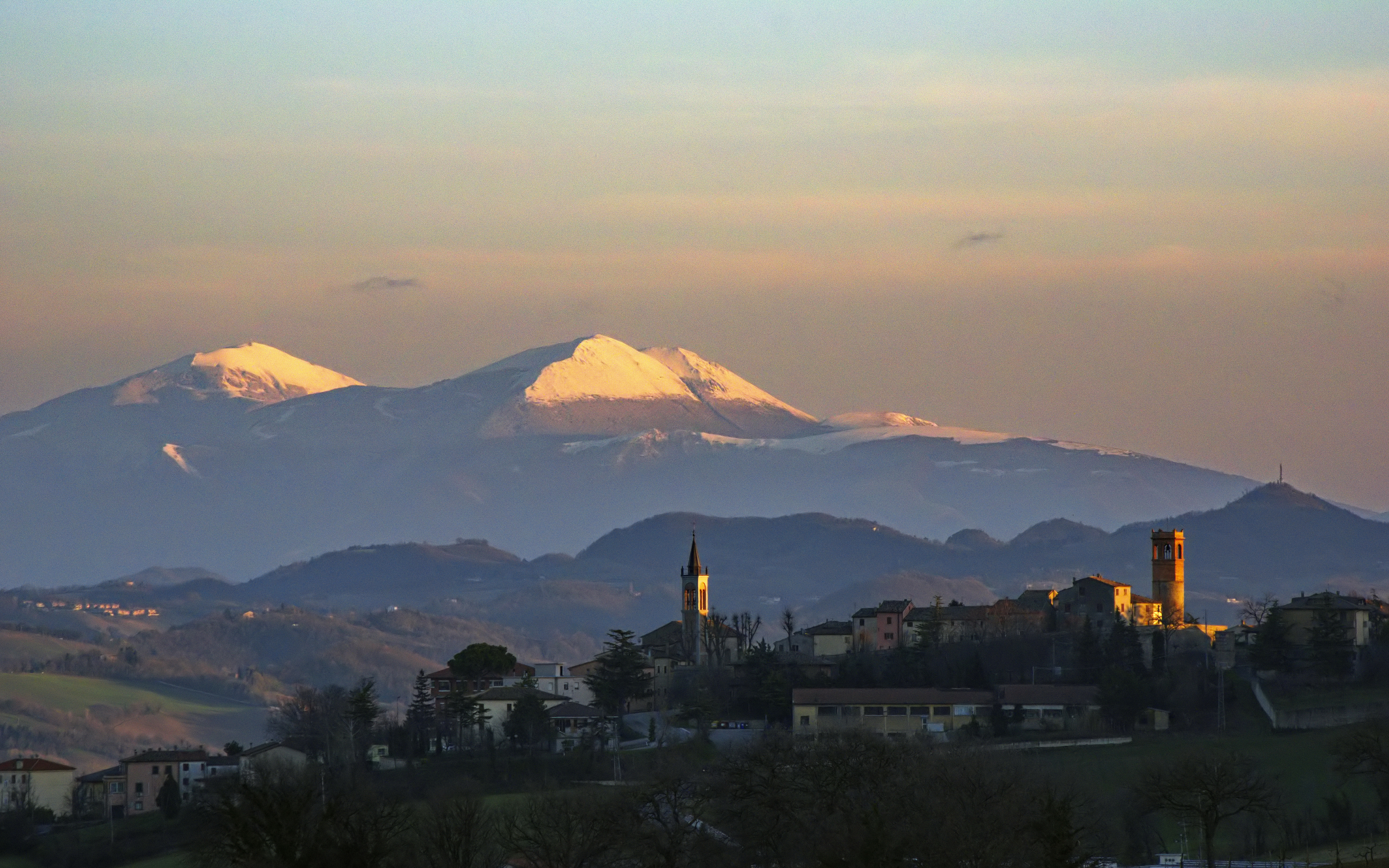
View of Auditore with Monte Catria in the background.

Auditore is a frazione of the comune of Sassocorvaro Auditore in the Province of Pesaro e Urbino in the Italian region Marche, located about 80 kilometres (50 mi) northwest of Ancona and about 30 kilometres (19 mi) southwest of Pesaro. It was a separate comune until 31 December 2018.
