= Olivuccio di Ciccarello =

Italian painter

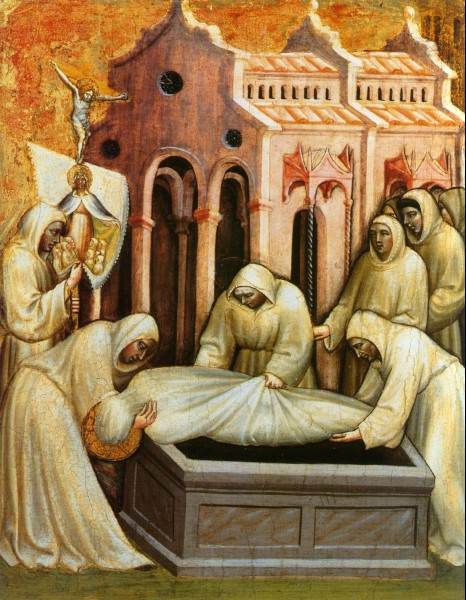
Works of Mercy (To bury the dead), Vatican Museums.

Olivuccio di Ciccarello (died 1439) was an Italian painter. Little is known of his life. He was a native of Camerino and was active from 1388 until his death. In 2002 works formerly attributed to an obscure painter named Carlo da Camerino were re-attributed to Olivuccio di Ciccarello as it had become clear Carlo da Camerino had never existed.

He worked at Ancona, where he was the most important painter of the gothic painting school.

== Carlo da Camerino ==
Carlo da Camerino was the name given by an Italian art historian to identify an Italian painter who was presumed to have been active in the Marche region around the turn of the 15th century. A painted Crucifix, signed and dated in 1396, made for the church of San Michele Arcangelo in Macerata Feltria was attributed to this artist as well as other works in the Marche region.

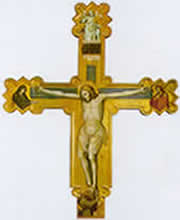
Crucifix, now attributed to Olivuccio di Ciccarello

Research published in 2002 made clear that the name 'Carlo da Camerino' was based on a misreading of the inscription on the Crucifix in the church of San Michele Arcangelo, which reads as follows:

ALV......DECI..CARELLU DA CAMERINO PIN...

The art historian Cesare Brandi interpreted in 1935 the inscription as the signature of its author:

................CAROLLU DA CAMERINO PINXIT

From that moment the hypothesis of the existence of a painter of the Marche region by the name Carlo da Camerino was formed and subsequently many works were attributed to this artist including a Madonna with Child in Mondavio, dating from the year 1400.

In 2002, on the occasion of an exhibition on the Quattrocento in Camerino, the art historian Matteo Mazzalupi re-interpreted the inscription as:

ALVUCCIU DE CICCARELLU DA CAMERINO PINXIT

thus assigning the painting to Olivuccio di Ciccarello of Camerino.

As a result, in 2002, all works attributed formerly to Carlo da Camerino have been re-attributed to Ciccarello, which suggests a unanimous agreement among art historians regarding the re-interpretation and attribution.

== Works ==
His works have undergone a remarkable dispersion, and are now exhibited in museums in various countries: in Italy: (Ancona, Macerata Feltria, Urbino, Rome, Bergamo and Milan), in other European countries" (Strasbourg, Cambridge, Stockholm, Zagreb) and in America: (Baltimore, Cleveland, Santiago).

== Selected works ==
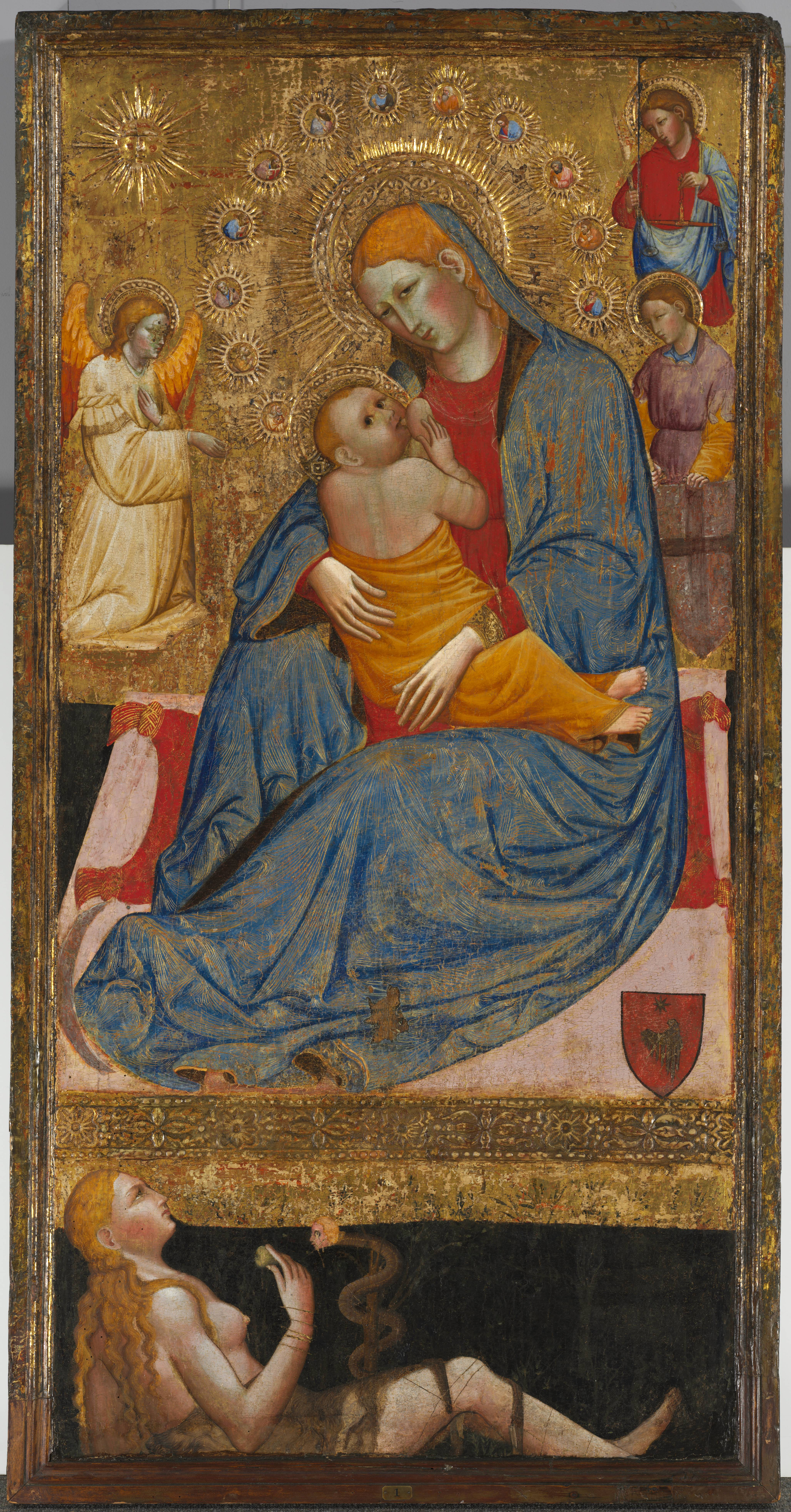
The Madonna of Humility with the Temptation of Eve

- St. Francis of Assisi, Strasbourg, Musée des Beaux-Arts
- Beheading of St. John the Baptist, Santiago, from Ancona, Misericordia church.
- Crucifixion, Zagreb, Grossmayer Gallery, already generally attributed to the "School of Ancona"
- Coronation of the Virgin, Stockholm, National Museum
- Nine angels and two saints (first board), Cambridge, Fitzwilliam Museum
- Nine angels and two saints (second board), Cambridge, Fitzwilliam Museum
- Madonna of Humility, three archangels, twelve apostles, and the temptation of Eve, Cleveland, Cleveland Museum of Art
- Triptych: Madonna nursing the Child with Saints, Taft Museum, Cincinnati
- Triptych, Walters Art Museum, Baltimore

- Madonna and Child
- St. Peter and St. John the Baptist
- St. Paul and St. Francis

- Works of Mercy, (six panels), tempera, (1410–1420), Vatican Museums originally from Ancona, Misericordia church
- Madonna and Child, (tempera), Civic Museum and Pinacoteca, in Mondavio, Province of Pesaro and Urbino. (1400)
- Crucifix, Church of St. Michael the Archangel, Macerata Feltria, Province of Pesaro and Urbino. (1396)
- Dormitio Virginis, (tempera) 113x170 cm, Civic Art Gallery, Ancona. (15th century)
- Madonna dell'Umiltà e angeli, (tempera) 73x51 cm, Civic Art Gallery, Ancona. (15th century)
- Circumcision, (tempera), Civic Art Gallery, Ancona. (15th century)
- Crowned Virgin (fresco fragment), Ancona, Civic Art Gallery
- Our Lady of Mercy with a holy martyr, (1410–1420), Ancona, Diocesan Museum
- Blessed Filippo from Todi, Ancona, Diocesan Museum
- St. Primiano bishop blessing and donors, Ancona, Diocesan Museum
- Enthroned Madonna nursing the Child, with customer, Ancona, Diocesan Museum
- St. James of Galicia, Ancona, Diocesan Museum

== Bibliography ==
- Pietro Zampetti, Pittura nelle Marche (Painting in the Marches), Ist vol., Nardini Editore, Florence 1988
- Andrea De Marchi e Matteo Mazzalupi, Pittori ad Ancona nel Quattrocento (Painters in Ancona in the Fifteenth Century), Federico Motta Editore, Milan 2008
- Andrea De Marchi, Pittori a Camerino nel Quattrocento (Painters in Camerino in the Fifteenth Century). Federico Motta Editore, Milan 2008, 2002
