= 2026 Tirreno–Adriatico =

Italian cycling race

2026 UCI World Tour, race 7 of 36

Race details
- Dates: 9–15 March 2026
- Stages: 7
- Distance: 1,165.5 km (724.2 mi)
- Winning time: 28h 02' 14"

Results
| Jersey awarded to the overall winner | Winner | Isaac del Toro (MEX) | (UAE Team Emirates XRG) |
| | Second | Matteo Jorgenson (USA) | (Visma–Lease a Bike) |
| | Third | Giulio Pellizzari (ITA) | (Red Bull–Bora–Hansgrohe) |
| Jersey awarded to the points classification winner | Points | Isaac del Toro (MEX) | (UAE Team Emirates XRG) |
| Jersey awarded to the mountains classification winner | Mountains | Diego Pablo Sevilla (ESP) | (Team Polti VisitMalta) |
| Jersey awarded to the young rider classification winner | Young rider | Isaac del Toro (MEX) | (UAE Team Emirates XRG) |
| | Team | (Germany) Red Bull–Bora–Hansgrohe | |

The 2026 Tirreno–Adriatico was a road cycling stage race that took place between 9 and 15 March in Italy. It was the 61st edition of the Tirreno–Adriatico and the seventh race of the 2026 UCI World Tour.

== Teams ==
All 18 UCI WorldTeams and six UCI ProTeams made up the 24 teams that participated in the race.

UCI WorldTeams

- Alpecin–Premier Tech
- Decathlon CMA CGM
- EF Education–EasyPost
- Groupama–FDJ United
- INEOS Grenadiers
- Lidl–Trek
- Lotto–Intermarché
- Movistar Team
- NSN Cycling Team
- Red Bull–Bora–Hansgrohe
- Soudal–Quick-Step
- Team Bahrain Victorious
- Team Jayco–AlUla
- Team Picnic–PostNL
- Visma–Lease a Bike
- UAE Team Emirates XRG
- Uno-X Mobility
- XDS Astana Team

UCI ProTeams

- Bardiani–CSF 7 Saber
- Caja Rural–Seguros RGA
- Pinarello–Q36.5 Pro Cycling Team
- Solution Tech NIPPO Rali
- Team Polti VisitMalta
- Tudor Pro Cycling Team

== Route ==
Stage characteristics and winners
| Stage | Date | Course | Distance | Type | Stage winner |
|---|---|---|---|---|---|
| 1 | 9 March | Lido di Camaiore to Lido di Camaiore | 11.5 km (7.1 mi) | Individual time trial | Filippo Ganna (ITA) |
| 2 | 10 March | Camaiore to San Gimignano | 206 km (128 mi) | Hilly stage | Mathieu van der Poel (NED) |
| 3 | 11 March | Cortona to Magliano de' Marsi | 221 km (137 mi) | Flat stage | Tobias Lund Andresen (DEN) |
| 4 | 12 March | Tagliacozzo to Martinsicuro | 213 km (132 mi) | Intermediate stage | Mathieu van der Poel (NED) |
| 5 | 13 March | Marotta-Mondolfo to Mombaroccio | 184 km (114 mi) | Mountain stage | Michael Valgren (DEN) |
| 6 | 14 March | San Severino Marche to Camerino | 188 km (117 mi) | Mountain stage | Isaac del Toro (MEX) |
| 7 | 15 March | Civitanova Marche to San Benedetto del Tronto | 142 km (88 mi) | Flat stage | Jonathan Milan (ITA) |
| Total | | | 1,165.5 km (724.2 mi) | | |

== Stages ==
=== Stage 1 ===
9 March 2026 — Lido di Camaiore to Lido di Camaiore, 11.5 km (7.1 mi) (ITT)

Stage 1 Result (1–10)
| Rank | Rider | Team | Time |
|---|---|---|---|
| 1 | Filippo Ganna (ITA) | INEOS Grenadiers | 12' 08" |
| 2 | Thymen Arensman (NED) | INEOS Grenadiers | + 22" |
| 3 | Max Walscheid (GER) | Lidl–Trek | + 26" |
| 4 | Magnus Sheffield (USA) | INEOS Grenadiers | + 26" |
| 5 | Jonathan Milan (ITA) | Lidl–Trek | + 29" |
| 6 | Alan Hatherly (RSA) | Team Jayco–AlUla | + 30" |
| 7 | Primož Roglič (SLO) | Red Bull–Bora–Hansgrohe | + 30" |
| 8 | Ethan Hayter (GBR) | Soudal–Quick-Step | + 32" |
| 9 | Antonio Tiberi (ITA) | Team Bahrain Victorious | + 33" |
| 10 | Isaac del Toro (MEX) | UAE Team Emirates XRG | + 36" |

General classification after Stage 1 (1–10)
| Rank | Rider | Team | Time |
|---|---|---|---|
| 1 | Filippo Ganna (ITA) | INEOS Grenadiers | 12' 08" |
| 2 | Thymen Arensman (NED) | INEOS Grenadiers | + 22" |
| 3 | Max Walscheid (GER) | Lidl–Trek | + 26" |
| 4 | Magnus Sheffield (USA) | INEOS Grenadiers | + 26" |
| 5 | Jonathan Milan (ITA) | Lidl–Trek | + 29" |
| 6 | Alan Hatherly (RSA) | Team Jayco–AlUla | + 30" |
| 7 | Primož Roglič (SLO) | Red Bull–Bora–Hansgrohe | + 30" |
| 8 | Ethan Hayter (GBR) | Soudal–Quick-Step | + 32" |
| 9 | Antonio Tiberi (ITA) | Team Bahrain Victorious | + 33" |
| 10 | Isaac del Toro (MEX) | UAE Team Emirates XRG | + 36" |

=== Stage 2 ===
10 March 2026 – Camaiore to San Gimignano, 206 km (128 mi)

Stage 2 Result (1–10)
| Rank | Rider | Team | Time |
|---|---|---|---|
| 1 | Mathieu van der Poel (NED) | Alpecin–Premier Tech | 4h 53' 23" |
| 2 | Isaac del Toro (MEX) | UAE Team Emirates XRG | + 0" |
| 3 | Giulio Pellizzari (ITA) | Red Bull–Bora–Hansgrohe | + 0" |
| 4 | Tobias Halland Johannessen (NOR) | Uno-X Mobility | + 15" |
| 5 | Andrea Vendrame (ITA) | Team Jayco–AlUla | + 17" |
| 6 | Alessandro Pinarello (ITA) | NSN Cycling Team | + 17" |
| 7 | Giulio Ciccone (ITA) | Lidl–Trek | + 17" |
| 8 | Andreas Kron (DEN) | Uno-X Mobility | + 17" |
| 9 | Clément Champoussin (FRA) | XDS Astana Team | + 17" |
| 10 | Paul Lapeira (FRA) | Decathlon CMA CGM | + 17" |

General classification after Stage 2 (1–10)
| Rank | Rider | Team | Time |
|---|---|---|---|
| 1 | Isaac del Toro (MEX) | UAE Team Emirates XRG | 5h 06' 01" |
| 2 | Giulio Pellizzari (ITA) | Red Bull–Bora–Hansgrohe | + 3" |
| 3 | Magnus Sheffield (USA) | INEOS Grenadiers | + 13" |
| 4 | Alan Hatherly (RSA) | Team Jayco–AlUla | + 17" |
| 5 | Primož Roglič (SLO) | Red Bull–Bora–Hansgrohe | + 18" |
| 6 | Antonio Tiberi (ITA) | Team Bahrain Victorious | + 20" |
| 7 | Matteo Jorgenson (USA) | Visma–Lease a Bike | + 31" |
| 8 | Filippo Ganna (ITA) | INEOS Grenadiers | + 34" |
| 9 | Javier Romo (ESP) | Movistar Team | + 34" |
| 10 | Ben Healy (IRL) | EF Education–EasyPost | + 36" |

=== Stage 3 ===
11 March 2026 – Cortona to Magliano de' Marsi, 221 km (137 mi)

Stage 3 Result (1–10)
| Rank | Rider | Team | Time |
|---|---|---|---|
| 1 | Tobias Lund Andresen (DEN) | Decathlon CMA CGM | 5h 29' 22" |
| 2 | Arnaud De Lie (BEL) | Lotto–Intermarché | + 0" |
| 3 | Jasper Philipsen (BEL) | Alpecin–Premier Tech | + 0" |
| 4 | Paul Magnier (FRA) | Soudal–Quick-Step | + 0" |
| 5 | Iván García Cortina (ESP) | Movistar Team | + 0" |
| 6 | Sam Welsford (AUS) | INEOS Grenadiers | + 0" |
| 7 | Jonathan Milan (ITA) | Lidl–Trek | + 0" |
| 8 | Oded Kogut (ISR) | NSN Cycling Team | + 0" |
| 9 | Madis Mihkels (EST) | EF Education–EasyPost | + 0" |
| 10 | Pavel Bittner (CZE) | Team Picnic–PostNL | + 0" |

General classification after Stage 3 (1–10)
| Rank | Rider | Team | Time |
|---|---|---|---|
| 1 | Isaac del Toro (MEX) | UAE Team Emirates XRG | 10h 35' 22" |
| 2 | Giulio Pellizzari (ITA) | Red Bull–Bora–Hansgrohe | + 4" |
| 3 | Magnus Sheffield (USA) | INEOS Grenadiers | + 14" |
| 4 | Alan Hatherly (RSA) | Team Jayco–AlUla | + 18" |
| 5 | Primož Roglič (SLO) | Red Bull–Bora–Hansgrohe | + 19" |
| 6 | Antonio Tiberi (ITA) | Team Bahrain Victorious | + 21" |
| 7 | Matteo Jorgenson (USA) | Visma–Lease a Bike | + 32" |
| 8 | Javier Romo (ESP) | Movistar Team | + 35" |
| 9 | Ben Healy (IRL) | EF Education–EasyPost | + 37" |
| 10 | Santiago Buitrago (COL) | Team Bahrain Victorious | + 38" |

=== Stage 4 ===
12 March 2026 – Tagliacozzo to Martinsicuro, 213 km (132 mi)

Stage 4 Result (1–10)
| Rank | Rider | Team | Time |
|---|---|---|---|
| 1 | Mathieu van der Poel (NED) | Alpecin–Premier Tech | 4h 51' 40" |
| 2 | Giulio Pellizzari (ITA) | Red Bull–Bora–Hansgrohe | + 0" |
| 3 | Tobias Halland Johannessen (NOR) | Uno-X Mobility | + 0" |
| 4 | Clément Champoussin (FRA) | XDS Astana Team | + 0" |
| 5 | Wout van Aert (BEL) | Visma–Lease a Bike | + 0" |
| 6 | Ben Healy (IRL) | EF Education–EasyPost | + 0" |
| 7 | Andrea Vendrame (ITA) | Team Jayco–AlUla | + 0" |
| 8 | Alessandro Pinarello (ITA) | NSN Cycling Team | + 0" |
| 9 | Filippo Ganna (ITA) | INEOS Grenadiers | + 0" |
| 10 | Isaac del Toro (MEX) | UAE Team Emirates XRG | + 0" |

General classification after Stage 4 (1–10)
| Rank | Rider | Team | Time |
|---|---|---|---|
| 1 | Giulio Pellizzari (ITA) | Red Bull–Bora–Hansgrohe | 15h 27' 00" |
| 2 | Isaac del Toro (MEX) | UAE Team Emirates XRG | + 2" |
| 3 | Primož Roglič (SLO) | Red Bull–Bora–Hansgrohe | + 21" |
| 4 | Matteo Jorgenson (USA) | Visma–Lease a Bike | + 34" |
| 5 | Ben Healy (IRL) | EF Education–EasyPost | + 39" |
| 6 | Andrea Vendrame (ITA) | Team Jayco–AlUla | + 42" |
| 7 | Magnus Sheffield (USA) | INEOS Grenadiers | + 42" |
| 8 | Giulio Ciccone (ITA) | Lidl–Trek | + 44" |
| 9 | Alan Hatherly (RSA) | Team Jayco–AlUla | + 46" |
| 10 | Antonio Tiberi (ITA) | Team Bahrain Victorious | + 49" |

=== Stage 5 ===
13 March 2026 – Marotta-Mondolfo to Mombaroccio, 184 km (114 mi)

Stage 5 Result (1–10)
| Rank | Rider | Team | Time |
|---|---|---|---|
| 1 | Michael Valgren (DEN) | EF Education–EasyPost | 4h 43' 33" |
| 2 | Isaac del Toro (MEX) | UAE Team Emirates XRG | + 11" |
| 3 | Matteo Jorgenson (USA) | Visma–Lease a Bike | + 11" |
| 4 | Tobias Halland Johannessen (NOR) | Uno-X Mobility | + 24" |
| 5 | Giulio Ciccone (ITA) | Lidl–Trek | + 28" |
| 6 | Giulio Pellizzari (ITA) | Red Bull–Bora–Hansgrohe | + 30" |
| 7 | Primož Roglič (SLO) | Red Bull–Bora–Hansgrohe | + 30" |
| 8 | Alessandro Pinarello (ITA) | NSN Cycling Team | + 40" |
| 9 | Michael Storer (AUS) | Tudor Pro Cycling Team | + 41" |
| 10 | Santiago Buitrago (COL) | Team Bahrain Victorious | + 41" |

General classification after Stage 5 (1–10)
| Rank | Rider | Team | Time |
|---|---|---|---|
| 1 | Isaac del Toro (MEX) | UAE Team Emirates XRG | 20h 10' 40" |
| 2 | Giulio Pellizzari (ITA) | Red Bull–Bora–Hansgrohe | + 23" |
| 3 | Matteo Jorgenson (USA) | Visma–Lease a Bike | + 34" |
| 4 | Primož Roglič (SLO) | Red Bull–Bora–Hansgrohe | + 44" |
| 5 | Giulio Ciccone (ITA) | Lidl–Trek | + 1' 05" |
| 6 | Tobias Halland Johannessen (NOR) | Uno-X Mobility | + 1' 08" |
| 7 | Alessandro Pinarello (ITA) | NSN Cycling Team | + 1' 24" |
| 8 | Ben Healy (IRL) | EF Education–EasyPost | + 1' 24" |
| 9 | Magnus Sheffield (USA) | INEOS Grenadiers | + 1' 27" |
| 10 | Santiago Buitrago (COL) | Team Bahrain Victorious | + 1' 28" |

=== Stage 6 ===
14 March 2026 – San Severino Marche to Camerino, 188 km (117 mi)

Stage 6 Result (1–10)
| Rank | Rider | Team | Time |
|---|---|---|---|
| 1 | Isaac del Toro (MEX) | UAE Team Emirates XRG | 4h 46' 50" |
| 2 | Tobias Halland Johannessen (NOR) | Uno-X Mobility | + 3" |
| 3 | Matteo Jorgenson (USA) | Visma–Lease a Bike | + 3" |
| 4 | Giulio Pellizzari (ITA) | Red Bull–Bora–Hansgrohe | + 9" |
| 5 | Giulio Ciccone (ITA) | Lidl–Trek | + 11" |
| 6 | Santiago Buitrago (COL) | Team Bahrain Victorious | + 11" |
| 7 | Ben Healy (IRL) | EF Education–EasyPost | + 21" |
| 8 | Magnus Sheffield (USA) | INEOS Grenadiers | + 25" |
| 9 | Primož Roglič (SLO) | Red Bull–Bora–Hansgrohe | + 27" |
| 10 | Andrea Vendrame (ITA) | Team Jayco–AlUla | + 32" |

General classification after Stage 6 (1–10)
| Rank | Rider | Team | Time |
|---|---|---|---|
| 1 | Isaac del Toro (MEX) | UAE Team Emirates XRG | 24h 57' 20" |
| 2 | Giulio Pellizzari (ITA) | Red Bull–Bora–Hansgrohe | + 42" |
| 3 | Matteo Jorgenson (USA) | Visma–Lease a Bike | + 43" |
| 4 | Tobias Halland Johannessen (NOR) | Uno-X Mobility | + 1' 15" |
| 5 | Primož Roglič (SLO) | Red Bull–Bora–Hansgrohe | + 1' 21" |
| 6 | Giulio Ciccone (ITA) | Lidl–Trek | + 1' 26" |
| 7 | Santiago Buitrago (COL) | Team Bahrain Victorious | + 1' 49" |
| 8 | Ben Healy (IRL) | EF Education–EasyPost | + 1' 55" |
| 9 | Magnus Sheffield (USA) | INEOS Grenadiers | + 2' 02" |
| 10 | Alessandro Pinarello (ITA) | NSN Cycling Team | + 2' 06" |

=== Stage 7 ===
15 March 2026 – Civitanova Marche to San Benedetto del Tronto, 142 km (88 mi)

Stage 7 Result (1–10)
| Rank | Rider | Team | Time |
|---|---|---|---|
| 1 | Jonathan Milan (ITA) | Lidl–Trek | 3h 04' 54" |
| 2 | Sam Welsford (AUS) | INEOS Grenadiers | + 0" |
| 3 | Laurenz Rex (BEL) | Soudal–Quick-Step | + 0" |
| 4 | Oded Kogut (ISR) | NSN Cycling Team | + 0" |
| 5 | Pavel Bittner (CZE) | Team Picnic–PostNL | + 0" |
| 6 | Tobias Lund Andresen (DEN) | Decathlon CMA CGM | + 0" |
| 7 | Anders Foldager (DEN) | Team Jayco–AlUla | + 0" |
| 8 | Arnaud De Lie (BEL) | Lotto–Intermarché | + 0" |
| 9 | Giovanni Lonardi (ITA) | Team Polti VisitMalta | + 0" |
| 10 | Iván García Cortina (ESP) | Movistar Team | + 0" |

General classification after Stage 7 (1–10)
| Rank | Rider | Team | Time |
|---|---|---|---|
| 1 | Isaac del Toro (MEX) | UAE Team Emirates XRG | 28h 02' 14" |
| 2 | Matteo Jorgenson (USA) | Visma–Lease a Bike | + 40" |
| 3 | Giulio Pellizzari (ITA) | Red Bull–Bora–Hansgrohe | + 42" |
| 4 | Tobias Halland Johannessen (NOR) | Uno-X Mobility | + 1' 14" |
| 5 | Primož Roglič (SLO) | Red Bull–Bora–Hansgrohe | + 1' 21" |
| 6 | Giulio Ciccone (ITA) | Lidl–Trek | + 1' 26" |
| 7 | Santiago Buitrago (COL) | Team Bahrain Victorious | + 1' 49" |
| 8 | Ben Healy (IRL) | EF Education–EasyPost | + 1' 55" |
| 9 | Magnus Sheffield (USA) | INEOS Grenadiers | + 2' 02" |
| 10 | Alessandro Pinarello (ITA) | NSN Cycling Team | + 2' 06" |

== Classification leadership table ==
Classification leadership by stage
| Stage | Winner | General classification | Points classification | Mountains classification | Young rider classification | Team classification |
|---|---|---|---|---|---|---|
| 1 | Filippo Ganna | Filippo Ganna | Filippo Ganna | Not awarded | Magnus Sheffield | INEOS Grenadiers |
| 2 | Mathieu van der Poel | Isaac del Toro | Filippo Ganna | Mathieu van der Poel | Isaac del Toro | Red Bull–Bora–Hansgrohe |
| 3 | Tobias Lund Andresen | Isaac del Toro | Isaac del Toro | Diego Pablo Sevilla | Isaac del Toro | Red Bull–Bora–Hansgrohe |
| 4 | Mathieu van der Poel | Giulio Pellizzari | Mathieu van der Poel | Diego Pablo Sevilla | Giulio Pellizzari | Red Bull–Bora–Hansgrohe |
| 5 | Michael Valgren | Isaac del Toro | Mathieu van der Poel | Diego Pablo Sevilla | Isaac del Toro | EF Education–EasyPost |
| 6 | Isaac del Toro | Isaac del Toro | Isaac del Toro | Diego Pablo Sevilla | Isaac del Toro | Red Bull–Bora–Hansgrohe |
| 7 | Jonathan Milan | Isaac del Toro | Isaac del Toro | Diego Pablo Sevilla | Isaac del Toro | Red Bull–Bora–Hansgrohe |
| Final | | Isaac del Toro | Isaac del Toro | Diego Pablo Sevilla | Isaac del Toro | Red Bull–Bora–Hansgrohe |

== Classification standings ==
Legend
| Denotes the winner of the general classification | Denotes the winner of the mountains classification |
| Denotes the winner of the points classification | Denotes the winner of the young rider classification |

=== General classification ===
Final general classification (1–10)
| Rank | Rider | Team | Time |
|---|---|---|---|
| 1 | Isaac del Toro (MEX) | UAE Team Emirates XRG | 28h 02' 14" |
| 2 | Matteo Jorgenson (USA) | Visma–Lease a Bike | + 40" |
| 3 | Giulio Pellizzari (ITA) | Red Bull–Bora–Hansgrohe | + 42" |
| 4 | Tobias Halland Johannessen (NOR) | Uno-X Mobility | + 1' 14" |
| 5 | Primož Roglič (SLO) | Red Bull–Bora–Hansgrohe | + 1' 21" |
| 6 | Giulio Ciccone (ITA) | Lidl–Trek | + 1' 26" |
| 7 | Santiago Buitrago (COL) | Team Bahrain Victorious | + 1' 49" |
| 8 | Ben Healy (IRL) | EF Education–EasyPost | + 1' 55" |
| 9 | Magnus Sheffield (USA) | INEOS Grenadiers | + 2' 02" |
| 10 | Alessandro Pinarello (ITA) | NSN Cycling Team | + 2' 06" |

=== Points classification ===
Final points classification (1–10)
| Rank | Rider | Team | Points |
|---|---|---|---|
| 1 | Isaac del Toro (MEX) | UAE Team Emirates XRG | 36 |
| 2 | Tobias Halland Johannessen (NOR) | Uno-X Mobility | 34 |
| 3 | Giulio Pellizzari (ITA) | Red Bull–Bora–Hansgrohe | 30 |
| 4 | Mathieu van der Poel (NED) | Alpecin–Premier Tech | 24 |
| 5 | Matteo Jorgenson (USA) | Visma–Lease a Bike | 21 |
| 6 | Jonathan Milan (ITA) | Lidl–Trek | 19 |
| 7 | Filippo Ganna (ITA) | INEOS Grenadiers | 17 |
| 8 | Tobias Lund Andresen (DEN) | Decathlon CMA CGM | 17 |
| 9 | Giulio Ciccone (ITA) | Lidl–Trek | 16 |
| 10 | Sam Welsford (AUS) | INEOS Grenadiers | 15 |

=== Mountains classification ===
Final mountains classification (1–10)
| Rank | Rider | Team | Points |
|---|---|---|---|
| 1 | Diego Pablo Sevilla (ESP) | Team Polti VisitMalta | 33 |
| 2 | Joan Bou (ESP) | Caja Rural–Seguros RGA | 21 |
| 3 | Isaac del Toro (MEX) | UAE Team Emirates XRG | 18 |
| 4 | Timo Kielich (BEL) | Visma–Lease a Bike | 17 |
| 5 | Michael Valgren (DEN) | EF Education–EasyPost | 15 |
| 6 | Jack Haig (AUS) | INEOS Grenadiers | 14 |
| 7 | Mathieu van der Poel (NED) | Alpecin–Premier Tech | 13 |
| 8 | Gregor Mühlberger (AUT) | Decathlon CMA CGM | 11 |
| 9 | Filippo Ganna (ITA) | INEOS Grenadiers | 11 |
| 10 | Clément Braz Afonso (FRA) | Groupama–FDJ United | 10 |

=== Young rider classification ===
Final young rider classification (1–10)
| Rank | Rider | Team | Time |
|---|---|---|---|
| 1 | Isaac del Toro (MEX) | UAE Team Emirates XRG | 28h 02' 14" |
| 2 | Giulio Pellizzari (ITA) | Red Bull–Bora–Hansgrohe | + 42" |
| 3 | Magnus Sheffield (USA) | INEOS Grenadiers | + 2' 02" |
| 4 | Alessandro Pinarello (ITA) | NSN Cycling Team | + 2' 06" |
| 5 | Guillermo Thomas Silva (URU) | XDS Astana Team | + 13' 55" |
| 6 | Brieuc Rolland (FRA) | Groupama–FDJ United | + 14' 58" |
| 7 | Ludovico Crescioli (ITA) | Team Polti VisitMalta | + 22' 07" |
| 8 | Edoardo Zambanini (ITA) | Team Bahrain Victorious | + 22' 23" |
| 9 | Jan Christen (SUI) | UAE Team Emirates XRG | + 24' 04" |
| 10 | Antonio Tiberi (ITA) | Team Bahrain Victorious | + 32' 33" |

=== Team classification ===
Final team classification (1–10)
| Rank | Team | Time |
|---|---|---|
| 1 | (Germany) Red Bull–Bora–Hansgrohe | 84h 19' 06" |
| 2 | (United States) EF Education–EasyPost | + 8' 17" |
| 3 | (United Arab Emirates) UAE Team Emirates XRG | + 10' 22" |
| 4 | (France) Groupama–FDJ United | + 13' 43" |
| 5 | Team Bahrain Victorious | + 13' 47" |
| 6 | (United Kingdom) INEOS Grenadiers | + 14' 12" |
| 7 | (Australia) Team Jayco–AlUla | + 18' 07" |
| 8 | (Norway) Uno-X Mobility | + 33' 59" |
| 9 | (Spain) Movistar Team | + 35' 15" |
| 10 | (Netherlands) Visma–Lease a Bike | + 41' 40" |
