= Peglio =

Peglio may refer to:

== Places ==
Italy

- Peglio, Lombardy, a comune in the Province of Como
- Peglio, Marche a comune in the Province of Pesaro e Urbino
