= Moretta (coffee) =

Italian coffee drink with alcohol

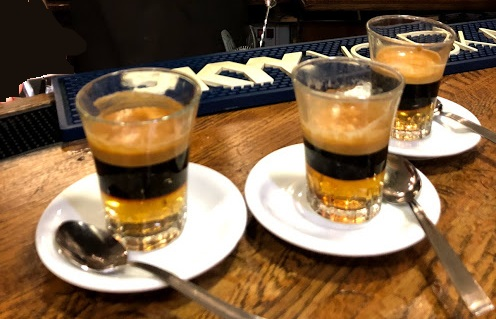
- Type: Hot
- Origin: Marche, Italy
- Introduced: Approx. 19th century
- Color: Dark brown

Moretta (complete name Moretta fanese) is a typical hot coffee from Fano, in the Province of Pesaro and Urbino, Italy, and is popular in the fishing areas near the coast. It is strong and sweet, and typically served after meals as a digestive or as a hot drink on cold afternoons.

== History ==
Sailors and fishermen from the port of Fano (PU) may have created the drink, as they used similar ingredients to warm and invigorate themselves in the workplace. In the past, the poor economised, so leftovers were gathered together as a liquor. Over time, these ingredients became the basis for moretta. In 2004, AIBES (Associazione Italiana Barman e Sostenitori) recognised moretta as an official cocktail.

== Preparation ==
The hot cocktail is a blend of anise, rum and brandy in roughly equal parts. The type of alcohol used can vary according to personal taste and individual recipes. For example, one variant uses cognac instead of brandy. The liquor is heated with steam, together with sugar and lemon or orange zest, and poured directly into the glass, if possible, in order to dissolve the sugar. Then, warm coffee, preferably espresso, is added slowly, so as not to mix with the liquor.

Moretta is usually served in small transparent glasses, allowing the drinker to see the expected three layers: froth, coffee, and liquor. The drinker may then stir it before drinking.
