= Sant'Ippolito =

- Comune
- Comune di Sant'Ippolito
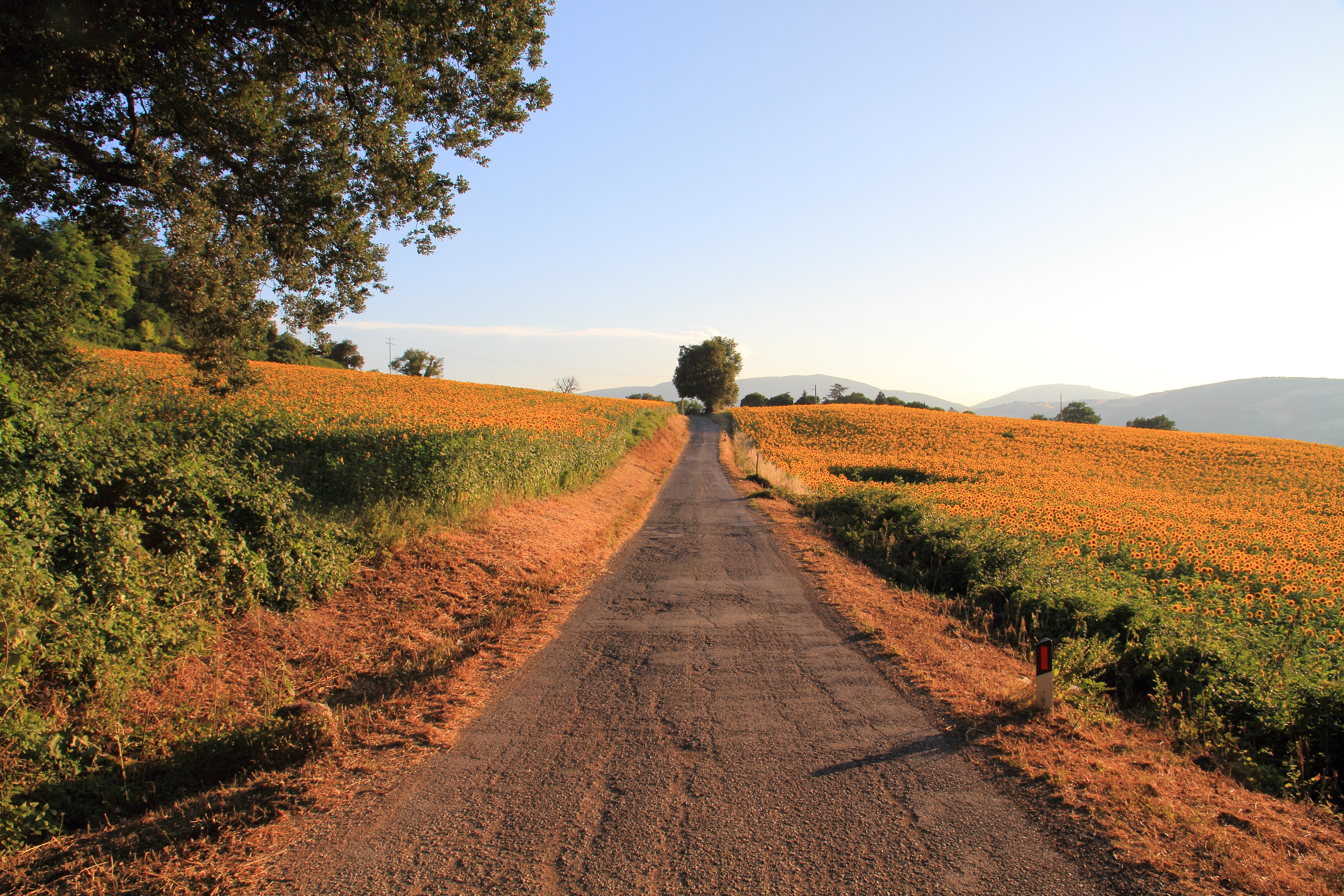
- Rural landscape in Sant'Ippolito

- Coat of arms

- Sant'Ippolito within the Province of Pesaro e Urbino

- Location within Italy Location within Marche
- Coordinates: 43°41′N 12°52′E
- Country: Italy
- Region: Marche
- Province: Pesaro e Urbino (PU)

Government
  - Mayor: Marco Marchetti

Area
  - Total: 19.88 km^{2} (7.68 sq mi)
- Elevation: 246 m (807 ft)

Population (31 October 2020)
  - Total: 1,477
  - Density: 74.30/km^{2} (192.4/sq mi)
- Demonym: Santippolitesi
- Time zone: UTC+1 (CET)
  - Summer (DST): UTC+2 (CEST)
- Postal code: 61040
- Dialing code: 0721

Sant'Ippolito is a comune (municipality) in the Province of Pesaro e Urbino in the Italian region Marche, located about 50 kilometres (31 mi) west of Ancona and about 25 kilometres (16 mi) south of Pesaro.

== Geography ==
Sant'Ippolito borders the following municipalities: Fossombrone, Fratte Rosa, Montefelcino, Orciano di Pesaro, Serrungarina, Terre Roveresche.
