= Petriano =

- Comune
- Comune di Petriano
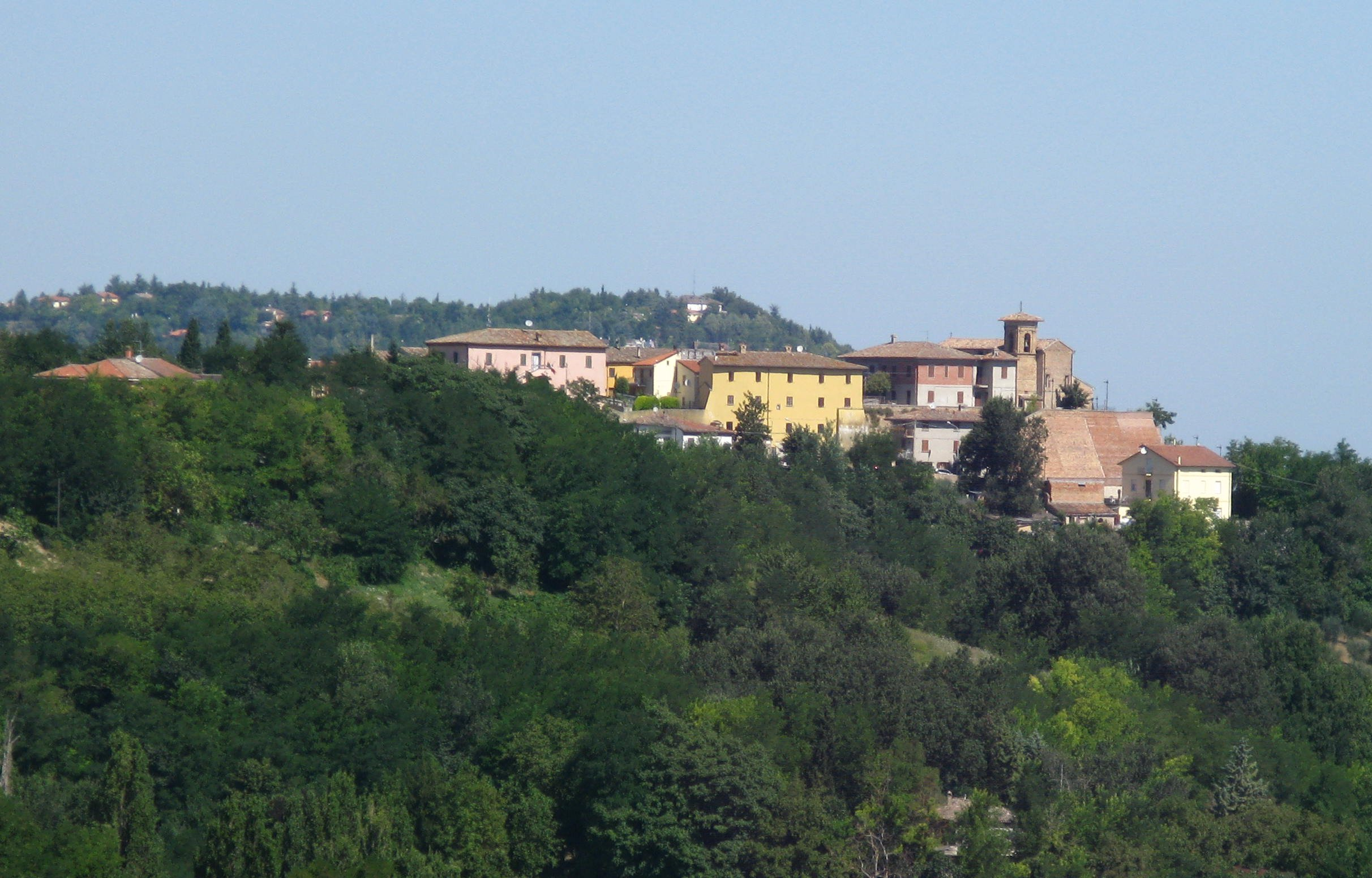
- View of Petriano

- Location within Italy Location within Marche
- Coordinates: 43°47′N 12°44′E
- Country: Italy
- Region: Marche
- Province: Province of Pesaro e Urbino (PU)

Area
  - Total: 11.3 km^{2} (4.4 sq mi)

Population (Dec. 2004)
  - Total: 2,659
  - Density: 235/km^{2} (609/sq mi)
- Time zone: UTC+1 (CET)
  - Summer (DST): UTC+2 (CEST)
- Postal code: 61020
- Dialing code: 0722

Petriano is a comune (municipality) in the Province of Pesaro e Urbino in the Italian region Marche, located about 70 kilometres (43 mi) northwest of Ancona and about 20 kilometres (12 mi) southwest of Pesaro. As of 31 December 2004, it had a population of 2,659 and an area of 11.3 square kilometres (4.4 mi^{2}).

Petriano borders the following municipalities: Colbordolo, Montefelcino, Urbino.

== Demographic evolution ==
Historical population

Year	Pop.	±%
1861	720	—
1871	845	+17.4%
1881	864	+2.2%
1901	1,016	+17.6%
1911	1,184	+16.5%

Year	Pop.	±%
1921	1,284	+8.4%
1931	1,533	+19.4%
1936	1,486	−3.1%
1951	1,609	+8.3%
1961	1,643	+2.1%

Year	Pop.	±%
1971	1,878	+14.3%
1981	2,142	+14.1%
1991	2,257	+5.4%
2001	2,457	+8.9%

Source: Data from ISTAT
