= Monte Catria =

Mountain in Italy

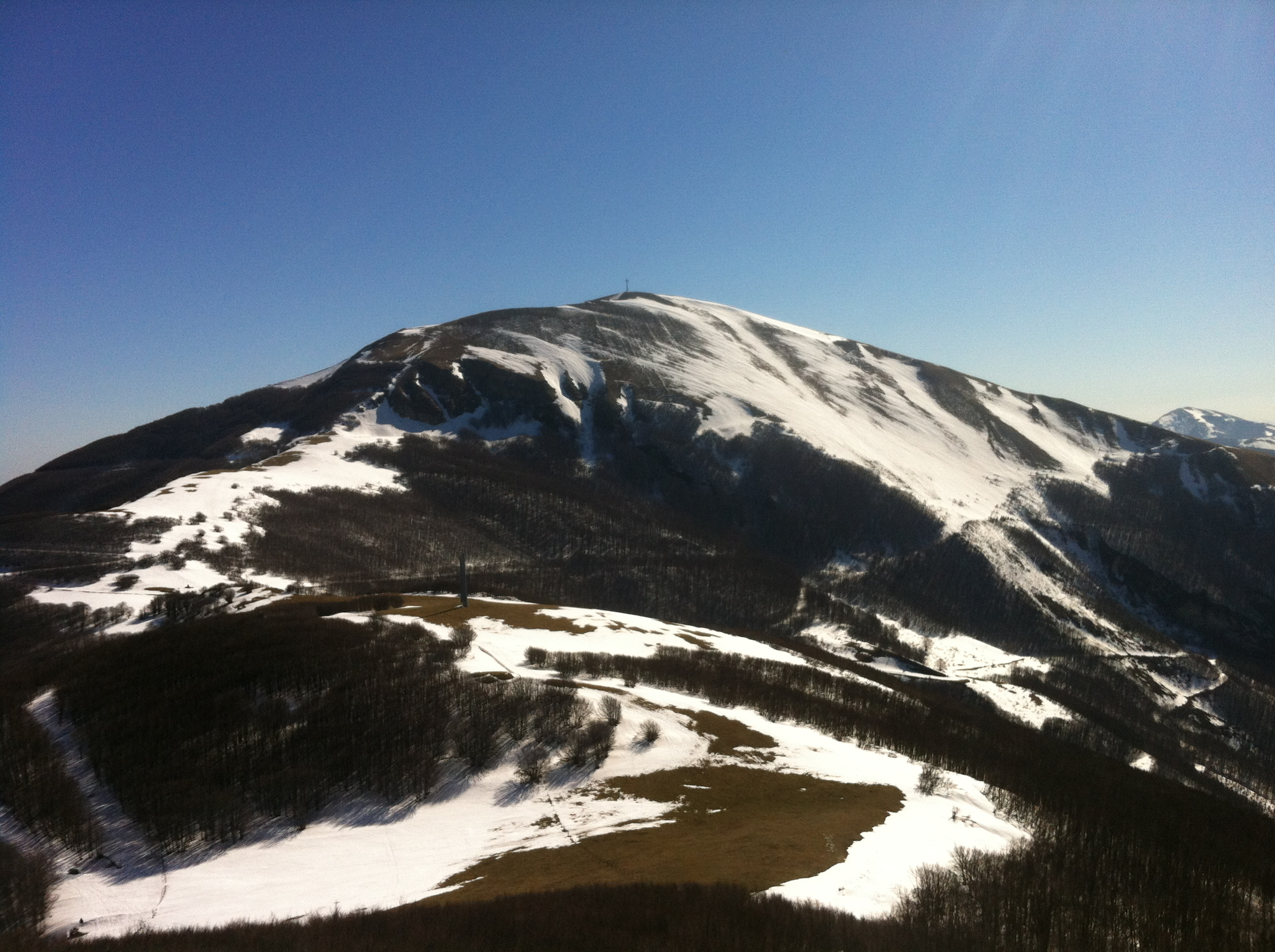
- Monte Catria (2012)

Highest point
- Elevation: 1,702 m (5,584 ft)
- Prominence: 1,066 m (3,497 ft)
- Listing: Ribu
- Coordinates: 43°27′42″N 12°42′16″E

Geography
- Location within Italy
- Location: Marche, Italy
- Parent range: Central Apennines

The Monte Catria is a mountain in the central Apennines, in the province of Pesaro e Urbino, Marche, central Italy. The highest peak is at 1,702 metres (5,584 ft) above sea level.

It is a massif of limestone rocks dating to some 200 million years ago.

Historically, it marked the boundary between the Exarchate of Ravenna and the Duchy of Spoleto

The source of the Cesano river is located nearby.
