= Isola del Piano =

- Comune
- Comune di Isola del Piano
- Location within Italy Location within Marche
- Coordinates: 43°44′16″N 12°47′04″E
- Country: Italy
- Region: Marche
- Province: Province of Pesaro e Urbino (PU)
- Frazioni: Castelgagliardo

Government
  - Mayor: Giuseppe Paolini

Area
  - Total: 23.1 km^{2} (8.9 sq mi)
- Elevation: 210 m (690 ft)

Population (31 August 2017)
  - Total: 591
  - Density: 25.6/km^{2} (66.3/sq mi)
- Demonym: Isolani
- Time zone: UTC+1 (CET)
  - Summer (DST): UTC+2 (CEST)
- Postal code: 61030
- Dialing code: 0721
- Patron saint: St. Christopher
- Website: Official website

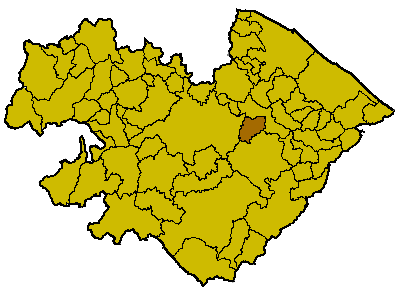

Isola del Piano is a comune (municipality) in the Province of Pesaro e Urbino in the Italian region Marche, located about 60 kilometres (37 mi) west of Ancona and about 20 kilometres (12 mi) southwest of Pesaro.

Isola del Piano borders the following municipalities: Fossombrone, Montefelcino, Urbino.
