= Peglio, Marche =

Peglio
- Comune
- Comune di Peglio
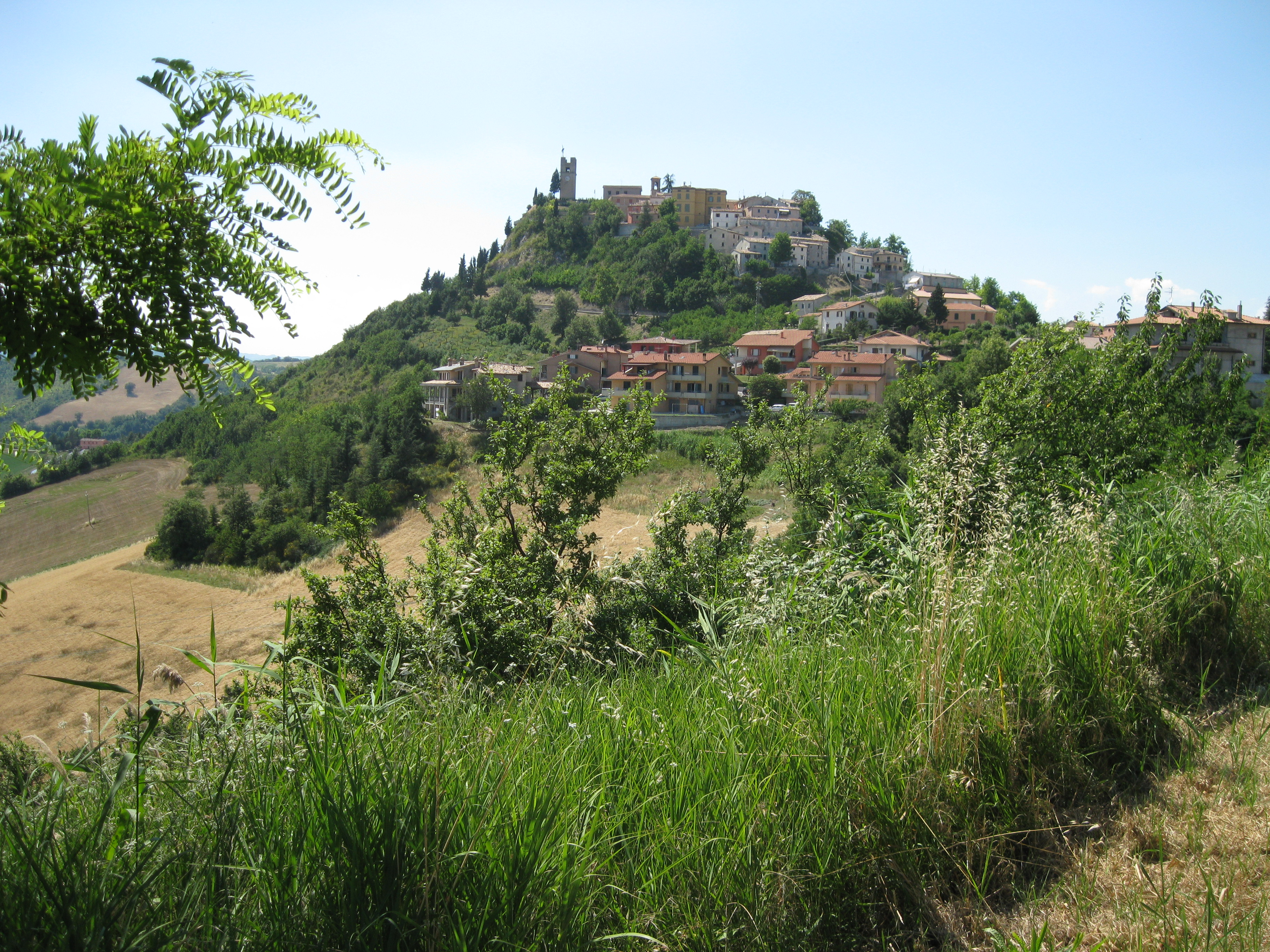
- View of Peglio

- Location within Italy Location within Marche
- Coordinates: 43°42′N 12°30′E
- Country: Italy
- Region: Marche
- Province: Pesaro and Urbino (PU)

Government
  - Mayor: Cristina Belpassi

Area
  - Total: 21.36 km^{2} (8.25 sq mi)
- Elevation: 650 m (2,130 ft)

Population (31 October 2020)
  - Total: 650
  - Density: 30/km^{2} (79/sq mi)
- Demonym: Pegliesi
- Time zone: UTC+1 (CET)
  - Summer (DST): UTC+2 (CEST)
- Postal code: 61049
- Dialing code: 0722
- Website: Official website

Peglio is a comune (municipality) in the Province of Pesaro and Urbino in the Italian region Marche, located about 80 kilometres (50 mi) west of Ancona and about 40 kilometres (25 mi) southwest of Pesaro.

Peglio borders the following municipalities: Lunano, Sant'Angelo in Vado, Sassocorvaro Auditore, Urbania, Urbino.
