= Borgo Pace =

- Comune
- Comune di Borgo Pace
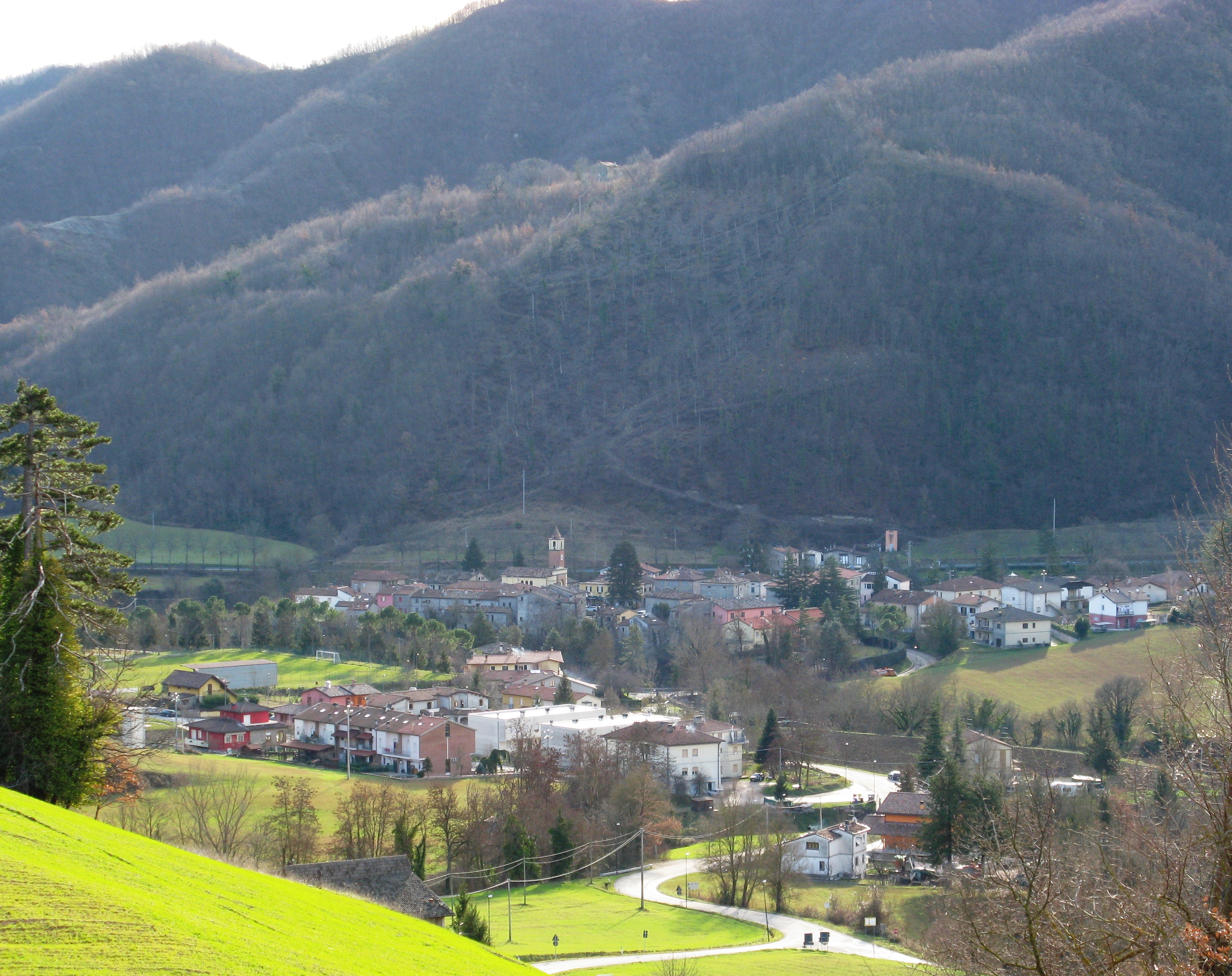
- View of Borgo Pace

- Coat of arms

- Location within Italy Location within Marche
- Coordinates: 43°39′N 12°18′E
- Country: Italy
- Region: Marche
- Province: Pesaro e Urbino (PU)
- Frazioni: Lamoli, Parchiule, Sompiano

Government
  - Mayor: Romina Pierantoni

Area
  - Total: 56.22 km^{2} (21.71 sq mi)
- Elevation: 469 m (1,539 ft)

Population (2020)
  - Total: 537
  - Density: 9.55/km^{2} (24.7/sq mi)
- Demonym: Borgopacesi
- Time zone: UTC+1 (CET)
  - Summer (DST): UTC+2 (CEST)
- Postal code: 61040
- Dialing code: 0722

Borgo Pace is a comune (municipality) in the Province of Pesaro e Urbino in the Italian region Marche, located about 100 kilometres (62 mi) west of Ancona and about 60 kilometres (37 mi) southwest of Pesaro.
