= Monte Cerignone =

- Comune
- Comune di Monte Cerignone
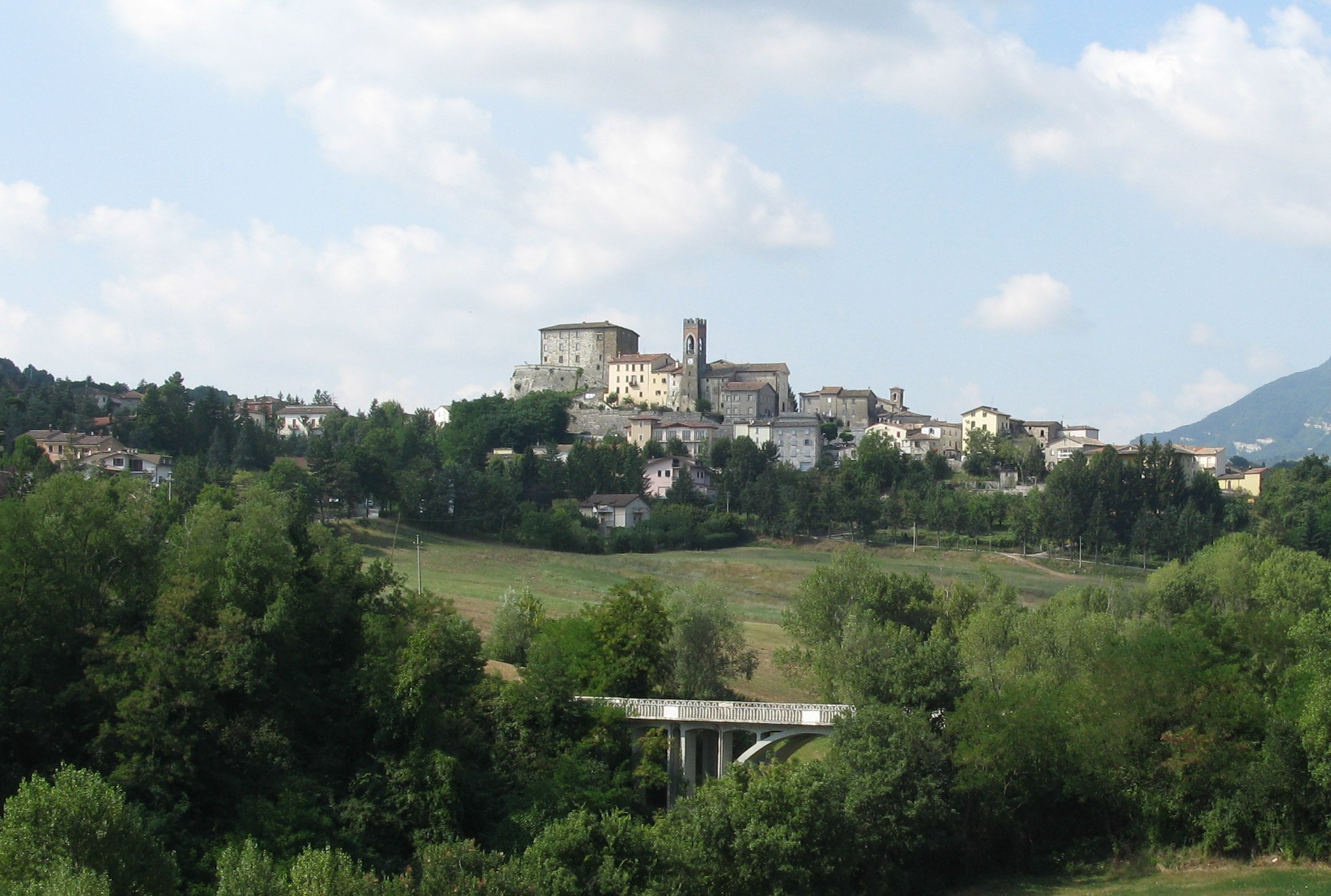
- View of Monte Cerignone

- Coat of arms

- Location within Italy Location within Marche
- Coordinates: 43°50′N 12°25′E
- Country: Italy
- Region: Marche
- Province: Pesaro e Urbino (PU)
- Frazioni: Valle di Teva

Government
  - Mayor: Carlo Chiarabini

Area
  - Total: 18.1 km^{2} (7.0 sq mi)
- Elevation: 528 m (1,732 ft)

Population (31 October 2020)
  - Total: 637
  - Density: 35.2/km^{2} (91.2/sq mi)
- Demonym: Cerignonesi
- Time zone: UTC+1 (CET)
  - Summer (DST): UTC+2 (CEST)
- Postal code: 61010
- Dialing code: 0541
- Patron saint: St. Blaise
- Saint day: February 3
- Website: Official website

Monte Cerignone is a comune (municipality) in the Province of Pesaro e Urbino in the Italian region Marche, located about 90 kilometres (56 mi) northwest of Ancona and about 40 kilometres (25 mi) west of Pesaro.

Monte Cerignone borders the following municipalities: Macerata Feltria, Mercatino Conca, Montecopiolo, Monte Grimano, Sassocorvaro Auditore, Tavoleto.

Sights include the Malatesta fortress, which was partly designed by Francesco di Giorgio Martini.

The town has the head office of the coffeeshop chain Caffè Pascucci.

== Twin towns ==
- Randazzo, Italy
