= Apecchio =

- Comune
- Comune di Apecchio
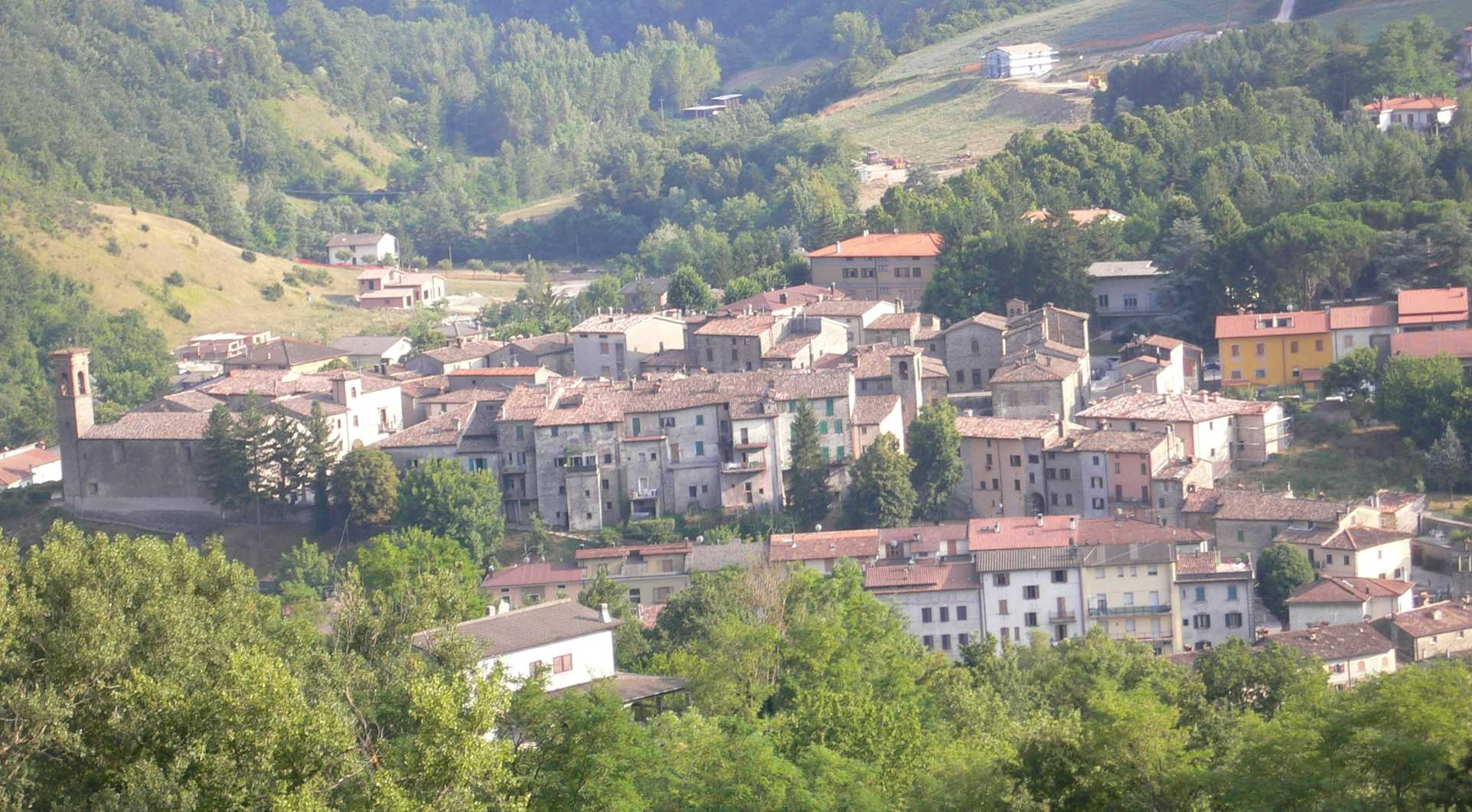
- View of Apecchio

- Location within Italy Location within Marche
- Coordinates: 43°34′N 12°25′E
- Country: Italy
- Region: Marche
- Province: Pesaro e Urbino (PU)
- Frazioni: Caselle, Salceto, Colombara, Osteria Nuova, Pian di Molino, San Martino, Serravalle di Carda, Valdara di Serravalle

Government
  - Mayor: Vittorio Nicolucci

Area
  - Total: 103.0 km^{2} (39.8 sq mi)

Population (2020)
  - Total: 1,768
  - Density: 17.17/km^{2} (44.46/sq mi)
- Demonym: Apecchiesi
- Time zone: UTC+1 (CET)
  - Summer (DST): UTC+2 (CEST)
- Postal code: 61042
- Dialing code: 0722
- Patron saint: St. Martin
- Saint day: 11 November
- Website: Official website

Apecchio is a comune (municipality) in the Province of Pesaro e Urbino in the Italian region Marche, about 90 kilometres (56 mi) west of Ancona and about 60 kilometres (37 mi) southwest of Pesaro.
