= Cartoceto =

- Comune
- Comune di Cartoceto
- Location within Italy Location within Marche
- Coordinates: 43°46′N 12°53′E
- Country: Italy
- Region: Marche
- Province: Pesaro e Urbino (PU)
- Frazioni: Lucrezia, Molinaccio, Pontemurello, Ripalta, Salomone, Sant'Anna

Government
  - Mayor: Enrico Rossi

Area
  - Total: 23.2 km^{2} (9.0 sq mi)
- Elevation: 235 m (771 ft)

Population (31 May 2017)
  - Total: 7,888
  - Density: 340/km^{2} (881/sq mi)
- Demonym: Cartocetani
- Time zone: UTC+1 (CET)
  - Summer (DST): UTC+2 (CEST)
- Postal code: 61030
- Dialing code: 0721
- Patron saint: St. Bernardino
- Saint day: 20 May
- Website: Official website

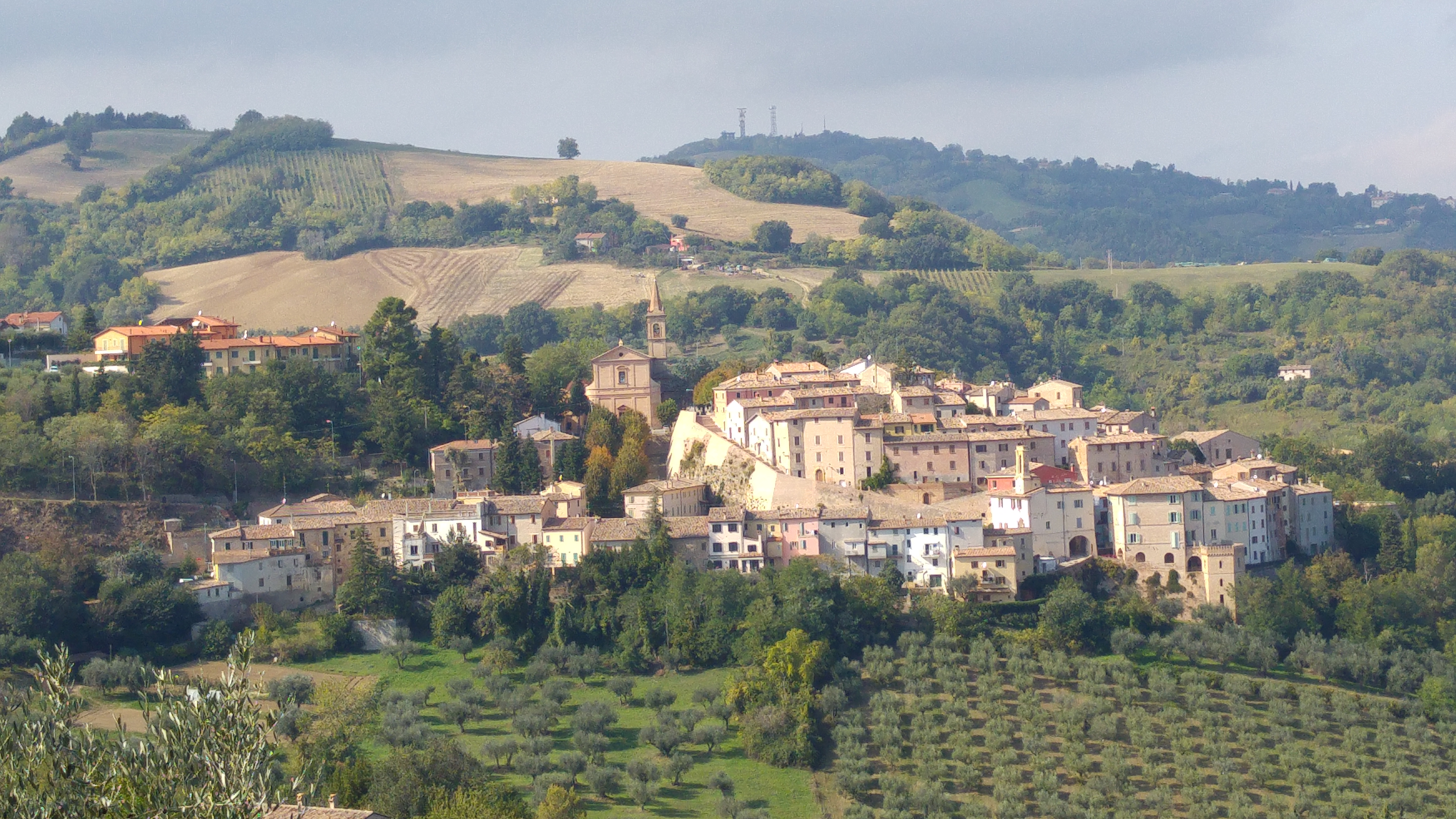
A view of Cartoceto from a nearby church

Cartoceto is a comune (municipality) in the Province of Pesaro e Urbino in the Italian region Marche, located about 50 kilometres (31 mi) northwest of Ancona and about 15 kilometres (9 mi) south of Pesaro.

== Twin towns ==
- Hügelsheim, Germany
