= Monte Grimano Terme =

- Comune
- Comune di Monte Grimano Terme
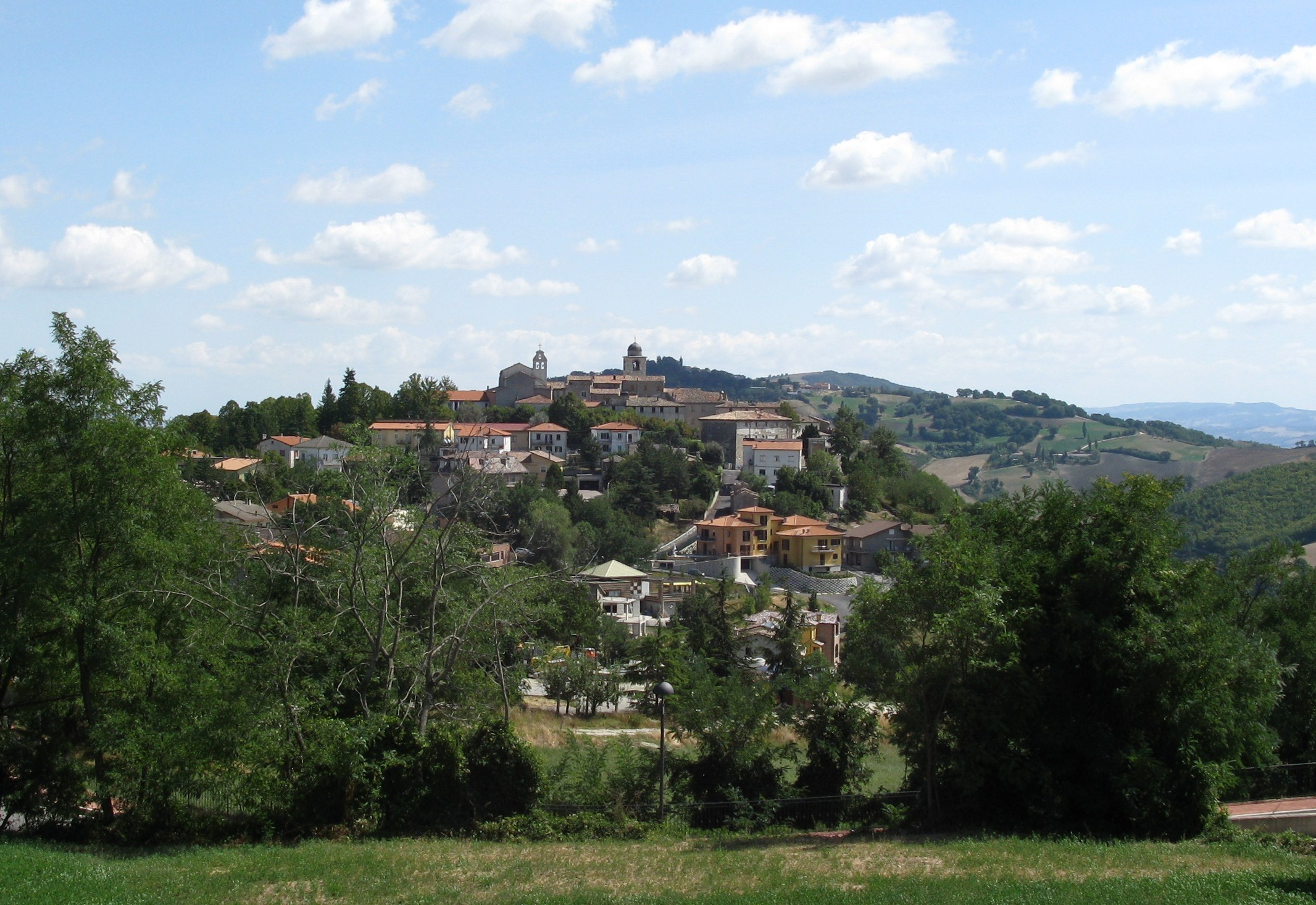
- View of Monte Grimano Terme

- Coat of arms

- Location within Italy Location within Marche
- Coordinates: 43°50′N 12°25′E
- Country: Italy
- Region: Marche
- Province: Pesaro e Urbino (PU)
- Frazioni: Montelicciano, Savignano Monte Tassi

Government
  - Mayor: Daniele D'Antonio

Area
  - Total: 24 km^{2} (9.3 sq mi)
- Elevation: 536 m (1,759 ft)

Population (28 February 2009)
  - Total: 1,256
  - Density: 52/km^{2} (140/sq mi)
- Demonym: Montegrimanesi
- Time zone: UTC+1 (CET)
  - Summer (DST): UTC+2 (CEST)
- Postal code: 61010
- Dialing code: 0541
- Patron saint: St. Sylvester
- Saint day: December 31

Monte Grimano Terme is a comune (municipality) in the Province of Pesaro e Urbino in the Italian region Marche, located about 90 kilometres (56 mi) northwest of Ancona and about 40 kilometres (25 mi) west of Pesaro. Until 2002, it was known as Monte Grimano.

Monte Grimaro Terme borders the following municipalities: Fiorentino, Macerata Feltria, Mercatino Conca, Monte Cerignone, Montecopiolo, Montegiardino, San Leo, Sassofeltrio. It is one of I Borghi più belli d'Italia ("The most beautiful villages of Italy").

== Sport ==
The 4th stage of 2024 Giro d'Italia Women passed through Monte Grimaro Terme on 10th of July.
