= Marotta (village) =

- Frazione
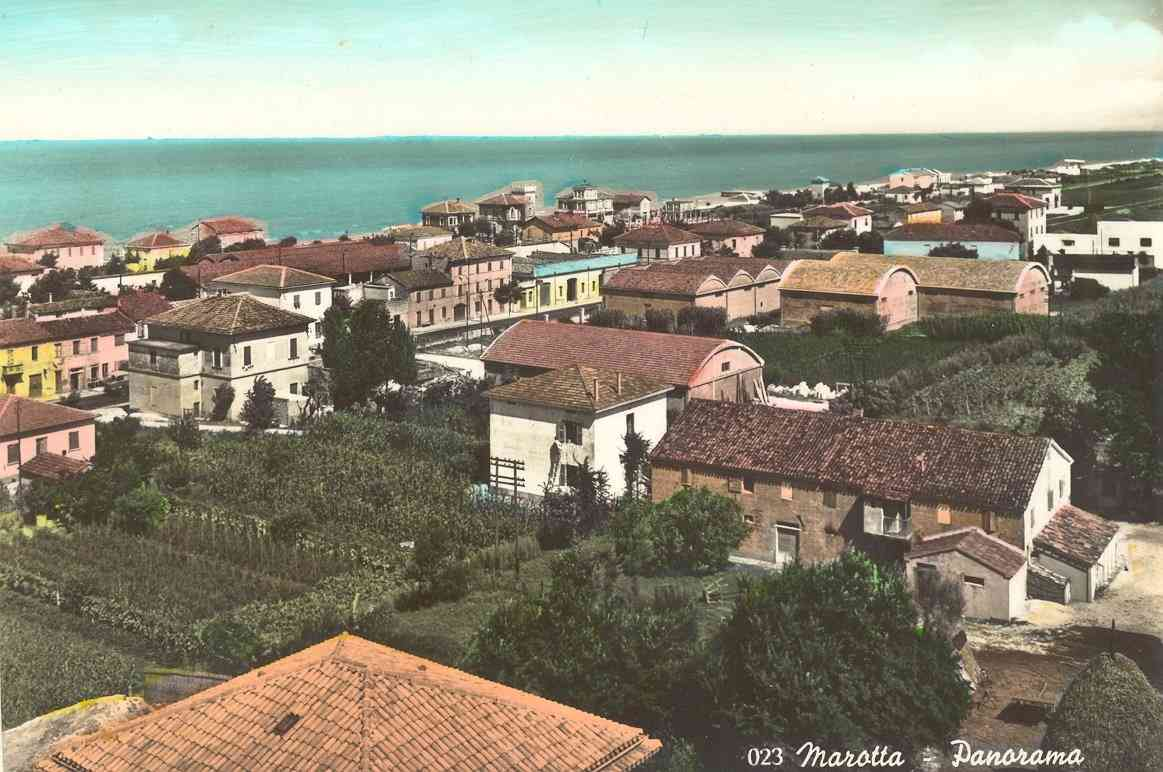
- Postcard of Marotta (1958)

- Location of Marotta in Italy
- Coordinates: 43°46′11″N 13°08′13″E
- Country: Italy
- Region: Marche
- Province: Pesaro e Urbino (PU)
- Comune: Mondolfo; San Costanzo
- Elevation: 4 m (13 ft)

Population (2001)
  - Total: 11,659
- Demonym: Marottesi
- Time zone: UTC+1 (CET)
  - Summer (DST): UTC+2 (CEST)
- Postal code: 61037, 61039
- Dialing code: (+39) 0721
- Website: Marotta info website

Marotta is an Italian village and hamlet (frazione) of the municipalities of Mondolfo and San Costanzo, in the Province of Pesaro and Urbino, Marche. In 2001 its population was 11,659.

== Geography ==
Located by the Adriatic Sea between the towns of Fano (14 km in north) and Senigallia (8 km in south).

Marotta is 29 km far from Pesaro, 49 from Ancona, 58 from Urbino and 64 from Rimini. It is a seaside resort who extends its coastline for about 5 km.

== History ==
The origin of the name refer to the Latin words Mala Rupta, or Mauri Rupta.

A process of reunification of the town, asking for the merging of Marotta di Fano in the part belonging to Mondolfo, began in the end of the 1950s. In 2010 a local committee proposed a referendum for reunification. It was accepted on 28 March 2013 with a decree of regional governor Gian Mario Spacca, and took place in March 2014.

== Transport ==
Crossed by the state highway "SS 16 Adriatica" Padua-Otranto, Marotta is also served by the A14 Motorway Bologna-Taranto at the exit "Marotta-Mondolfo". It counts a minor railway station, named Marotta-Mondolfo, on the Bologna-Ancona line.

== Sport ==
On May 15, 1995, the 3rd stage of the 1995 Giro d'Italia concluded in Marotta with a victory by Mario Cipollini.

== Personalities ==
- Lucia Morico (b. 1975), judoka
- Marotto, Mike

== See also ==
- Mondolfo Airfield
- Mondolfo
