= San Costanzo =

- Comune
- Comune di Costanzo
- San Costanzo within the Province of Pesaro-Urbino

- Location within Italy Location within Marche
- Coordinates: 43°46′N 13°4′E
- Country: Italy
- Region: Marche
- Province: Pesaro e Urbino (PU)
- Frazioni: Cerasa, Marotta, Solfanuccio, Stacciola

Government
  - Mayor: Filippo Sorcinelli

Area
  - Total: 40.89 km^{2} (15.79 sq mi)
- Elevation: 150 m (490 ft)

Population (31 December 2015)
  - Total: 4,786
  - Density: 117.0/km^{2} (303.1/sq mi)
- Demonym: Sancostanzesi
- Time zone: UTC+1 (CET)
  - Summer (DST): UTC+2 (CEST)
- Postal code: 61039
- Dialing code: 0721
- ISTAT code: 041051

San Costanzo is a comune (municipality) in the Province of Pesaro e Urbino in the Italian region Marche, located about 40 kilometres (25 mi) northwest of Ancona and about 20 kilometres (12 mi) southeast of Pesaro.

== Geography ==
The municipality of San Costanzo contains three frazioni (subdivisions, mainly villages and hamlets) Cerasa, Solfanuccio, and Stacciola. A minor portion of Marotta belongs to the municipality.

San Costanzo borders the following municipalities: Fano, Mondolfo, Monte Porzio, Monterado, Terre Roveresche.
