= Macerata Feltria =

- Comune
- Comune di Macerata Feltria
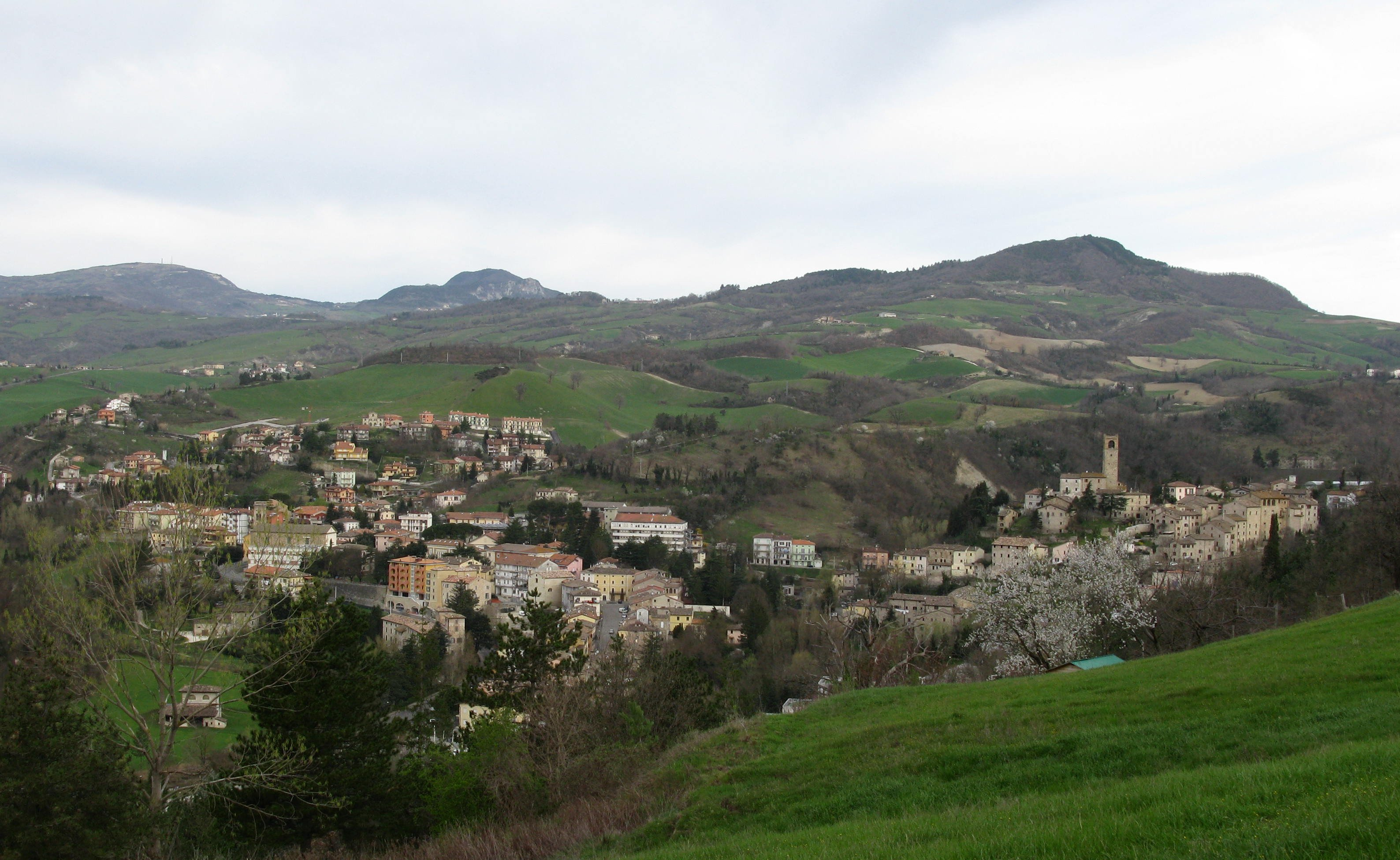
- View of Macerata Feltria

- Location within Italy Location within Marche
- Coordinates: 43°48′N 12°27′E
- Country: Italy
- Region: Marche
- Province: Province of Pesaro e Urbino (PU)
- Frazioni: Apsa, Ca' Antonio, Castellina, Certalto, Grassano, Mondagano, Santa Lucia, Santa Maria Valcava, San Teodoro, San Vicino

Government
  - Mayor: Luciano Arcangeli

Area
  - Total: 40.07 km^{2} (15.47 sq mi)
- Elevation: 321 m (1,053 ft)

Population (31 October 2020)
  - Total: 1,960
  - Density: 48.9/km^{2} (127/sq mi)
- Demonym: Maceratini
- Time zone: UTC+1 (CET)
  - Summer (DST): UTC+2 (CEST)
- Postal code: 61023
- Dialing code: 0722
- Website: Official website

Macerata Feltria is a comune (municipality) in the Province of Pesaro e Urbino in the Italian region Marche, located about 90 kilometres (56 mi) west of Ancona and about 40 kilometres (25 mi) southwest of Pesaro.

Macerata Feltria borders the following municipalities: Lunano, Monte Cerignone, Montecopiolo, Monte Grimano, Piandimeleto, Pietrarubbia, Sassocorvaro Auditore. It is one of I Borghi più belli d'Italia ("The most beautiful villages of Italy").

== History ==
During the Roman Empire, Macerata Feltria was known as Pitinum Pisaurense; it was a small town built in the place of an old Celtic village (in that area the Senones Celts were settled). Its economy was based on the export of wood.

During the 6th century AD, Pitinum Pisaurense was completely destroyed by the Ostrogoths during the Gothic War (535-554). After the year 1000 AD the village was rebuilt using the ruins of the old Pitinum Pisaurense; in facts, the name Macerata means "built with the ruins". This is because its believed to have been built with materials from a nearby ancient Roman Town.

In the late Middle Ages, the village was a fief of the Malatesta family, as part of the Papal States. After the end of World War II half the population emigrated, mainly to Genoa.

In the village there is an archeological museum, exposing the evidences of the village history.
