= Sassocorvaro Auditore =

- Comune
- Comune di Sassocorvaro Auditore
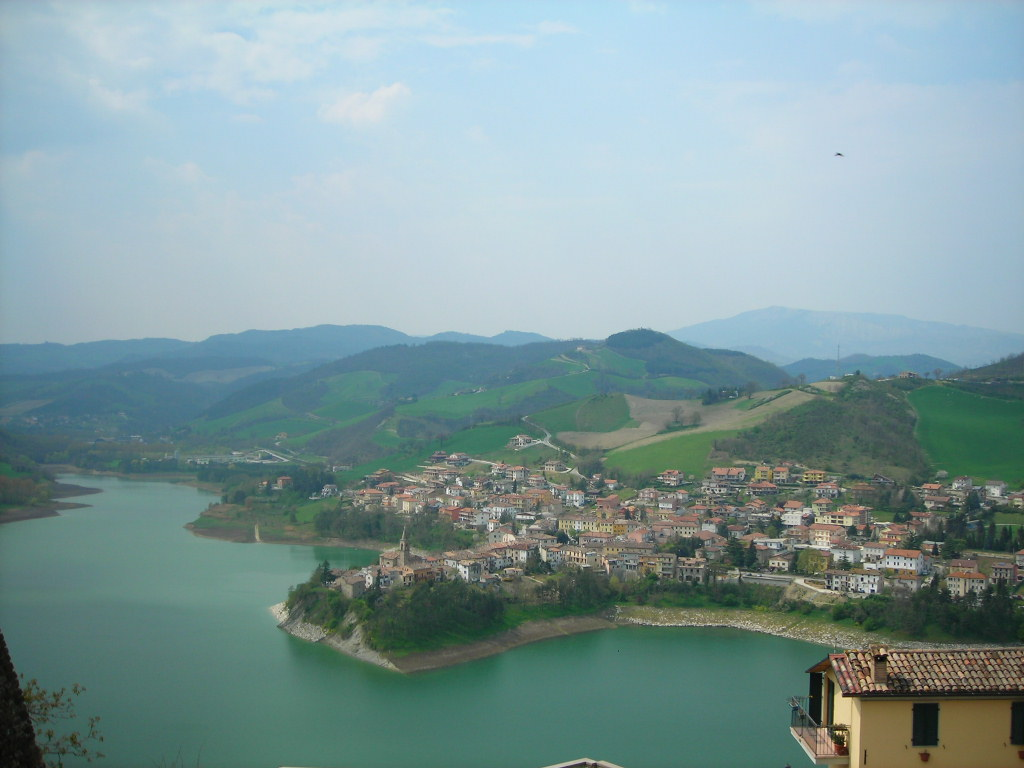
- View of Sassocorvaro

- Location within Italy Location within Marche
- Coordinates: 43°46′48″N 12°29′49″E
- Country: Italy
- Region: Marche
- Province: Pesaro and Urbino (PU)
- Frazioni: Auditore, Bronzo, Ca' Guido, Ca' Angelino, Caprazzino, Case Nuove Provinciali, Casinina, Castelnuovo, Celletta di Valle Avellana, Fontanelle, Mercatale, Molino Fulvi, Piagniano, Pian d'Alberi, San Donato in Taviglione, San Giovanni, San Leo Nuovo, Sassocorvaro.

Government
  - Mayor: Daniele Grossi

Area
  - Total: 87.55 km^{2} (33.80 sq mi)
- Elevation: 326 m (1,070 ft)

Population (31 December 2020)
  - Total: 4,888
  - Density: 55.83/km^{2} (144.6/sq mi)
- Demonym: Sassocorvaresi
- Time zone: UTC+1 (CET)
  - Summer (DST): UTC+2 (CEST)
- Postal code: 61028
- Dialing code: 0722
- Website: Official website

Sassocorvaro Auditore is a comune (municipality) in the Province of Pesaro and Urbino in the Italian region of Marche. It was established on 1 January 2019 with the merger of the municipalities of Sassocorvaro and Auditore.

Sassocorvaro borders the following municipalities: Gemmano, Lunano, Macerata Feltria, Mercatino Conca, Monte Cerignone, Montefiore Conca, Piandimeleto, Tavoleto, Urbino.
