= Monte Porzio =

- Comune
- Comune di Monte Porzio
- Coat of arms

- Monte Porzio within the Province of Pesaro-Urbino

- Location within Italy Location within Marche
- Coordinates: 43°41′N 13°3′E
- Country: Italy
- Region: Marche
- Province: Pesaro e Urbino (PU)
- Frazioni: Castelvecchio

Government
  - Mayor: Giovanni Breccia

Area
  - Total: 18.4 km^{2} (7.1 sq mi)
- Elevation: 105 m (344 ft)

Population (30 November 2017)
  - Total: 2,844
  - Density: 155/km^{2} (400/sq mi)
- Demonym: Monteporziesi
- Time zone: UTC+1 (CET)
  - Summer (DST): UTC+2 (CEST)
- Postal code: 61040
- Dialing code: 0721
- Patron saint: St. Michael Archangel
- Saint day: 29 September
- Website: Official website

Monte Porzio is a comune (municipality) in the Province of Pesaro e Urbino in the Italian region Marche, located about 40 kilometres (25 mi) west of Ancona and about 30 kilometres (19 mi) southeast of Pesaro.

Monte Porzio borders the following municipalities: Corinaldo, Mondavio, San Costanzo, Terre Roveresche, and Trecastelli. It is an agricultural and industrial center on the hills of the left bank of the lower Val Cesano. In the 19th century it was renowned for the production of scissors.
