= Mercatino Conca =

- Comune
- Comune di Mercatino Conca
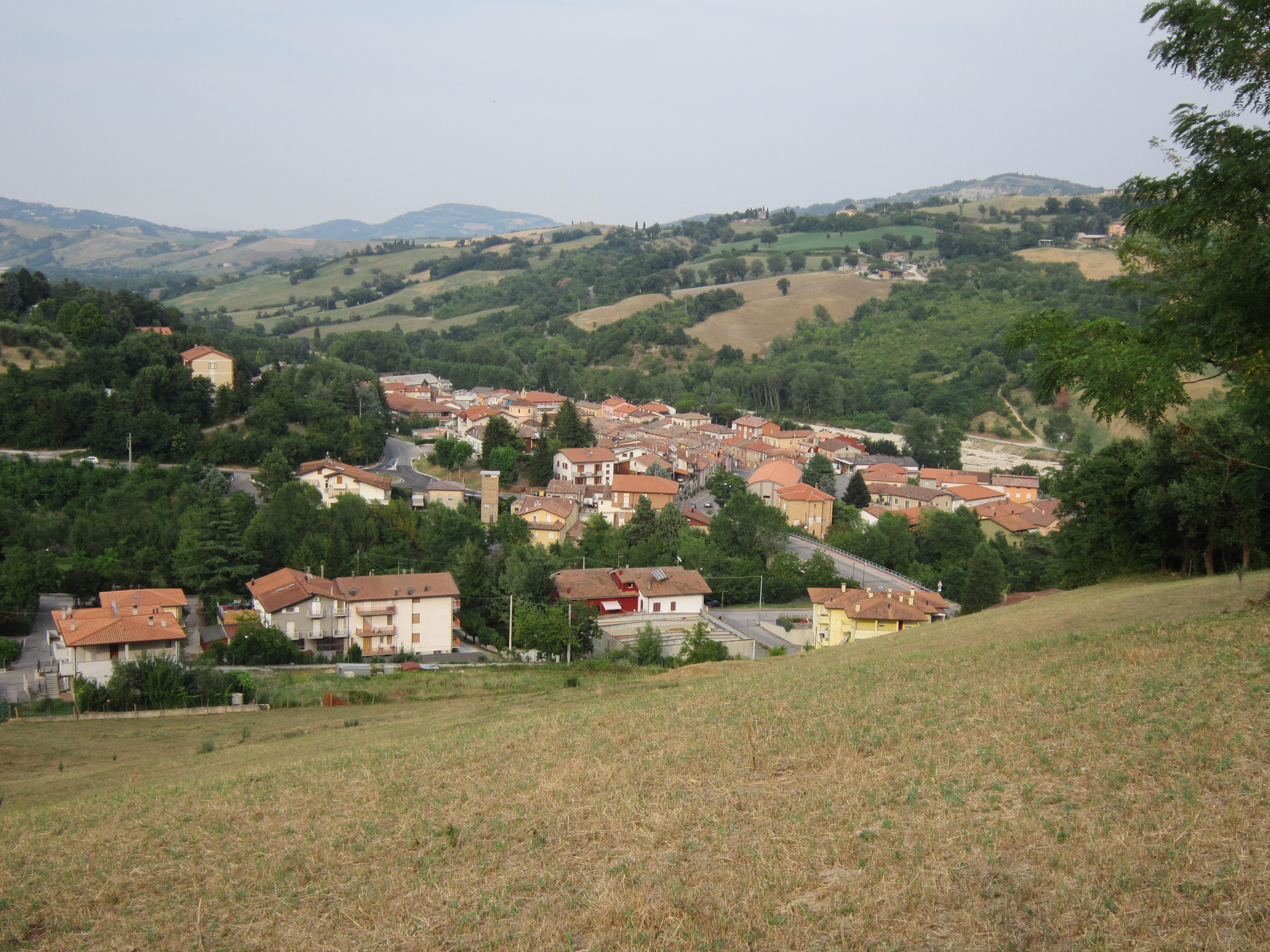
- View of Mercatino Conca

- Coat of arms

- Location within Italy Location within Marche
- Coordinates: 43°52′N 12°29′E
- Country: Italy
- Region: Marche
- Province: Pesaro e Urbino (PU)
- Frazioni: Monte Altavellio, Piandicastello, Ripalta

Government
  - Mayor: Omar Lavanna

Area
  - Total: 13.95 km^{2} (5.39 sq mi)
- Elevation: 275 m (902 ft)

Population (31 October 2020)
  - Total: 995
  - Density: 71.3/km^{2} (185/sq mi)
- Demonym: Mercatinesi
- Time zone: UTC+1 (CET)
  - Summer (DST): UTC+2 (CEST)
- Postal code: 61013
- Dialing code: 0541
- Patron saint: Sant'Ubaldo
- Saint day: May 16
- Website: Official website

Mercatino Conca is a comune (municipality) in the Province of Pesaro e Urbino in the Italian region Marche, located about 90 kilometres (56 mi) northwest of Ancona and about 35 kilometres (22 mi) west of Pesaro. It takes its name from the proximity of the Conca river's dry bed.

Mercatino Conca borders the following municipalities: Gemmano, Monte Cerignone, Monte Grimano, Sassocorvaro Auditore, Sassofeltrio, Tavoleto.
