= Tavoleto =

- Comune
- Comune di Tavoleto
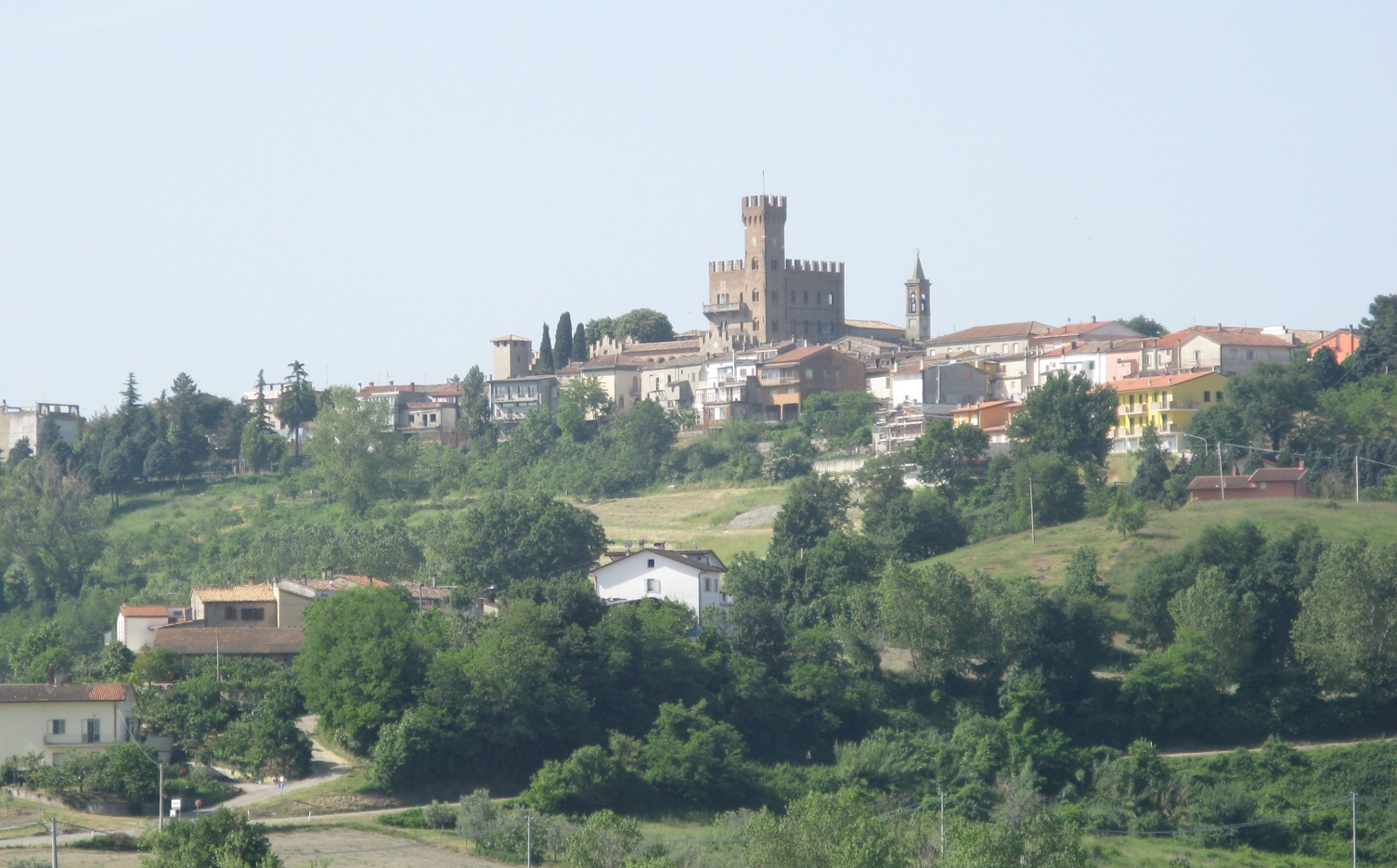
- View of Tavoleto

- Coat of arms

- Location within Italy Location within Marche
- Coordinates: 43°51′N 12°36′E
- Country: Italy
- Region: Marche
- Province: Pesaro e Urbino (PU)
- Frazioni: Casinella

Government
  - Mayor: Stefano Pompei

Area
  - Total: 12.0 km^{2} (4.6 sq mi)
- Elevation: 426 m (1,398 ft)

Population (31 October 2020)
  - Total: 852
  - Density: 71.0/km^{2} (184/sq mi)
- Demonym: Tavoletani
- Time zone: UTC+1 (CET)
  - Summer (DST): UTC+2 (CEST)
- Postal code: 61020
- Dialing code: 0722
- Patron saint: St. Lawrence
- Saint day: August 10
- Website: Official website

Tavoleto is a comune (municipality) with some 868 inhabitants in the Province of Pesaro e Urbino in the Italian region Marche, located about 80 kilometres (50 mi) northwest of Ancona and about 25 kilometres (16 mi) southwest of Pesaro.

Tavoleto borders the following municipalities: Mercatino Conca, Mondaino, Monte Cerignone, Montefiore Conca, Saludecio, Sassocorvaro Auditore, Urbino.
