= San Lorenzo in Campo =

- Comune
- Comune di San Lorenzo in Campo
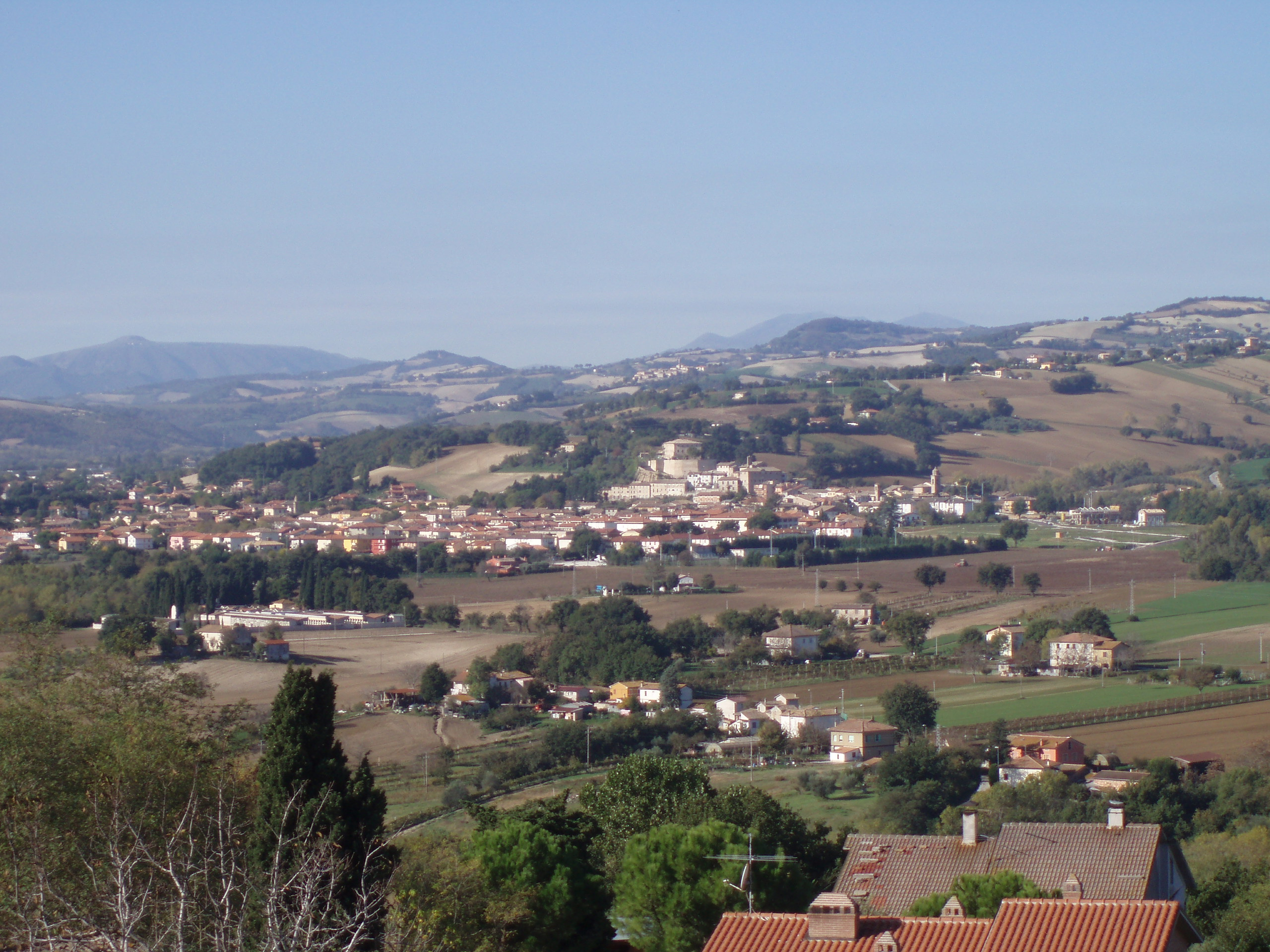
- View of San Lorenzo in Campo

- Coat of arms

- Location within Italy Location within Marche
- Coordinates: 43°36′N 12°57′E
- Country: Italy
- Region: Marche
- Province: Pesaro e Urbino (PU)
- Frazioni: Montalfoglio, San Vito sul Cesano

Government
  - Mayor: Davide Dellonti

Area
  - Total: 28.8 km^{2} (11.1 sq mi)
- Elevation: 209 m (686 ft)

Population (31 October 2020)
  - Total: 3,214
  - Density: 112/km^{2} (289/sq mi)
- Demonym: Laurentini
- Time zone: UTC+1 (CET)
  - Summer (DST): UTC+2 (CEST)
- Postal code: 61047
- Dialing code: 0721
- Patron saint: St. Lawrence
- Saint day: 10 August
- Website: Official website

San Lorenzo in Campo is a comune (municipality) in the Province of Pesaro e Urbino in the Italian region Marche, located about 45 kilometres (28 mi) west of Ancona and about 35 kilometres (22 mi) south of Pesaro.

The main attraction is the Gothic church of San Lorenzo, once part of a Benedictine abbey.
