= Mombaroccio =

- Comune
- Comune di Mombaroccio
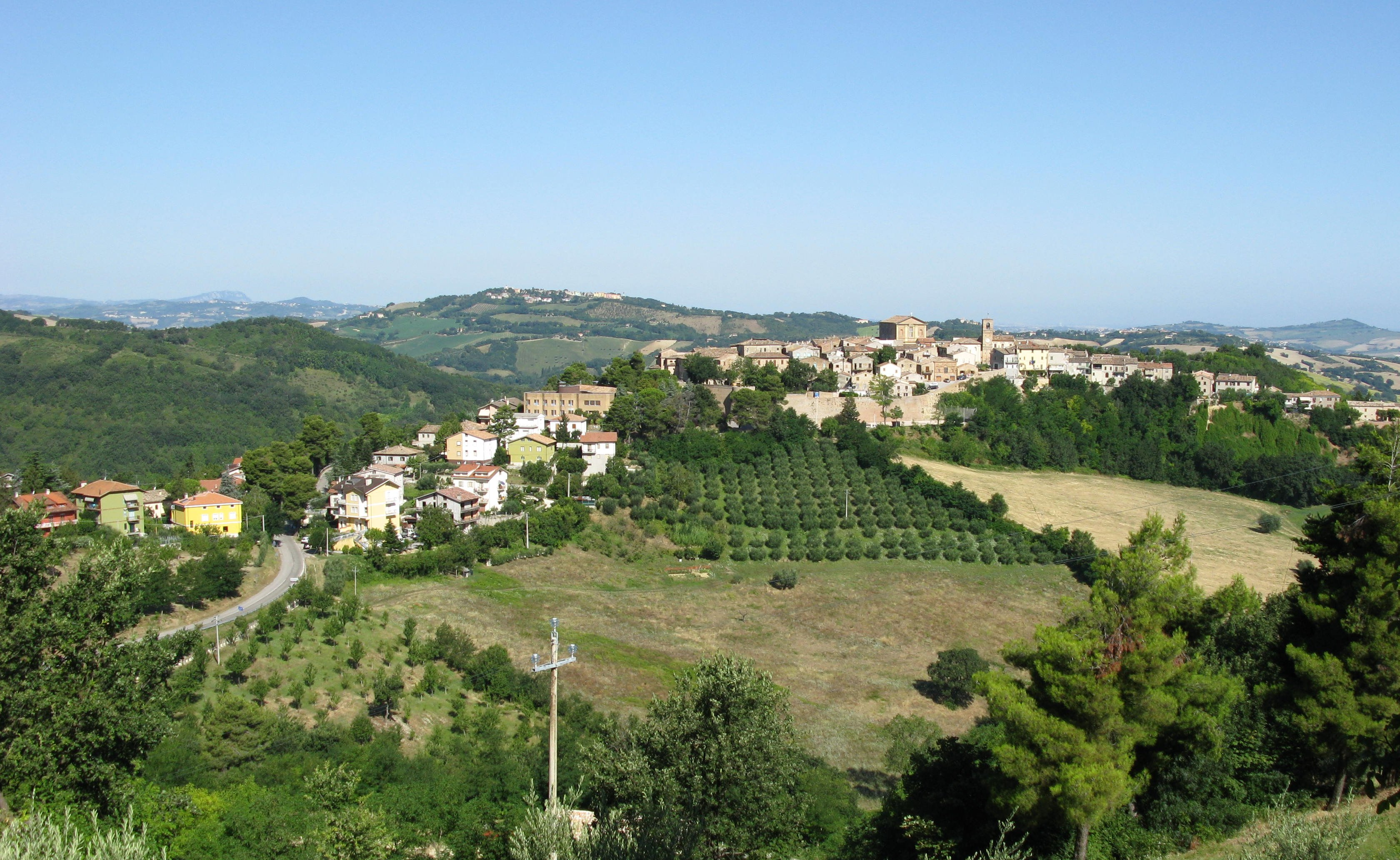
- View of Mombaroccio

- Coat of arms

- Location within Italy Location within Marche
- Coordinates: 43°48′N 12°51′E
- Country: Italy
- Region: Marche
- Province: Pesaro e Urbino (PU)
- Frazioni: Montegiano, Villagrande

Government
  - Mayor: Emanuele Petrucci

Area
  - Total: 28.2 km^{2} (10.9 sq mi)
- Elevation: 321 m (1,053 ft)

Population (31 October 2020)
  - Total: 2,055
  - Density: 72.9/km^{2} (189/sq mi)
- Demonym: Mombaroccesi
- Time zone: UTC+1 (CET)
  - Summer (DST): UTC+2 (CEST)
- Postal code: 61024
- Dialing code: 0721
- Patron saint: St. Vitus and Modestus
- Saint day: 15 June
- Website: Official website

Mombaroccio is a comune (municipality) in the Province of Pesaro e Urbino in the Italian region Marche, located about 60 kilometres (37 mi) northwest of Ancona and about 14 kilometres (9 mi) southwest of Pesaro.
