= Fratte Rosa =

- Comune
- Comune di Fratte Rosa
- Fratte Rosa

- Location within Italy Location within Marche
- Coordinates: 43°38′N 12°54′E
- Country: Italy
- Region: Marche
- Province: Pesaro e Urbino (PU)
- Frazioni: Convento Santa Vittoria, Torre San Marco

Government
  - Mayor: Alessandro Avaltroni

Area
  - Total: 15.63 km^{2} (6.03 sq mi)
- Elevation: 419 m (1,375 ft)

Population (31 July 2021)
  - Total: 857
  - Density: 54.8/km^{2} (142/sq mi)
- Demonym: Frattesi
- Time zone: UTC+1 (CET)
  - Summer (DST): UTC+2 (CEST)
- Postal code: 61040
- Dialing code: 0721
- Patron saint: Saint Michael the Archangel
- Saint day: 29 September
- Website: Official website

Fratte Rosa is a comune (municipality) in the Province of Pesaro e Urbino, in the Marche region of central Italy. It is situated approximately 50 kilometres (31 mi) west of Ancona and 30 kilometres (19 mi) south of Pesaro, at an elevation of 419 metres (1,375 ft) above sea level. As of July 2021, the municipality had a population of 857.

The municipality includes the frazioni of Convento Santa Vittoria and Torre San Marco.
