= Montefelcino =

- Comune
- Comune di Montefelcino
- Coat of arms

- Location within Italy Location within Marche
- Coordinates: 43°44′N 12°50′E
- Country: Italy
- Region: Marche
- Province: Pesaro e Urbino (PU)
- Frazioni: Fontecorniale, Monteguiduccio, Montemontanaro, Ponte degli Alberi, Sterpeti, Villa Palombara, Ville

Government
  - Mayor: Osvaldo Pelagaggia

Area
  - Total: 39.01 km^{2} (15.06 sq mi)
- Elevation: 260 m (850 ft)

Population (28 February 2009)
  - Total: 2,503
  - Density: 64.16/km^{2} (166.2/sq mi)
- Demonym: Montefelcinesi
- Time zone: UTC+1 (CET)
  - Summer (DST): UTC+2 (CEST)
- Postal code: 61030
- Dialing code: 0721
- Patron saint: St. Esuperantius
- Saint day: 24 January
- Website: Official website

Montefelcino is a comune (municipality) in the Province of Pesaro e Urbino in the Italian region Marche, located about 60 kilometres (37 mi) west of Ancona and about 20 kilometres (12 mi) south of Pesaro.
