= Lunano =

- Comune
- Comune di Lunano
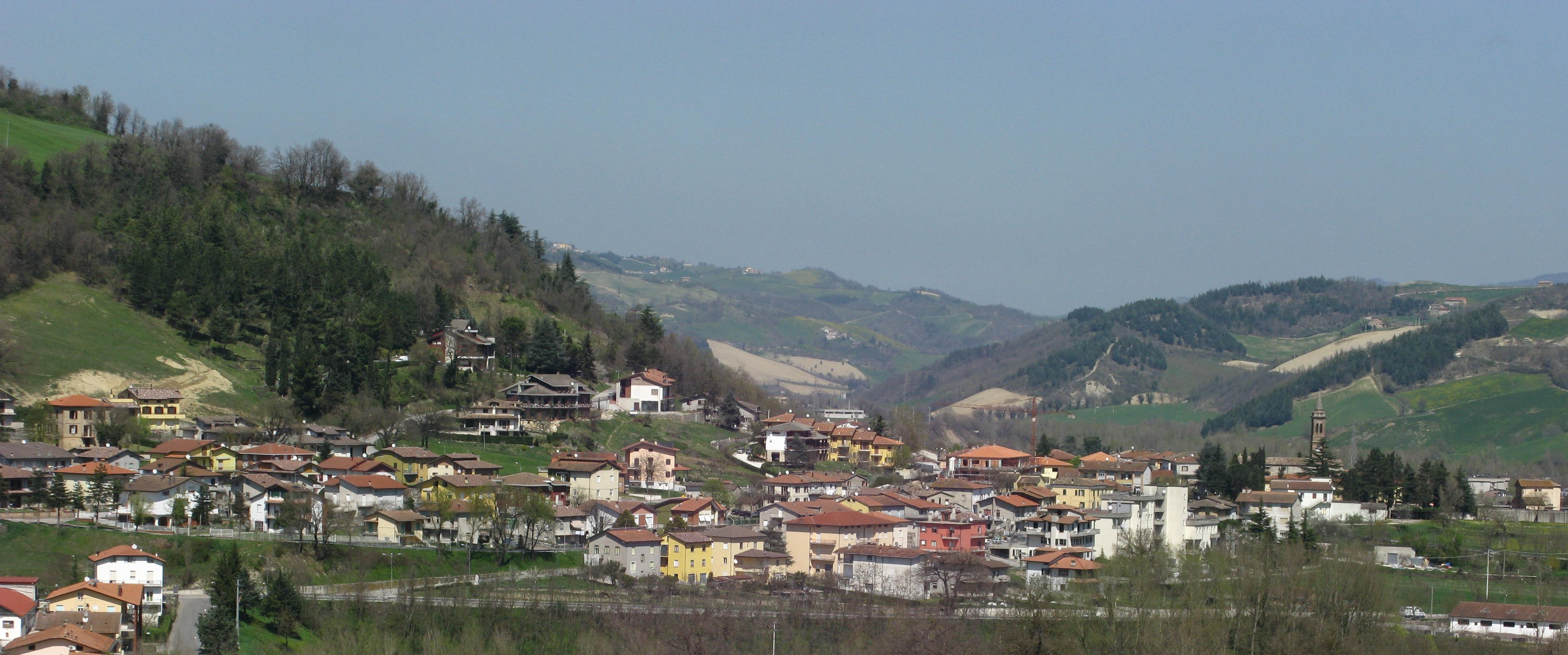
- View of Lunano

- Location within Italy Location within Marche
- Coordinates: 43°44′N 12°26′E
- Country: Italy
- Region: Marche
- Province: Pesare e Urbino (PU)
- Frazioni: Serra di Piastra

Government
  - Mayor: Mauro Dini

Area
  - Total: 15.01 km^{2} (5.80 sq mi)
- Elevation: 297 m (974 ft)

Population (31 October 2020)
  - Total: 1,452
  - Density: 96.74/km^{2} (250.5/sq mi)
- Demonym: Lunanesi
- Time zone: UTC+1 (CET)
  - Summer (DST): UTC+2 (CEST)
- Postal code: 61020
- Dialing code: 0772
- Patron saint: Sts. Cosmas and Damian
- Saint day: 26 September
- Website: Official website

Lunano is a small town and comune in the province of Pesaro e Urbino in the Marche region of central Italy.

It is located in the mountainous area of Montefeltro, in the Foglia River Valley. Resting on a hill overlooking the town is the Castle of Lunano, which dates back to before the 13th century. Just outside the centre of town is the Franciscan Convent of Monte Illuminato, which was allegedly visited by Saint Francis in 1213.

The Montefeltro area, and Lunano in particular, are known for the Chestnut Festival which takes place on the third Sunday in October every year.
