= Province of Pesaro and Urbino =

Province of Italy

Coordinates: 43°54′36.54″N 12°54′47.88″E

Province of Pesaro and Urbino Provincia di Pesaro e Urbino (Italian)
- Province
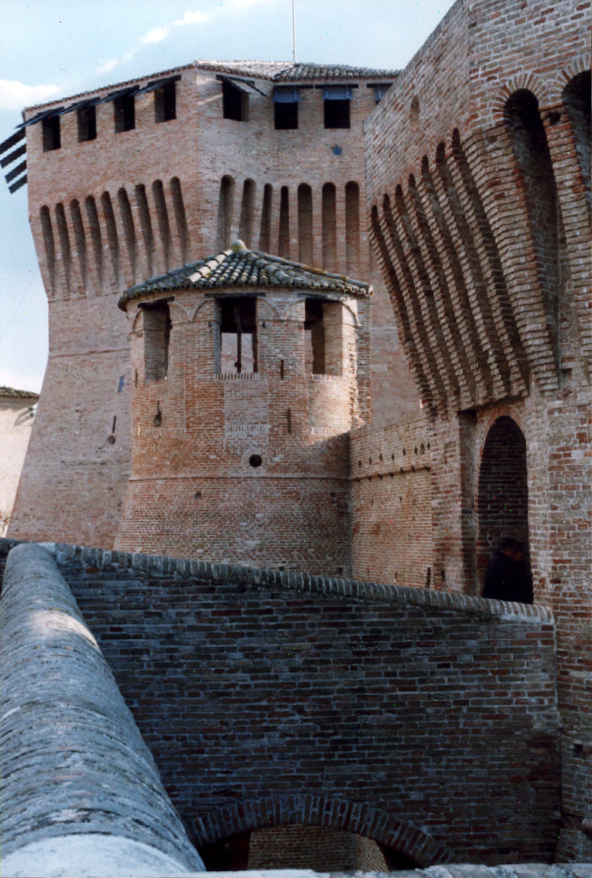
- Rocca of Mondavio

- Flag Coat of arms

- Location of the province of Pesaro and Urbino in Italy
- Country: Italy
- Region: Marche
- Capital(s): Pesaro and Urbino
- Municipalities: 50

Government
  - President: Alberto Alessandri

Area (Note: Excluding the municipalities that detached from the province after 2009)
  - Total: 2,510.89 km^{2} (969.46 sq mi)

Population (2026)
  - Total: 349,556
  - Density: 139.216/km^{2} (360.568/sq mi)

GDP
  - Total: €9.314 billion (2015)
  - Per capita: €25,697 (2015)
- Time zone: UTC+1 (CET)
  - Summer (DST): UTC+2 (CEST)
- Telephone prefix: 0721 Pesaro 0722 Urbino
- Vehicle registration: PU
- ISTAT code: 041
- Website: www.provincia.ps.it

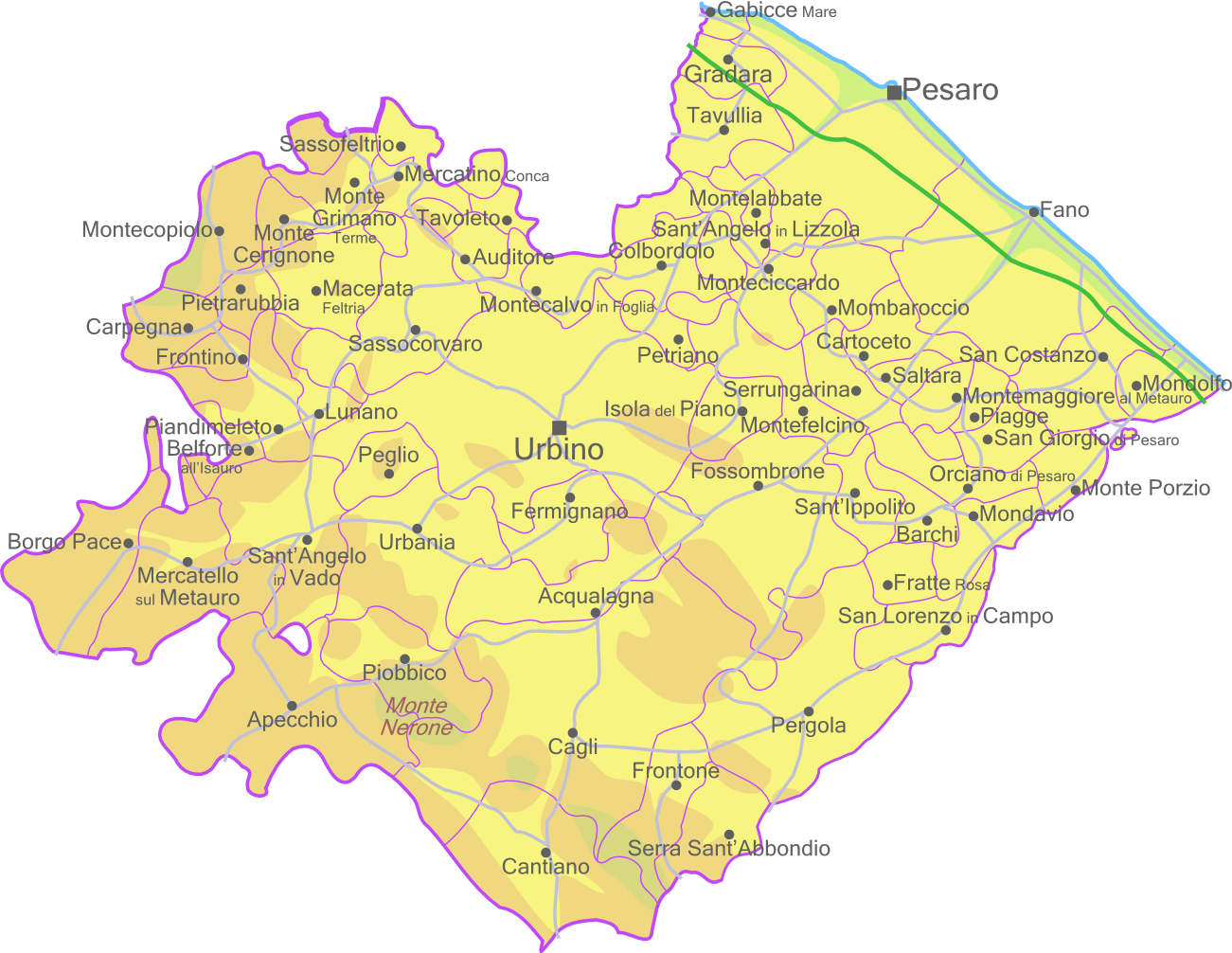
Map of the province

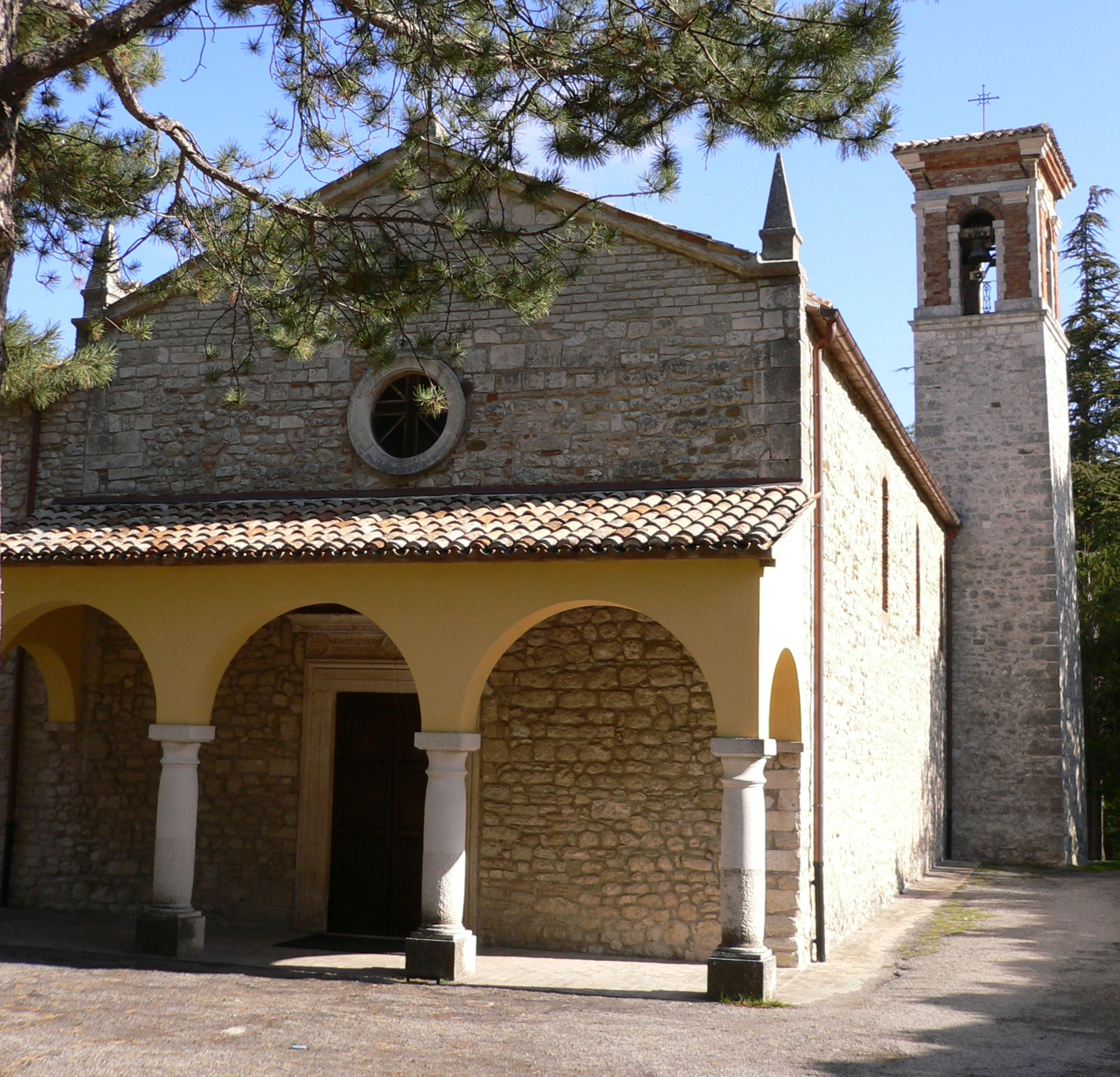
Sanctuary of Santa Maria in Val d'Abisso at Piobbico

The province of Pesaro and Urbino (Italian: provincia di Pesaro e Urbino, Italian: [proˈvintʃa di ˈpeːzaro e urˈbiːno]) is a province in the region of Marche in Italy. Its capitals are the city of Pesaro and the town of Urbino.

It has a population of 349,556 in an area of 2,510.89 square kilometres (969.46 sq mi) across its 50 municipalities.

It borders the state of San Marino. The province is surrounded by San Marino and Emilia Romagna in the north, Umbria and Tuscany in the west, Ancona in the south and the Adriatic Sea on the east. The province has an enclave of the Umbrian commune of Citta' di Castello named Monte Ruperto.

The province is also known as "Riviera of Hills". It is mostly covered by hills and is popular for its beaches.

The ceramics museum and the Biblioteca Oliveriana are located in the capital city.

The Lucus Pisaurensis, the Sacred Grove of Pisaurum, ancient Pesaro, is just outside modern Pesaro in the hamlet of Santa Veneranda.

== History ==
Early sources indicate a pre-Etruscan settlement in Pesaro. The city was established as Pisaurum by the Romans in 184 BC as a colony of the Picentes, an early Italic people who lived on the northeast coast of Italy during the Iron Age. In 1737, 13 ancient votive stones were unearthed in a local Pesaro farm field, each bearing the inscription of a Roman god; these were written in a pre-Etruscan script, indicating a much earlier occupation of the area than the 184 BC Picentes colony. After the fall of the Western Roman Empire, the area was absorbed in the Exarchate of Ravenna. In late mediaeval times and early Renaissance it was the center of the county of Urbino, and later, the Duchy of Montefeltro. Later it was part of the Papal States and, from the late 19th century, of the Kingdom of Italy.

After the referendum of 2006, seven municipalities of Montefeltro were detached from the Province to join the Province of Rimini (Emilia-Romagna) on 15 August 2009. The municipalities are Casteldelci, Maiolo, Novafeltria, Pennabilli, San Leo, Sant'Agata Feltria and Talamello.

On 17 June 2021, the municipalities of Montecopiolo and Sassofeltrio were transferred from the Province of Pesaro and Urbino to the Province of Rimini.

== Government ==
=== Municipalities ===
The province has 50 municipalities:

- Acqualagna
- Apecchio
- Belforte all'Isauro
- Borgo Pace
- Cagli
- Cantiano
- Carpegna
- Cartoceto
- Colli al Metauro
- Fano
- Fermignano
- Fossombrone
- Fratte Rosa
- Frontino
- Frontone
- Gabicce Mare
- Gradara
- Isola del Piano
- Lunano
- Macerata Feltria
- Mercatello sul Metauro
- Mercatino Conca
- Mombaroccio
- Mondavio
- Mondolfo
- Monte Cerignone
- Monte Grimano Terme
- Monte Porzio
- Montecalvo in Foglia
- Montefelcino
- Montelabbate
- Peglio
- Pergola
- Pesaro
- Petriano
- Piandimeleto
- Pietrarubbia
- Piobbico
- San Costanzo
- San Lorenzo in Campo
- Sant'Angelo in Vado
- Sant'Ippolito
- Sassocorvaro Auditore
- Serra Sant'Abbondio
- Tavoleto
- Tavullia
- Terre Roveresche
- Urbania
- Urbino
- Vallefoglia

== Demographics ==
As of 2026, the population is 349,556, of which 49.4% are male, and 50.6% are female. Minors make up 14.0% of the population, and seniors make up 26.1%.

Historical population
(current borders)

Year	Pop.	±%
1861	184,420	—
1871	198,167	+7.5%
1881	204,509	+3.2%
1901	232,374	+13.6%
1911	247,753	+6.6%
1921	260,146	+5.0%
1931	269,385	+3.6%
1936	278,885	+3.5%

Year	Pop.	±%
1951	301,156	+8.0%
1961	288,634	−4.2%
1971	296,920	+2.9%
1981	313,897	+5.7%
1991	316,650	+0.9%
2001	331,364	+4.6%
2011	359,963	+8.6%
2021	349,818	−2.8%

Source: ISTAT

=== Immigration ===
As of 2025, immigrants make up 13.2% of the population. The 5 largest foreign countries of birth are Albania, Morocco, Moldova, Romania, and Switzerland.

== Economy ==
It has a robust economy with low unemployment, based on small and medium enterprises active in manufacturing, agriculture, tourism, other services. It has a very low per capita energy consumption. The small manufacturing industry contributes 22% of the province's GDP.

=== Tourism ===
Tourism in the province plays a primary role in the local economy; the main attractions are the coast and the Apennines. The beaches of Gabicce Mare, Pesaro, Fano and Marotta are the most famous ones.
