= Sorbolongo =

- Comune
- Comune di Sorbolongo
- Location of Sorbolongo in Italy Sorbolongo (Marche)
- Coordinates: 43°40′21″N 12°53′41″E
- Country: Italy
- Region: Marche
- Province: Pesaro and Urbino (PU)
- Elevation: 357 m (1,171 ft)

Population (2004)
  - Total: 459
- Time zone: UTC+1 (CET)
  - Summer (DST): UTC+2 (CEST)
- Postal code: 61040
- Dialing code: 0721
- Patron saint: Saint Michael the Archangel
- Website: English website

Sorbolongo is a town consisting of about 460 inhabitants in the municipality of Sant'Ippolito in the province of Pesaro and Urbino, Italy. It is almost completely made up of a castle that still maintains its original medieval structure. Sorbolongo castle is located on the hills between the Metauro and Cesano river valleys, located on the road that connects the capital Sant'Ippolito to the neighboring municipality of Barchi.

The name of the castle probably derives from the presence of a rowan particularly high on the hill where the village now stands. This view is supported by the emblem that stands above the entrance gate of the church of the village. The castle was under the jurisdiction of the lords of Fano until the time of Napoleon I.

== Notable people ==
- Ignatius of Jesus (born Carlo Leonelli) – Discalced Carmelite missionary (1596-1667)
- Innocenzo Leonelli – Soldier and hermit (died 1625)
- Mutatesia Leonelli – Treasurer of the Pontifical Chambers (died 1662)
- Giulio Leonelli – Governor of Turin (died 1614)
