= Hans Wallach =

- Born: November 28, 1904; Berlin
- Died: February 5, 1998 (aged 93); Media, Pennsylvania, U.S.
- Awards: Member of National Academy of Sciences, APA Distinguished Contribution Award, Howard Crosby Warren Medal

Academic work
- School or tradition: Gestalt psychology
- Main interests: visual and auditory perception, perceptual adaptation
- Notable ideas: Precedence effect (audition), Kinetic depth effect (vision)

Hans Wallach (November 28, 1904 – February 5, 1998) was a German-American experimental psychologist whose research focused on perception and learning. Although he was trained in the Gestalt psychology tradition, much of his later work explored the adaptability of perceptual systems based on the perceiver's experience, whereas most Gestalt theorists emphasized inherent qualities of stimuli and downplayed the role of experience. Wallach's studies of achromatic surface color laid the groundwork for subsequent theories of lightness constancy, and his work on sound localization elucidated the perceptual processing that underlies stereophonic sound. He was a member of the National Academy of Sciences, a Guggenheim Fellow, and recipient of the Howard Crosby Warren Medal of the Society of Experimental Psychologists.

== Life ==
Wallach was born in Berlin on November 28, 1904, to a Jewish family. Following early studies in chemistry, he enrolled at the Berlin Psychological Institute, serving first as assistant to its director, Wolfgang Köhler, and subsequently conducting research of his own. He completed the work for a PhD degree in 1934, (Note: The date of Wallach's Ph.D. is sometimes given as 1935. The work was completed in 1934, and the degree was formally awarded upon publication of the dissertation in 1935) hurrying because his vulnerable position as a Jew in Nazi Germany had led him to decide on emigration. Jewish professors were being dismissed from universities. Wallach considered himself poorly prepared when he took his oral exams, relating later, "I shall never forget the kindness of [two professors] who, aware of my precarious situation, allowed me to pass.".

Köhler, who was not Jewish but who strongly resisted the growing Nazi influence, had decided to emigrate as well. In 1935 he was offered a position at Swarthmore College, in Pennsylvania. The following year he invited Wallach to join him as a research associate. Wallach worked at Swarthmore for the rest of his career. For the first six years he did not teach but only conducted research, but in 1942 the demands of the war effort depleted the psychology department faculty, and Wallach (who was ineligible for military service) was appointed as an instructor. He rose through academic ranks, becoming a full professor in 1953, and chair of the psychology department from 1957 to 1966. In 1971 he was designated Centennial Professor of Psychology. He retired from teaching in 1975, but remained active in research until 1994.

In addition to his work at Swarthmore, Wallach was a visiting professor at the New School for Social Research in New York from 1947 to 1957. In 1948 he held a Guggenheim Fellowship, and in 1954–55 he was a member of the Institute for Advanced Study at Princeton.

Wallach was married to artist Phoebe Kasper, and they had a son Karl. Phoebe died in 1968. Hans Wallach died on February 5, 1998. Their son Karl Wallach died in 2001.

== Psychological research ==
Wallach was not a theorist, and he did not organize his research around an overarching theoretical system. He described his style of working as "pursuing a problem as long as the work yielded worthwhile results, and then shelving it until a new idea promised progress." His studies span a broad range of psychological topics, including the following:

=== Movement of lines behind apertures ===
Wallach's doctoral dissertation examined perception of lines moving behind an opening in a masking surface – a phenomenon known as the aperture problem. If a slanted line moves behind such an aperture, the physical stimulus presented to the eyes will not distinguish whether the movement is horizontal, vertical, or at some other angle. Wallach found that the motion the observer perceives is determined by the shape of the aperture. If the aperture is circular, the line (or lines) will appear to move in a direction perpendicular to their orientation. But if the aperture is rectangular, the lines will seem to move in a direction parallel to the long axis of the aperture. An example of this phenomenon is the familiar Barberpole illusion. Wallach explained this finding by asserting that the perceptual system tends to preserve the individual identity of the line segments defined by the end points created by the aperture, and that this mode of movement best preserves that identity.

Because the original paper was in German, this research was not well known to English-speaking psychologists for several decades. In 1976, Wallach published an English summary of his dissertation experiments,. Twenty years later, in 1996, Sophie Wuerger, Robert Shapley, and Nava Rubin published a complete English translation, adding an introduction in which they state that Wallach's findings

are relevant to contemporary research, and have implications not only for the study of motion perception but also form and color perception. His results provide evidence against a modular scheme of visual processing, where form, color, and motion are computed in isolation. Instead. he found that the perceived direction of motion was linked to the perceptual organization of the scene: when several interpretations of the form exist, and several directions of motion are possible, only certain combinations of form and motion are perceived.

=== Figural after-effects ===
In a frequently-cited paper (Note: According to Harris, in 2001 Science Citation Index indicated that the most frequently cited papers of which Wallach was the senior author were The kinetic depth effect (1953) and The precedence effect in sound localization (1949). A Google Scholar search on June 21, 2013 supports this conclusion, listing 816 citations for the first and 490 citations for the second. Brightness constancy and the nature of achromatic colors (1948) followed, with 363 citations. Figural after-effects: An investigation of visual processes (1944) had 793 citations, but Köhler was the senior author of that article.) published in 1944, Köhler and Wallach presented a series of experiments on figural after-effects. If, for example, an observer stares for about a minute at a fixation point in the center of a visual field that is white except for a large black rectangle on the left side, and then (with the rectangle removed) looks at the center of an array of four evenly-spaced squares, symmetrically arranged around the fixation point, the two squares on the left side will appear farther apart than the ones on the right. Many similar observations are discussed in the Köhler and Wallach paper.

Köhler considered that this phenomenon supported his theory of psychophysical isomorphism – that the perception of forms is mediated by electrical fields on the cortex of the brain, fields which he thought were isomorphic to the stimulus but which could be distorted through a process of satiation. However, Wallach came to doubt this explanation and in subsequent years dissociated himself from this research. In general Wallach avoided neurophysiological explanations for perceptual phenomena, and the paper on figural after-effects was not included in a collection of his articles that Wallach published in 1976.

=== Sound localization ===
In a series of papers Wallach explored the ability of humans to locate sounds in the median plane – that is, to determine whether a sound comes from a source at the same elevation as the ears or from a source that is higher or lower, or even in back of the head. Binaural sound cues, including the phasing or time of the sound's arrival at each ear and the sound's relative intensity at the two ears (known respectively as ITD and ILD) enable a listener to determine a sound's lateral location (whether it is on the left, right, or straight ahead). But two sounds at different elevations can present identical ITD and ILD information to the ears, and so binaural cues to a stationary ear do not suffice to identify a sound's location in the median plane. Monaural cues that depend on the shape of the head and the structure of the external ear help with vertical localization, but binaural cues also play a part if the head is not stationary.

Wallach's research showed that when the human head moves (either by tilting or by rotating around a vertical axis), it creates a dynamic pattern of binaural cues that can, when paired with information about the direction and extent of the head movement, enable a listener to determine the elevation of a sound source. It is not necessary that the listener actively make the head movements; a subsequent paper demonstrated that sounds could be correctly located in the median plane when the observer is passively rotated or when a false sense of bodily rotation is induced by means of visual cues.

In 1949 Wallach, in collaboration with Edwin B. Newman and Mark Rosenzweig, published a seminal paper defining the precedence effect in sound localization. Their experiments demonstrated that when a localizable sound reaches the ears and is immediately followed by an identical sound coming from a different direction, the listener perceives a single sound at the location of the first-arriving stimulus. The delay between the first-arriving and the second-arriving sound can be in the range of 1 to 5 ms for clicks, and as much as 40 ms for complex sounds such as speech and music. At delays above these thresholds, the second sound is heard as an echo. This phenomenon illustrates how the auditory system suppresses local reverberations to enhance the intelligibility of perceived sounds and it is a critical factor in acoustical engineering and design of sound reinforcement systems. Wallach et al. also noted that the precedence effect plays an important part in perception of stereophonic sound.

=== Achromatic color and brightness constancy ===
In a widely admired (Note: For example, the experiments in the 1948 paper have been described as "important", "classic", "elegant", and "landmark".) paper published in 1948, Wallach explored the stimulus conditions for the perception of neutral colors – that is, colors that vary in lightness but have no hue, thus ranging from white to gray to black. Wallach projected round patches of light (“disks”) of various brightnesses on a white screen in a dark room and found that, when presented alone, the disks always appeared to be luminous – i.e. they seemed to be emitting light, just as the moon appears when it is high in a dark sky. However, when a surrounding ring of a different brightness was added to such a projected disk, the disk ceased to appear luminous and looked like a patch of smooth paper whose color depended on the relative brightnesses of the central disk and the surrounding ring .If the surround was less bright than the disk in the center, the disk appeared white. If the surround was brighter than the center, the central disk appeared to be a shade of gray. The shade of gray depended on the brightness ratio of the center to the surround, regardless of the absolute luminance levels of the two elements in the display. Thus, for example, a disk with a physical luminance of 50 millilamberts (mL) surrounded by a ring of 200 mL would seem to be the same shade of gray as a disk of 500 mL surrounded by a ring of 2000 mL.

Wallach proposed that this "ratio principle" could explain the phenomenon of lightness constancy (Note: Confusion sometimes arises regarding the terms "lightness constancy" and "brightness constancy." Brightness refers to the amount of light that falls on an object, and lightness refers to its apparent color on a scale ranging from white to black. Technically, the constancy could be called "constancy of lightness under varying conditions of brightness." In practice, "lightness constancy" and "brightness constancy" are used interchangeably. A more general term is color constancy, the latter term incorporating constancy across various chromatic hues as well as lightness on a black-white scale.) – the fact that an object's apparent lightness remains constant despite large variations in illumination. In subsequent years, a large body of literature (Note: Good overviews of this literature can be found in Gilchrist et al. and Hochberg.) has explored the adequacy and limitations of the ratio principle. The ratio principle does not hold if the luminance ratio is extremely high; or if the two interacting luminances are not adjacent. Furthermore, Wallach's highly simplified experimental setup does not deal with three-dimensional spatial arrangements nor with complex visual fields that include many interacting luminances. Rather than providing a complete solution to the problem of lightness constancy, Wallach's 1948 paper served to "set the stage for computational models of lightness perception".

=== The kinetic depth effect ===
Wallach's most widely citred paper is his 1953 study (with D. N. O’Connell) of the kinetic depth effect. This phenomenon illustrates how the visual system processes displays of dynamically-changing elements so that we perceive a world of rigid objects arranged in space.

If a stationary three-dimensional figure (for example, a wireform cube) is illuminated from behind so that its shadow falls on a translucent screen, an observer in front of the screen will see a two-dimensional pattern of lines. But if the same object is rotated, the observer will (accurately) see it as a turning three-dimensional cube, even though only two-dimensional information is presented. This is the kinetic depth effect (KDE), a potent depth cue. It occurs spontaneously, it can be seen with monocular vision, it occurs with solid figures as well as wireforms, and the figures need not be regular geometric objects nor need they have familiar shapes. Wallach and O’Connell found only two essential conditions for obtaining the effect. The object must be composed of straight lines with definite endpoints or corners, and the projected shadows of those lines must change in both length and orientation as the object rotates (otherwise a flat, deforming figure is seen.)

The Wallach & O’Connell KDE findings triggered a large number of studies. Some researchers explored the phenomenal experience of three-dimensionality and ways to objectively measure it. Others sought to build theoretical models of the essential conditions for dynamically representing rigid three-dimensional objects using only two dimensions, leading to development of a new field of study: structure from motion, a part of the domain of cognitive science. Practical applications have included representing the third dimension in computer displays, palmtop devices, and airport security scanners.

=== Adaptation in perception of depth and distance ===
Since a human's two eyes are approximately 6.5 cm apart, they see the world from different viewpoints: the image projected on the left retina is slightly different from the image projected on the right. This difference (known as binocular disparity) is the fundamental cue underlying stereoscopic depth perception . The importance of stereoscopic perception is familiar to anyone who has ever attempted to thread a needle with one eye closed; and when two slightly disparate photographs are viewed through a stereoscope (a device that makes it easy to fuse the two images), the fused scene takes on a three-dimensional appearance. (Note: There are a great many theories regarding the mechanisms by which stereoscopic depth perception operated. Good summaries can be found in Kaufman and Hochberg.)

In 1963, Wallach, Moore and Davidson artificially increased disparity by having subjects look through a telestereoscope, a device which uses a mirror arrangement to simulate an increased distance between the eyes. When they viewed a wireform cube through the telestereoscope, subjects reported that the cube's depth appeared greater than its width and height, a result of the greater disparity generated by the telestereoscope. After this, the cube was made to rotate slowly while the subjects watched. This created a conflict between two depth cues: while the artificially-increased disparity was indicating that the cube's depth was greater than its other two dimensions, the kinetic depth effect (which is not affected by disparity) was presenting cues consistent with a normal rotating cube, of equal size on all sides.

After watching the rotating cube in this cue-conflict situation for a 10-minute adaptation period, subjects were again showed the stationary cube (still through the telestereoscope) and asked to indicate its depth. They reported less apparent depth than before the adaptation period, indicating that conflict from the competing KDE cue had modified the way the visual system interpreted the stereoscopic depth cues. The altered perception of depth was temporary: it could easily be unlearned (by watching the cube rotate without the telestereoscope), and the effect dissipated spontaneously after a few minutes, even with if the subjects simply sat with eyes closed during that time.

Subsequently, Wallach and Frey performed similar experiments creating a conflict among different cues that the visual system uses to compute the distance of an object from the observer. (Note: In everyday language, "depth" often refers simply to the third dimension, the z-axis in a geometrical framework where "width" represents the x-axis and "height" the y-axis. In this sense, "depth" and "distance" are synonymous. In some technical discussions of visual perception, however, the terms have distinct meanings: "distance" is used to describe how far away from the observer something is, and "depth" refers to an object’s intrinsic three-dimensionality. For example, someone might hold up a thin book in one hand and a thick book in the other. Both books would be the same distance from a facing observer, but they would have different degrees of depth. This distinction between depth and distance is used in the research described here.) Two such cues are accommodation (adjustments of the eye's lens to bring near or far objects into focus) and convergence (the inward turning of the eyes necessary to fixate on near objects). These two cues together are called oculomotor cues. Other cues also play a part in distance perception; among these are perspective, texture gradients, and motor cues (when we reach out to touch an object, we acquire information about how far away it is.)

Wallach and Frey constructed special goggles that artificially distorted oculomotor distance cues, such that the wearer would see objects with accommodation and convergence cues appropriate to distances closer than the objects’ actual distances. The subjects wore the glasses while physically manipulating a set of small wooden blocks set on a table, and thus perspective, texture and motor cues gave veridical information. After 15 minutes of adaptation, tests showed that subjects (now without the goggles) registered the distance of test objects as being farther than their objective distances. A different set of goggles, simulating the oculomotor cues for distances greater than veridical, yielded the opposite result.

These findings – that exposure to cue-conflict situations modifies the way in which the visual system evaluates cues – represented a definite step away from the Gestalt tradition in which Wallach was trained. Gestalt psychologists preferred to explain perceptual phenomena through the characteristics of the stimulus complex taken as a whole, and through inborn, invariant functions of the perceptual system. They generally downplayed the role of experience and adaptation.

=== Perception of a stable environment ===
From the mid-1960s through the end of his career, Wallach engaged in an extensive study of the mechanisms that underlie the apparent stability of the human visual world despite movements of the head, the eyes, or the whole body. (Note: In 1987, Wallach published an overview of his research in this domain. For completeness, the original papers in which various experiments were published are given here, but the 1987 article provides a general context, and it is recommended as a starting point for exploration of the topic.) These experiments demonstrated the existence of such mechanisms, explored their parameters, and showed that most of them could be modified through adaptation to altered stimulus conditions.

When humans turn the head from left to right, the image projected on the retinas moves in the direction opposite to the head movement. Without the head turning, such an image displacement would appear as something moving; but when it is correlated with the turning of the head, no movement of the environment is seen. However, what if the image were to move in coordination with the head movement, but the extent of that movement were less (or more) than would be usual for the head movement in question? Would the anomaly be noticed?

Wallach and Kravitz devised a mechanical apparatus that enabled head movements to cause displacements of an image by any desired percentage of the extent of that head movement, and discovered that subjects could detect deviations of as little as 2% from the normal degree of displacement. This showed that a highly accurate compensating process corrects for the image displacement that normally accompanies a head movement, thus yielding an appearance of stability. Wallach called this process constancy of visual direction (CVD), and he noted with interest that it could be easily modified through perceptual adaptation. To demonstrate this, Wallach & Kravitz set the apparatus so that during head movements the visual image moved by 150% of what would be the normal displacement, and had subjects turn their heads back and forth watching this altered displacement for 10 minutes. After this brief adaptation period, subjects were shown an objectively stationary target as they turned their heads. They reported that it no longer appeared motionless, but swung back and forth in the direction opposite the movements that had occurred during adaptation, In order to make the target appear stationary, the apparatus had to be set so that the target actually moved by about 14% in the same direction it had moved during the adaptation period. The CVD process that correlates head movements and image shifts had been modified by exposure to an abnormal stimulus condition. (The adaptation of the CVD process was temporary and dissipated after a few minutes.)

As in the case of depth and distance perception, Wallach's finding that the constancy of visual direction adapts readily when stimulus conditions are altered represented a marked departure from the Gestalt tradition, which focused on innate and unmodifiable processes. In fact, Wallach came to regard adaptation as an analytical tool in itself. For example, Wallach & Bacon were able to demonstrate that two distinct processes are involved in the constancy of visual direction by showing that they adapt differently.

In addition to the processes compensating for image displacements during head rotation, Wallach and various collaborators examined other sorts of compensations related to perceptual stability during bodily movement, including displacements caused by nodding and by eye movements, the changing orientation of objects as one walks past, optical expansion caused by moving forward, displacement in a dimension unrelated to the physical movement, and movement-correlated alterations in form perception.

== Teaching and impact on students ==
Because he spent his career actively teaching at a liberal arts college, Wallach's legacy includes his influence on the students and research assistants with whom he worked. Many of these went on to make their own contributions to psychology: Harris provides a partial list, including John M. Darley, Sheldon Ebenholz, William Epstein, Irwin Feinberg, Charles S. Harris, John C. Hay, Eric G. Heinemann, Richard Held, Julian Hochberg, Lloyd Kaufman, Jean Matter Mandler, Jacob Nachmias, Ulric Neisser, Ann O’Leary, Rose R. Olver, Dean Peabody, Mary C. Potter, Judith L. Rapoport, Robert A. Rescorla, Daniel Riesberg, Lance J. Rips, Irvin Rock, Fred Stollnitz, Davida Y. Teller, Lise Wallach (no relation), Michael Wertheimer, and Carl Zuckerman.

Wallach was a beloved figure on the Swarthmore campus, not least for his colorful personal manner. In a retrospective article published in 2002, the Swarthmore College Bulletin described him in this way:

Wallach firmly established his reputation for brilliant scholarship and an inspirational, decidedly eccentric style. He drove a jalopy and called people "darling". He chain smoked during his seminars, often getting so immersed in thought that he would hold his Camels as they burned to the ends. And he paced. "You could go to Hans with a question", says his former student and colleague Dean Peabody III ’49. "He’d pace in his office, into the hall, and disappear. Then, he might come back in a half hour".

Another former student, Charles S. Harris, described a characteristic incident:

Once, for example, he strode into our seminar room apparently deep in thought, then turned around and walked back out. We could hear him pacing up and down the hallway. Finally, he returned and apologized. "I've been struggling to solve a puzzle", he explained. "I know it's not our topic for today, but I hope you can help me". He laid out the perceptual problem, and we all did our best to work out a solution. Some years later, I told him I was perplexed about that incident because I had since learned that he had solved that puzzle in an article he had published a year earlier. With a broad grin he replied, "Yes, I know".

== Distinctions and awards ==
- 1948 John Simon Guggenheim Memorial Fellow
- 1954-55 Member, Institute for Advanced Study at Princeton
- 1971 Centennial Professor of Psychology, Swarthmore College
- 1983 American Psychological Association Award for Distinguished Scientific Contributions
- 1986 Member, National Academy of Sciences
- 1987 Howard Crosby Warren Medal of the Society of Experimental Psychologists
- 1989 William James Fellow of the American Psychological Society
