= Renzo Canestrari =

Italian psychiatrist (1924–2017)

Renzo Antonio Bartolomeo Canestrari (19 August 1924 in Piagge, Italy – 28 January 2017 in Bologna, Italy) was an Italian psychiatrist. A student of Giulio Cesare Pupilli and Cesare Musatti, he was one of the foremost pioneers in the rebirth of Italian psychology after World War II, as well as the founder of the Bologna School of Gestalt Psychology and the guiding force behind it for 40 years.

In 1957 he became professor of general psychology at the University of Salerno, then - from 1960 on - the first full professor of clinical psychology at the University of Bologna. One of his main interests was perception under the Gestalt theoretical point of view and its impact on mental health. Well ahead of his time, he spoke out on the need to include psychology in the medical school curriculum.

Among Canestrari's students were several of Italy's most influential Gestalt psychologists of the following decades, e.g. Anna Arfelli Galli, Giuseppe Galli, Mario Fame, Paolo Bonaiuto, Alberto Ranzi, Pietro Tampieri, Giuliana Giovanelli, Giancarlo Trombini, Vincenzo Faenza, Augusto Palmonari and Gabriella Bartoli. These researchers, experts in a variety of fields of science and research, became known as the Bologna School of Gestalt Psychology.

From 1979 to his death, Canestrari was a member of the Advisory Board of the international multidisciplinary journal Gestalt Theory. In 1991 he founded the Dipartimento della Formazione of the University of the Republic of San Marino.

== Publications (selected) ==
- 1974 Guida alla psicologia. Firenze.
- 1975 (with Giancarlo Trombini) Psychotherapie als Umstrukturierung des Feldes. In: Ertel u. Kemmler (Hrsg.), Gestalttheorie in der modernen Psychologie, Darmstadt, ISBN 3-7985-0400-8, S. 266–273.
- 1978: Psicologia fuori programma. Bologna.
- 1986 Psicologia generale e dello sviluppo. Bologna, ISBN 88-8091-223-2.
- 1993 Freud e la ricerca psicologica. A cura di Renzo Canestrari e Pio E. Ricci Bitti. Bologna: Il Mulino. ISBN
- 1994 (with Antonio Godino) Manuale di psicologia. Bologna, ISBN 88-8091-584-3.
- 1995 La percezione. Bologna, ISBN 88-8091-239-9.
- 1996 Some reflections on ideology and scientific research. European Review, 4(2), April 1996, pp 97–106.
- 2002 Itinerari del ciclo della vita. Adolescenza, mezza età, vecchiaia, Bologna, ISBN 88-491-1989-5.
- 2010 Gestalt Psychology in my Scientific Training and at the Start of the School of Bologna. Gestalt Theory 32(1), 79–84.
