= Barberpole illusion =

Visual illusion

An example of the barberpole illusion. The grating is actually drifting downwards and to the right at 45 degrees, but its motion is captured by the elongated axis of the aperture.

The barberpole illusion is a visual illusion that reveals biases in the processing of visual motion in the human brain. This visual illusion occurs when a diagonally striped pole is rotated around its vertical axis (horizontally), it appears as though the stripes are moving in the direction of its vertical axis (downwards in the case of the animation to the right) rather than around it.

== History ==
The barber's pole is commonly found outside barber shops.

In 1929, psychologist J.P. Guilford informally noted a paradox in the perceived motion of stripes on a rotating barber pole. The barber pole turns in place on its vertical axis, but the stripes appear to move upwards rather than turning with the pole. Guilford tentatively attributed the phenomenon to eye movements, but acknowledged the absence of data on the question.

In 1935, Hans Wallach published a comprehensive series of experiments related to this topic, but since the article was in German it was not immediately known to English-speaking researchers. An English summary of the research was published in 1976 and a complete English translation of the 1935 paper was published by Sophie Wuerger, Robert Shapley, and Nava Rubin in 1996. Wallach's analysis focused on the interaction between the terminal points of the diagonal lines and the implicit aperture created by the edges of the pole.

== Explanation ==
In this example the motion of the grating is identical to that in example 1, but the aperture is isotropic.

This illusion occurs because a bar or contour within a frame of reference provides ambiguous information about its "real" direction of movement. The actual motion of the line has many possibilities. The shape of the aperture thus tends to determine the perceived direction of motion for an otherwise identically moving contour. A vertically elongated aperture makes vertical motion dominant whereas a horizontally elongated aperture makes horizontal motion dominant. In the case of a circular or square aperture, the perceived direction of movement is usually orthogonal to the orientation of the stripes (diagonal, in this case). The perceived direction of movement relates to the termination of the line's end points within the inside border of the occluder. The vertical aperture, for instance, has longer edges at the vertical orientation, creating a larger number of terminators unambiguously moving vertically. This stronger motion signal forces us to perceive vertical motion. Functionally, this mechanism has evolved to ensure that we perceive a moving pattern as a rigid surface moving in one direction.

Individual motion-sensitive neurons in the visual system have only limited information, as they see only a small portion of the visual field (a situation referred to as the "aperture problem"). In the absence of additional information the visual system prefers the slowest possible motion: i.e., motion orthogonal to the moving line. The neurons which may correspond to perceiving barber-pole-like patterns have been identified in the visual cortex of ferrets.

== Auditory analogue ==
A similar effect occurs in the Shepard's tone, which is an auditory illusion.

== See also ==
- Screw (simple machine) – screws convert rotational motion to linear motion and exhibit the same mechanic
- Motion perception
- Auditory illusion
