= Orciano =

Orciano may refer to:

- Orciano di Pesaro, a commune in the province of Pesaro e Urbino, Italy
- Orciano Pisano, a commune in the province of Pisa, Italy
