= Giuseppe Galli (psychologist) =

Giuseppe Galli (February 24, 1933 in Ravenna, Italy – September 9, 2016 in Macerata, Italy) was an Italian physician and psychologist. He was Full Professor of General Psychology at the University of Macerata from 1982 to 2009.

After completing his medical studies at the University of Bologna, a short study visit to Austria and a specialist training in endocrinology at the University of Florence, Giuseppe Galli turned from 1960 to Gestalt psychology, mentored by Renzo Canestrari at the University of Bologna. From 1966 Giuseppe Galli taught psychology at the University of Macerata, from 1982 as a Full Professor for General Psychology, a position which he held until his retirement in 2009.

Galli's main research interests were the phenomenology of the ego, personality psychology and the psychology of social virtues, as well as hermeneutics and intersemiotics (transferring the meaning from one sign system to another, e.g. from the picture into a text) In a large number of his contributions he devoted himself to applying Gestalt psychology in the field of psychotherapy, being viewed as an authoritative representative of Gestalt Theoretical Psychotherapy.

From 1979, Galli was on the advisory board of the international multidisciplinary journal Gestalt Theory (De Gruyter). In 2007, he became an honorary member of the International Society for Gestalt Theory and its Applications (GTA)

Giuseppe Galli was married to the developmental psychologist Anna Arfelli Galli (September 19, 1933 - May 1, 2019), also a professor at the University of Macerata and of Gestalt psychological orientation.

== Selected publications ==
[See also full text links on: Giuseppe Galli Page of The Society for Gestalt Theory and its Applications (GTA)]

- 1997: Psicologia del corpo. Fenomenologia ed ermeneutica. Bologna: CLUEB. ISBN 9788880914488. German edition 1998: Psychologie des Körpers. Phänomenologie und Hermeneutik. Wien: Boehlau. ISBN 9783205989295.
- 1999: Psicologia delle virtù sociali. Bologna: CLUEB. ISBN 9788849111880. German edition 1999, 2005 (extended): Psychologie der sozialen Tugenden. Wien: Boehlau. ISBN 9783205773085
- 2000: On the Dynamics of Multi-disciplinary Working Groups. In: F. G. Wallner & G. Fleck (eds), Science, Humanities, and Mysticism: Complementary Perspectives, 67–71, Wien: Braumueller. ISBN 9783700312888.
- 2003: Field Structures of Social Virtues, Gestalt Theory, 25, 158 -164.
- 2003: Introduzione alla psicologia fenomenologico-ermeneutica. Morlacchi Editore. ISBN 9788888778150.
- 2005: Hope and Dedication to research in Freud’s letters to Fliess, Gestalt Theory, 27, 50–56.
- 2004: The role of parts in inter-semiotic transposition. Arnheim's analysis of Michelangelo's creation of Adam, Gestalt Theory, 26, 122–127.
- 2007: Relations and Structures - Gestalt theory as a theory of phenomenal relations, Gestalt Theory, 29, 206–212.
- 2010 (ed.): Gestaltpsychologie und Person. Wien: Krammer Verlag. ISBN 9783901811432. Italian Edition 1910: La persona in relazione. Sviluppi della psicologia della Gestalt. Liguori Editore. ISBN 9788820748456.
- 2017: Der Mensch als Mit-Mensch. Herausgegeben und eingeleitet von Gerhard Stemberger. Wien: Krammer Verlag. ISBN 9783901811753.
