= Hans-Jürgen Walter =

German psychologist (born 1944)

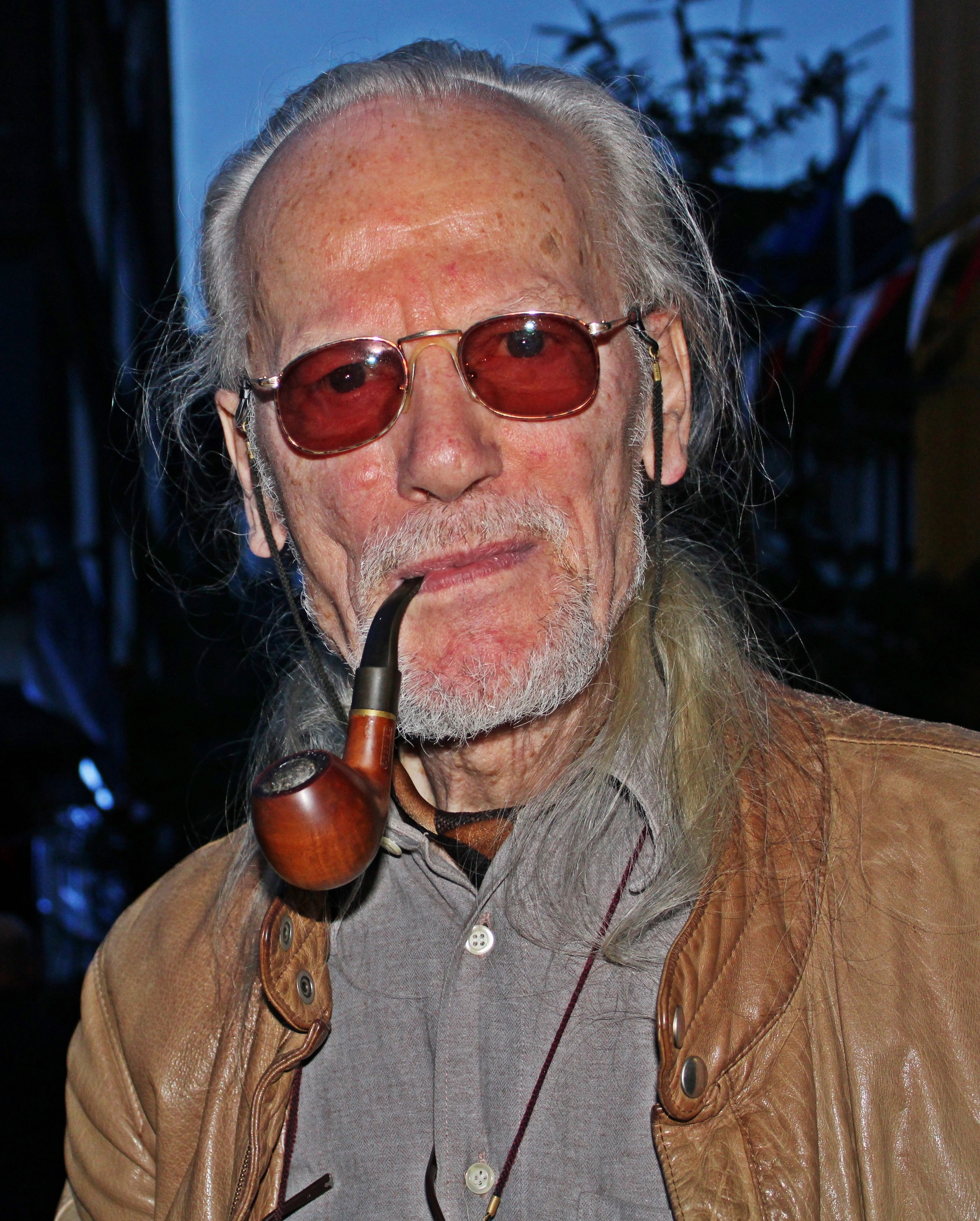
Hans-Jürgen Walter (2019)

Hans-Jürgen P. Walter (born 25 March 1944 in Gladenbach-Weidenhausen, Germany) is a German psychologist and psychotherapist known as one of the main founders of Gestalt Theoretical Psychotherapy. Walter studied psychology with the German Gestalt psychologists Edwin Rausch and Friedrich Hoeth, eminent representatives of the second and third generation of Gestalt theory in Germany. Gestalt Theoretical Psychotherapy GTP spread as a psychotherapeutic method in the German-speaking countries, being officially accredited as an independent scientific psychotherapy method in Austria.

== Life and study ==
Between 1965 and 1971 Hans-Jürgen Walter studied psychology and German studies in Marburg and Frankfurt, Germany. In 1977 he earned his doctorate in Darmstadt with a thesis on Die Gestalttheorie als wissenschaftliche Grundlage psychotherapeutischer Praxis und ihre Beziehung zu psychotherapeutischen Ansaetzen der Gegenwart ("The Gestalt theory as a scientific base for psychotherapy practice and its relation to contemporary approaches in psychotherapy"). This thesis shows that Gestalt theory can provide an appropriate framework to integrate the methods and merits of many other psychotherapeutic schools, especially the analytic and the humanistic ones. This work has appeared in 1994 in its third and enlarged edition under the title Gestalt Theorie und Psychotherapy. Zur integrativen Anwendung zeitgenoessischer Therapieformen ("Gestalt Theory and Psychotherapy: an integrative approach to contemporary forms of psychotherapy"). It is considered the first basic text for Gestalt Theoretical Psychotherapy in its contemporary form.

Walter held a teaching position for Gestalt Theoretical Psychotherapy at the University of Vienna and at several psychotherapy institutes in Germany and Austria. In 1999 he was appointed honorary chairman of the international Society for Gestalt Theory and its Applications (GTA). He has been one of the editors of the international multidisciplinary journal Gestalt Theory (Sciendo, De Gruyter), and is now a member of its Founders and Honorary Board.

== History ==
Many years of intensive pursuit of theoretical and practical evaluation of several psychotherapeutical approaches preceded Walter's formation and development of Gestalt Theoretical Psychotherapy. Before him, other well-known representatives of Gestalt psychology of the Berlin school, especially in the U.S.A. (for example Erwin Levy, Abraham S. Luchins, Erika Oppenheimer-Fromm, Molly Harrower, Junius F. Brown and other students of Kurt Lewin) had stated their opinions and elaborated theoretically and practically on applying Gestalt theory to psychotherapeutic problems. Walter, however, earned recognition for being the first to generally, originally and stringently use the theoretical and practical possibilities of Gestalt theory to formulate a consistent and encompassing Gestalt theoretical approach to psychotherapy. In addition to this, he also argued that it was possible to use Gestalt theoretical principles in order to develop and extend the Gestalt therapy of Fritz Perls, which Gestalt Theoretical Psychotherapy is related, but not identical, to.

One of the most striking characteristics of Gestalt Theoretical Psychotherapy is the key role of the epistemological grounding position of Gestalt theory (critical realism) and its consideration in all fundamental, theoretical and practical problems in psychotherapy. In Gestalt Theoretical Psychotherapy this is closely bound up with the basic methodological approach (holistic, phenomenological, experimental) of Gestalt theory, its system theoretical approach, its specific psychophysical and psychological approach. Walter has started to bring all of these approaches together, as well as the long and rich tradition of Gestalt theoretical experimental research.

== Works ==
- Hans-Jürgen P. Walter: Gestalttheorie und Psychotherapie (Gestalt theory and psychotherapy). Westdeutscher Verlag: Opladen 1994 (3. Auflage).
- Hans-Jürgen P. Walter: Angewandte Gestalttheorie in Psychotherapie und Psychohygiene (Applied Gestalt theory in psychotherapy and psychohygiene). Westdeutscher Verlag: Opladen 1996.
- Entry about life and work of Hans-Jürgen P. Walter in: G. Stumm, A. Pritz (Hrsg.), Personenlexikon der Psychotherapie, Springer: Vienna 2003
