= Gerhard Stemberger =

Gerhard Stemberger (born June 29, 1947, in Innsbruck, Austria) is a sociologist and Gestalt psychologist in Vienna, Austria, and one of the main representatives of Gestalt Theoretical Psychotherapy.

After a career in sociological and psychological working time research, Stemberger turned to clinical psychology and psychotherapy. He has published extensively in the fields of clinical applications of Gestalt psychology, key concepts of Gestalt Theoretical Psychotherapy, ethics in psychotherapy, and history of Gestalt theory. He is co-editor (executive editor 2000–2012) of the international multidisciplinary journal "Gestalt Theory" (de Gruyter) and of the journal "Phänomenal - Zeitschrift für Gestalttheoretische Psychotherapie" (Krammer). He is faculty member of the Austrian Association for Gestalt Theoretical Psychotherapy (ÖAGP). 1999-2007 he was president of the international Society for Gestalt Theory and its Applications (GTA). 1992-2011 he served as an expert member of the Psychotherapy Advisory Council of the Austrian Federal Ministry for Health. Stemberger is living in Vienna (Austria) and Berlin (Germany).

Stemberger has edited and published five important Gestalt psychological anthologies: The first appeared in 2002 and contains classical and contemporary Gestalt psychological contributions to psychopathology ("Psychische Störungen im Ich-Welt-Verhältnis"). The second, published in 2017, is a collection of works of the Italian Gestalt psychologist Giuseppe Galli ("Der Mensch als Mit-Mensch"). The third appeared in 2018, a collection of works of the German Gestalt psychologist, sports psychologist and lucid dreams researcher Paul Tholey ("Gestalttheorie von Sport, Klartraum und Bewusstsein"). The fourth, co-edited with Marianne Soff (Karlsruhe, Germany), was published in 2022: it is the revised and expanded third edition of Gestalt psychologist Wolfgang Metzger's fundamental work "Schöpferische Freiheit - Gestalttheorie des Lebendigen" (Creative Freedom - Gestalt theory of the living). The fifth, finally, is the anthology "Essentials of Gestalt Theoretical Psychotherapy", published in 2022, offering for the first time in English an insight into the guiding ideas of this integrative psychotherapy method, authored by psychotherapists from Austria, Germany, Italy, and the United States. In 2024 Stemberger published a further anthology, "Grundkonzepte der Gestalttheoretischen Psychotherapie" (Basic Concepts of Gestalt Theoretical Psychotherapy), a comprehensive presentation of the practice and theory of this Gestalt psychological approach to psychotherapy, with contributions from authors from Austria, Germany and Italy.
