= Giuseppe Galli =

Giuseppe Galli may refer to:

- Giuseppe Galli (composer) (fl. 1598), Italian composer of the Baroque period
- Giuseppe Galli (psychologist) (1933–2016), Italian physician and psychologist
- Giuseppe Galli Bibiena (1696–1757), Italian designer
