= Vera Felicidade de Almeida Campos =

Brazilian psychologist

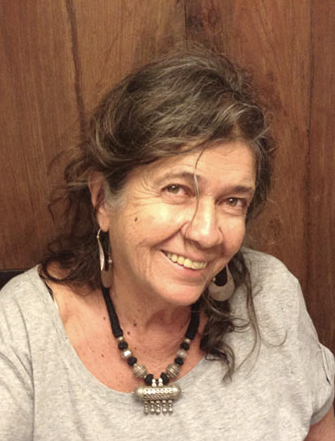
- Campos c. 2018
- Born: August 18, 1942 (age 84); Irará, Bahia, Brazil
- Education: Federal University of Rio de Janeiro (Psychology, 1968)
- Known for: Founder of Gestalt Psychotherapy; researcher on perception; concepts of man-in-the-world is a gestalt, psychological life is perceptive life, changing perception changes behavior, to perceive is to know, the human being is a possibility of relationship
- Scientific career
- Fields: Paychotherapy, Gestalt Psychology
- Website: www.verafelicidade.com

Vera Felicidade de Almeida Campos (born August 18, 1942) is a Brazilian psychologist who founded Gestalt Psychotherapy, a psychotherapeutic theory based on Gestalt Psychology. From gestalt and phenomenology she developed a clinical practice and a theory that supports it, breaking with psychoanalytic concepts that influence most other approaches to clinical psychology, even gestalt approaches.

Gestalt Psychotherapy, a term coined by Campos to name her theory, is different from Gestalt Therapy (developed by Fritz Perls). The difference is in the methodology as well as in the theoretical basis, especially regarding the unconscious, (Note: According to Campos, Perls, who was trained in psychoanalysis before dedicating himself to Gestalt, maintained in Gestalt Therapy, concepts of psychoanalytic theory such as the unconscious. Campos, Vera Felicidade de Almeida in Gestalt Psychotherapy (in Portuguese)) a concept accepted by F. Perls and denied by V. Campos. The clinical practice is individual and based on dialogue between psychotherapist and client. Her eleven books expose the development of the theory's concepts, such as: to perceive is to know; psychological life is perceptive life; (Note: The concept of perception is central to Campos' work, in her words: "When we say that perception is the experiential unit, we are saying that all psychological, behavioral life results from how one perceives the world, the other, and oneself..." – Campos, Vera Felicidade de Almeida. (1993) Terra e Ouro são Iguais – Percepção em Psicoterapia Gestaltista [Earth and Gold are Equal – Perception in Gestalt Psychotherapy], p. 72, ISBN 857110249X) (Note: The author's entire work expresses her research on perception, and as she herself states: "Psychological life is perceptive life. Perception is the process that structures and characterizes the relation of the Being-in-the-world. Psychological life is perceptual life is a statement that is not restricted only to men, that is, psychological life is as broad as biological life, or organic life." – Campos, Vera Felicidade de Almeida. (2002). A Questão do Ser, do Si mesmo e do Eu [The Question of Being, the Self and the I], p. 23 ISBN 8573162732) the human being is a possibility of relationship; (Note: The possibility of relationship is another fundamental concept in Campos theory. In her own words: "The possibility of establishing relations is a condition, a capacity of being, of the individual man, animal or plant. This condition, aptitude, results from biological/neurological configurations..." – Campos, Vera Felicidade de Almeida. (2002). , chapter: "Possibilidade de Relacionamento" ["Possibility of Relationship"], p. 33 ISBN 8573162732) non-acceptance; autoreferencing etc.

== Biography ==
Vera Felicidade A. Campos was born in the small town of Irará in the state of Bahia, Brazil. She is the first daughter of the couple Aristeu Nogueira (Note: Vera Felicidade de Almeida Campos is quoted in a thesis defended at the Federal University of Bahia on the work of her father Aristeu Nogueira Campos http://www.cult.ufba.br/arquivos/monografia_marcos.pdf – She is the first daughter of Aristeu Nogueira Campos and sister of Diógenes de Almeida Campos) Campos and Odete de Almeida Campos, and at the age of three, the family moved to the capital, Salvador, where she grew up, studied and started her university education, remaining in the city until the age of eighteen. She graduated in psychology in Rio de Janeiro, and since then has been dedicated mainly to clinical practice and the development of Gestalt Psychotherapy theory as presented in her published books.

== Creation of Gestalt Psychotherapy ==
In the first book, published shortly after graduation at the Federal University of Rio de Janeiro (UFRJ), Campos writes about her dissatisfaction with existing theories in the field of Clinical Psychology. (Note: The author says clearly in one of her interviews: "When I was studying psychology, in '64, psychoanalysis didn't answer and didn't satisfy the questions about the human, to the extent that it seemed to me a totally literary thing, which was based on the construct of the unconscious. The question of the unconscious did not allow for any proof except by itself. For this, my philosophical background of Materialism, Dialectical Materialism, and my great preoccupation with Epistemology had a lot of influence. So, I kept trying to find answers to what the human being was, until, in 1970, I managed to answer this question and wrote a book." – Campos's interview, May 16, 1988, statement given to journalist Rosane Santana – Rosane Santana (May 16, 1988). "Relacionamento Trajetória do Humano" [Relationship – Human Trajectory]. Jornal A Tarde – via Vera Felicidade website.) She had work experience in psychiatric hospitals in Brazil (Juliano Moreira Hospital) and courses in Moscow at the Department of Medicine of the Patrice Lumumba University (The Peoples' Friendship University of Russia) in 1962, and due to her philosophical background and interest in theory studies, (Note: The Regional Council of Psychology – CRP (the regulatory body of the psychology profession in Brazil) in 2012 published a reporting about Vera Felicidade de Almeida Campos, her intellectual background, the time at the Patrice Lumumba University in Moscow, and at the Federal University of Rio de Janeiro, as well as the work creating her theory – Gestalt Psychotherapy – and publishing specialized books, the working period at the Juliano Moreira psychiatric hospital, along with private psychotherapy clinic, and teaching. "Autêntica Plenitude" ["Authentic Plenitude"]. Magazine of CRP-3. Edition 8. April–June 2012 (in Portuguese).) she has always had an epistemological concern making clear in her writings the inconsistencies and contradictions of authors who intend to develop a psychotherapy based on Gestalt Psychology, but continue assuming concepts from the psychoanalytic theoretical matrix. For V. Campos, the visions of man implicit in psychoanalysis (Freud) and in Gestalt Psychology are incompatible. Based on the research of Gestalt Psychology theorists, Koffka, Koehler and Wertheimer, especially their research on perception and sensation, laws of perception, and isomorphism, Campos started her theoretical reflections towards the development of Gestalt Psychotherapy. Another important topic of her studies was Kurt Lewin's research on Field Theory, and from that she was critical of what she calls the dualistic approach (Note: Betty Malin, when discussing dualism in psychology, quotes Vera Felicidade de Almeida Campos as a successful author in facing the question of dualism. Malin, Betty (March 2010). "Por que Fisicalismo?" [Why physicalism?]. Revista Litteris (in Portuguese). 4. Federal University of Rio de Janeiro. ISSN 1983-7429.) and the Class Theory-based approach (Lewin's concept), which are characteristic of psychoanalysis, behaviorism, and other functionalist schools in psychology.

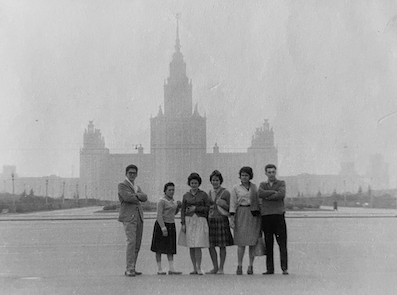
Vera Felicidade Almeida Campos (second from right) with colleagues at the Patrice Lumumba Russian University in Moscow, 1962

The German Gestaltists centered their careers in research and theoretical development of Gestalt Psychology, but did not develop a psychotherapy, and that was a concern for V. Campos. Since the beginning of her clinical practice, benefiting from both Gestalt concepts and Edmund Husserl's Phenomenology, she initiated the development of Gestalt Psychotherapy, (Note: The importance of the first book, which is a book of conceptualizations, is expressed in this statement by the author: "There was a series of concepts from Psychoanalysis, "Freudian slip", for example, which was explained by the unconscious, which the Law of Proximity can explain; association of ideas, which Freud and Jung took a long time working with, can be explained by Proximity, Good Form, Continuity – laws of perception. But my main concern was with conceptualizations. From there I wrote the first book, which is the foundation of all my work, where I define what the human being is, (...) my view is quite phenomenological, but with a divergence from Phenomenology, because it takes structure into consideration." – Campos, Vera Felicidade de Almeida (1988). "Relacionamento Trajetória do Humano" [Relationship – Human Trajectory]. A Tarde (in Portuguese). Bahia, Brazil – via verafelicidade.com.) a theory based exclusively on gestaltism, phenomenology, and dialectical materialism. At no time does she make use of psychoanalytic concepts, as does, for instance, Fritz Perls' Gestalt Therapy. One of the ideas most combated by Campos, because it is the most widespread not only in psychology but also in several other areas of knowledge, is the idea of the existence of the unconscious. Campos always points out that the concept of the unconscious in Freud's work is the heart of psychoanalysis, and It is regarded as a fundamental concept with implications in the approach and way of thinking about man, his psychism and his behaviour. With the great dissemination of psychoanalysis after World War II, this was one of its most widespread concepts not only in the human sciences but for the lay public, the common sense. V. Campos, since her first book, expresses her denial of the unconscious in a chapter titled "O Mito do Inconsciente" ("The Myth of the Unconscious").

Campos works in clinical psychology since the late 1960s and has been consistently developing her theory in books, articles, and research reports for decades. At the Federal University of Bahia (UFBA) she taught Extension Courses in Gestalt Psychotherapy in the beginning of the eighties and from that time on the subject "Vera Felicidade's Gestalt Psychotherapy" is part of the program content of the mandatory discipline Psychological Theories and Systems II at the Psychology Institute of UFBA (IPS). Besides this subject, in this same Institute of Psychology, it was created in 1998 the optional discipline "Vera Felicidade's Gestalt Psychotherapy" (approved by Brazilian Ministry of Education and Culture – MEC). From her first book published in 1972 to the most recent ones, several of them are cataloged in the Library of Congress in Washington (USA) and other public libraries. Her books are also found in Libraries of American Universities (Yale and Harvard), as well as in Libraries of Brazilian Universities (University of Brasilia – UnB and others) and in the National Library (Rio de Janeiro). In addition to books, she regularly publishes articles in magazines and journals.

== Selected publications ==
=== Books ===
- Psicoterapia Gestaltista – Conceituações. Edição da Autora, Rio de Janeiro-RJ, 1972
- Mudança e Psicoterapia Gestaltista. Zahar Editores, Rio de Janeiro-RJ, 1978
- Individualidade, Questionamento e Psicoterapia Gestaltista. Editora Alhambra, Rio de Janeiro-RJ, 1983
- Relacionamento – Trajetória do Humano. Edição da Autora, Salvador-BA, 1988
- Terra e Ouro são Iguais – Percepção em Psicoterapia Gestaltista. Jorge Zahar Editor, Rio de Janeiro-RJ, 1993
- Desespero e Maldade – Estudos Perceptivos – Relação Figura/Fundo. Edição da Autora, Salvador-BA, 1999
- A Questão do Ser, do Si Mesmo e do Eu. Relume Dumará, Rio de Janeiro – RJ, 2002
- Mãe Stella de Oxóssi – Perfil de uma Liderança Religiosa. Jorge Zahar Editor, Rio de Janeiro-RJ, 2003
- A realidade da ilusão, a ilusão da realidade. Relume Dumará, Rio de Janeiro – RJ, 2004
- Linguagem e Psicoterapia Gestaltista – Como se Aprende a Falar. Ideias & Letras, São Paulo – SP, 2015
- Como Perceber e Transformar a Neurose – Psicoterapia Gestaltista. Labrador Universitário, São Paulo - SP, 2017
- Como Perceber e Transformar a Neurose – Psicoterapia Gestaltista - eBook. Simplíssimo, Porto Alegre-RS, 2017
- Autismo em Perspectiva na Psicoterapia Gestaltista. Ideias & Letras, São Paulo - SP, 2024
- Emparedados pelo Vazio - Bem-estar e Mal-estar Contemporâneos. Labrador, São Paulo-SP, 2025
- Tudo é relacional - Causalidade nada explica. Labrador, São Paulo, 2025
- Ciladas da sobrevivência - Círculo vicioso abismal. Labrador, São Paulo, 2026

=== Papers ===
- Campos, Vera Felicidade de Almeida (1994). "Paixão e Razão – Vivência e Significado" [Passion and Reason – Experience and Meaning]. BOCA BILINGUE (in Portuguese). Portugal – via verafelicidade.com.
- Campos, Vera Felicidade de Almeida (2012). "Criação, questões e soluções da Psicoterapia Gestaltista" [Creation, Questions and Solutions of Gestalt Psychotherapy]. Revista E-PSI (in Portuguese). Portugal.
- Campos, Vera Felicidade de Almeida (2006). "Vontade, Desejo e Psicoterapia Gestaltista" [Will, desire and Gestalt Psychotherapy]. SBEM Boletim da Sociedade Brasileira de Endocrinologia e Metabologia – via verafelicidade.com.
- Campos, Vera Felicidade de Almeida (1999). "Sexualidade Humana – aspectos psicológicos" [Human Sexuality – psychological aspects]. SBEM Boletim da Sociedade Brasileira de Endocrinologia e Metabologia (in Portuguese) – via verafelicidade.com.
- Campos, Vera Felicidade de Almeida (2001). "Dependência, hábito e medo" [Dependency, habit, and fear]. SBEM Boletim da Sociedade Brasileira de Endocrinologia e Metabologia (in Portuguese) – via verafelicidade.com.
- Campos, Vera Felicidade de Almeida (1999). "Doença: onipotência e indisciplina" [Disease, Omnipotence, and Indiscipline]. SBEM Boletim da Sociedade Brasileira de Endocrinologia e Metabologia (in Portuguese) – via verafelicidade.com.
- Campos, Vera Felicidade de Almeida (2002). "Drogas" [Addiction and Drugs]. SBEM Boletim da Sociedade Brasileira de Endocrinologia e Metabologia (in Portuguese) – via verafelicidade.com.
- Campos, Vera Felicidade de Almeida (2000). "Impotência é a integração de limites" [Impotence is the integration of limits]. SBEM Boletim da Sociedade Brasileira de Endocrinologia e Metabologia (in Portuguese) – via verafelicidade.com.
- Campos, Vera Felicidade de Almeida (2000). "Sobre a morte – Realidade e cogitação" [On death – reality and cogitation]. SBEM Boletim da Sociedade Brasileira de Endocrinologia e Metabologia (in Portuguese) – via verafelicidade.com.
- Campos, Vera Felicidade de Almeida (2000). "Vergonha e síndrome de pânico" [Shame and panic disorder]. SBEM Boletim da Sociedade Brasileira de Endocrinologia e Metabologia (in Portuguese) – via verafelicidade.com.
