= Mutatesia Leonelli =

- Died: 1662
- Occupations: Lawyer, Poet
- Works: le Rime Varie; Serie d ' Epigrammi gravi, morati e giocosi; Gli Avvenimenti Amorosi di Venere con Adone
- Title: Treasurer of the Pontifical Chambers – (Appointed by Pope Urban VIII)
- Parents: Giulio Leonelli (father); Virginia Leonelli née Fornari (mother)
- Family: Innocenzo Leonelli, Ignatius of Jesus – (born Carlo Leonelli), and three sisters

Mutatesia Leonelli (died 1662) was a lawyer and later appointed Treasurer Pontifical Chambers by Pope Urban VIII. He was also a poet, publishing three works throughout his lifetime. With the exception of a short period of financial hardship which resulted in a brief excommunication, he led a successful life at the Papal Court. He was the older brother of Innocenzo Leonelli and the Discalced Carmelite missionary Ignatius of Jesus.

== Works ==
- Mutatesia Leonelli (1644). le Rime Varie. Bologna.
- Mutatesia Leonelli (1653). Serie d'Epigrammi gravi, morati e giocosi. Rome.
- Mutatesia Leonelli. Gli Avvenimenti Amorosi di Venere con Adone.

== Bibliography ==
- Gargano, Sebastiano (1868). Manuale statistico amministrativo storico ed artistico della provincia di Pesaro e Urbino [Statistical and historical administrative manual of the province of Pesaro and Urbino]. Pesaro: Nobili.
- Lupieri, Edmondo F. (1 December 2003). "Friar of Ignatius of Jesus (Carlo Leonelli) and the First Scholarly book on Mandaeaism (1652)". ARAM Periodical. 16. Peeters Publishers: 25–46. doi:10.2143/aram.16.0.504670.
- Augusto Vernarecci (1872). Dizionario biografico degli nomini illustri di Fossombrone [Biographical dictionary of the illustrious names of Fossombrone]. Monacelli.
