= Giulio Leonelli =

Italian civil lawyer

- Died: 1614
- Occupation: Lawyer
- Title: Governor of Turin
- Spouse: Virginia Fornari
- Children: Mutatesia Leonelli, Innocenzo Leonelli, Ignatius of Jesus – (born Carlo Leonelli), and three daughters

Giulio Leonelli (died 1614) was a civil lawyer who, along with several other men, founded a library in Rome which housed more than forty-thousand works. He was appointed as Governor of Turin by the Duke of Savoy and later was "appointed by the Court of Rome to the main offices of the Marca, then of Umbria, and finally Avignon."

He married Virginia Fornari and they had six children: three daughters, one a nun; and three sons – Mutatesia Leonelli; Innocenzo Leonelli; Carlo Leonelli, later known as Ignatius of Jesus.

== Bibliography ==
- Henry Barnard, ed. (1870). "American Journal of Education". 20 (4). London: Office of American Journal of Education.
- Gargano, Sebastiano (1868). Manuale statistico amministrativo storico ed artistico della provincia di Pesaro e Urbino [Statistical and historical administrative manual of the province of Pesaro and Urbino]. Pesaro: Nobili.
- Augusto Vernarecci (1903). Fossombrone dai tempi antichissimi ai nostri con illustrazioni e appendice di documenti [Fossombrone from ancient times to ours with illustrations and appendix of documents]. Forni.
