= Terre Roveresche =

Comune in Marche, Italy

- Comune
- Comune di Terre Roveresche
- Location within Italy Location within Marche
- Coordinates: 43°41′20″N 12°57′56″E
- Country: Italy
- Region: Marche
- Province: Pesaro and Urbino (PU)

Government
  - Mayor: Antonio Sebastianelli

Area
  - Total: 70.37 km^{2} (27.17 sq mi)

Population (1 January 2017)
  - Total: 5,335
  - Density: 75.81/km^{2} (196.4/sq mi)
- Demonym(s): Barchiesi, Orcianesi, Piaggesi, Sangiorgesi
- Time zone: UTC+1 (CET)
  - Summer (DST): UTC+2 (CEST)
- Postal code: 62038
- Dialing code: 0721
- Patron saint: St. Paschal Baylon
- Saint day: 17 May
- Website: Official website

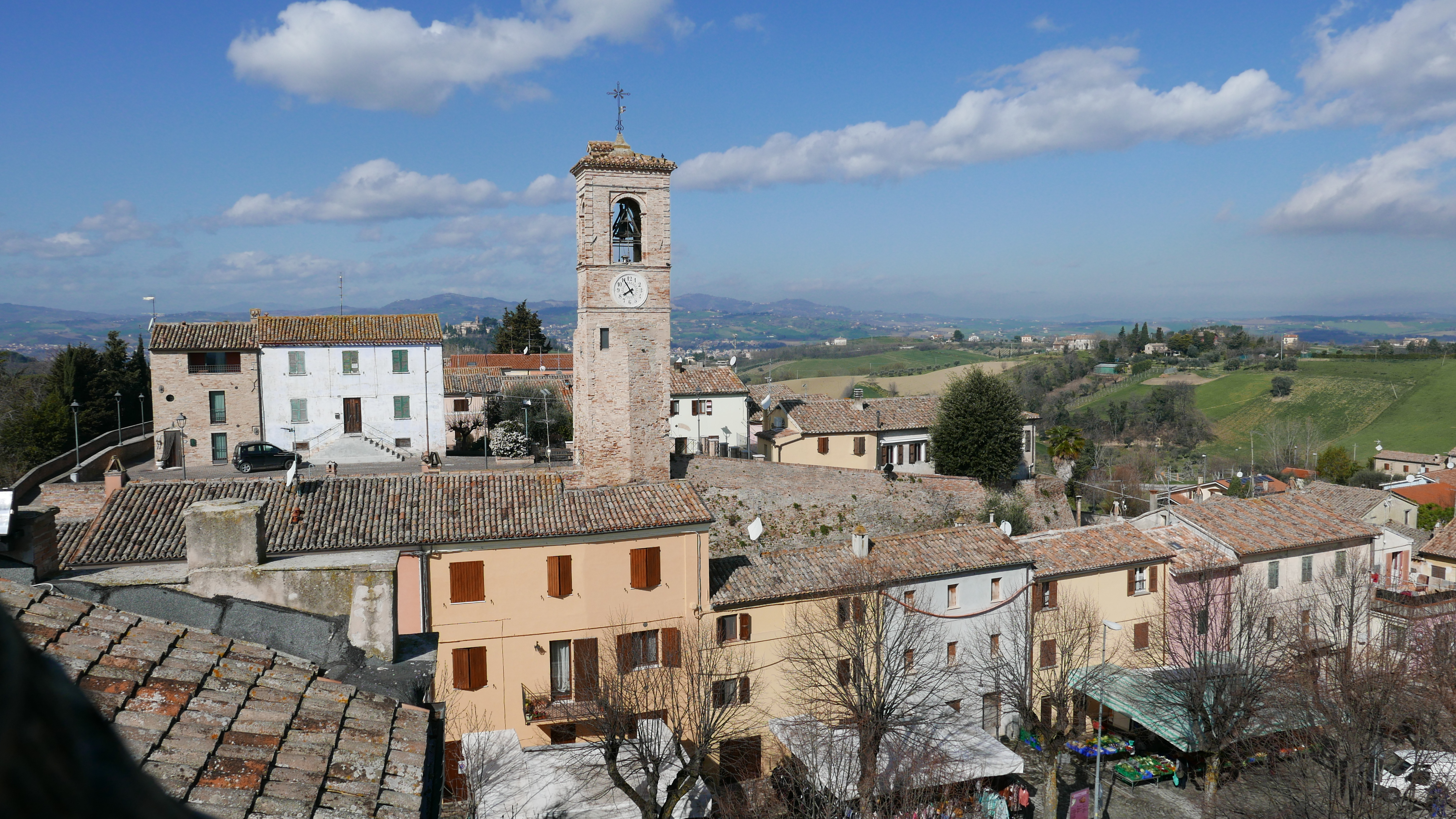
Historic Centre of Piagge, Terre Roveresche

Terre Roveresche is a comune (municipality) in the Province of Pesaro and Urbino in the Italian region of Marche.

It was established on 1 January 2017 by the merger of Barchi, Orciano di Pesaro, Piagge and San Giorgio di Pesaro.
