= Gestalt theoretical psychotherapy =

Type of psychotherapy

Gestalt Theoretical Psychotherapy (GTP) is a method of psychotherapy based strictly on Gestalt psychology. Its origins go back to the 1920s when Gestalt psychology founder Max Wertheimer, Kurt Lewin and their colleagues and students started to apply the holistic and systems theoretical Gestalt psychology concepts in the field of psychopathology and clinical psychology. Through holism, "a person's thinking, feeling, actions, perceptions, attitudes and logical operations" are seen as one unity. Many developments in psychotherapy in the following decades drew from these early beginnings, like e.g. group psychoanalysis (S. Foulkes), Gestalt therapy (Laura Perls, Fritz Perls, Goodman, and others), or Katathym-imaginative Psychotherapy (Hanscarl Leuner).

== History ==
In Europe Gestalt theoretical psychotherapy in its own right has been initiated and formulated on this basis by the German Gestalt psychologists and psychotherapists Hans-Jürgen P. Walter, Rainer Kästl and their colleagues in Germany and Austria. Walter, a student of Gestalt psychologist Friedrich Hoeth, was influenced to form the core of his theoretical concept on the basis of the work of Gestalt theorists Max Wertheimer, Wolfgang Köhler, Kurt Koffka, Kurt Lewin, and Wolfgang Metzger. Walter's first publication on Gestalt theoretical psychotherapy came out in 1977 Gestalttheorie und Psychotherapie (Gestalt Theory and Psychotherapy), which is now on its third edition (1994). The majority of the extensive literature on Gestalt theoretical psychotherapy which has been published in the decades since then is in the German language. However, in 2021, the international multidisciplinary journal "Gestalt Theory" published an issue focusing on Gestalt Theoretical Psychotherapy, offering a series of articles in English on the essentials of this method, and in 2022 Gerhard Stemberger - in the last decades the most prolific author of this method - published the anthology "Essentials of Gestalt Theoretical Psychotherapy", which contains this series in a revised and expanded form and supplemented by additional contributions. In 2024 Stemberger published the anthology "Grundkonzepte der Gestalttheoretischen Psychotherapie" (Basic Concepts of Gestalt Theoretical Psychotherapy), a comprehensive presentation of the practice and theory of this Gestalt psychological approach to psychotherapy, with contributions from authors from Austria, Germany and Italy.

Gestalt Theoretical Psychotherapy in this form has gained popularity predominately in German speaking countries. It is officially approved by the Austrian government as a scientific psychotherapy method under the Austrian Psychotherapy Act.

== Gestalt psychology ==
GTP bases its theoretical presumptions not only on "partial theses" and "partial findings" of Gestalt psychology, but also on the "overall system" of Gestalt Theory of the Berlin School featuring Wertheimer, Kohler, Koffka, Lewin, and others. Wolfgang Metzger and Paul Tholey identify five sub-approaches of the Gestalt Theory, which, relating to each other, form up an organized system. Gestalt Psychology can be presented as a:

1. Methodology offering a "holistic view and experimental orientation.”
2. Phenomenology providing "a wealth of research-backed knowledge about Gestalt phenomena in perception and cognition, behaviour and life processes, including social relations."
3. Theory of dynamic processes "from productive thought to the psychology of will and social life."
4. Psychophysical approach "including the working hypothesis of isomorphism."
5. Epistemological approach of "critical realism.”

== Description ==
One of the most striking characteristics of Gestalt Theoretical Psychotherapy is the key role of the epistemological grounding position of Gestalt theory (critical realism) and its applicability to the fundamental, theoretical, and practical problems in psychotherapy. In Gestalt Theoretical Psychotherapy this is closely bound up with the basic methodological approach (holistic, phenomenological, experimental) of Gestalt theory, its system theoretical approach, and its specific psychophysical and psychological approach.

Gerhard Stemberger's Diagnostics in Gestalt Theoretical Psychotherapy, provides insight into the concept and process of Gestalt theoretical psychotherapy. The Gestalt theoretical psychotherapy therapeutic process is a relationship between two individuals in which both the therapist and client develop an egalitarian attitude. An egalitarian attitude is the concept that everyone is equal. The diagnostic process and the therapeutic process are inseparable to Gestalt theoretical psychotherapists. The therapist should act as a “fellow voyager” of the client, supporting them in discovering their specific and personal feelings and problems. Gestalt theoretical psychotherapists believe that an individual cannot be forced into doing things against the individual's nature; therefore, the therapist must adapt diagnostic exploration to the individual's capabilities.

In GTP, the client investigates their experience through logical reasoning and their senses. Stemberger points out that whatever one discovers relates to “not only to what is descriptively encountered in the experience, such as what is seen, heard, felt, and sensed, but also to what is thought, imagined, remembered, and planned.” Referring to Kurt Lewin, a change can only arise if the therapist raises full awareness to the “dynamic properties” of the client's current psychological situation. Consequently, it is vital in GTP that the client faces their fears “here and now,” processing their experience with proper support and intervention.

The therapeutic process requires no strict or set schedule, and the speed of the process varies for each individual. “Force-field analysis,” a concept from Lewin, is a phenomenological procedure in which the therapist and client look for opportunities to explore specific attributes of the client's life space, their driving forces, and barriers. This can occur in therapy through dialogue, allowing the client to experience their feelings through speaking. The anthropological model in Gestalt theoretical psychotherapy is the belief that the therapist should not only focus on ‘inner components’ of the client, but also focus on the interaction between the client and their environment that effect their experience and behavior. The client directs his overall attention to the presence, listening inside themselves, remaining conscious, following whatever appears in the current state. Only then can the therapist focus their questions and involvement on the client's analyses of the situation.

=== Critical Realism ===
Critical Realism assumes a distinction between the physical and phenomenal world. First developed by Köhler, Koffka and Metzger, it was improved by Norbert Bischof and Paul Tholey. Gestalt theory takes, from an ontological perspective, a “monistic position” on a mental and physical problem, supporting the holistic theory. From a metaphysical perspective, it takes a “dualistic position” distinguishing between the “trans-phenomenal world” and the “phenomenal world.” The divergence between physical facts and perception was proved by Wertheimer, who investigated the relationship between the organization of the geographical and phenomenal fields.

=== The trans-phenomenal world ===
The trans-phenomenal world considers “the macrocosm of the physical world and all physical objects and physical organisms embedded therein.” It is trans-phenomenal as people cannot directly access it – it is theorized or constructed. Whatever one hypothesizes, says, or establishes about the trans-phenomenal world comes from interpreting data acquired using phenomenal methods, theoretical forms and models. The data obtained constitutes the “critical-phenomenal view,” through which each individual has their own “microcosmic phenomenal world” seen by them as reality.

=== The phenomenal world ===
The phenomenal world is the “internal perceptual world of conscious experience,” i.e., a copy of the external world of objective reality constructed in the brain based on the depiction derived from the retina. Illustratively, the phenomenal world individuals face is not an actual world but a copy of the external world generated by the brain. As discussed by Tholey, physical stimuli reach our physical senses and enter our brains through neural pathways into the cerebral cortex. Köhler used the term "psychophysical level", at which the stimuli transform, resulting in a psychological experience.

=== Isomorphism ===
Köhler, recognizing the contributions of Wertheimer and Koffka, designed the “isomorphism assumption,” suggesting a uniformity between physical and physiological operations and psychological processes. Isomorphism indicates that for every experienced phenomenon, there is a corresponding set of brain processes. The assumption portrays why individuals can move in the perceived environment and interact with it, including other individuals with regards to their needs.

=== Force-field theory ===
Critical realism suggests that phenomenal worlds of individuals vary and different experiences arise. Lewin developed the "force-field theory", in which these phenomenal worlds are “field events.” Notably, an individual's behaviour relies on “field forces between the person and the environment.” Through this interaction, the world's objects can have positive or negative characters on a person, caused by various “attracting or repulsive forces.” The attracting forces attract an individual to an object while opposing forces repulse from it. The force-field theory is crucial in GTP as it underpins the understanding of variations across perceptions of situations, providing the foundation for interpreting situations and interactions.

== Critical Realism in psychotherapeutic relationships ==
Referring to critical realism, Stemberger describes two situations in a psychotherapeutic relationship. First of all, there is a connection or experience arising in a psychotherapist's phenomenal world. Secondly, there is the client's perception of the therapeutic relation or situation. There is space for a mutual exchange between both sides through the egalitarian attitude about their shared experience. Both parties can experience psychotherapy differently; thus, critical realism enables the psychotherapist to look at their encounter and assess the therapeutic relationship and situation critically, contributing to an open, straightforward conversation and collective coordination. This protects the client from the therapists' potential dominance and the therapist from being influenced by illusions of control and power.

== The empty-chair technique ==
GTP proposes “experience-centred interventions”, such as the empty chair technique, through which the client faces direct contact with their direct experience. The client imagines someone with whom they have experienced conflict sitting on the chair. The person then speaks to the chair, sharing their emotions and feelings. After that, the client takes the role of the person sitting, responding to the words they said previously. Consequently, the person empathizes with the other side by coming across their feelings. This enables clients to process their struggles by approaching their situation from a broader perspective.

The empty-chair technique and some other "experience-centred interventions" were adopted from Gestalt therapy.

The technique does not imply that the client's direct experience is not affected by ideas or concepts. Stemberger discusses: "all own explanations for the relationship in the world belong to the critical-phenomenal world, ... all beliefs, convictions and ideologies, including all related problems, doubts and pricks of consciences." For that reason, GTP should evaluate the extent to which beliefs and theories may affect the client's perception, a judgement of the experience, and behaviour. That being the case, the therapist can diagnose the patient with minimized bias.

== Criticism ==
The Gestalt Therapy developed by Fritz Perls received criticizing views from many academic Gestalt psychology representatives, mainly from Mary Henle. Gestalt theoretical psychotherapy is related to but different from Fritz Perls' Gestalt therapy in its theoretical foundation. Mary Henle has pointed out the differences between Gestalt theory in its original sense and the Perls'ian understanding of Gestalt. With her analysis however, she restricts herself explicitly to only three of Perls' books from 1969 and 1972, leaving out Perls' earlier work, and Gestalt therapy in general as a psychotherapy method. It must also be mentioned that Gestalt theoretical psychotherapy adopts techniques from Gestalt therapy as well as from other psychotherapy methods as Walter points out. This corresponds to the conviction in Gestalt theoretical psychotherapy that techniques and working methods from other therapy methods can be integrated into Gestalt theoretical psychotherapy as long as they are compatible with the Gestalt psychological approach and are interpreted and handled according to the basic Gestalt psychological concepts.
