= Laws of association =

Laws of association in Aristotle's psychology. Impressions are stored in the seat of perception, linked by the laws of similarity, contrast, and contiguity.

In psychology, the principal laws of association are contiguity, repetition, attention, pleasure-pain, and similarity. The basic laws were formulated by Aristotle in approximately 300 B.C. and by John Locke in the seventeenth century. Both philosophers taught that the mind at birth is a blank slate and that all knowledge has to be acquired by learning. The laws they taught still make up the backbone of modern learning theory.
