= Innocenzo Leonelli =

Italian soldier and hermit

Venerable Innocenzo Leonelli
- Born: 1592
- Died: April 1625 (aged 32–33); Brescia
- Other name: Tiburzio Lazzari
- Occupations: soldier, hermit
- Parents: Giulio Leonelli (father); Virginia Leonelli née Fornari (mother)
- Family: Mutatesia Leonelli, Ignatius of Jesus (born Carlo Leonelli), and three sisters

Innocenzo Leonelli (1592 – April 1625), also called "the hermit of Maddalena", was a soldier whose fierce religiosity led him to vow to fight only enemies of the Catholic faith. He was the son of a "wealthy and semi-noble family". His father, Giulio Leonelli, was a well-respected lawyer and onetime governor of Turin. His brothers were Mutatesia Leonelli, who was appointed as treasurer of the pontifical chambers by Pope Urban VIII, and the Discalced Carmelite missionary Ignatius of Jesus.

He first fought in Lombardy, and later, in 1617, he served his faith by fighting Protestants (Note: See Counter-Reformation and Thirty Years' War) in Bohemia and Hungary. (Note: See Bohemian Revolt) In 1620 or 1622, after returning from his campaigns, he gave his wealth to the poor and renounced his name; seeking peace, he cloistered himself in the hermitage of Santa Maria Maddalena in Brescia, taking the name of Tiburzio Lazzari. He spent his time with the sick and destitute, providing them with conversation and consolation, and would leave the hermitage only to go begging for alms.

The life of a hermit sapped his health, and he fell gravely ill. The wealthy of Brescia offered him succour in their palaces but he refused them. Rather, he asked to be taken to a hospital to die among the same people he had previously ministered to. Following his death in April 1625, the faithful considered him so holy the Bishop of Brescia had to protect his body from those wanting it for relics. The Bishop later convened a trial to examine his life and works, and thereafter Leonelli was referred to as venerable.

Two years after his death, the regents of the hospital re-buried him in a tomb of fine marble. The tomb was relocated in 1733 as part of the restoration and improvements made to the temple of Santa Lucia at that time.
