= San Giorgio di Pesaro =

- Frazione
- Location of San Giorgio di Pesaro in Italy
- Coordinates: 43°43′N 12°59′E
- Country: Italy
- Region: Marche
- Province: Pesaro e Urbino (PU)
- Comune: Terre Roveresche

Area
  - Total: 20.9 km^{2} (8.1 sq mi)
- Elevation: 201 m (659 ft)

Population (31 August 2010)
  - Total: 1,435
  - Density: 68.7/km^{2} (178/sq mi)
- Demonym: Sangiorgesi
- Time zone: UTC+1 (CET)
  - Summer (DST): UTC+2 (CEST)
- Postal code: 61030
- Dialing code: 0721

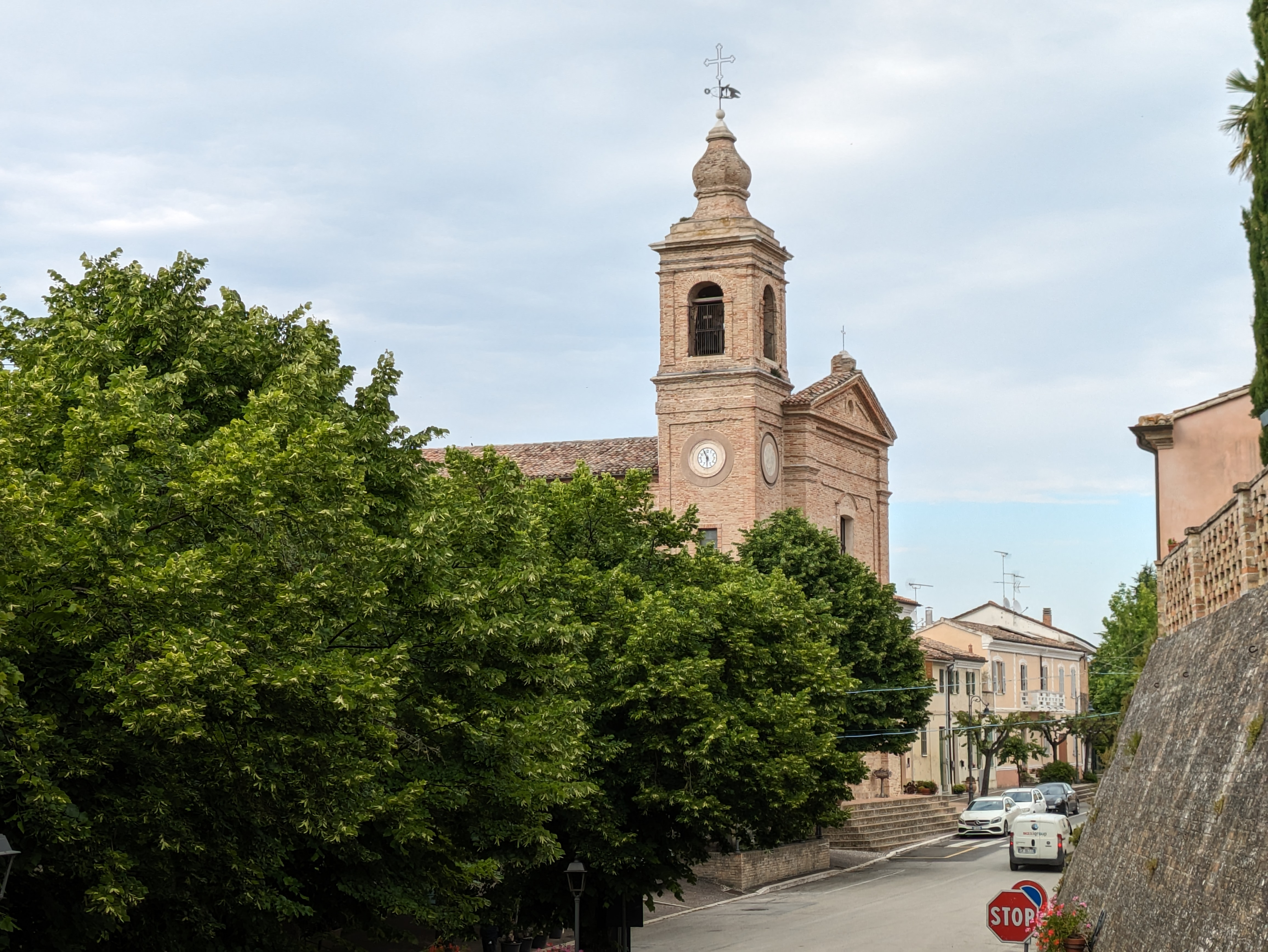

San Giorgio di Pesaro frazione of Terre Roveresche, in the Province of Pesaro e Urbino in the Italian region Marche. It was a separate comune until 2017.
