= Orciano di Pesaro =

- Frazione
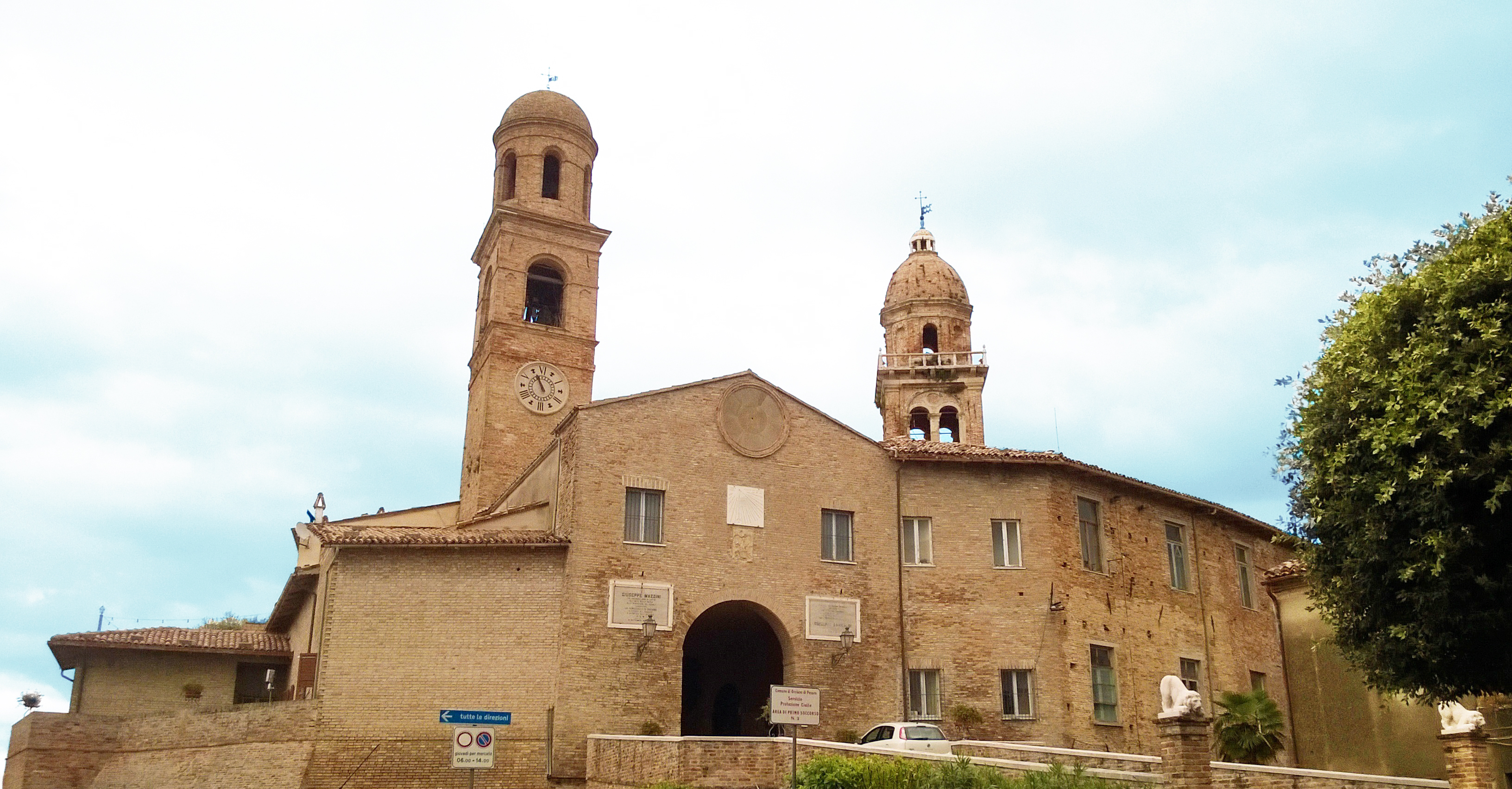

- Location of Orciano di Pesaro in Italy
- Coordinates: 43°41′19.93″N 12°57′55.80″E
- Country: Italy
- Region: Marche
- Province: Pesaro e Urbino (PU)
- Comune: Terre Roveresche

Area
  - Total: 23.8 km^{2} (9.2 sq mi)
- Elevation: 264 m (866 ft)

Population (28 February 2009)
  - Total: 2,205
  - Density: 92.6/km^{2} (240/sq mi)
- Demonym: Orcianesi
- Time zone: UTC+1 (CET)
  - Summer (DST): UTC+2 (CEST)
- Postal code: 61038
- Dialing code: 0721

Orciano di Pesaro is a frazione of the comune of Terre Roveresche in the Province of Pesaro e Urbino in the Italian region Marche, located about 45 kilometres (28 mi) west of Ancona and about 25 kilometres (16 mi) south of Pesaro. It is located on a hill dividing the valleys of the Metauro and Cesano rivers. It was a separate comune until 2017.

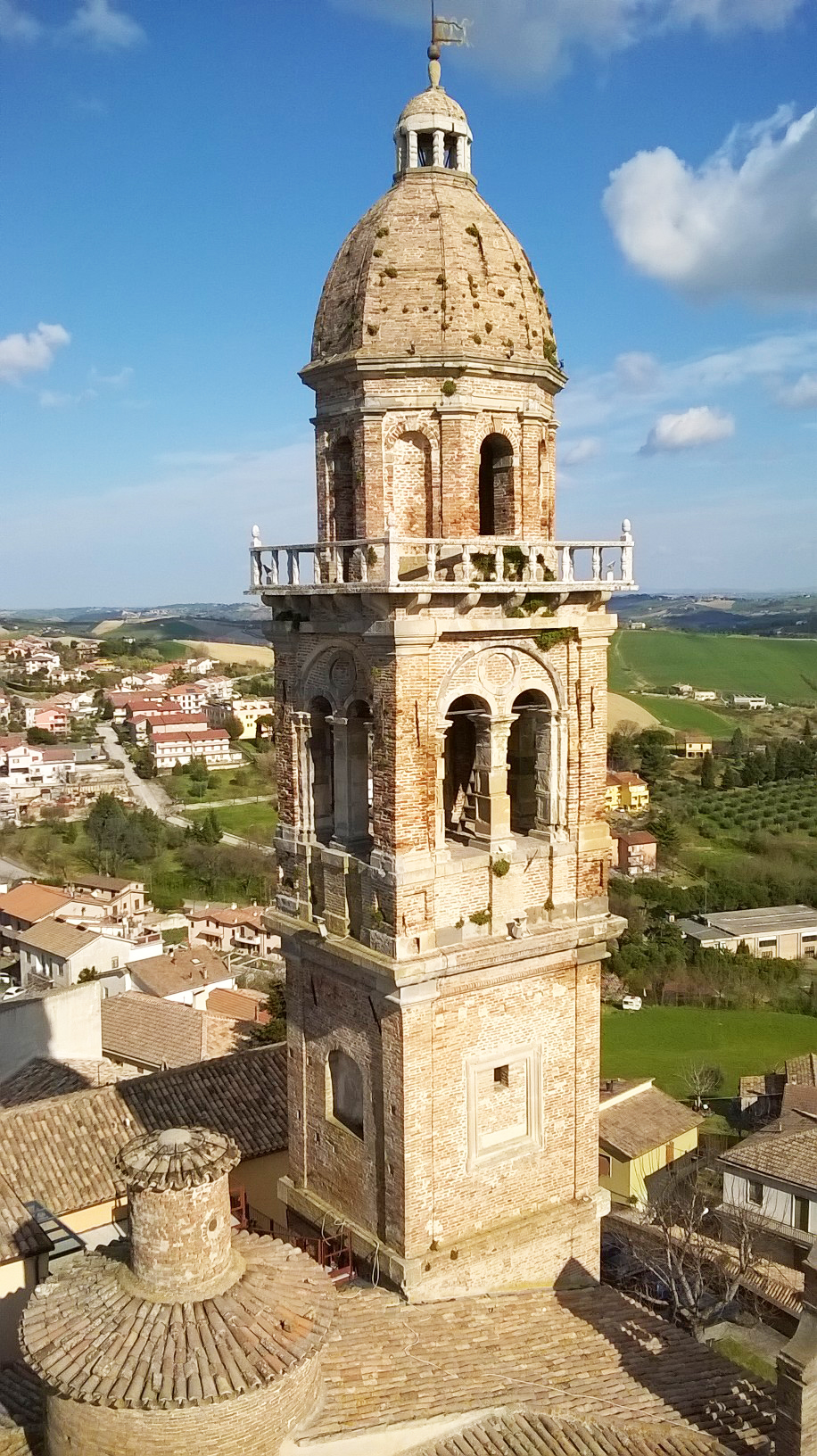
Orciano di Pesaro as viewed from the bell tower of the Torre Malatestiana
