= Barchi, Marche =

Barchi
- Frazione
- Location of Barchi in Italy
- Coordinates: 43°40′N 12°56′E
- Country: Italy
- Region: Marche
- Province: Pesaro e Urbino (PU)
- Comune: Terre Roveresche

Area
  - Total: 17.3 km^{2} (6.7 sq mi)
- Elevation: 319 m (1,047 ft)

Population (1 January 2016)
  - Total: 967
  - Density: 55.9/km^{2} (145/sq mi)
- Demonym: Barchiesi
- Time zone: UTC+1 (CET)
  - Summer (DST): UTC+2 (CEST)
- Postal code: 61030
- Dialing code: 0721

Barchi is a frazione of the comune of Terre Rovereschea in the Province of Pesaro e Urbino in the Italian region Marche, located about 45 km west of Ancona and about 30 km south of Pesaro. It was a separate comune until 2017.
