= Piagge =

- Frazione
- Location of Piagge in Italy
- Coordinates: 43°44′N 12°58′E
- Country: Italy
- Region: Marche
- Province: Province of Pesaro e Urbino (PU)
- Comune: Terre Roveresche

Area
  - Total: 8.6 km^{2} (3.3 sq mi)

Population (Dec. 2010)
  - Total: 1,029
  - Density: 120/km^{2} (310/sq mi)
- Time zone: UTC+1 (CET)
  - Summer (DST): UTC+2 (CEST)
- Postal code: 61030
- Dialing code: 0721

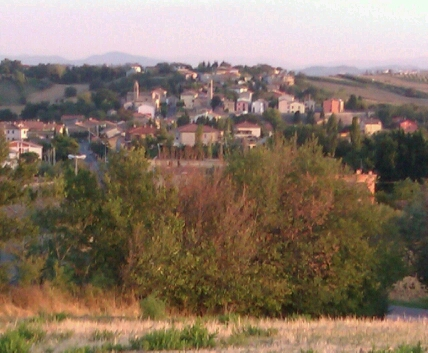
Panorama of Piagge seen from Monte S. Giovanni

Piagge is a frazione of Terre Roveresche in the Province of Pesaro e Urbino in the Italian region Marche, located about 45 kilometres (28 mi) northwest of Ancona and about 20 kilometres (12 mi) south of Pesaro. It was a separate commune until 2017.
