= Isomorphism (Gestalt psychology) =

The term isomorphism literally means sameness (iso) of form (morphism). In Gestalt psychology, Isomorphism is the idea that perception and the underlying physiological representation are similar because of related Gestalt qualities. Isomorphism refers to a correspondence between a stimulus array and the brain state created by that stimulus, and is based on the idea that the objective brain processes underlying and correlated with particular phenomenological experiences functionally have the same form and structure as those subjective experiences.

Isomorphism can also be described as the similarity in the gestalt patterning of a stimulus and the activity in the brain while perceiving the stimulus. More generally, this concept is an expression of the materialist view that the properties of mind and consciousness are a direct consequence of the electrochemical interactions within the physical brain.

A commonly used example of isomorphism is the phi phenomenon, in which a row of lights flashing in sequence creates the illusion of motion. It is argued that the brain state created by this stimulus matches the brain state created by a patch of light moving from one location to another. The stimulus is perceived as motion because the subjective percept of spatial structure is correlated with electric fields in the brain whose spatial pattern mirrors the spatial structure in the perceived world.
