= Sophie Wuerger =

British Color perception researcher (1960-2024)

- Born: 1960
- Died: 3 January 2024 (age 63)
- Education: University of Regensburg, New York University
- Occupations: Professor, scientist

Sophie Wuerger (1960 – January 3, 2024) was a color perception researcher and psychology professor at the University of Liverpool.

== Biography ==
Wuerger was born in 1960. She earned a degree in Experimental Psychology from the University of Regensburg in Germany. She obtained her PhD from New York University (NYU) in 1991, advised by Michael Landy and John Krauskopf. Wuerger then completed two postdoc positions, at NYU and the Institute of Ophthalmology, before becoming a lecturer at the University of Keele. In 2003, she moved to the University of Liverpool, and received a personal chair there in 2013, becoming a professor. Overall, she advised more than 13 PhD students and 15 research fellows. At Liverpool, she led the Psychology Department's Clinical and Cognitive Neuroscience group. She was additionally an honorary professor at the University of Science & Technology, Liaoning in Anshan, China.

Wuerger's research specialty was the neural representation of color space models. During her NYU postdoc, she showed that the geometry of color space did not fit a simple Euclidean model. In a later work, she showed that color signals from the retina must undergo a non-linear translation in the brain. She then focused on changes to color perception related to aging, showing that while color signals change, color perception remains largely constant. Wuerger used both modeling methods and applied work via fMRI and EEG scans during her work. In 2020, Wuerger and her collaborators touched on American politics in their work when they analyzed Donald Trump's skin color from publicly available images. They found that Trump's tan was most consistent with a sunless skin tan, and a viral 2020 Twitter image purporting to show his tan line was likely digitally distorted. Wuerger has also worked on multisensory perception, with recent work on how smell impacts color perception.

Wuerger's professional service included helping to organize the International Color Association (AIC) 2013 meeting, the European Conference on Visual Perception in 2015, and alternated organizing Colour Group meetings. She served on the editorial boards of Perception, Multisensory Perception, and Vision Research. She volunteered to help organize the second Women in Vision UK meeting in 2018. In 2023, she was invited to deliver the Palmer Lecture to the Colour Group (GB).

== Personal life ==
Wuerger's husband was Georg Meyer: they had two children together, Charlotte and Henry. Wuerger died while undergoing cancer treatments.
