= Robert Shapley =

American neurophysiologist

Robert Shapley is an American neurophysiologist, the Natalie Clews Spencer Professor of the Sciences at New York University, a professor in the Center for Neural Science and an associate member of the Courant Institute of Mathematical Sciences.

Shapley received an A.B. Degree from Harvard College (1965) and a Ph.D. from Rockefeller University (1970). With a Helen Hay Whitney Postdoctoral Fellowship, he went to Northwestern University and the University of Cambridge. He served on the US National Research Council's Committee on Vision. He graduated from Harvard University, and from Rockefeller University with a PhD in neurophysiology and biophysics. In 1986 he received a MacArthur Foundation Prize Fellowship from the MacArthur Fellows Program.

== Academic work ==
Among Shapley's findings were his discoveries about the X and Y retinal ganglion cells in the cat retina. He discovered that the Y cell collected excitatory signals from many small spatial mechanisms called "nonlinear subunits" and that there was a contrast gain control, a nonlinear feedback within the retina that adjusted the signal-transfer properties of the retina contingent on the space-averaged stimulus contrast.

He also worked with the visual system of macaque monkeys, and found: its parallel processing of visual signals; the nature of retinal computation of color; and that the orientation-selectivity of neurons in the primary visual cortex, or V1, of evolves with time. Other findings that have elucidated the workings of V1 include the following: V1 cells are tuned for color and for spatial pattern; fluctuations in the local field potential in V1 appear to be caused by noise and have no autocoherence or phase-memory over time; and there is not a single fixed cortical receptive field for each neuron.

More recently, he has been studying how color is represented in the visual cortex, as a follow-up to his earlier work on parallel pathways for color and brightness contrast in the retina. He has been examining visual perception and the art of painting—he wrote an editorial in the journal Perception about the work of the American artist Ellsworth Kelly.

== Works ==
- Contrast Sensitivity, Volume 5, Editors Robert Shapley, Dominic Man-Kit Lam, MIT Press, 1993, ISBN 978-0-262-19339-9
- "Introduction", Advances in photoreception: proceedings of a Symposium on Frontiers of Visual Science, National Academies Press, 1990, ISBN 978-0-309-04240-6
- "The Role of Insight in Perceptual Learning: Evidence from Illusory Contour Perception", Editors Manfred Fahle, Tomaso Poggio, MIT Press, 2002, ISBN 978-0-262-06221-3
- "The Receptive Fields of Visual Neurons", Seeing, Editor Karen K. De Valois, Academic Press, 2000, ISBN 978-0-12-443760-9
