= Ignatius of Jesus =

17th-century Italian Roman Catholic friar

Father Ignatius of Jesus
- Ignàzio di Gesù
- Born: 1596; Sorbolongo, Pesaro
- Died: 21 February 1667 (aged 70–71); Rome
- Occupations: Friar and missionary
- Years active: 1629–1664
- Known for: Writings on Mandaeism and the Persian language

Ecclesiastical career
- Religion: Christianity
- Church: Roman Catholic Church
- Ordained: 27 February 1623
- Writings: Narratio originis, rituum, & errorum christianorum Sancti Ioannis (1652); Grammatica linguae persicae (1661)

Ignatius of Jesus (Italian: Ignàzio di Gesù, born Carlo Leonelli; 1596, Sorbolongo, Pesaro – 21 February 1667, Rome) was an Italian Roman Catholic friar of the Order of the Discalced Carmelites who served as a missionary in Persia, Basra, and Lebanon for 35 years. He is best known for writing the first Western scholarly work on Mandaeism, Narratio originis, rituum, & errorum christianorum Sancti Ioannis ("Narration of the Origin, the Rituals, and the Errors of the Christians of St. John"; 1652).

== Biography ==
1596, Carlo Leonelli was born as the fifth of sixth siblings to a semi-noble family in Sorbolongo.

He joined the Discalced Carmelites (also known as the "Barefoot" Carmelites) and took his vows on 27 February 1623, receiving the name of Ignatius of Jesus.

He spent 35 years from 1629 to 1664 as a missionary in the Middle East in the following locations.

- 1629–1634: Isfahan
- 1634–1641: Shiraz
- 1641–1652: Basra
- 1652–1664: Lebanon

He died in Rome on 21 February 1667.

== Works ==
Ignatius of Jesus is best known for his 1652 treatise on Mandaeism, Narratio originis, rituum, & errorum christianorum Sancti Ioannis ("Narration of the Origin, the Rituals, and the Errors of the Christians of St. John").

His other works include Grammatica linguae persicae (1661), a grammar of the Persian language.

== See also ==
- Jean-Baptiste Tavernier
