= Candigliano =

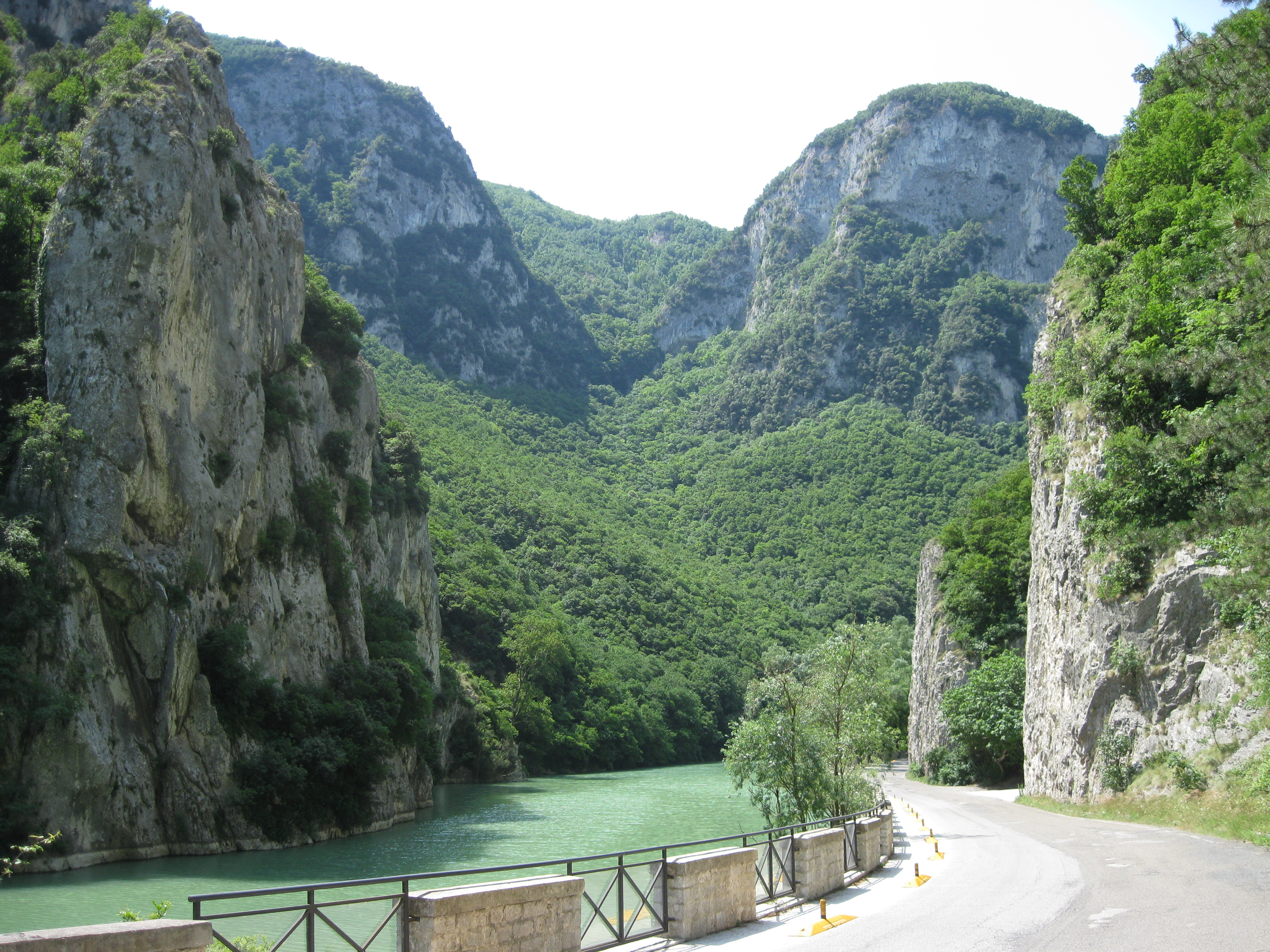
- The Candigliano at Furlo Pass

Location
- Country: Italy

Physical characteristics
- Source
  - location: Appennino Umbro-Marchigiano mountains
  - elevation: 978 m (3,209 ft)
- Mouth: Metauro
  - coordinates: 43.6744°N 12.7541°E
- Length: 60 km (37 mi)
- Discharge
  - average: 13 m^{3}/s (460 cu ft/s)

Basin features
- Progression: Metauro→ Adriatic Sea

The Candigliano is a river in the Marche and Umbria regions of Italy. Its source is in the Appennino Umbro-Marchigiano mountains in the province of Pesaro e Urbino near the border with the province of Perugia. The river flows east and forms the border between Pesaro e Urbino and Perugia for a short distance south of Mercatello sul Metauro before entering Pesaro e Urbino. It then continues flowing east past an exclave called Monte Ruperto belonging to Città di Castello and then past Piobbico, where it is joined by the Biscubio. The river is joined by the Burano at Acqualagna and flows northeast near the Furlo Pass until it joins the Metauro west of Fossombrone.
