= Montemaggiore =

Montemaggiore may refer to several places:

Italy

- Montemaggiore Belsito
- Montemaggiore al Metauro
- Monte Maggiore (Foggia)

France

- Montemaggiore, Corsica
