= Acqualagna =

- Comune
- Comune di Acqualagna
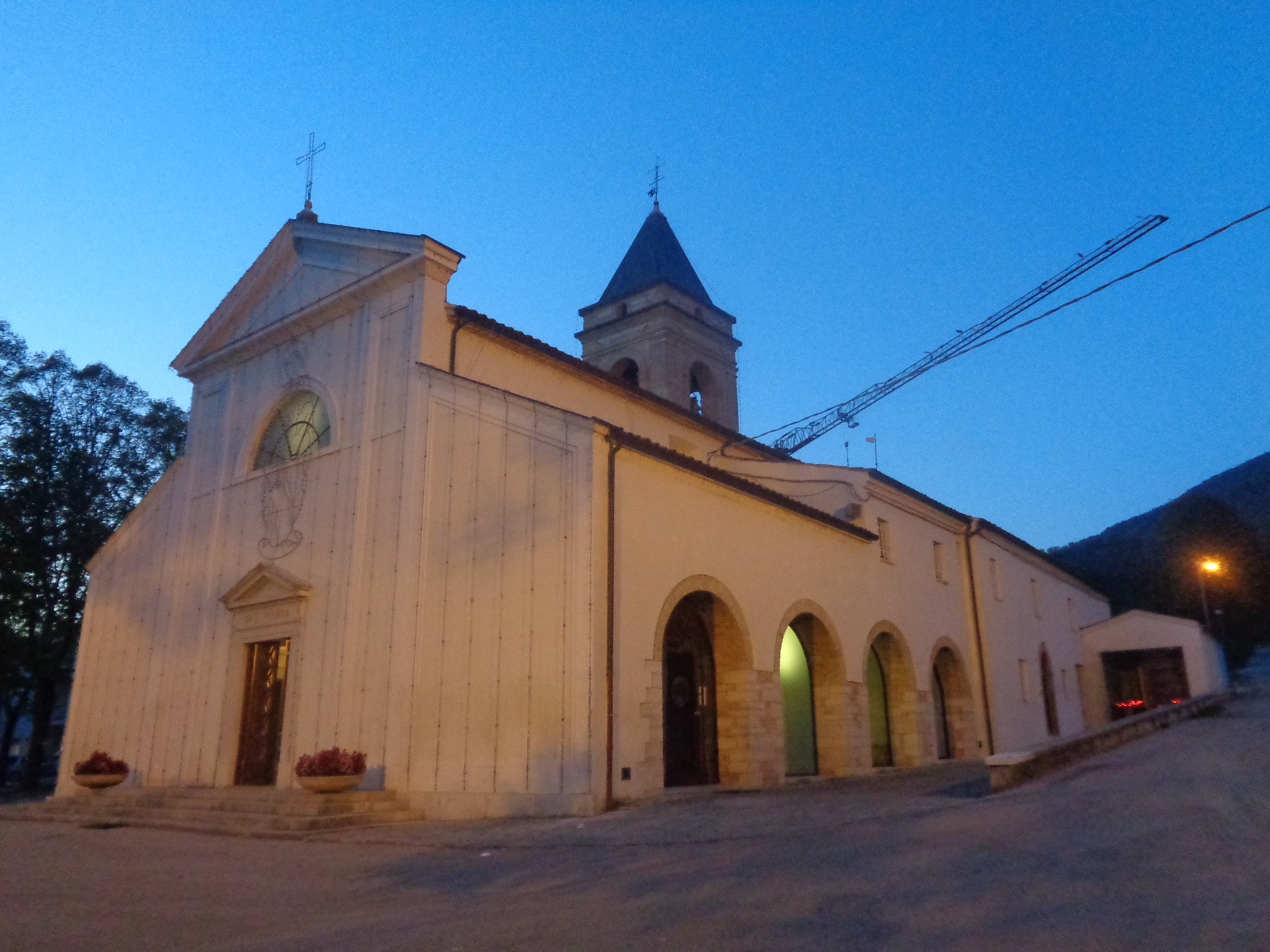
- The Pelingo Sanctuary in Acqualagna

- Location of Acqualagna in Italy Acqualagna (Marche)
- Coordinates: 43°37′N 12°40′E
- Country: Italy
- Region: Marche
- Province: Pesaro and Urbino (PU)
- Frazioni: Furlo, Pelingo, Case nuove, Fossato, Pole, Petriccio, Naro, Farneta, Bellaria, Canfiagio, Cà Romano

Area
  - Total: 50.8 km^{2} (19.6 sq mi)
- Elevation: 204 m (669 ft)

Population (December 2004)
  - Total: 4,304
  - Density: 84.7/km^{2} (219/sq mi)
- Demonym: Acqualagnesi
- Time zone: UTC+1 (CET)
  - Summer (DST): UTC+2 (CEST)
- Postal code: 61041
- Dialing code: 0721
- Patron saint: St. Lucy
- Website: Official website

Acqualagna (Italian: [akkwaˈlaɲɲa]) is a comune (municipality) in the Province of Pesaro e Urbino in the Italian region Marche, located about 70 kilometres (43 mi) west of Ancona and about 40 kilometres (25 mi) southwest of Pesaro. As of 31 December 2004, it had a population of 4,304 and an area of 50.8 square kilometres (19.6 mi^{2}). It is one of the main centers in Italy for truffle. The Candigliano is joined by the Burano in the vicinity of the town.

Acqualagna borders the following municipalities: Cagli, Fermignano, Urbania, Urbino.

== History ==
The current name derives from the Latin name Aqua Lanea, meaning "Water Slaughter", and which remembered the battle of Gualdo Tadino fought nearby between Totila's Ostrogoths and Narses's Byzantine armies during the Gothic Wars.

In the neighbourhood existed the Roman town of Pitinum Mergens, destroyed by Alarich I. The survivors founded the castle of Montefalcone, from which the current Acqualagna developed.

In 1901, notorious brigand Giuseppe Musolino was caught in Acqualagna after he had escaped prison more than two years prior. His subsequent trial, where the charges he faced (and was convicted for) included seven counts of murder and six of attempted murder, received significant international media attention.

== Main sights ==
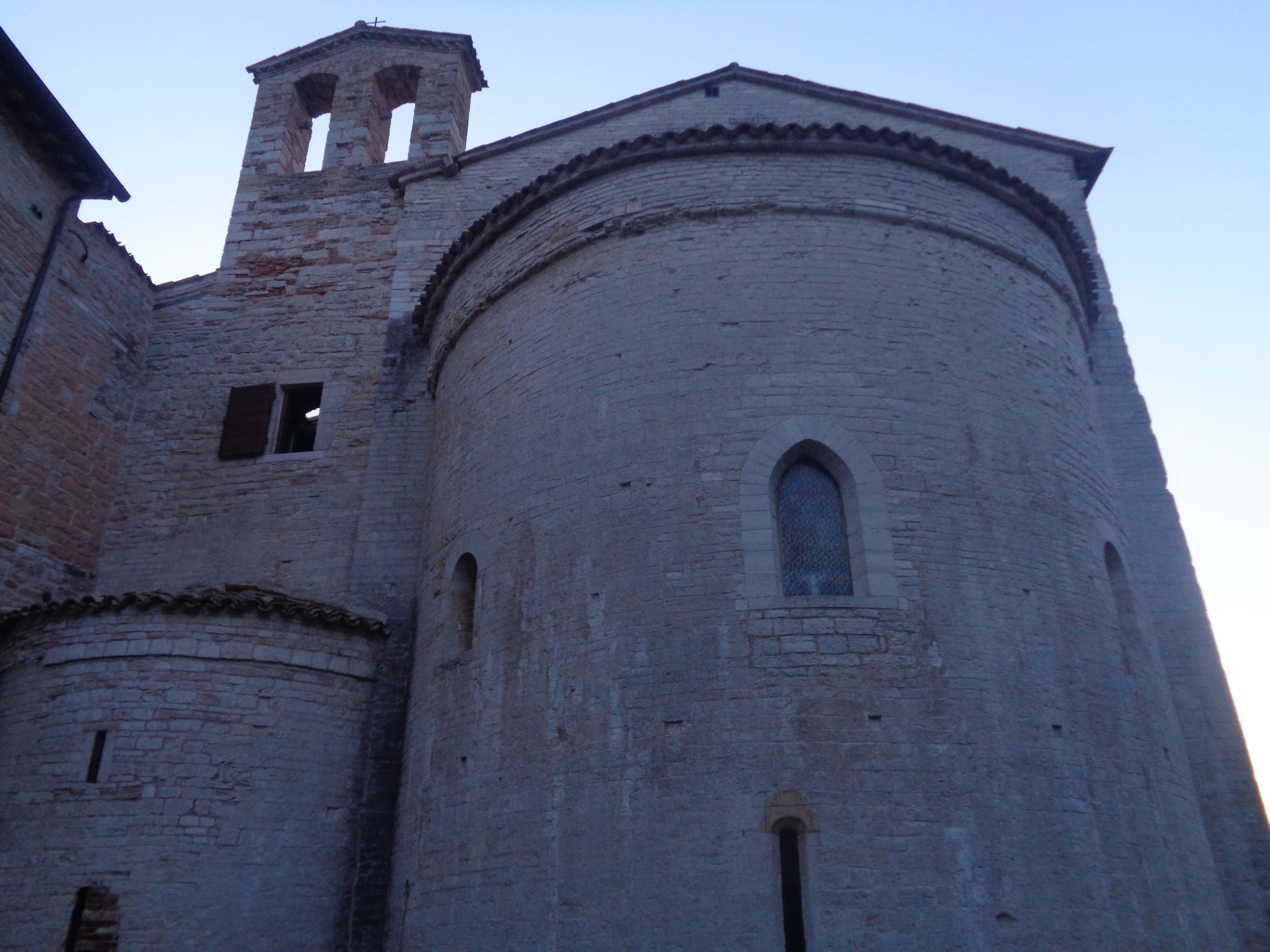
San Vincenzo al Furlo abbey

- Parish church, with traces of 15th-16th century frescoes.
- Pelingo Sanctuary
- San Vincenzo al Furlo, what remains of a 7th-century abbey in which resided St. Romuald (1011) and Pier Damiani (1042). The current church, in Romanesque style, was founded by abbot Bonaventura in 1271. The crypt has ancient columns and a 9th-10th century altar.
- Villa di Colombara, where a Roman farm has been excavated.
- Furlo Gorge: one of the most spectacular gorges in Italy, with a 2000-year-old Roman tunnel
- Pietralata Sanctuary: nestled in the hills adjoining to the gorge lays this wonderful restored small monastery

== Demographic evolution ==
Historical population

Year	Pop.	±%
1861	2,319	—
1871	2,826	+21.9%
1881	2,929	+3.6%
1901	3,485	+19.0%
1911	3,463	−0.6%

Year	Pop.	±%
1921	3,722	+7.5%
1931	3,838	+3.1%
1936	4,074	+6.1%
1951	4,206	+3.2%
1961	3,807	−9.5%

Year	Pop.	±%
1971	3,420	−10.2%
1981	3,683	+7.7%
1991	3,971	+7.8%
2001	4,178	+5.2%
2005	4,304	+3.0%

Source: Data from ISTAT
