= Biscubio =

Location
- Country: Italy

Physical characteristics
- Source
  - location: Appennino Umbro-Marchigiano mountains
  - elevation: 700 m (2,300 ft)
- Mouth: Candigliano
  - coordinates: 43°35′24″N 12°30′42″E
- Length: 22 km (14 mi)
- Basin size: 134 km^{2} (52 sq mi)
- Discharge
  - average: 2 m^{3}/s (71 cu ft/s)

Basin features
- Progression: Candigliano→ Metauro→ Adriatic Sea

The Biscubio is a river in the Umbria and Marche regions of Italy. Its source is in the province of Perugia near the border with the province of Pesaro e Urbino in the Appennino Umbro-Marchigiano mountains. The river flows northeast into Pesaro e Urbino south of Mercatello sul Metauro. It then flows east through the mountains near Apecchio and the exclave called Monte Ruperto belonging to Città di Castello until it joins the Candigliano near Piobbico.
