= Burano (river) =

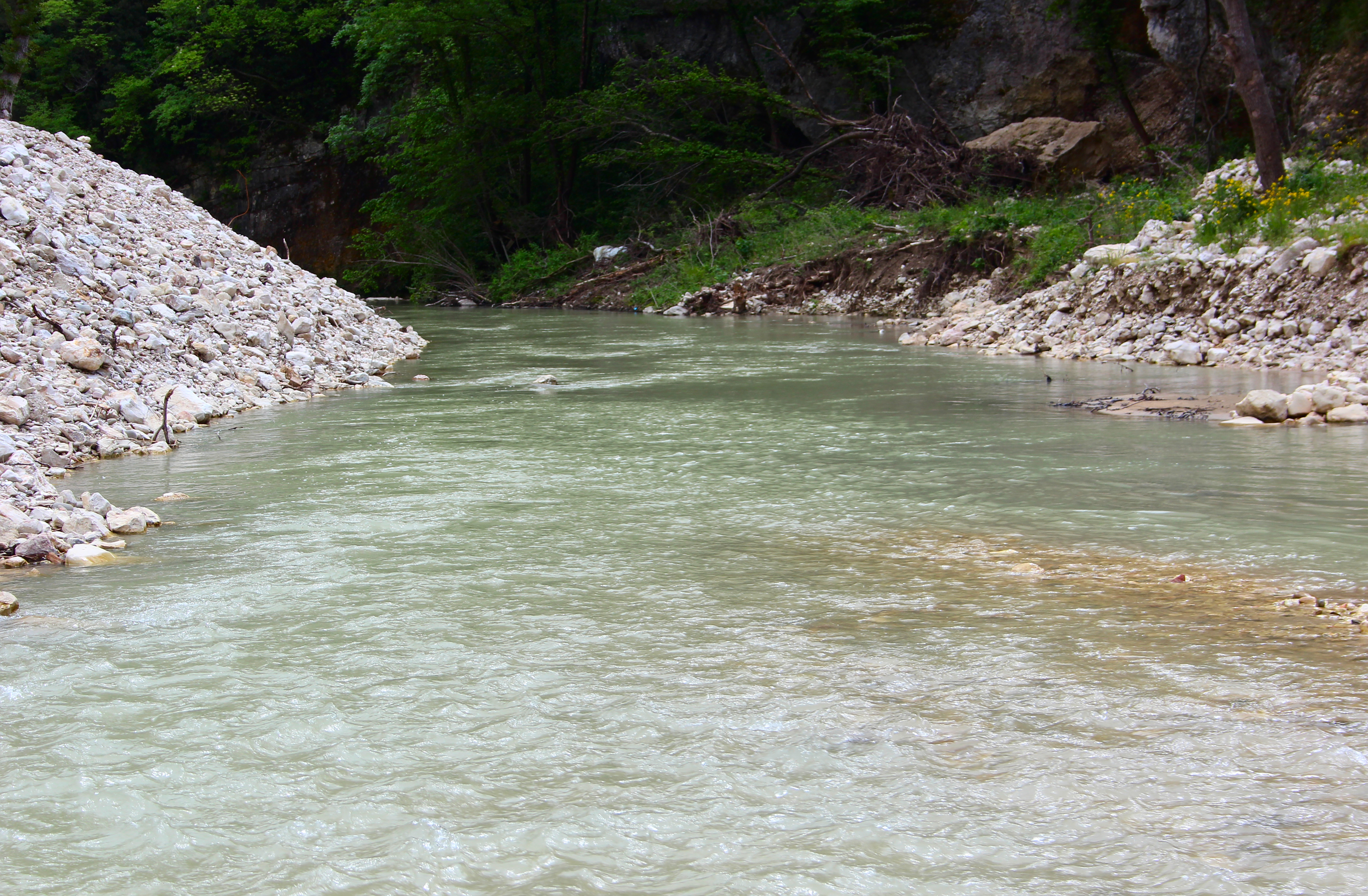

Location
- Country: Italy

Physical characteristics
- Source
  - location: Appennino Umbro-Marchigiano mountains
  - elevation: 800 m (2,600 ft)
- Mouth: Candigliano
  - coordinates: 43°37′00″N 12°40′31″E

Basin features
- Progression: Candigliano→ Metauro→ Adriatic Sea

The Burano is a river in the Umbria and Marche regions of Italy. Its source is in the province of Perugia in the Appennino Umbro-Marchigiano mountains. The river crosses the border into the province of Pesaro e Urbino and flows north near Monte Catria, Cantiano, Monte Nerone, and Cagli before entering the Candigliano at Acqualagna.
