= Ponte della Concordia, Fossombrone =

Bridge in Marche, Italy

Coordinates: 43.6883°N 12.8034°E

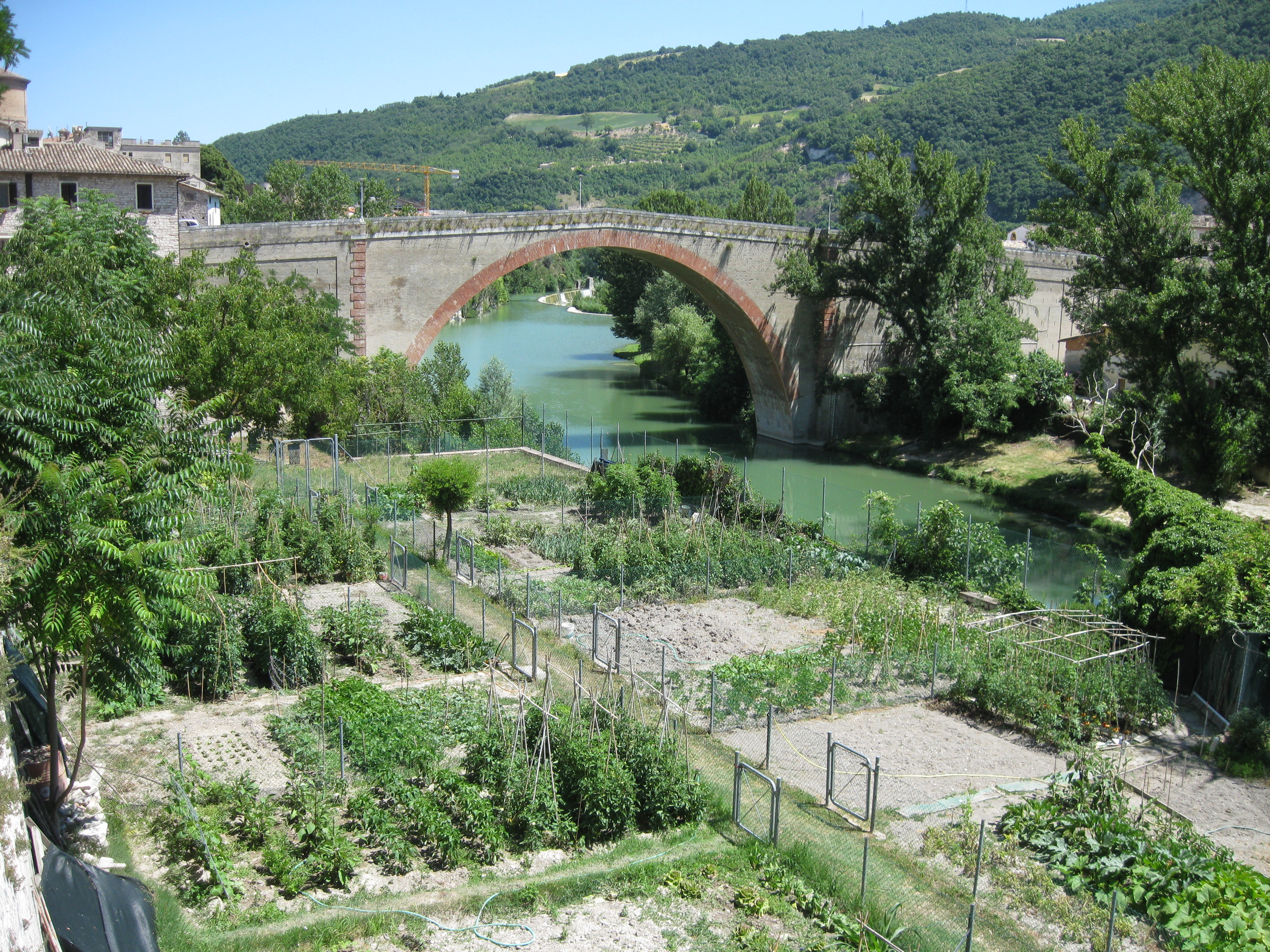
Fossombrone bridge

The Ponte della Concordia is a bridge over the river Metauro in Fossombrone, Province of Pesaro and Urbino, region of Marche, Italy.

The original bridge was built in the second half of the 13th century, and it had five arches. It was destroyed by a flood of the river Metauro in 1765. In 1782 an architect from Pesaro, Luigi Baldelli, designed a new bridge, this time with just a single arche donkey-back (on the model of "devil's bridges" of medieval tradition), to avoid future flooding problems. In 1944, during World War II, German soldiers destroyed the bridge by setting up mines, in hopes of slowing down the incoming allied forces. The bridge existing today was rebuilt in 1946, in the same place and with the same architecture as the previous bridge.
