= Quadreria Cesarini, Fossombrone =

Coordinates: 43.68897°N 12.802°E

The Quadreria Cesarini is a small museum and painting gallery in Fossombrone, province of Pesaro e Urbino, Marche, Italy.

== History ==
The house and collection were donated to the town by Giuseppe Cesarini (1895-1977). The collection includes nearly 70 oil paintings, and many sketches by the painter Anselmo Bucci (1887-1955), a friend of Cesarini. In 1940, professor Rodolfo Pallucchini donated a prominent landscape of Grizzana by Giorgio Morandi (1890-1964). Other works belong to Angelo Biancini (1911-1988). Among the sculptures is one depicting Lo zampognaro by Marino Marini (1901-1980). The building dates to the 16th century with reconstruction in 1685, and again in the late 1940s. Other works include sculptures by Francesco Messina, a painting depicting Ragazzi di Olevano by Gino Severini, and works by Achille Funi.
