= Cantiano =

- Comune
- Comune di Cantiano
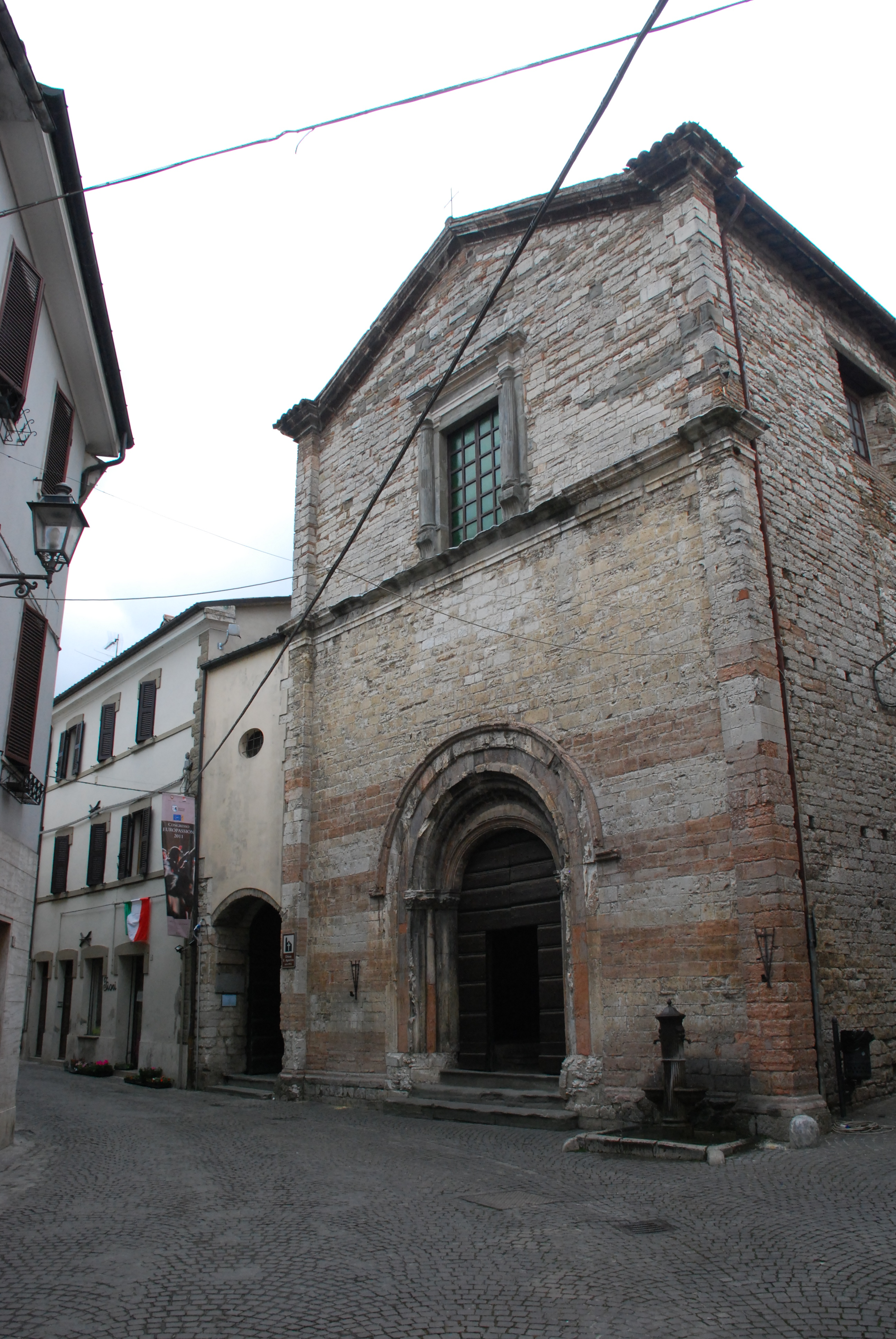
- Church in Cantiano

- Coat of arms

- Location within Italy Location within Marche
- Coordinates: 43°28′N 12°38′E
- Country: Italy
- Region: Marche
- Province: Pesaro e Urbino (PU)
- Frazioni: Chiaserna, Fossato, Moria, Palcano, Pontedazzo, Pontericciòli, San Crescentino, Balbano, Vilano, San Rocco, Palazzo, Tranquillo

Government
  - Mayor: Alessandro Piccini

Area
  - Total: 83.25 km^{2} (32.14 sq mi)
- Elevation: 360 m (1,180 ft)

Population (31 October 2020)
  - Total: 2,049
  - Density: 24.61/km^{2} (63.75/sq mi)
- Demonym: Cantianesi
- Time zone: UTC+1 (CET)
  - Summer (DST): UTC+2 (CEST)
- Postal code: 61044
- Dialing code: 0721
- Patron saint: St. John the Baptist and Madonna della Misericordia
- Saint day: 24 June and 4th Sunday in August
- Website: Official website

Cantiano is a comune (municipality) in the Province of Pesaro e Urbino in the Italian region Marche, located about 100 km (62 mi) west of Ancona and about 70 km (43 mi) southwest of Pesaro. The Burano flows in the town.
