= Piobbico =

- Comune
- Comune di Piobbico
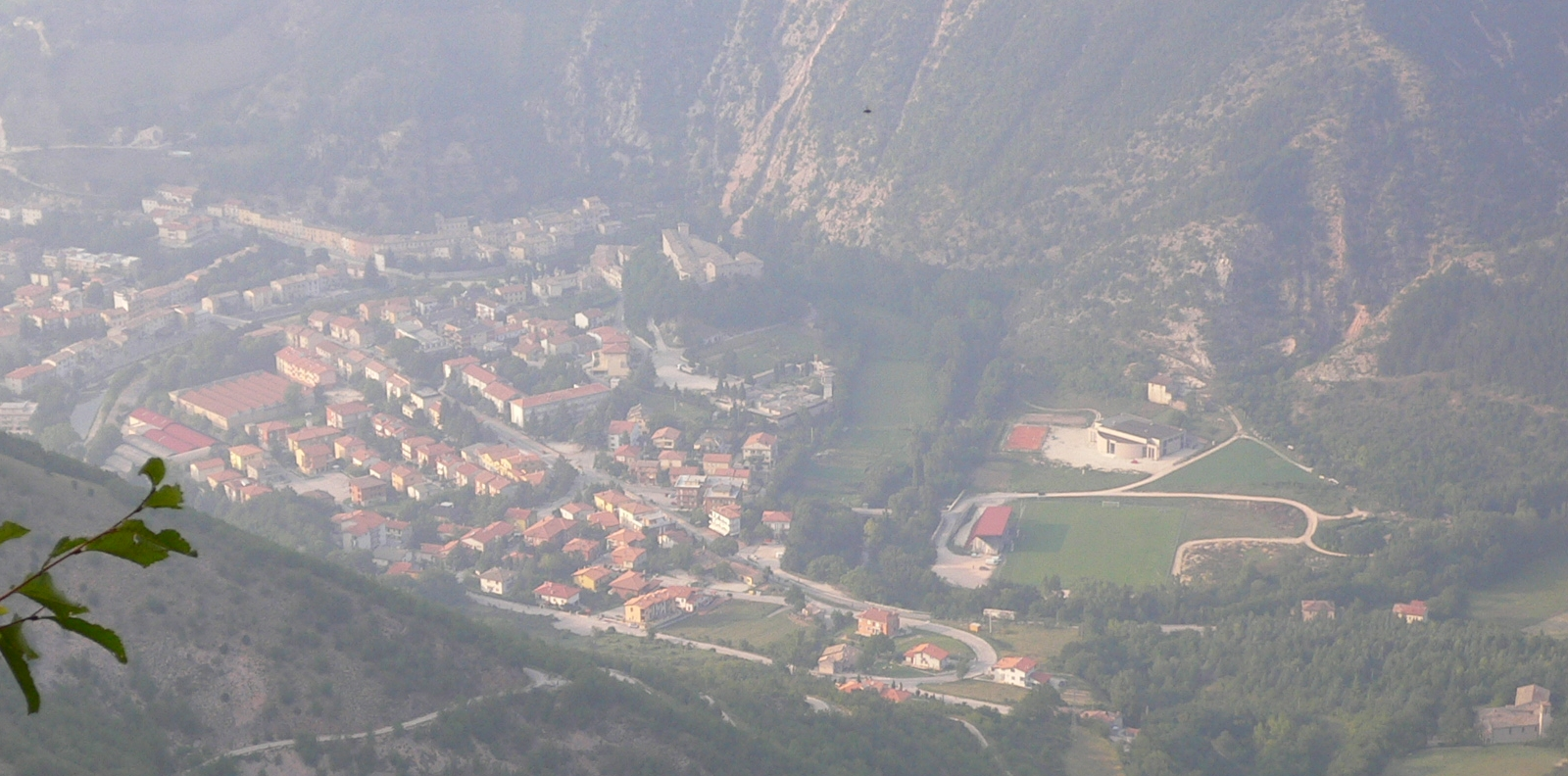
- View of Piobbico

- Location within Italy Location within Marche
- Coordinates: 43°35′15″N 12°30′40″E
- Country: Italy
- Region: Marche
- Province: Pesaro e Urbino (PU)
- Frazioni: Acquanera, Baciardi, Ca'Giovaccolo, Colle, Monteforno, Piano

Government
  - Mayor: Alessandro Urbini

Area
  - Total: 48.2 km^{2} (18.6 sq mi)
- Elevation: 339 m (1,112 ft)

Population (31 October 2020)
  - Total: 1,837
  - Density: 38.1/km^{2} (98.7/sq mi)
- Demonym: Piobbichesi
- Time zone: UTC+1 (CET)
  - Summer (DST): UTC+2 (CEST)
- Postal code: 61046
- Dialing code: 0722
- Patron saint: St. Stephen
- Saint day: 26 December
- Website: Official website

Piobbico (Romagnol: Piòbich) is a comune (municipality) in the Province of Pesaro e Urbino in the Italian region Marche, located about 80 kilometres (50 mi) west of Ancona and about 50 kilometres (31 mi) southwest of Pesaro.

Monte Nerone and the location of the Battle of the Metaurus are nearby. The Candigliano is joined by the Biscubio in the vicinity of the town.

== History ==
Although the area was settled in Etruscan and Roman times, Piobbico is known from the Middle Ages as the seat of Brancaleoni lords, who held it from c. 1000 until the 19th century. Starting from the 12th century they ruled over the whole Massa Trabaria, until, after their opposition to Papal commander Gil de Albornoz and Pope Martin V they gave away their title of Duke to Federico Montefeltro in 1474, before receiving from the same Federico Montefeltro the coat of arms of the Duke of Urbino. Again in 1576, the Duke was given an oath of loyalty from Antonio Brancaleoni. After the male lineage of Brancaleoni ended, on 25 May 1729, the church took judicial control from the Brancaleoni family for just three years - after this, a papal bill extended the rights to Piobbico to the female line of the family - it thus stayed in the family's control until 1816.

The town is known as the host to the Festival of the Ugly, which is organized annually by the World Association of Ugly People and held on the first Sunday in September.

== Main sights ==
- Brancaleoni Castle (13th century, turned into a Renaissance residence in 1573–87).
- Church of St. Peter, rebuilt in the 17th century
- Church of Sant'Antonio (1375, rebuilt after an earthquake in 1781)
- Sanctuary of Santa Maria in Val d'Abisso, dating to the 11th century or before and located nearby the Monte Nerone. The current structure, erected in the 15th and 16th centuries, houses an altarpiece by Raffaellino del Colle and frescoes of the Umbro-Marchigian school. The nave is in Romanesque style.
