= Fossombrone =

Comune of Marche, Italy

- Comune
- Comune di Fossombrone
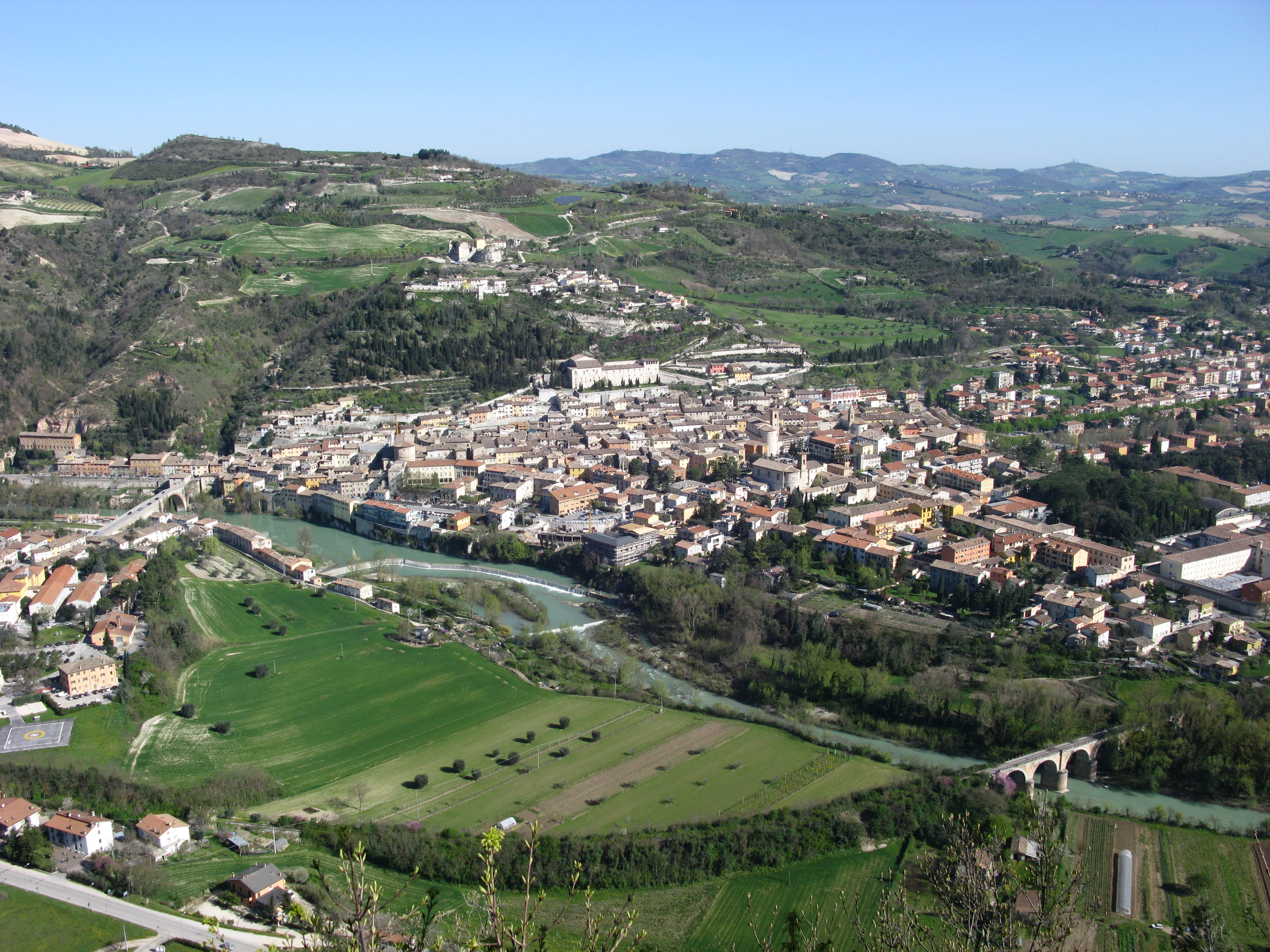
- View of Fossombrone

- Coat of arms

- Location within Italy Location within Marche
- Coordinates: 43°42′N 12°49′E
- Country: Italy
- Region: Marche
- Province: Pesaro and Urbino (PU)
- Frazioni: Belvedere, Calmazzo, Ghilardino, Isola di Fano, Mont'Alto, San Lazzaro, Torricella, Bellaguardia, San Gervasio, San Martino dei muri, Santa Maria della valle

Government
  - Mayor: Massimo Berloni

Area
  - Total: 106 km^{2} (41 sq mi)
- Elevation: 118 m (387 ft)

Population (31 December 2017)
  - Total: 9,454
  - Density: 89.2/km^{2} (231/sq mi)
- Demonym: Fossombronesi or Forsempronesi
- Time zone: UTC+1 (CET)
  - Summer (DST): UTC+2 (CEST)
- Postal code: 61034
- Dialing code: 0721
- Patron saint: Saint Aldebrandus of Fossombrone
- Saint day: 1 May
- Website: Official website

Fossombrone is a town and comune in the province of Pesaro and Urbino, in the Marche region of central Italy.

== History ==
The ancient Roman colony of Forum Sempronii took its name from Gaius Sempronius Gracchus.

Near the Furlo Pass, during the Gothic War, was fought in 552 the Battle of Taginae, in which Totila was overcome by the Byzantine general, Narses.

Fossombrone was included in the Donation of Pepin, but remained subject to the Duchy of Spoleto until 1198, when it passed under Papal rule. The Malatesta sold it to the famous Federico III da Montefeltro, under whom the city flourished. Also positive for the city was the reign of the della Rovere dukes, who enlarged it (in particular, Francesco Maria II expanded the settlement in the lower area up to the Metauro river). In 1631 it returned to the Papal States, and was annexed to Italy in 1860.

== Main sights ==
The city and its environs abound in antiquities, especially inscriptions. Noteworthy remains are the statue of the god Vertumnus; the Furlo Pass, constructed by the Emperor Vespasian to shorten the passage of that mountain; the bridge of Trajan (115) near Calmazzo, and the bridge now called Ponte della Concordia, originally built in 292 by Diocletian, both over the Metaurus.

=== Religious buildings ===
- Fossombrone Cathedral: built in neoclassical style in 1772–1784.
- Sant'Agostino: (14th century, enlarged in the 18th century). The façade with the coat of arms of the House of Malatesta. The interior houses a canvas by Federico Zuccari.
- San Filippo: deconsecrated church with frescoes and paintings, now used for cultural events.
- San Francesco: located in piazza Dante built in the 18th century at the site of a church of Santa Francesca Romana. The façade has an incomplete sandstone relief by Domenico Rosselli, depicting the Madonna and child with Sts Francis and Bernardino. It was damaged in World War II. The interior is Neoclassical and houses a main altarpiece by Guerrieri depicting a Crucifixion with Saints Francis and Jerome, and a 17th-century crucifix.*Ducal Palace, attributed to Francesco di Giorgio Martini and Girolamo Genga, and built for Cardinal Giuliano della Rovere, brother of the Duke Guidobaldo II. Notable are the Renaissance court and the Cardinal's chapel.
- Santi Giovanni Battista e Floriano

=== Secular buildings ===
- Corte Bassa, a 16th-century residence of the Dukes of Urbino.
- Corte Alta is instead from the 13th century, and was later renewed under Federico da Montefeltro with a notable Renaissance façade and pavement. The duke Guidobaldo I stayed here frequently, and also died here.
- Palazzo Comunale (Town Hall, 16th century).
- Palazzo Vescovile ("Bishop's Palace", built from 1479). It has a Renaissance façade with a portico and a fresco of the Crucifixion attributed to Bartolomeo di Gentile (1493).
- Rocca Malatestiana (13th to 15th century) now in ruin.
- Quadreria Cesarini - a house museum: the collection features mainly 20th century local artists

== Sports ==
- FC Fossombrone, a football club whose strip is produced by Dirk Bikkembergs, a Belgian fashion designer.

== Twin towns ==
- Entraigues-sur-la-Sorgue, France

== See also ==
- Roman Catholic Diocese of Fossombrone
- Roman Catholic Diocese of Fano-Fossombrone-Cagli-Pergola
