= San Filippo, Fossombrone =

Church in Fossombrone, Italy

Coordinates: 43°41′22.83″N 12°48′36.3″E

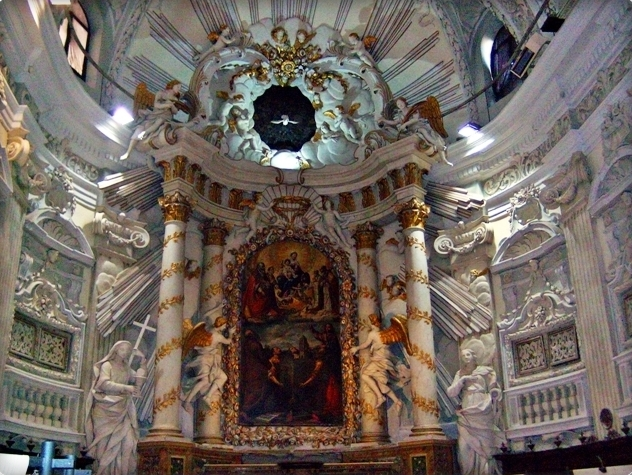
The inside of the San Filippo church.

San Filippo is a Baroque-style Roman Catholic former church, now deconsecrated, located Corso Garibaldi, near Porta Fano, in Fossombrone, region of Marche, Italy. The church was erected between 1608 and 1613; and dedicated to the patron saints of the town. It had been commissioned earlier to celebrate the birth of the ill-fated Federico Ubaldo, son and heir of the Duke Francesco Maria II Della Rovere. But it was ceded soon to the Order of the Oratory of Saint Philip Neri, although they did not have a formal charter in the town till 1620.

The brick facade is incomplete and in 2015 appears nearly decrepit, with closed windows; however, under the Oratorians, the interior of the church was decorated with an exuberant, nearly rococo stucco decoration, completed in part by Tommaso Amantini. Decoration continued till consecration in 1726.

The interior has a number of paintings by Giovanni Francesco Guerrieri, including a Madonna with the Five Patron Saints of Pesaro offering her the Planned Church, a St Michael Archangel and the Trinity, a St Barnaba Praying. The church also has a St John the Baptist painted by Carlo Ridolfi, and works by Francesco Gessi, Lazzaro Baldi, Giovanni Diamantini, and Giovanni Lapis.

The church is now used for concerts and cultural events.
