= Saltara =

- Frazione
- Location of Saltara in Italy
- Coordinates: 43°45′12.35″N 12°53′51.36″E
- Country: Italy
- Region: Marche
- Province: Pesaro e Urbino (PU)
- Comune: Colli al Metauro

Area
  - Total: 9.99 km^{2} (3.86 sq mi)
- Elevation: 160 m (520 ft)

Population (31 December 2015)
  - Total: 6,925
  - Density: 693/km^{2} (1,800/sq mi)
- Demonym: Saltaresi
- Time zone: UTC+1 (CET)
  - Summer (DST): UTC+2 (CEST)
- Postal code: 61036
- Dialing code: 0721
- Patron saint: St. Sebastian
- Saint day: 20 January

Saltara is a frazione of the comune of Colli al Metauro in the province of Pesaro e Urbino, Marche, central Italy. It is on a 120-metre (390 ft) hill overlooking the lower Metauro valley. It was a separate comune until 1 January 2017.

Coat of Arms

Before World War II Saltara was a center of pallone col bracciale playing.

== Main sights ==
- Remains of the medieval castle
- Former church of Fonte (1595)
- Sanctuary of Madonna della Villa
- Convent of San Francesco di Rovereto
- Science Museum of Villa del Balì
