= Serrungarina =

Frazione in Italy

Coat of Arms

Serrungarina is a frazione of the comune of Colli al Metauro in the Province of Pesaro e Urbino in the Italian region Marche, located about 50 kilometres (31 mi) northwest of Ancona and about 20 kilometres (12 mi) south of Pesaro. It was a separate commune until 1 January 2017, and has been called one of "Il fasino 92 luoghi preziosi" (The 92 charming and precious villages) of Italy.

== See also ==
- The most beautiful villages of Italy
