= Fossombrone Cathedral =

Roman Catholic cathedral in Marche, Italy

Coordinates: 43°41′20″N 12°48′19.8″E

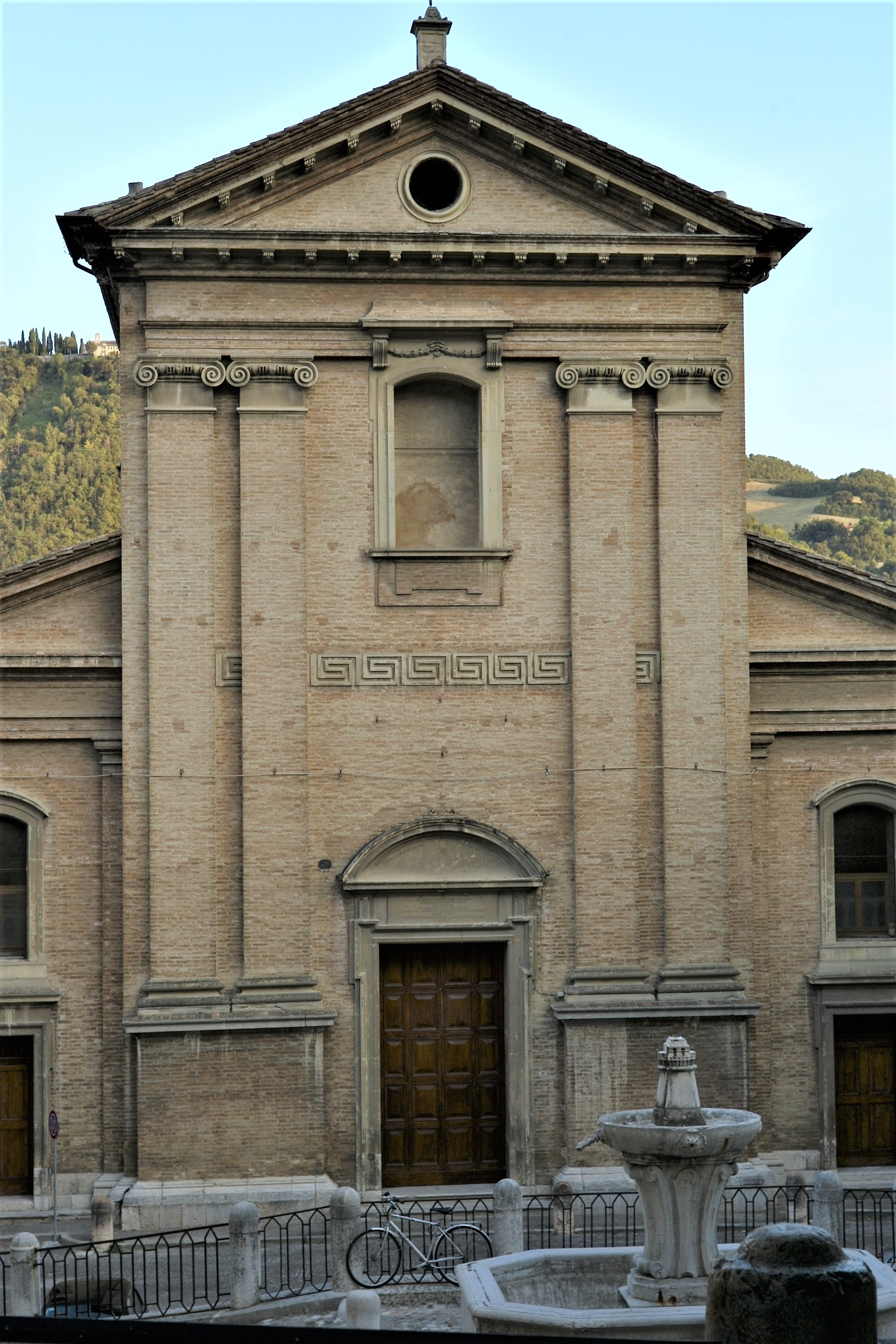
Principal façade.

Fossombrone Cathedral (Italian: Cattedrale di Sant'Aldebrando or dei Santi Aldebrando e Agostino; Duomo di Fossombrone) is a Roman Catholic cathedral dedicated to Saint Aldebrandus and Saint Augustine located in the Piazza Mazzini at the end of Corso Garibaldi in the center of the town of Fossombrone in the province of Pesaro and Urbino in the region of Marche, Italy. Formerly the cathedral of the Diocese of Fossombrone, since 1986 it has been a co-cathedral of the Diocese of Fano-Fossombrone-Cagli-Pergola.

== History ==
The church site was formerly that of a Benedictine abbey. Between 1776 and 1784 the church was completely rebuilt in Neoclassical style, with the exception of the 15th-century campanile, by the architect Cosimo Morelli. It has a tall central façade with monumental columns supporting a triangular tympanum. The interior contains three naves with polychrome altars, made of marble and scagliola, designed by Nicola Vici. The altarpieces depict: the Madonna and Child with Saints Joseph and Francis and a Madonna and Child with St Anne by Giovanni Francesco Guerrieri; as well as a Madonna and Child with Saints Anne and Aldebrandus by Claudio Ridolfi. The niches inside have bas-reliefs with images of the Virgin and Child, and Saints Aldebrandus, Peter, Paul, and Blaise. The organ was constructed in 1785 by Gaetano Callido, with a restoration in 1996–97.

In the first chapel on the left is a 14th-century fresco of the Madonna della Provvidenza by Guido Palmerucci. In the second chapel on the left is a ceramic depicting Santa Maria Goretti (1955) by Angelo Biancini, who also made the fourteen ceramic Via Crucis plaques along the nave.

Near the apse is the Chapel of the Madonna of the Rosary (cappella Passionei) with a polychrome marble altar and small canvases depicting the miracles of the Rosary painted in the 18th century. This chapel houses Guerrieri's canvas depicting the Virgin, Child and St Anne (1627). On the other side of the church, the Chapel of the Holy Sacrament was designed and completed in marble and scagliola by Eugenio Buffoni in the 19th century.

The main altarpiece depicts the Holy Trinity by an unknown 18th-century painter. Beneath the altar, an urn contains the relics of St Aldebrandus, patron of the city. The sacristy has a sculpted altarpiece (1480) made from sandstone by the sculptor Domenico Rosselli.
