= Santi Giovanni Battista e Floriano, Fossombrone =

Church in Fossombrone, Italy

Coordinates: 43.65723°N 12.84826°E

Santi Giovanni Battista e Floriano is a Renaissance architecture Roman Catholic church and adjacent Franciscan convent are located on Piazza San Giovanni in the frazione of Isola di Fano in Fossombrone, region of Marche, Italy.

== History ==
In 1529, two brothers, Ludovico and Raffaele Tenaglia formed a Franciscan hermitage on the site. The church was erected in the 16th century, but has now become the Sanctuary of the Blessed Benedetto Passionei. The convent during its long history also housed a number of early Franciscan saints including San Giuseppe da Copertino and San Serafino da Montegranaro. The interior has a wooden altar with a canvas depicting a Madonna and Saints; this is a copy of an original by Federico Barocci, painted by Gaetano Bessi. The apse has a walnut choir stalls.
