= Chiaserna =

- Frazione
- Location of Chiaserna in Italy
- Coordinates: 43°27′0″N 12°40′0″E
- Country: Italy
- Region: Marche
- Province: Pesaro e Urbino (PU)
- Comune: Cantiano
- Elevation: 484 m (1,588 ft)

Population (October 2001)
  - Total: 314
- Demonym: Chiasernesi
- Time zone: UTC+1 (CET)
  - Summer (DST): UTC+2 (CEST)
- Postal code: 61044
- Patron saint: Archangel Michael
- Saint day: 8 May

Chiaserna is a small fraction of the City of Cantiano in province of Pesaro and Urbino in the Region Marche.
