= Colli al Metauro =

- Comune
- Comune di Colli al Metauro
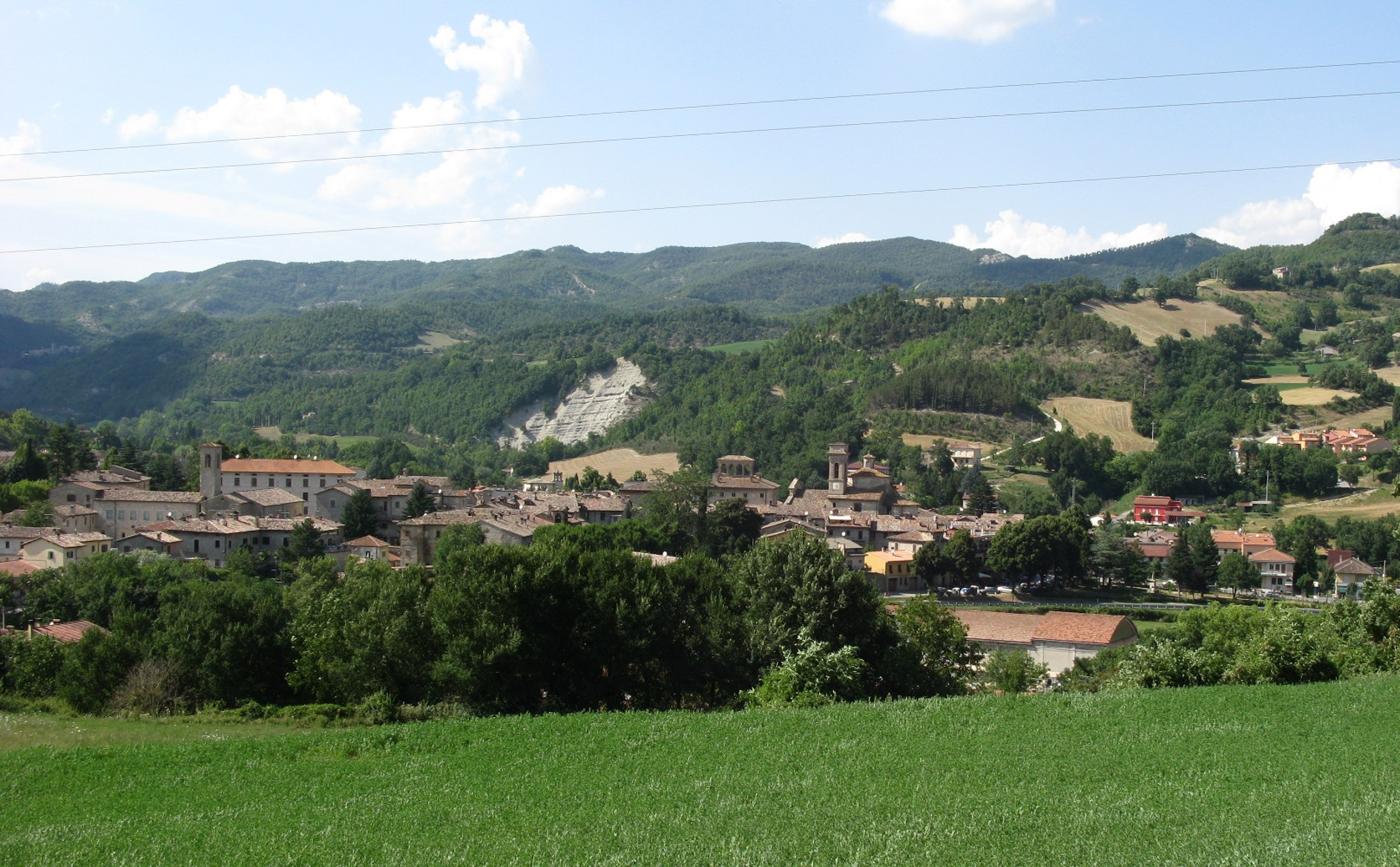
- View of Colli al Metauro

- Coat of arms

- Location within Italy Location within Marche
- Coordinates: 43°45′12.35″N 12°53′51.36″E
- Country: Italy
- Region: Marche
- Province: Pesaro e Urbino (PU)
- Frazioni: Bargni, Beato Sante, Borgaccio, Calcinelli, Fiordipiano, Montemaggiore al Metauro, Pozzuolo, Saltara, San Liberio, Serrungarina, Tavernelle, Villanova.

Government
  - Mayor: Stefano Aguzzi

Area
  - Total: 46.17 km^{2} (17.83 sq mi)
- Elevation: 429 m (1,407 ft)

Population (31 October 2020)
  - Total: 12,166
  - Density: 263.5/km^{2} (682.5/sq mi)
- Time zone: UTC+1 (CET)
  - Summer (DST): UTC+2 (CEST)
- Postal code: 61036
- Dialing code: 0721
- Patron saint: St. Teresa of Calcutta
- Saint day: September 5
- Website: Official website

Colli all Metauro is a comune (municipality) in the Province of Pesaro e Urbino in the Italian region Marche. It was created on 1 January 2017 after the merger of the comuni of Montemaggiore al Metauro, Saltara and Serrungarina. The communal seat is at Calcinelli, its largest frazione.
