= Sant'Agostino, Fossombrone =

Church in Fossombrone, Italy

Coordinates: 43°41′21.86″N 12°48′31.6″E

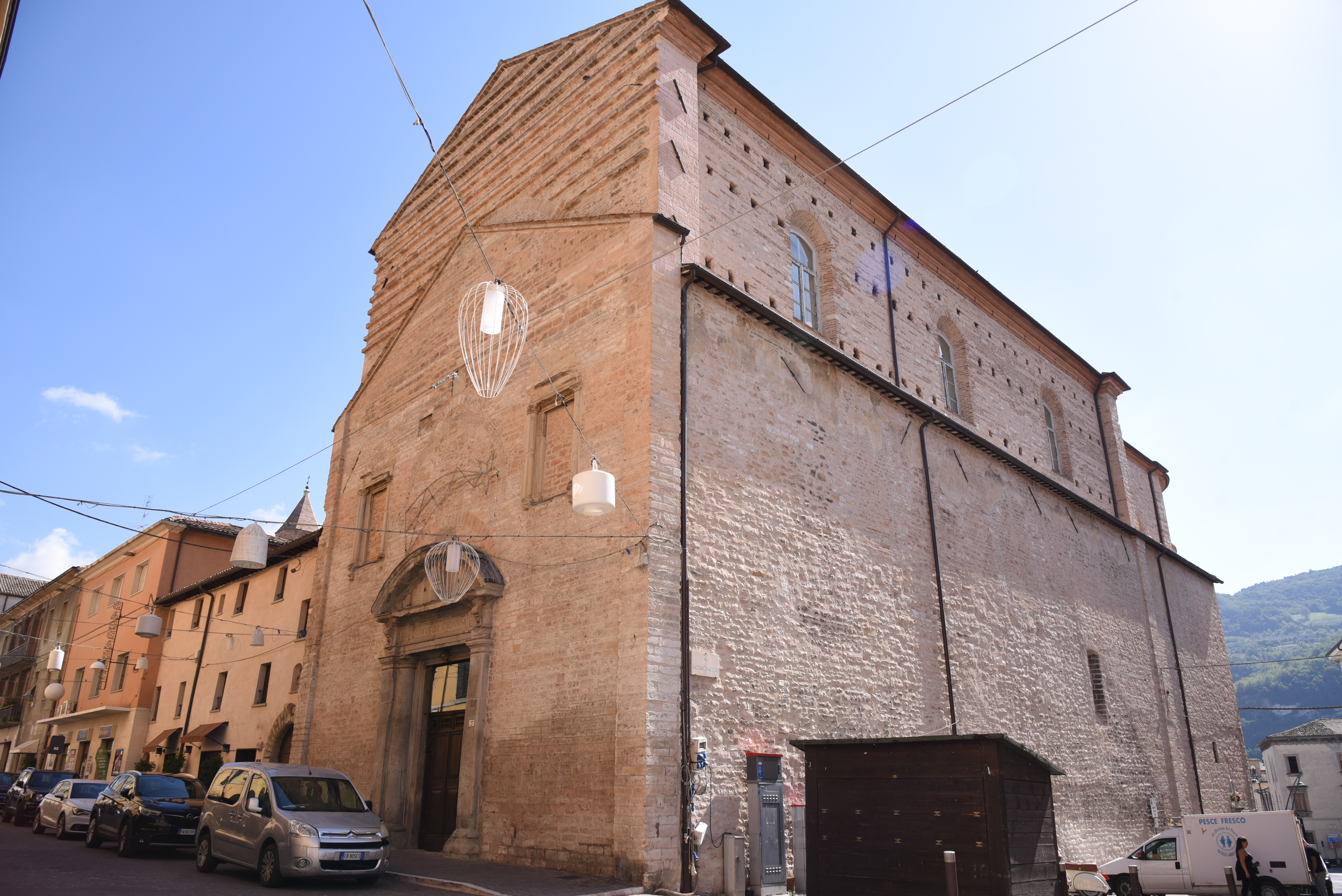
Fossombrone - Church of Sant'Agostino

Sant'Agostino is a Romanesque-style Roman Catholic church in central Fossombrone, region of Marche, Italy. The church was erected in the 14th century, and the facade still has the elements of late Romanesque architecture. The church was however refurbished in neoclassical style by Camillo Morigia in the early 1800s. The facade has the coat of arms of the Malatesta and a mortar and pestle insignia of a guild. The interior has a main altarpiece of a Nativity by Federico Zuccari. In addition, there is a Madonna and child with Saints by Giovanni Francesco Guerrieri in the second altar on the left. The church also has wooden icons of St Augustine and Santa Monica from the 17th century.
