= World Association of Ugly People =

Italian anti-discrimination organization

Motto on the emblem reads Ugliness is a virtue, beauty is slavery.

The World Association of Ugly People (Italian: Club dei Brutti, lit. "The Ugly Club") is an organization dedicated to fighting for the recognition of ugly people, in a society that places a high value on physical beauty. The over 100 years old group's motto is "A person is what he is and not what he looks like".

== History ==
The club is an expansion of an organization that was created in Piobbico, Italy in 1879. Club dei Brutti was relaunched in 1963 as a marriage agency for the town's single women. Subsequently this group reformed itself as an international organization. The World Association of Ugly People club campaigns against discrimination in the workplace based on looks. It attempts to make society more aware of ugly people's problems. It also helps people overcome their phobias and, in some cases, to find partners.

In 2007, the group unveiled a monument dedicated to ugly people in Piobbico's town square. The monument depicts an unknown person looking at his reflection in a mirror.

== Traditions ==
The club's emblem is the head of a wild boar. The club's crest features a reclining man smoking a pipe with the slogan: "Ugliness is a virtue, beauty is slavery".

The club's patron is Vulcan from Roman mythology. At birth Vulcan was so ugly that his mother threw him over a cliff. He survived and became a skilled blacksmith. For providing Achilles with superior weapons, he was admitted to Mount Olympus where he married the beautiful Venus, goddess of love.

=== President ===
The members of the World Association of Ugly People elect their president annually during the Festival of the Ugly. This event is hosted by the small town of Piobbico in the Marche region of Italy every year on the first Sunday of September.

Every year until 2007, Telesforo Iacobelli won the top prize and was president of the club, owing to his dedication to the organization. Also, he has a small nose in a culture where large noses are considered beautiful. On August 21, 2006, Iacobelli died.

== Members ==
The following people have been members of the association.

- Maurizio Costanzo
- Mike Bongiorno
- Paolo Bonolis
- Pippo Franco
- Piero Badaloni
- Alessandro Cecchi Paone
- Gerry Scotti
- Maria Amelia Monti
- Lorenzo Romano Amedeo Carlo Avogadro

== In popular culture ==
In 2010, the Association provided inspiration for the song "Club Dei Brutti" by the English band Idiot Savant.
