= Aldebrandus =

Italian Roman Catholic saint

Saint Aldebrandus

Bishop of Fossombrone
- Born: 1119; Sorrivoli, Italy
- Died: 30 April 1219; Fossombrone, Italy
- Venerated in: Roman Catholic Church
- Major shrine: Fossombrone Cathedral
- Feast: 1 May
- Attributes: episcopal robes holding the cathedral he built
- Patronage: Fossombrone, Italy

Aldebrandus or Aldebrand (Italian: Aldebrando da Fossombrone), also known as Hildebrand (1119–30 April 1219), was a Bishop of Fossombrone and a saint.

Aldebrandus was almost certainly born at Sorrivoli in the comune of Roncofreddo, Italy. He was educated by the canons of Santa Maria de Porto near Ravenna. After being ordained to the priesthood, he was appointed provost of the chapter of Rimini Cathedral, where his bold preaching against sinful living put him at odds with those in authority. He was threatened with death and forced to flee the area.

In 1170, he was appointed Bishop of Fossombrone, where he later had the cathedral built. His relics are still there.

A miracle attributed to Aldebrandus is that when he was old and bedridden, his servants brought him a cooked partridge, but as it was a fast day he was unable to eat the bird, so prayed over it, whereupon it came to life and flew away.

His feast is celebrated at Fossombrone on 1 May, but at Sorrivoli on the second Sunday of May.

== Sources ==
- Ridolfo Maria, Fra (1705). Vita di Santo Aldebrando già Vescovo della città di Fossombrone. (in Italian). Fano: Francesco Gaudenzi 1705.
- Vernacci, Augusto (1873). S. Aldebrando e il suo tempo. Cenni storici. (in Italian). Fossombrone: F, Monacelli 1873.
