= Furlo Pass =

Coordinates: 43°39′12″N 12°43′51″E

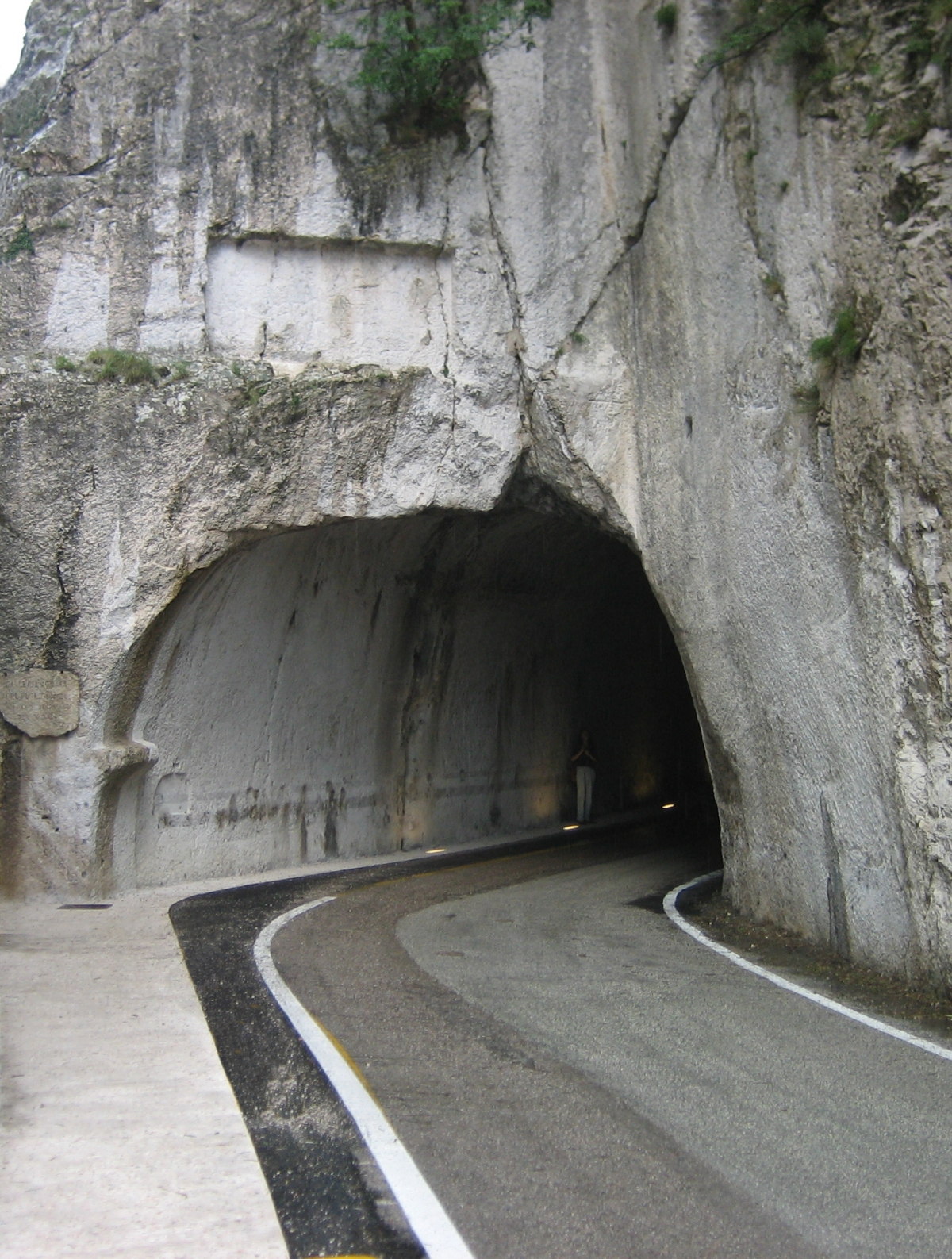
Entrance of the Roman tunnel.

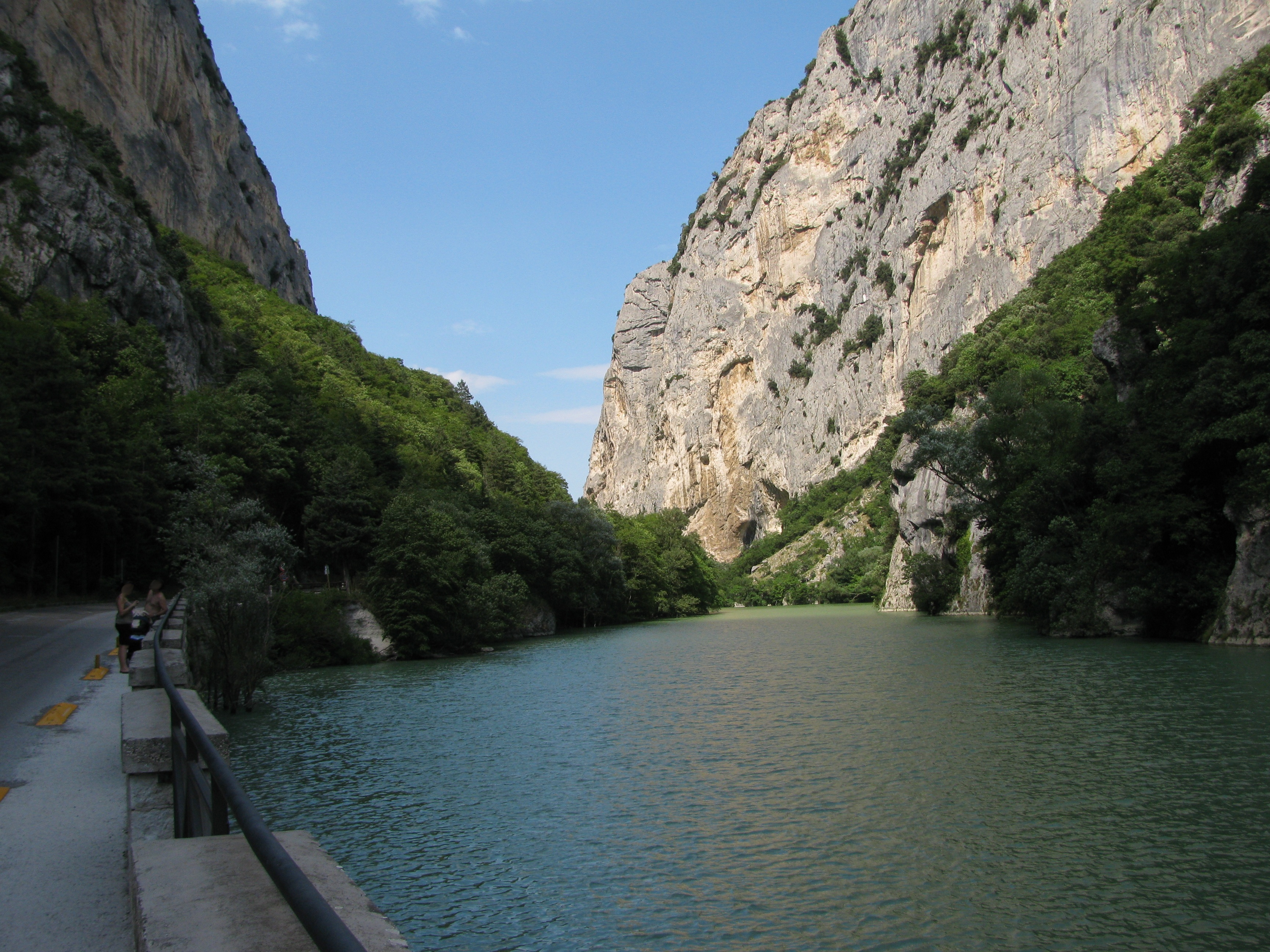
The gorge

The Furlo Pass (Italian: Gola del Furlo or Passo del Furlo) is a gorge on the ancient Roman road Via Flaminia in the Marche region of central Italy, where it passes near the Candigliano river, a tributary of the Metauro.

The gorge was formed between the Pietralata (889 m) and Paganuccio (976 m) mountains by the river Candigliano, which whooshed in full spate through the district until it was dammed in 1922. Since 2001 it has been included in a State Natural Reserve of the same name. It is often marketed to tourists in the region as the "Grand Canyon of Italy."

== History ==
The Roman emperor Vespasian had a tunnel built here to facilitate passage on the Via Flaminia at the narrowest point of the gorge (hence the name, from the Latina forulum, meaning "small hole"). Next to it is a similar but smaller tunnel dating from Etruscan times. The tunnel has a length of 38.30 meters and a height of 5.95 meters. During the Gothic Wars (6th century), the Ostrogoth King Totila had the pass fortified, but his troops were ousted by the Roman general Belisarius. The Lombards conquered the pass between 570 and 578, and destroyed the fortifications.

In the following centuries Via Flaminia was nearly abandoned. In 1502 Lucrezia Borgia used it on a journey to Ferrara and in 1506 Julius II took the road on his way to Bologna. In the beginning of the 18th century the transit remained difficult and dangerous, and only in 1776 was the tunnel and the road re-opened. Between May 23 and June 12, 1849, soldiers of the Roman Republic, commanded by Colonel L. Pianciani, fought a skirmish in the pass with the Austrian army.

During the Second World War, the Gorge experienced moments of tension, but it was not the scene of fierce clashes. The seventies saw increasing destruction of the natural beauty of the surrounding landscape, as well as the deterioration of the road, due to the intense activity in quarries located within the Gorge.

The gorge.

In the 1930s, a profile of Benito Mussolini was sculpted on the slopes of Mount Pietralata by a local branch of the Guardia Forestale (State Forestry Corps), which was destroyed by partisans during World War II. In the 1980s, traffic in the Furlo tunnel was bypassed by the construction of two highway tunnels.
