= Fermignano =

Fermignano Fermignèn
- Comune
- Comune di Fermignano
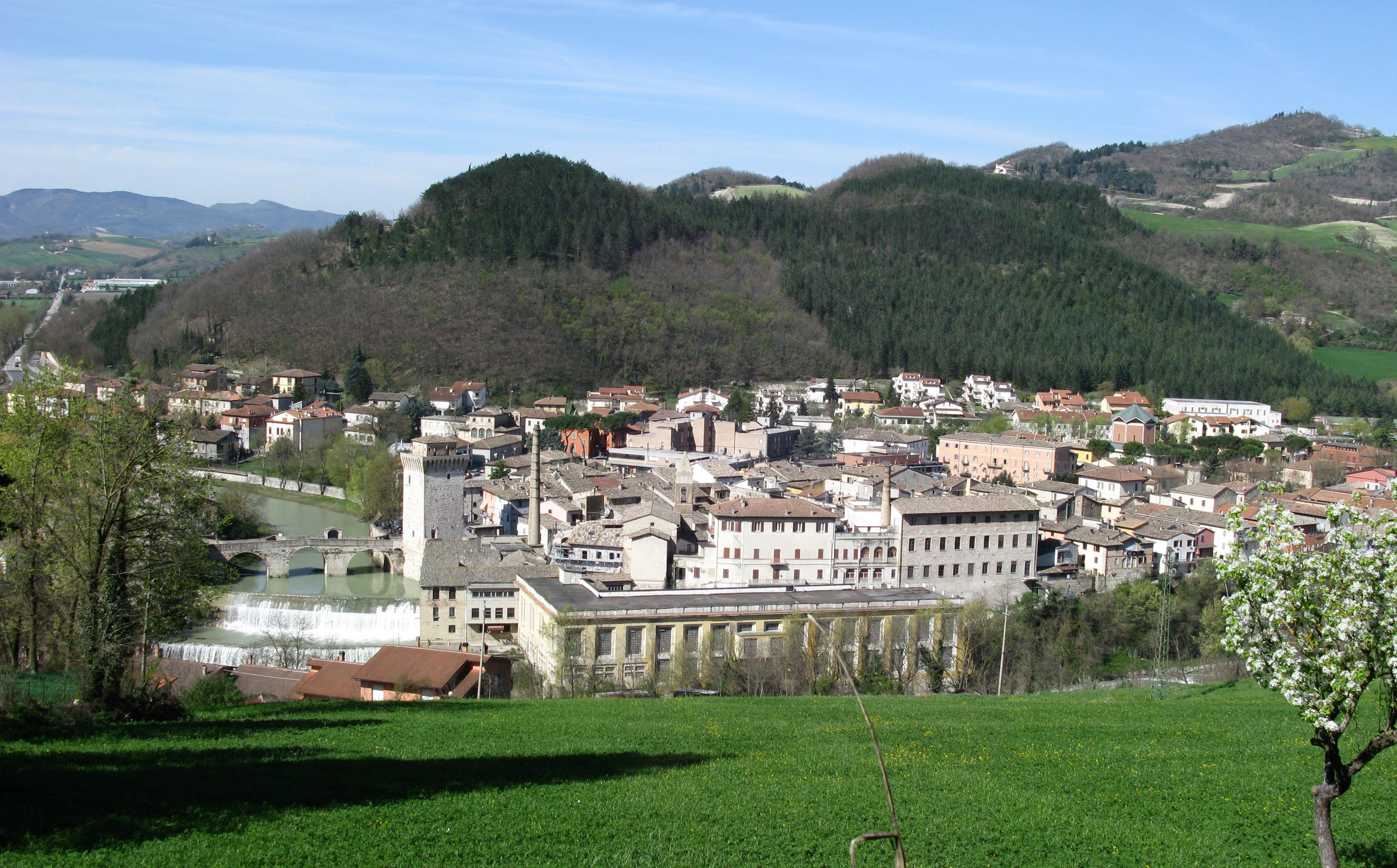
- View of Fermignano

- Location within Italy Location within Marche
- Coordinates: 43°41′N 12°39′E
- Country: Italy
- Region: Marche
- Province: Pesaro e Urbino (PU)

Government
  - Mayor: Emanuele Feduzi

Area
  - Total: 43.3 km^{2} (16.7 sq mi)

Population (2006)
  - Total: 8,384
  - Density: 194/km^{2} (501/sq mi)
- Demonym: Fermignanesi
- Time zone: UTC+1 (CET)
  - Summer (DST): UTC+2 (CEST)
- Postal code: 61033
- Dialing code: 0722
- Patron saint: St. Anne
- Saint day: 26 July
- Website: Official website

Fermignano (Romagnol: Fermignèn) is a comune (municipality) in the Province of Pesaro e Urbino in the Italian region Marche, located about 70 kilometres (43 mi) west of Ancona and about 35 kilometres (22 mi) southwest of Pesaro.

Renaissance architect Donato Bramante (1444-1514) was born here.

== History ==
Fermignano's history can be traced to 200 BC, with the name probably deriving from someone named Firmidio. The city grew up around a bridge over the Metauro river. Over the centuries, Fermignano was under the jurisdiction of the Duchy of Urbino. From 1607, it was given its own administrative council.
