= Montemaggiore al Metauro =

Coat of Arms

Montemaggiore al Metauro is a frazione of the comune of Colli al Metauro, Marche, central Italy. It was a separate comune until 1 January 2017.
