= Metauro =

River in Marche, Italy

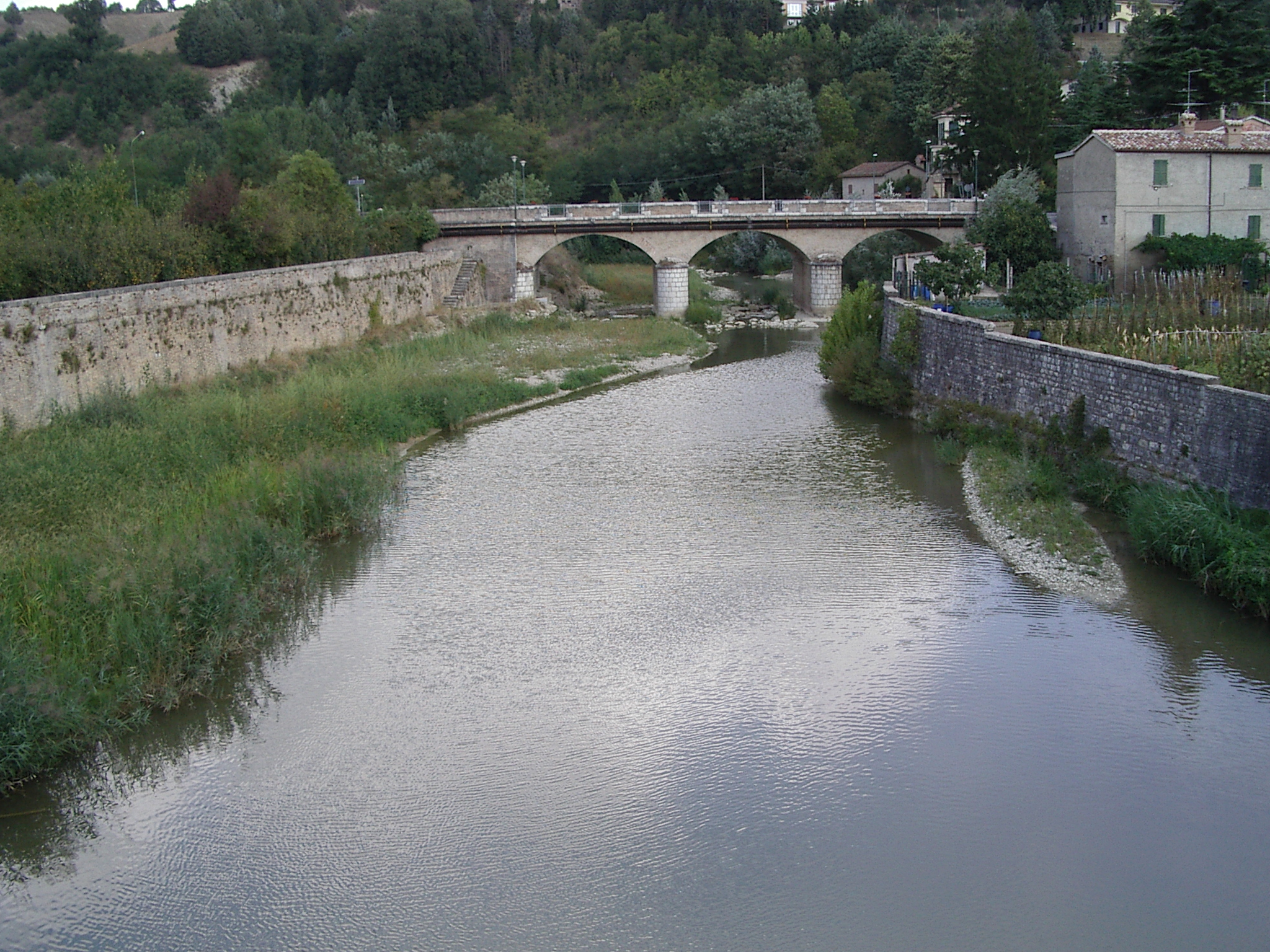
- The Metauro in Sant'Angelo in Vado

Location
- Country: Italy

Physical characteristics
- Source
  - location: near Monte dei Frati in the Province of Pesaro e Urbino
  - elevation: 1,400 m (4,600 ft)
- Mouth: Adriatic Sea
  - location: near Fano
  - coordinates: 43.8292°N 13.0546°E
- Length: 121 km (75 mi)
- Basin size: 1,325 km^{2} (512 sq mi)
- Discharge
  - average: 20.8 m^{3}/s (730 cu ft/s)

The Metauro is a river in the Marche region of central Italy. It rises in the Apennine Mountains and runs east for 110 kilometres (68 mi) or 121 kilometres (75 mi) if the Meta is included as its uppermost reach.

The name of the river in Latin is Metaurus or Mataurus. In Ancient Greek, the name of the river is Métauros, Μέταυρος which stems simply from the union of the two torrents: Meta, running from the Apennine pass Bocca Trabaria, at an elevation of 1,044 metres (3,425 ft), and Auro, flowing from Monte Maggiore, at an elevation of 1,384 metres (4,541 ft).

The source of the river is located near Monte dei Frati in the border region between the provinces of Pesaro e Urbino, Arezzo and Perugia. It flows east through Pesaro e Urbino near Mercatello sul Metauro, Sant'Angelo in Vado (where the river forms the Cascata del Sasso, "Waterfall of the Stone"), Urbania, Fermignano, Fossombrone (in whose territory it receives the waters of the Candigliano), and, after flowing into a tight valley, the Gola del Furlo, Montemaggiore al Metauro, from which it starts to flow in a plain area. The river flows northeast near Calcinelli, Saltara, Lucrezia, Cartoceto and Cuccurano before flowing into the Adriatic Sea near Fano.

== History ==
=== Battles ===
Two battles were fought on the banks of the Metauro in antiquity:

- the Battle of the Metaurus in 207 BC, in which Hasdrubal Barca, while marching to aid Hannibal, was defeated and killed by a Roman army led by the consuls Marcus Livius Salinator and Gaius Claudius Nero. It was the decisive battle of the Second Punic War. The exact site of the battle is uncertain; tradition places it between Fossombrone and the Furlo, but it probably occurred closer to the Adriatic coast;
- in 271, Roman Emperor Aurelian defeated the Alamanni, who had invaded the northern part of Italia the previous year, in the Battle of Fano, fought near the river.
