= Parco naturale regionale del Sasso Simone e Simoncello =

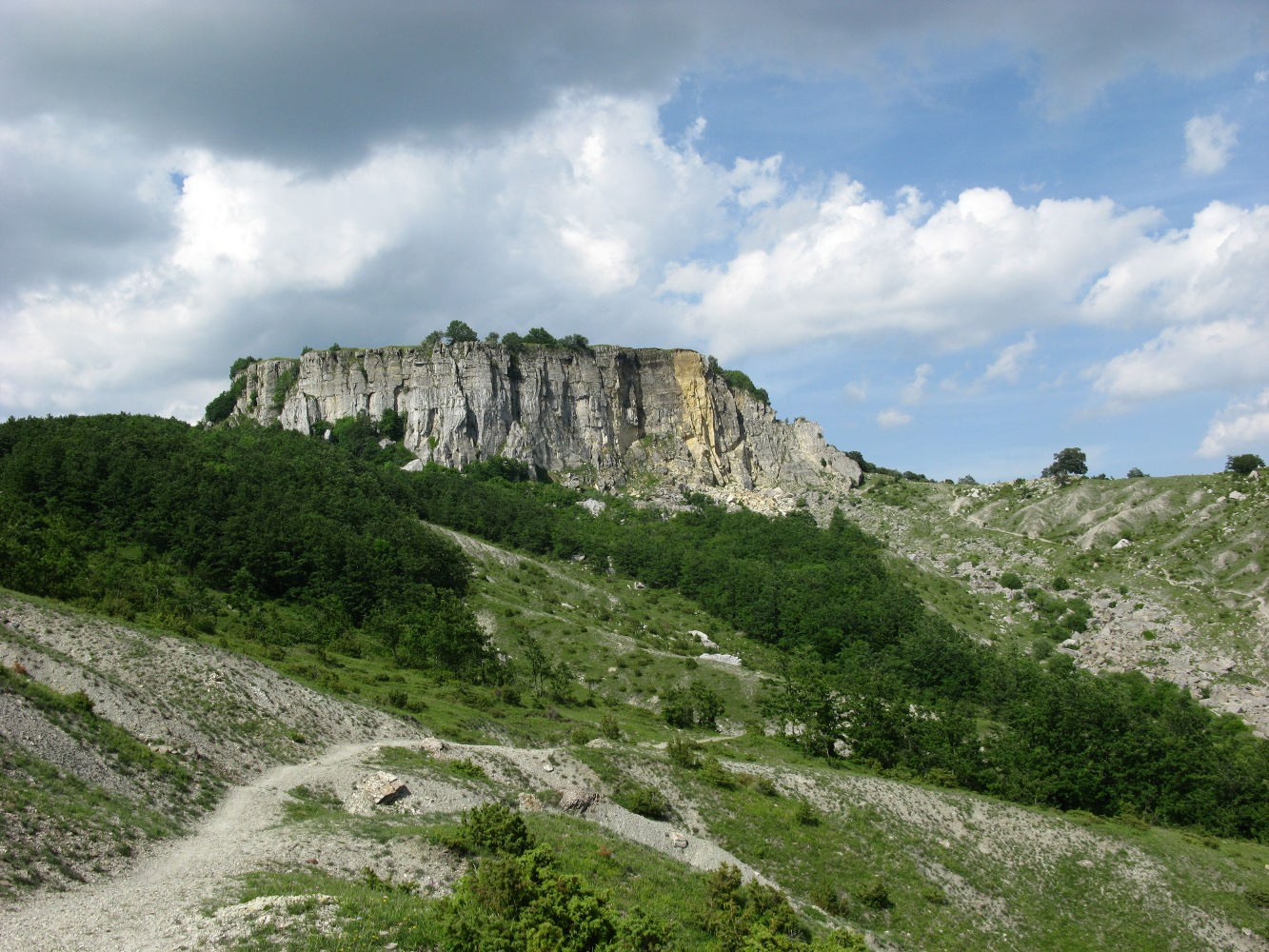
- Location: Emilia-Romagna, Marche
- Nearest city: Rimini, Pesaro
- Area: 4,791.04 ha (11,838.9 acres)
- Established: 1994
- Governing body: Ente Parco
- Website: www.parcosimone.it

Parco naturale del Sasso Simone e Simoncello (English: Regional Park of Sasso Simone and Simoncello) is an Italian regional park founded in 1994. Is one of the four parks established by Marche.

== Geography ==
The landscape presents hills and low mountains. The highest summit is Mount Carpegna, 1415 meters above the sea level. Another landmark is the Sasso di Simone, a block of calcareous rock that reaches an altitude of 1,204 m (3,950 ft) a.s.l.

== Municipalities ==
The park is across the following municipalities: Carpegna, Frontino, Montecopiolo, Pennabilli, Piandimeleto, Pietrarubbia.

== Activities ==
Many outdoor activities are possible within the park including,

- Trekking
- Cycling
- Bird watching
