= Foglia =

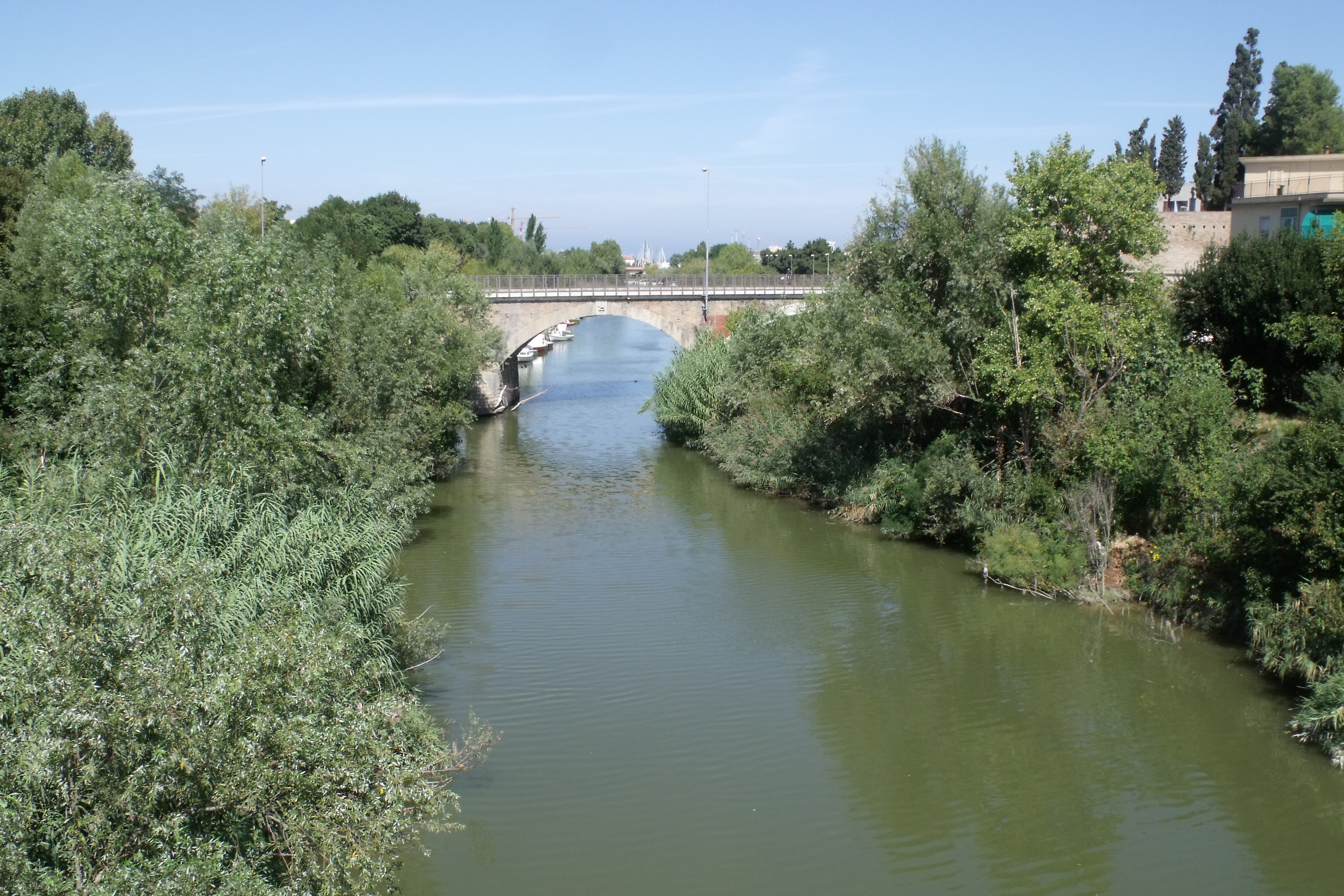
- The Foglia in Pesaro

Location
- Country: Italy

Physical characteristics
- Source
  - location: near Sestino in the province of Arezzo
  - elevation: 980 m (3,220 ft)
- Mouth: Adriatic Sea
  - location: Pesaro
  - coordinates: 43.9238°N 12.9013°E
- Length: 90 km (56 mi)
- Discharge
  - average: 7 m^{3}/s (250 cu ft/s)

The Foglia (also called Isauro, e.g. in Belforte all'Isauro) is the northernmost river of the Marche region of Italy. In ancient times it was known as Pisaurus, as it debouched into the Adriatic Sea at Pisaurum (modern Pesaro). It was also known as the Isaurus. The source of the river is west of Sestino in the province of Arezzo (which is in the Tuscany region of Italy) in the Umbrian-Marchean Apennines mountains. It flows east through an extension of the province of Pesaro e Urbino and then back into Arezzo before forming the border between Arezzo and Pesaro e Urbino. The river then flows into the province of Pesaro e Urbino past Piandimeleto and curves northeast and flows past Sassocorvaro before curving east again. The river meanders south of Montecalvo in Foglia before curving northeast and flowing near Colbordolo, Saludecio, Sant'Angelo in Lizzola, Montecchio, Montelabbate and Tavullia before entering the Adriatic Sea near Pesaro.

A personification of the river was etched by Simone Cantarini.

== History ==
The river, originally known as Isaurus, marked the boundary of the territory of the Piceni Italic tribe.

It was part of the Gothic Line and the battle of Rimini in 1944, during World War II.
