= Sasso di Simone =

Limestone mountain in Italy

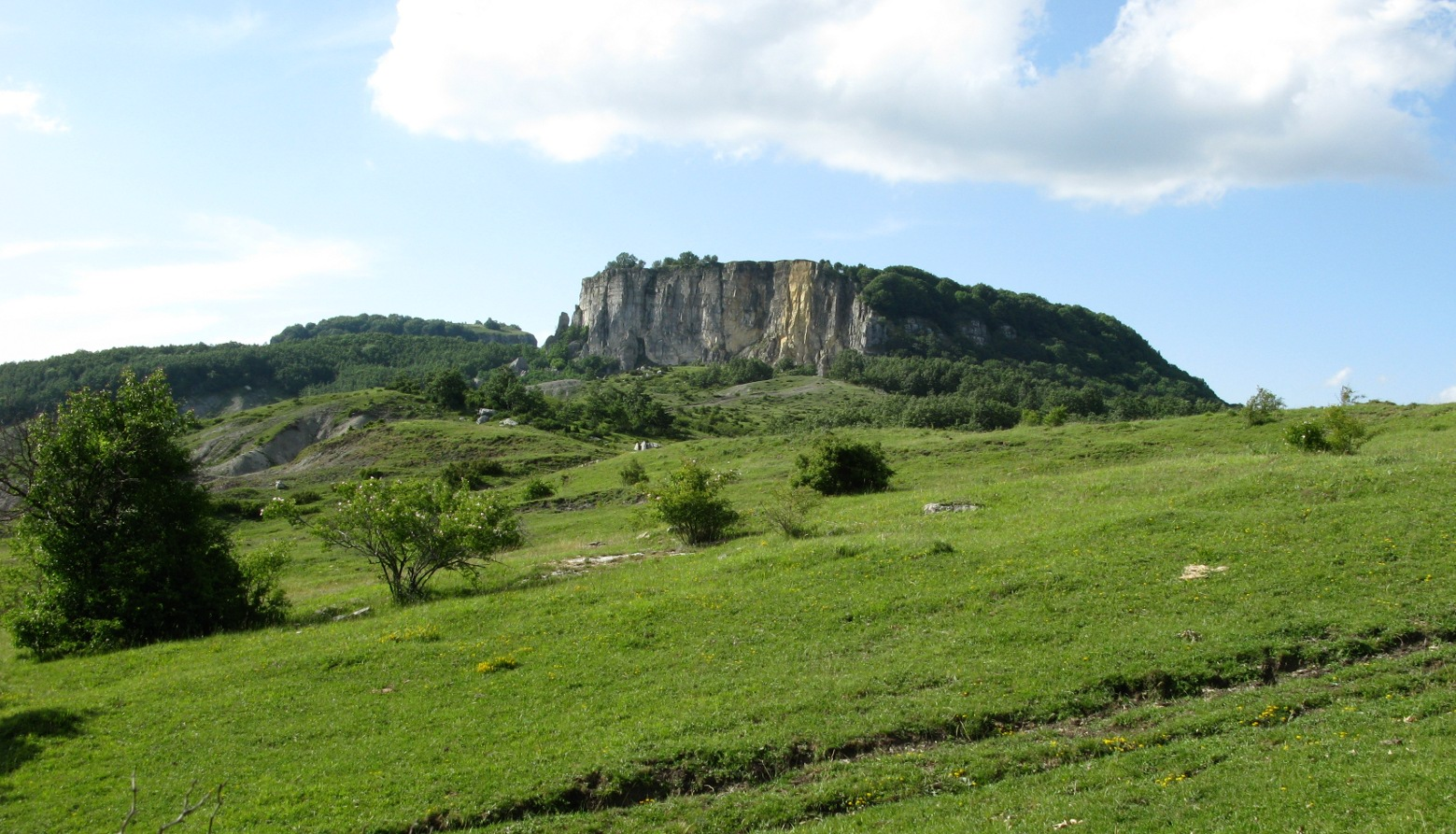
- View of the rocky cliff

Highest point
- Prominence: 177 m (581 ft)
- Isolation: 0.62 km (0.39 mi)
- Coordinates: 43°45′37″N 12°17′30″E

Geography
- Region: Tuscany
- Parent range: Tuscan-Romagnolo Apennines

The Sasso di Simone is a massive block of calcareous rock that rises like a regular parallelepiped from the mountains of the Tuscan-Romagnolo Apennines, reaching an altitude of 1,204 m (3,950 ft) a.s.l. and dominating the Montefeltro region. Today, it falls within the Sasso di Simone Nature Reserve between the Province of Arezzo (municipality of Sestino) and the Province of Pesaro and Urbino (municipality of Carpegna).

== History ==
Formed from Tertiary marine sediments, deposited in the northern Tyrrhenian Sea, it is a fragment of the Apennine rocky folds that, emerging from the sea and shifting from west to east, gradually fragmented and are now found in outcrops along the entire Apennine chain, from the Casentino to Monte Fumaiolo and up to the Adriatic Sea, ending to the north with the cliff of Monte Titano in San Marino.

=== Città del Sole ===
I came here to Mugello, where I gave instructions for what needs to be done in my absence, and from here I will go to Terra del Sole and Sasso di Simone, with the intention of not leaving until everything is completed, so that Your Serene Highness will not be troubled... And in any case, I will not fail to frequently visit the Sasso and there (Terra del Sole), so that both these constructions will be completed this year, provided Your Serene Highness assigns the necessary provisions to those responsible

— letter from Simone Genga to Grand Duke Francesco de' Medici in July 1577

Sasso di Simone was chosen by Cosimo I in 1565 as part of a political plan to defend and strengthen the state of Florence to build a city-fortress that would be called Città del Sole, a toponym similar to that of Terra del Sole, the other Medici city-fortress built in the Romagnolo territory. Indeed, Sasso di Simone represented a strategic node of the Grand Duchy of Tuscany in opposition to the castle of San Leo in Montefeltro. Designed by architects Giovanni Camerini and Simone Genga, it was used for nearly a century in its dual role as both a military and civilian city; however, due to adverse natural conditions and changing political circumstances, its construction was not completed, and the city was definitively abandoned by the end of the 17th century.

== Protected natural areas ==
Together with Monte Simoncello, it forms the Parco naturale regionale del Sasso Simone e Simoncello and is part of two SICs: Sasso Simone e Simoncello (IT5180008) and Monti Sasso Simone e Simoncello (IT5310003), respectively covering 1665 ha and 1190 ha.

The Sasso di Simone is also protected by another natural protected area, the Sasso di Simone Nature Reserve, a provincial reserve entirely within the Province of Arezzo, in Tuscany. The reserve was established in 1996 and covers an area of 1,604 ha.

== Flora ==
The flora of Sasso di Simone consists of forests (of the Mediterranean-montane type), pastures, meadows, shrubby grasslands, and thickets. The forests are primarily composed of white hornbeam, black hornbeam, and Turkey oak, covering approximately 800 hectares. Also present are maple, holly, beech, ash, hazel, service tree, whitebeam, and yew. In the undergrowth, wild ginger and mountain cornflower grow. On the summit grasslands, it is not uncommon to find the orange lily.

== Bibliography ==
- Coppi, Enrico (1993). La Fortificazione di Sasso Simone [The Fortification of Sasso di Simone] (in Italian).
- Renzi, Giancarlo (1993). "Mestieri e quartieri nella città-fortezza del Sasso di Simone in una relazione del 1644" [Trades and neighborhoods in the city-fortress of Sasso di Simone in a 1644 report]. Studi montefeltrani (in Italian). 17.
- Allegretti, Girolamo (1986). "Disfecemi Maremma. Note sulla disertata "città" del Sasso di Simone" [Disfecemi Maremma. Notes on the abandoned "city" of Sasso di Simone]. Studi montefeltrani (in Italian). 13.
- Potito, Amedeo (1971). "Premesse e documenti inediti per la storia della fortezza del Sasso Simone" [Premises and unpublished documents for the history of the Sasso di Simone fortress]. Studi montefeltrani (in Italian). 1.
- Renzi, Giancarlo (1998). "Le chiese del Sasso di Simone in età moderna" [The churches of Sasso di Simone in the modern era]. Studi montefeltrani (in Italian). 19.
- Ermeti, Anna Lia (1995). "Nuovi dati per la pre-protostoria dell'area del Sasso di Simone" [New data for the pre-protohistory of the Sasso di Simone area]. Studi montefeltrani (in Italian). 18.
- Giancarlo Renzi (ed.). Il Sasso di Simone - Scritti di naturalisti toscani del Settecento [Sasso di Simone - Writings of 18th-century Tuscan naturalists] (in Italian).
- Amedeo Potito, ed. (1972). La fortezza del Sasso di Simone - Carte e documenti [The fortress of Sasso di Simone - Maps and documents] (in Italian). Monografie Soc. di studi storici del Montefeltro.
