= Frontino =

Frontino can refer to:

- Frontino, Italy, a municipality in the province of Pesaro e Urbino (Marche), Italy
- Frontino, Antioquia, a municipality in the Antioquia Department of Colombia
- Frontino (horse), fictional horse in 15th-century literature
