= Sant'Angelo in Vado =

Italian comune

- Comune
- Comune di Sant'Angelo in Vado
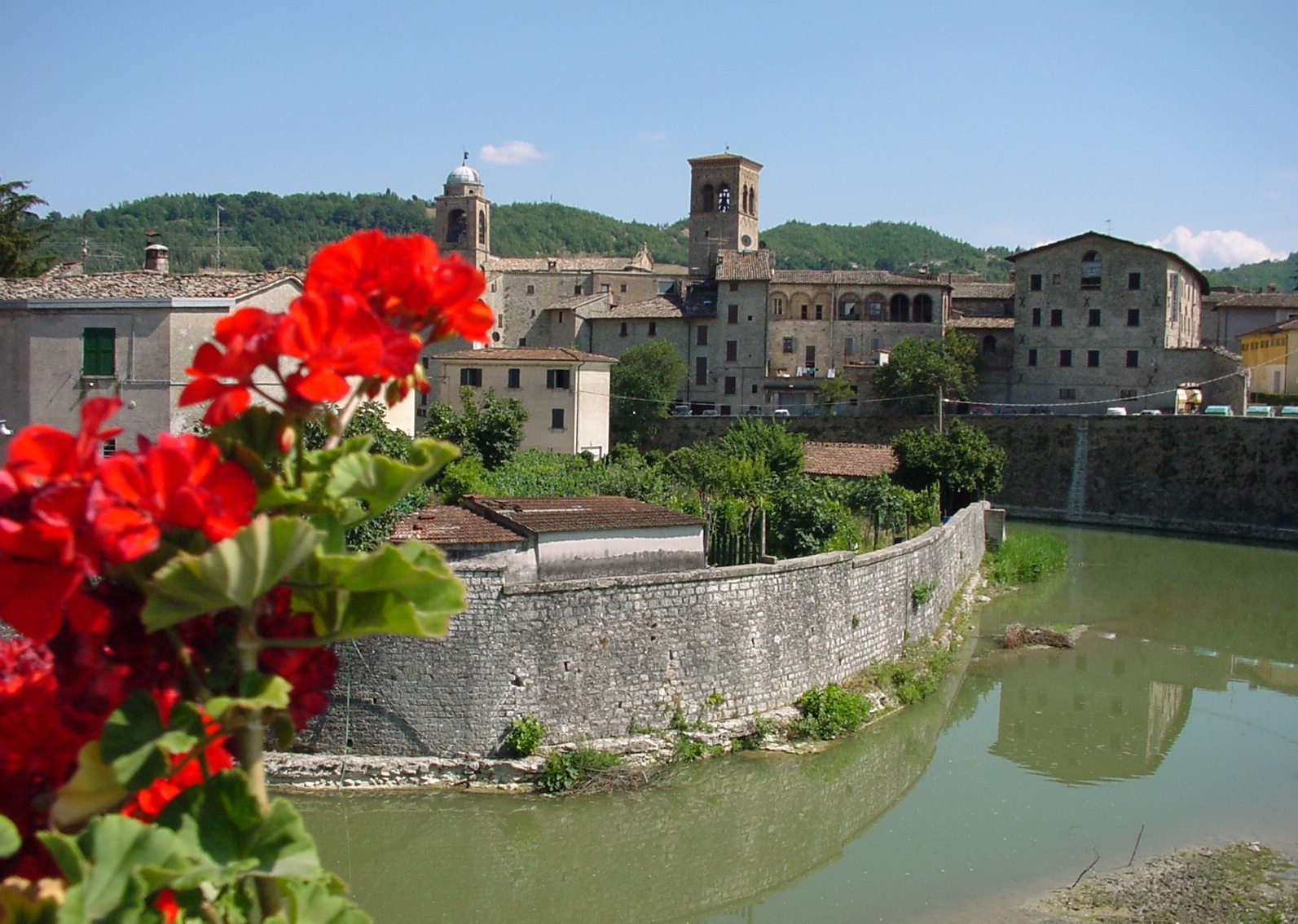
- View of Sant'Angelo in Vado and Metauro river

- Sant'Angelo within the Province of Pesaro e Urbino

- Location within Italy Location within Marche
- Coordinates: 43°39′51″N 12°24′41″E
- Country: Italy
- Region: Marche
- Province: Pesaro e Urbino

Area
  - Total: 67.34 km^{2} (26.00 sq mi)
- Elevation: 359 m (1,178 ft)

Population (December 2022)
  - Total: 3,892
  - Density: 57.80/km^{2} (149.7/sq mi)
- Time zone: UTC+1 (CET)
  - Summer (DST): UTC+2 (CEST)
- Website: www.comune.santangeloinvado.pu.it

Sant'Angelo in Vado is a comune (municipality) in the province of Pesaro and Urbino, in the Italian region of Marche.

== Geography ==
The municipality is about 90 kilometres (56 mi) west of Ancona and about 50 kilometres (31 mi) southwest of Pesaro. The Metauro river flows through it. It borders Apecchio, Belforte all'Isauro, Carpegna, Mercatello sul Metauro, Peglio, Piandimeleto, Urbania and Urbino.

== History ==
=== Roman era ===
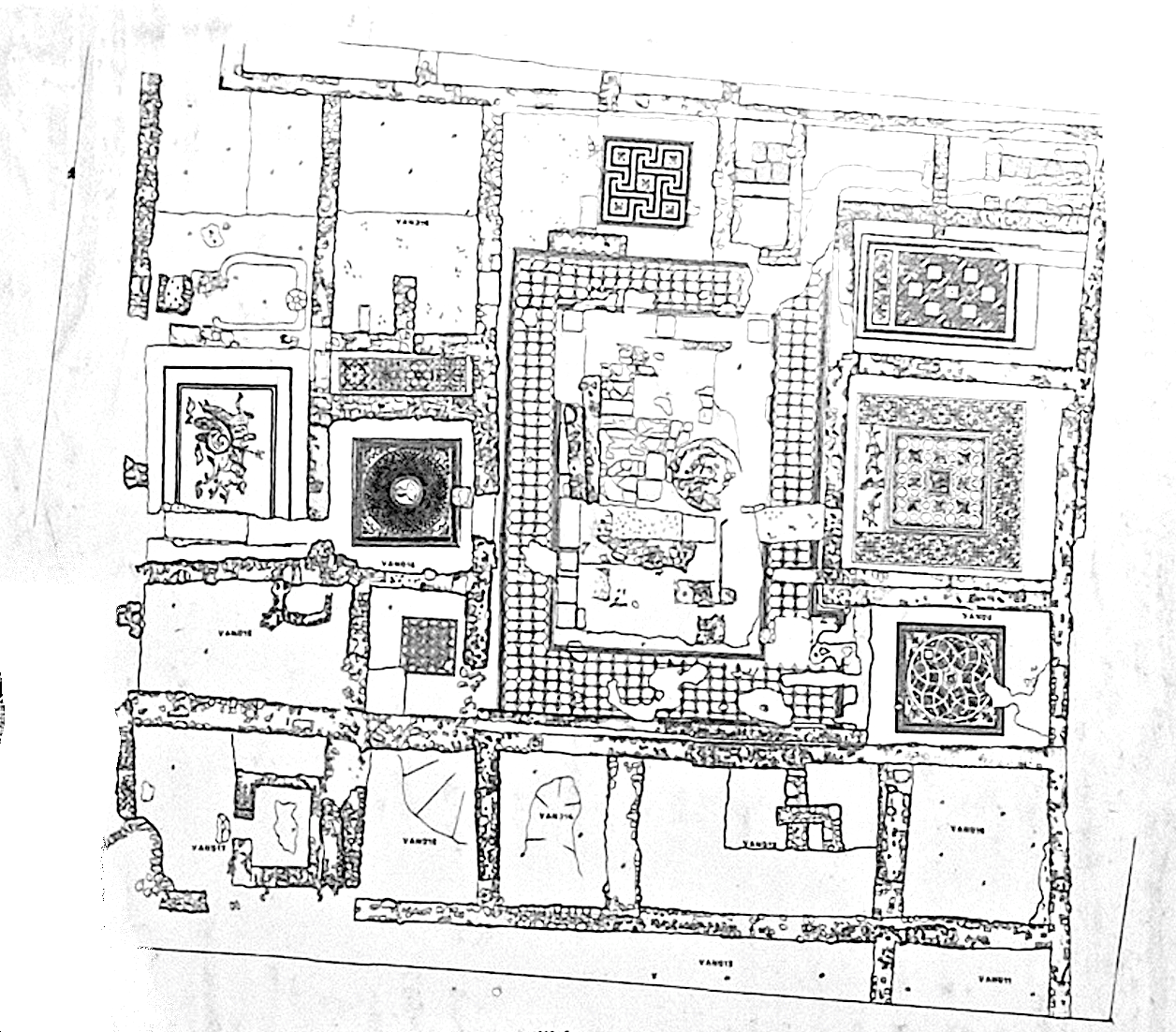
Plan of villa

The ancient Roman city of Tifernum Mataurense which lies underneath Sant'Angelo in Vado became a municipium at the beginning of the 1st century BC. The city was built on a grid with the main cardo maximus running past the public baths and terminating at a forum which lies beneath the former convent of Saint Catherine. The city grew particularly in the 1st and 3rd centuries AD with imperial financial support for many monumental buildings. Many remains of these are visible in the town.

==== Domus del Mito ====
The Domus del Mito excavated beginning in 2003 was a large noble house (domus) built towards the end of the 1st century AD. The Domus is one of the most important archaeological discoveries of the last 50 years.

It has an area of approximately 1,000 m^{2} (11,000 sq ft) and 27 rooms. It was embellished with a rich complex of monochrome and polychrome figurative mosaics of excellent quality and mostly splendidly preserved. They exhibit various subjects with many figures, mostly linked to classical mythology, which have given it the name "Domus del Mito" (house of myths). The mosaics indicate the inclusion of the city in the circuit of specialised mosaic workers, and of cultured and refined owners. Among the themes depicted are particularly: Neptune and Amphitrite on the triumphal chariot pulled by sea horses followed by Dionysus, god of wine and then arriving at the petrifying face of Medusa. Another spectacular room is the triclinium in which a hunting and fishing scene are depicted surrounded by a festive repertoire of black and white geometric motifs.

===== Description =====
The Domus is located in the "Campo della Pieve". The Roman street was to the West of the house along a N/S axis and the entrance (vestibulum) was in room 6 with the Triumph of Neptune mosaic. From there the visitor would pass over a sandstone threshold and along a corridor with a mosaic floor depicting four two-tone geometric squares except for a pink floral element (room 20). This leads to the atrium-peristyle and to rooms 19 and 16, probably the tablinum next to which was a bedroom (cubiculum) in which is a geometric mosaic whose design is off-centre and depicting the face of Bacchus.

From the corridor of the atrium, with a geometric mosaic with hexagons alternating with rhombuses, the dining room (triclinium) was reached from two other rooms, arranged symmetrically to the north and south, also used during banquets or meetings. In the triclinium is a hunting scene with fishing scene in the centre surrounded by many zoomorphic and mythological figures and a festive repertoire of black and white geometric motifs.

In the adjacent room to the south is a mosaic with the face of Medusa inside a hexagon while in the north room a mosaic in the form of a carpet to the west of which is a rectangle with pairs of animals. Rooms 23 and 24 are baths and a changing room area and perhaps room 21 (monochrome geometric mosaic) was used for the relaxation of guests. The rooms without flooring along the southern side are for domestic activities and in which loom weights and needles were recovered. Room 7 in the N/W corner along the road seems to have been used as a kitchen and subsequently for artisanal production of ceramics.

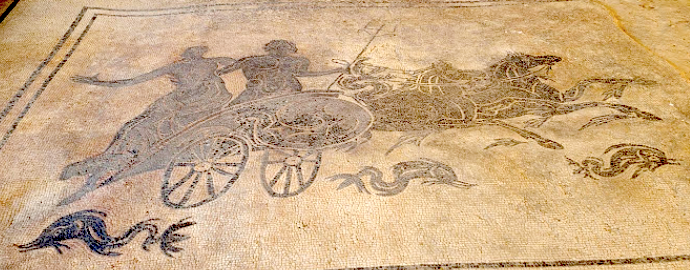
Neptune and Amphitrite mosaic

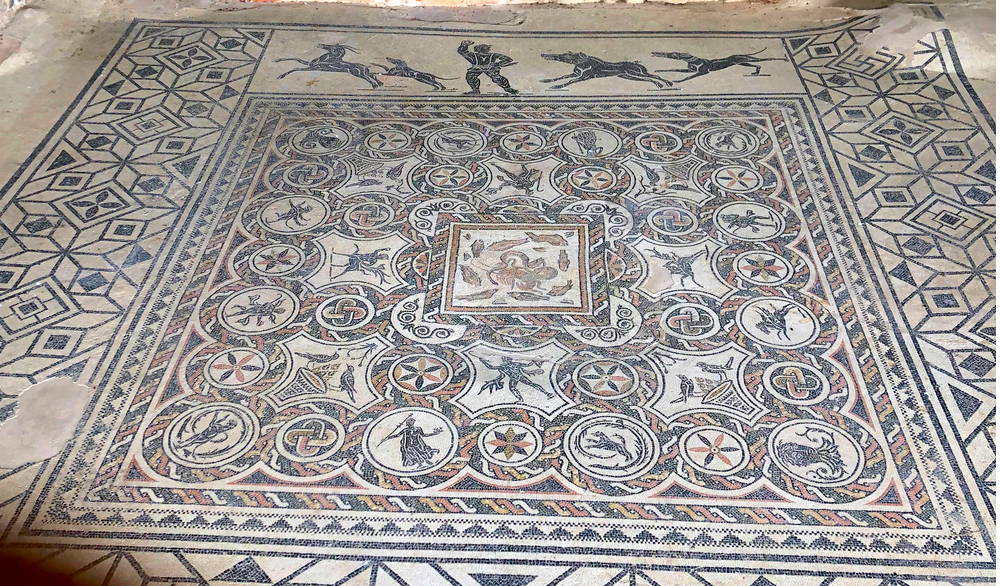
Triclinium mosaic

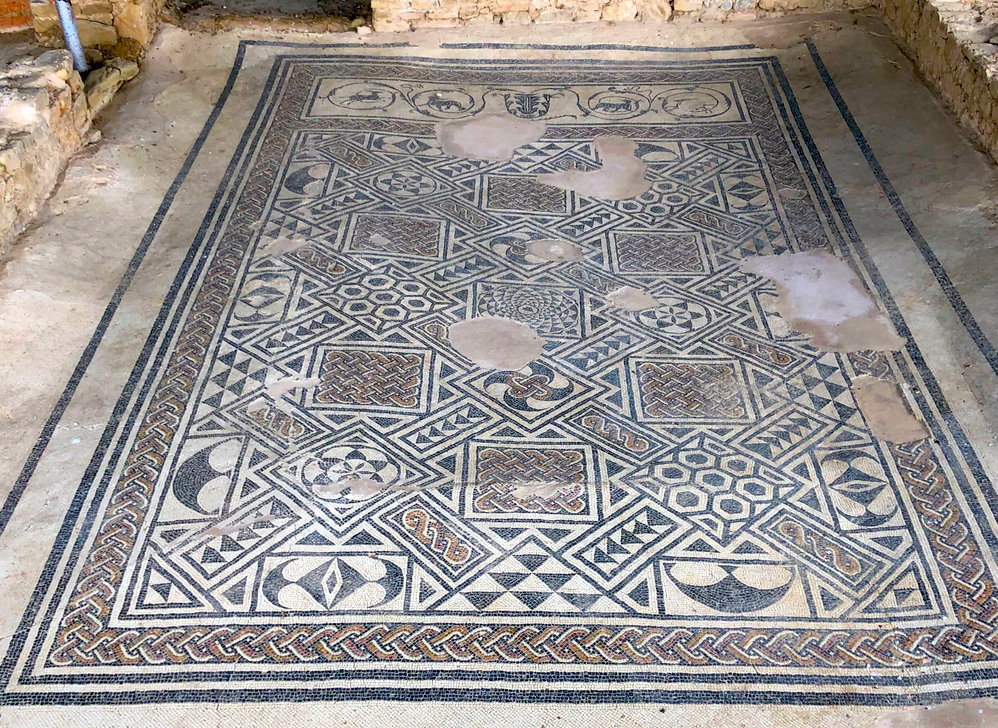

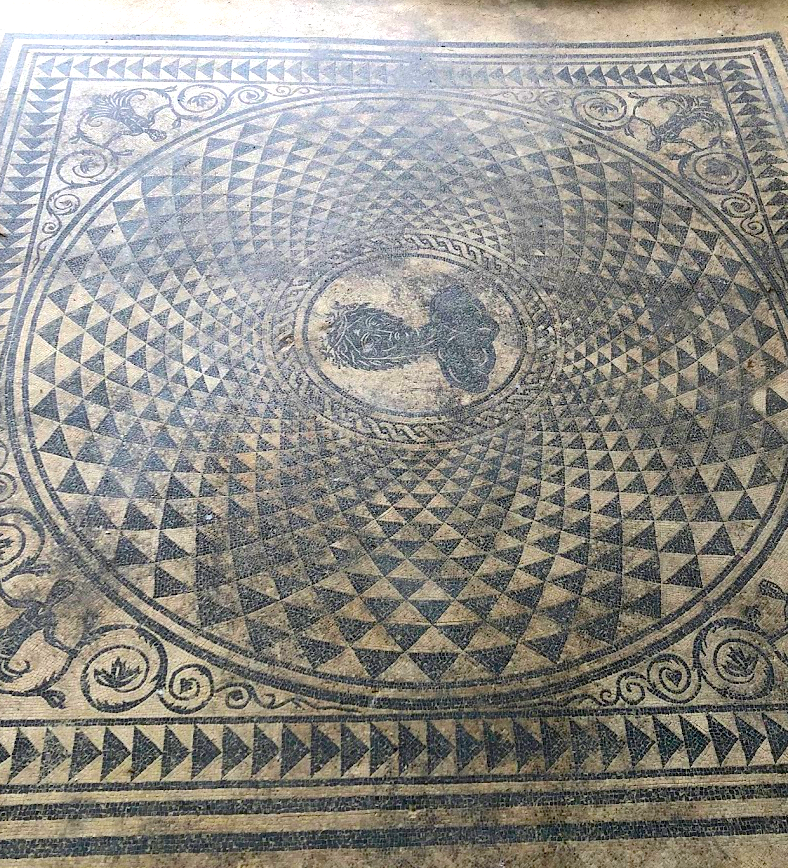
Mosaic of the bust of Dionysus

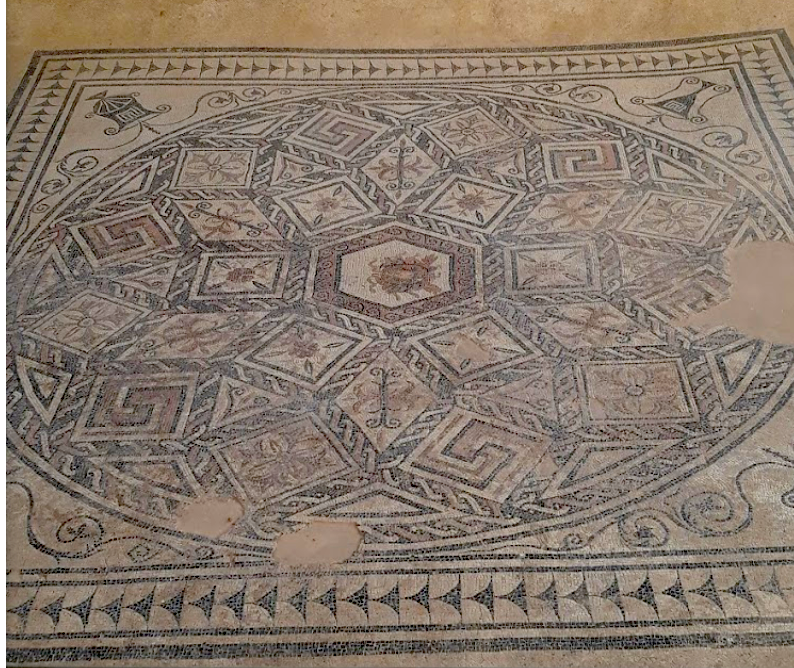
Medusa mosaic

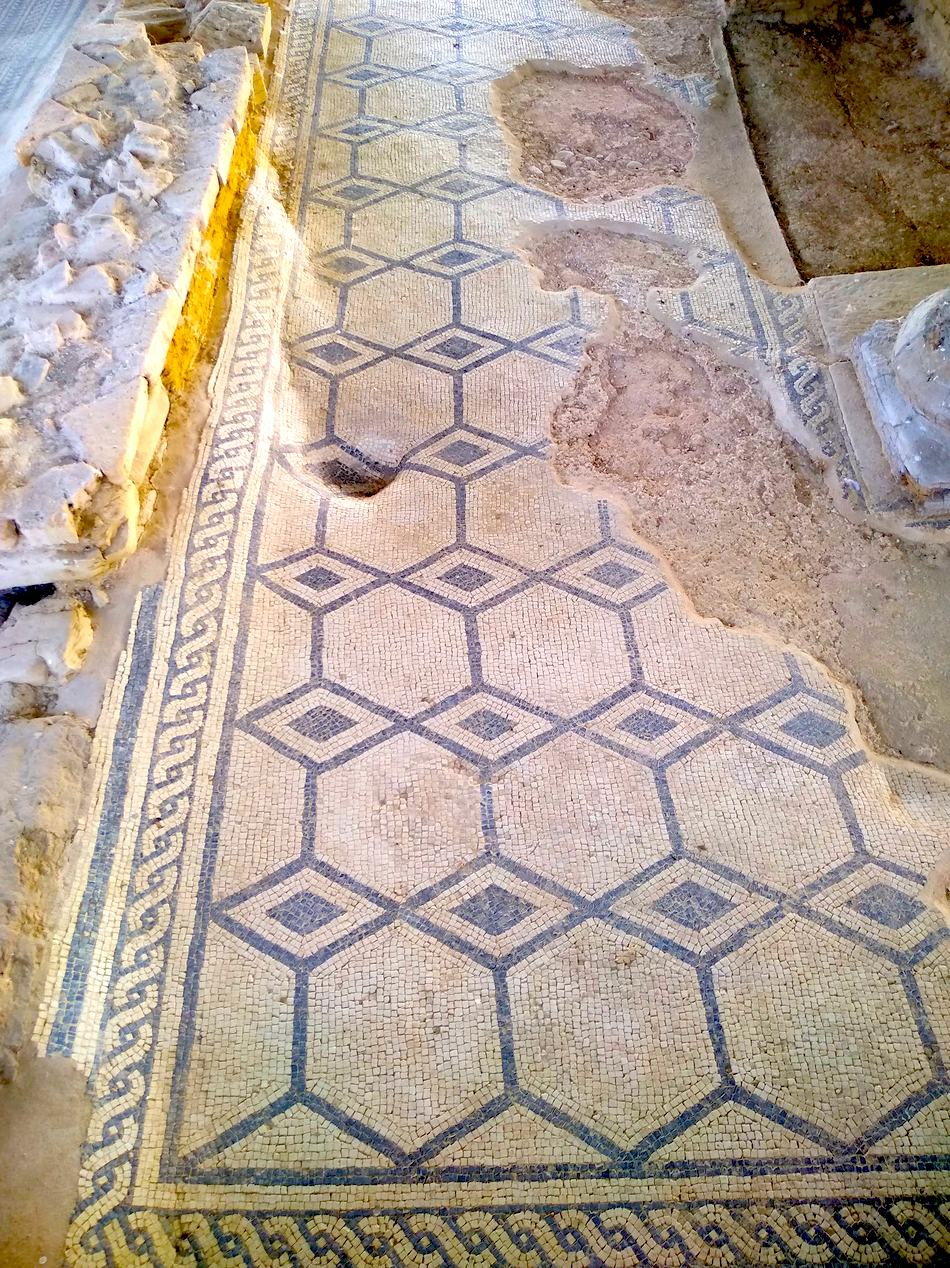
mosaic of atrium

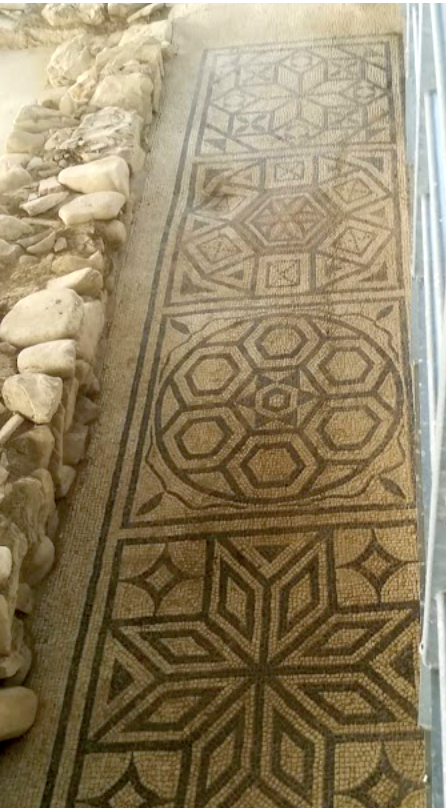
Room 20 mosaic

=== Post-Roman era ===
There were two periods when there was a Roman Catholic Diocese of Sant'Angelo in Vado, although the Diocese has been suppressed since 1986.

== Notable people ==
- Federico Zuccari (1540–1609), painter and architect
- Taddeo Zuccari (1529–66), painter
- Lucian Ercolani (1888-1976), furniture designer

== Sports ==
The town is represented by Vadese Calcio, an amateur football (soccer) club founded in 1952, mainly competing in Eccellenza, Promozione and Serie D. Its colors are yellow and red.

== Twinning ==
Sant'Angelo in Vado has been twinned with Mar del Plata, Argentina, since 1998.
