= Simone Genga =

- Born: 1530; Urbino, Duchy of Urbino
- Died: after 1596
- Occupations: Military engineer, architect
- Employer: House of Medici

Simone Genga (born 1530 – died after 1596) was an Italian military engineer and architect active in the service of the Medici Grand Dukes of Tuscany during the second half of the sixteenth century. He is chiefly known for his work on major Tuscan fortifications, including the fortress-cities of Terra del Sole and Sasso di Simone, and for later service in the Polish–Lithuanian Commonwealth and Transylvania.

== Life and career ==
Genga was born in Urbino in 1530, the son of Andrea Genga, a steward and agent of Duke Guidobaldo II della Rovere, and Caterina Bavieri. By about the age of twenty he had entered the service of the Medici in Florence as a military engineer.

During the reigns of Cosimo I de' Medici and Francesco I de' Medici, he participated in an extensive programme of military construction in the Grand Duchy of Tuscany. Initially collaborating with Giovanni Camerini and Baldassarre Lanci, he later became superintendent of several fortress projects following their deaths. Among his principal works were the fortress-city of Terra del Sole in the Tuscan-Romagnol frontier region and the fortified settlement of Sasso di Simone in Montefeltro. He also supervised work on the fortifications of San Martino in Mugello, Grosseto and Radicofani.

In 1584 Genga left Tuscany to enter the service of King Stephen Báthory of Poland. He spent several years in the Polish–Lithuanian Commonwealth and is reported to have worked on the fortifications of Riga. After Báthory's death in 1586, Genga attempted unsuccessfully to secure further appointments and promoted the candidacy of Grand Duke Francesco I de' Medici for the Polish throne.

Around 1591 he entered the service of Prince Sigismund Báthory in Transylvania. Contemporary sources suggest that he acted not only as a military engineer but also as a trusted adviser at court. His last known letter from Alba Iulia dates from September 1596. He probably returned to Italy shortly afterwards and is believed to have died soon thereafter.
