= Sestino =

- Comune
- Comune di Sestino
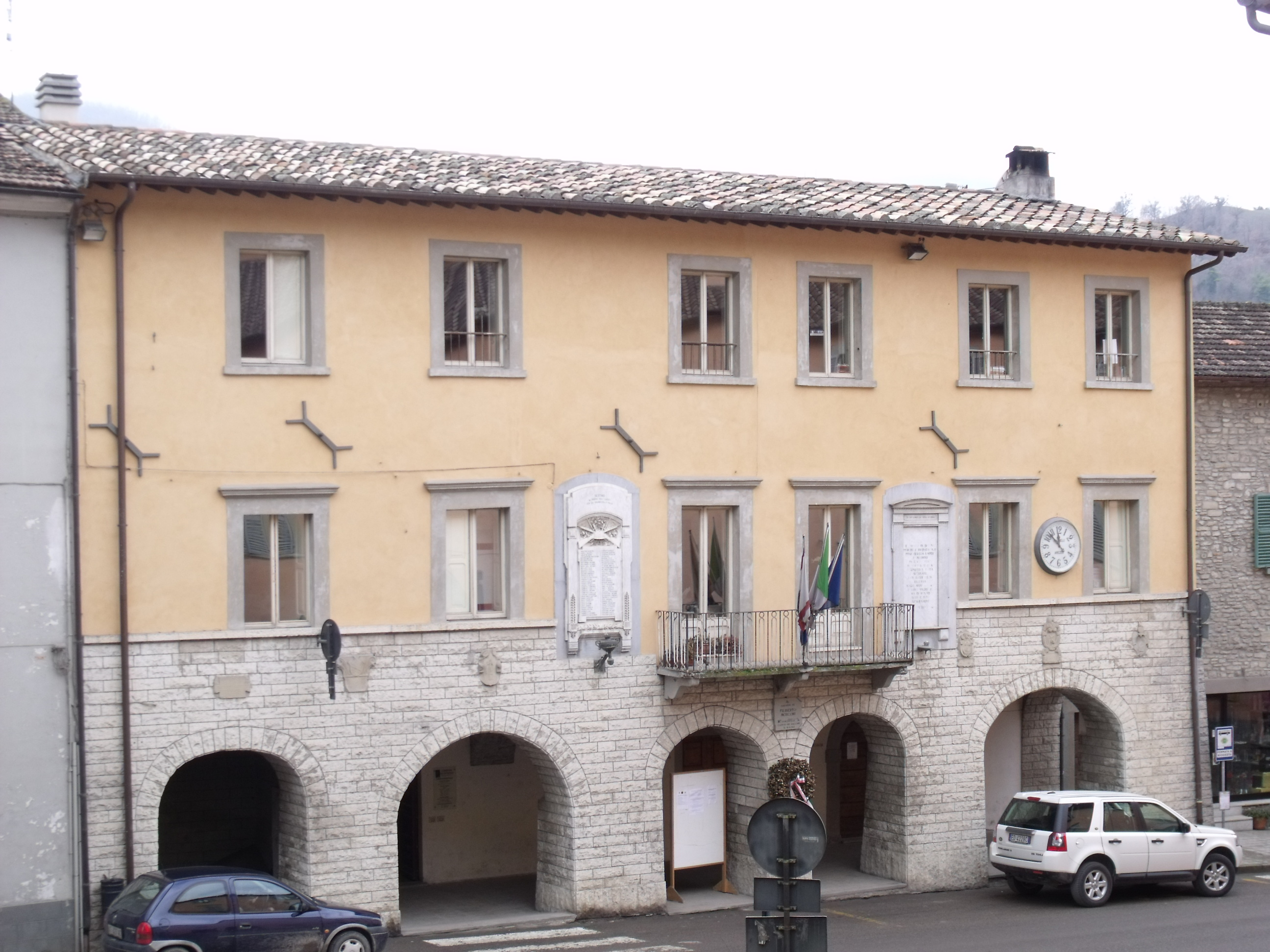
- The town hall of Sestino

- Location within Italy Location within Tuscany
- Coordinates: 43°43′N 12°18′E
- Country: Italy
- Region: Tuscany
- Province: Arezzo (AR)
- Frazioni: Calbuffa, Casale, Case Barboni, Colcellalto, Lucemburgo, Martigliano, Monteromano, Monterone, Motolano, Palazzi, Ponte Presale, Petrella Massana, Presciano, San Donato, Valdiceci di Sopra, Ville di Sopra

Government
  - Mayor: Giancarlo Renzi

Area
  - Total: 80.22 km^{2} (30.97 sq mi)
- Elevation: 496 m (1,627 ft)

Population (30 June 2017)
  - Total: 1,231
  - Density: 15.35/km^{2} (39.74/sq mi)
- Demonym: Sestinesi
- Time zone: UTC+1 (CET)
  - Summer (DST): UTC+2 (CEST)
- Postal code: 52038
- Dialing code: 0575
- Website: Official website

Sestino is a comune (municipality) in the province of Arezzo in the Italian region Tuscany, located about 110 kilometres (68 miles) east of Florence and about 75 km (47 mi) northeast of Arezzo.

Sestino borders the following municipalities: Badia Tedalda, Belforte all'Isauro, Borgo Pace, Carpegna, Casteldelci, Mercatello sul Metauro, Pennabilli, Piandimeleto.

The source of the Foglia river is located near Sestino.

== Main sights ==
- Church of San Michele, in the frazione of Casale, built probably over a Roman edifice. Notable is the apse, with panels having high-reliefs with symbolic decorations in Romanesque style (12th century).
- Church of San Gianni in Vecchio, in the frazione San Gianni. Known from 1297, it includes a pre-existing, pre-Romanesque church with a nave and an apse. It has a square bell tower with mullioned windows.
- Pieve di San Pancrazio (9th-10th century), built over the Roman Curia Augusta. Of the original medieval edifice the crypt survives, with walls decorated by blind arches and columns and High Middle Ages sculptures. The Romanesque apse is from the 12th century, while the façade was remade in the late 17th century and the two aisles were suppressed in 1784. Notable is also the sandstone altar (1259) supported by a Roman cippus (374)
- Sasso di Simone, a block of calcareous rock in the Sasso di Simone Nature Reserve.
