= Belforte all'Isauro =

- Comune
- Comune di Belforte all'Isauro
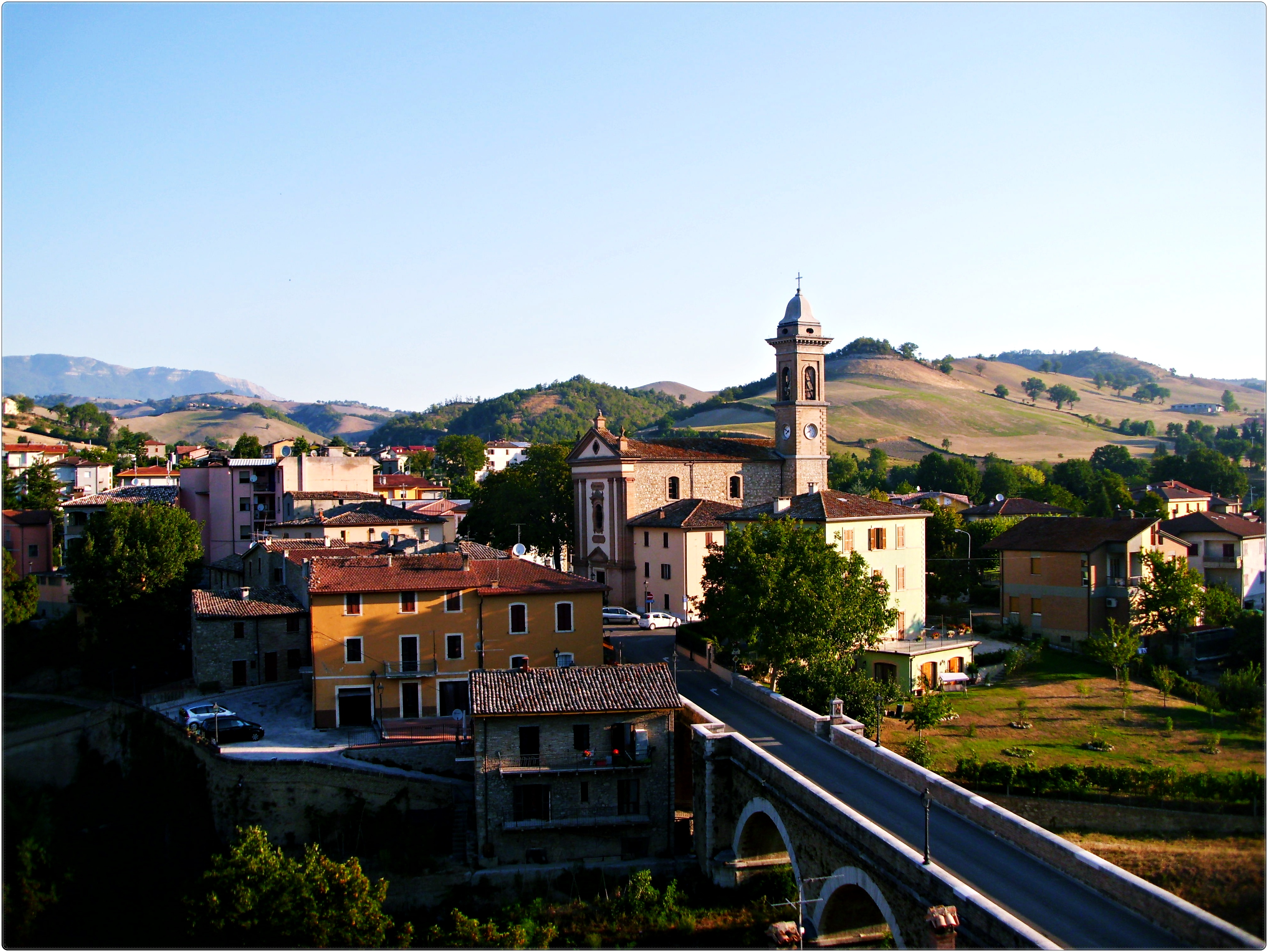
- View of Belforte all'Isauro

- Flag Coat of arms

- Location within Italy Location within Marche
- Coordinates: 43°43′N 12°22′E
- Country: Italy
- Region: Marche
- Province: Pesaro e Urbino (PU)

Government
  - Mayor: Pier Paolo Pagliardini

Area
  - Total: 12.0 km^{2} (4.6 sq mi)
- Elevation: 344 m (1,129 ft)

Population (31 July 2017)
  - Total: 735
  - Density: 61.2/km^{2} (159/sq mi)
- Demonym: Belfortini
- Time zone: UTC+1 (CET)
  - Summer (DST): UTC+2 (CEST)
- Postal code: 61020
- Dialing code: 0722
- Patron saint: St. Lawrence
- Saint day: 10 August

Belforte all'Isauro is a comune (municipality) in the Province of Pesaro e Urbino in the Italian region Marche, located about 90 kilometres (56 mi) west of Ancona and about 50 kilometres (31 mi) southwest of Pesaro.

Belforte all'Isauro borders the following municipalities: Carpegna, Piandimeleto, Sant'Angelo in Vado, Sestino.
