= Pietrarubbia =

- Comune
- Comune di Pietrarubbia
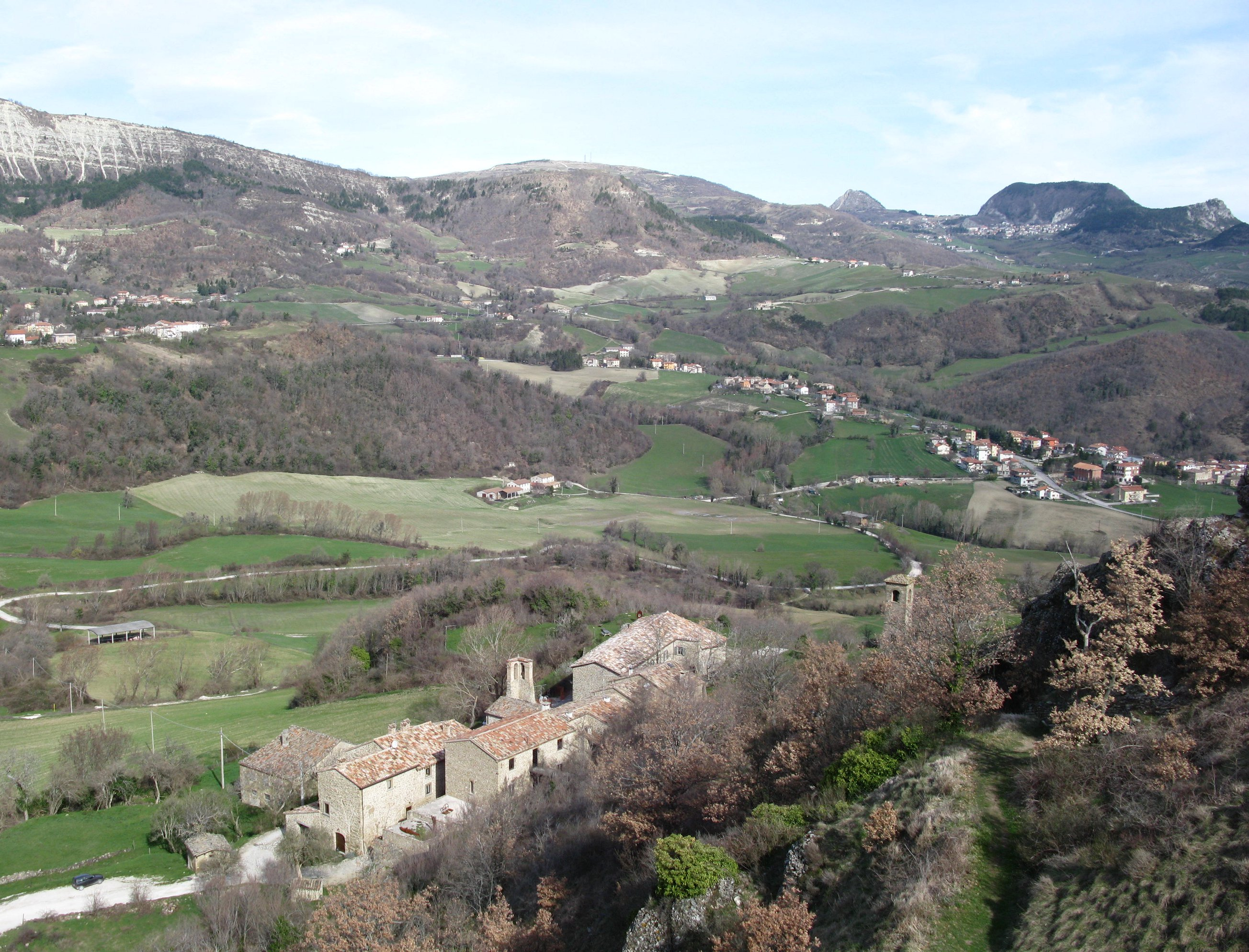
- View of Pietrarubbia

- Coat of arms

- Location within Italy Location within Marche
- Coordinates: 43°48′N 12°23′E
- Country: Italy
- Region: Marche
- Province: Pesaro e Urbino (PU)
- Frazioni: La Badia, Ca' Baldissera, Ca' Bartolino, Ca' Boso, Ca' Carbone, Ca' Ivano, Ca' Maluccio, Ca' Mancino, Ca' Volanino, Lago del Conte, Mercato Vecchio, Pontecappuccini, Villa del Piano.

Government
  - Mayor: Luciano Vergari

Area
  - Total: 13.0 km^{2} (5.0 sq mi)
- Elevation: 572 m (1,877 ft)

Population (2008)
  - Total: 718
  - Density: 55.2/km^{2} (143/sq mi)
- Demonym: Pietrarubbiesi
- Time zone: UTC+1 (CET)
  - Summer (DST): UTC+2 (CEST)
- Postal code: 61020
- Dialing code: 0722
- Patron saint: St. Anthony of Padua
- Saint day: 13 June
- Website: Official website

Pietrarubbia is a comune (municipality) in the Province of Pesaro e Urbino in the Italian region Marche, located about 90 kilometres (56 mi) west of Ancona and about 45 kilometres (28 mi) southwest of Pesaro.

It is home to an 11th-century castle which, according to tradition, is the ancestral home of the house of Montefeltro, rulers of the area in the Middle Ages and the Renaissance.

Neighboring municipalities: Carpegna, Frontino, Macerata Feltria, Montecopiolo, Piandimeleto.
