= Piandimeleto =

- Comune
- Comune di Piandimeleto
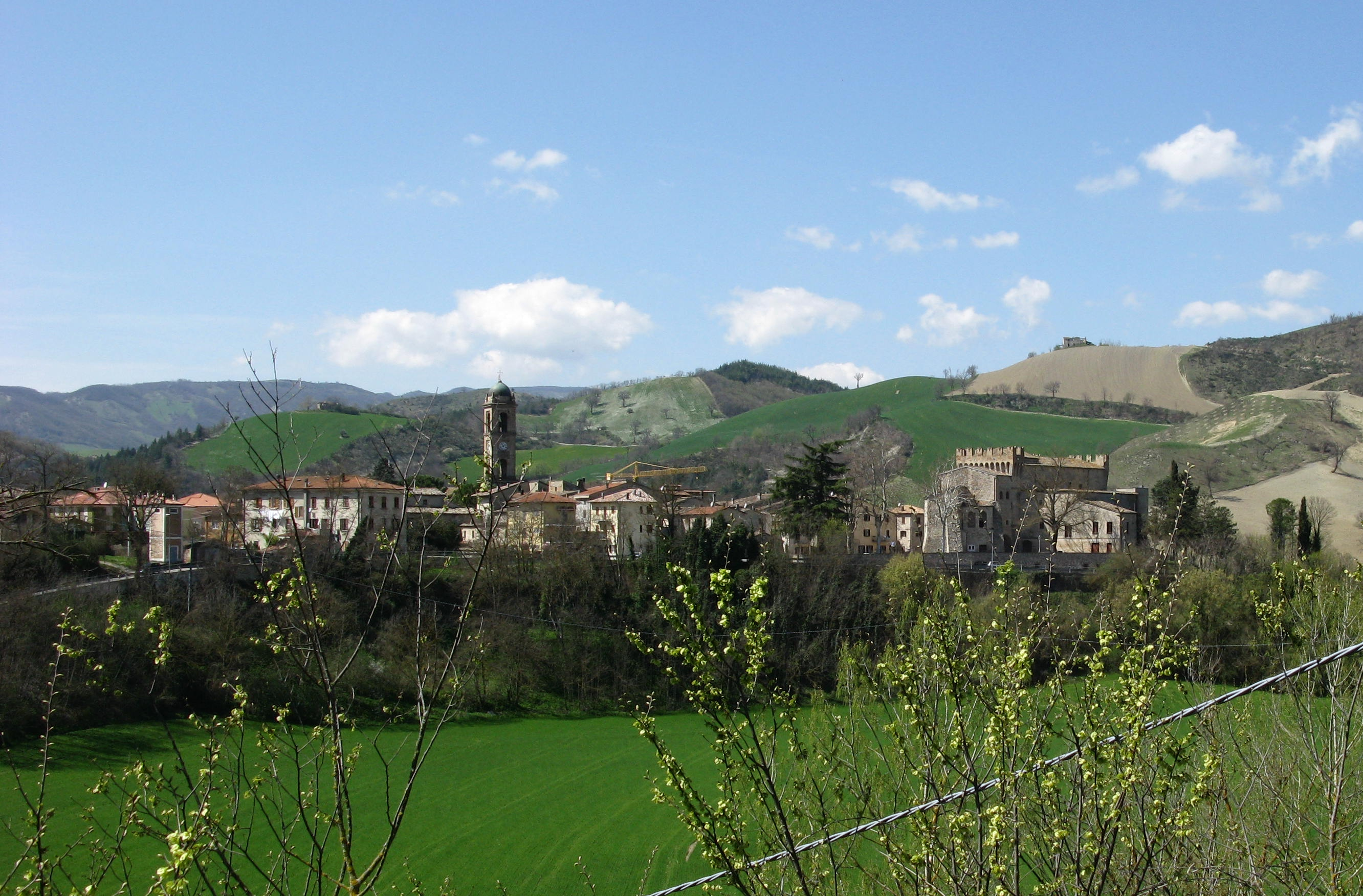
- View of Piandimeleto

- Coat of arms

- Location within Italy Location within Marche
- Coordinates: 43°44′N 12°25′E
- Country: Italy
- Region: Marche
- Province: Pesaro e Urbino (PU)

Government
  - Mayor: Veronica Magnani

Area
  - Total: 39.9 km^{2} (15.4 sq mi)
- Elevation: 319 m (1,047 ft)

Population (31 October 2020)
  - Total: 2,137
  - Density: 53.6/km^{2} (139/sq mi)
- Demonym: Pianmeletesi
- Time zone: UTC+1 (CET)
  - Summer (DST): UTC+2 (CEST)
- Postal code: 61026
- Dialing code: 0722
- Patron saint: St. Blaise
- Saint day: 3 February
- Website: Official website

Piandimeleto is a comune (municipality) in the Province of Pesaro e Urbino in the Italian region Marche, located about 90 kilometres (56 mi) west of Ancona and about 45 kilometres (28 mi) southwest of Pesaro.

Piandimeleto borders the following municipalities: Belforte all'Isauro, Carpegna, Frontino, Lunano, Macerata Feltria, Pietrarubbia, Sant'Angelo in Vado, Sassocorvaro Auditore, Sestino, Urbino. Its territory is included in the Sasso Simone and Simoncello Regional Park. The Foglia river flows near the town.

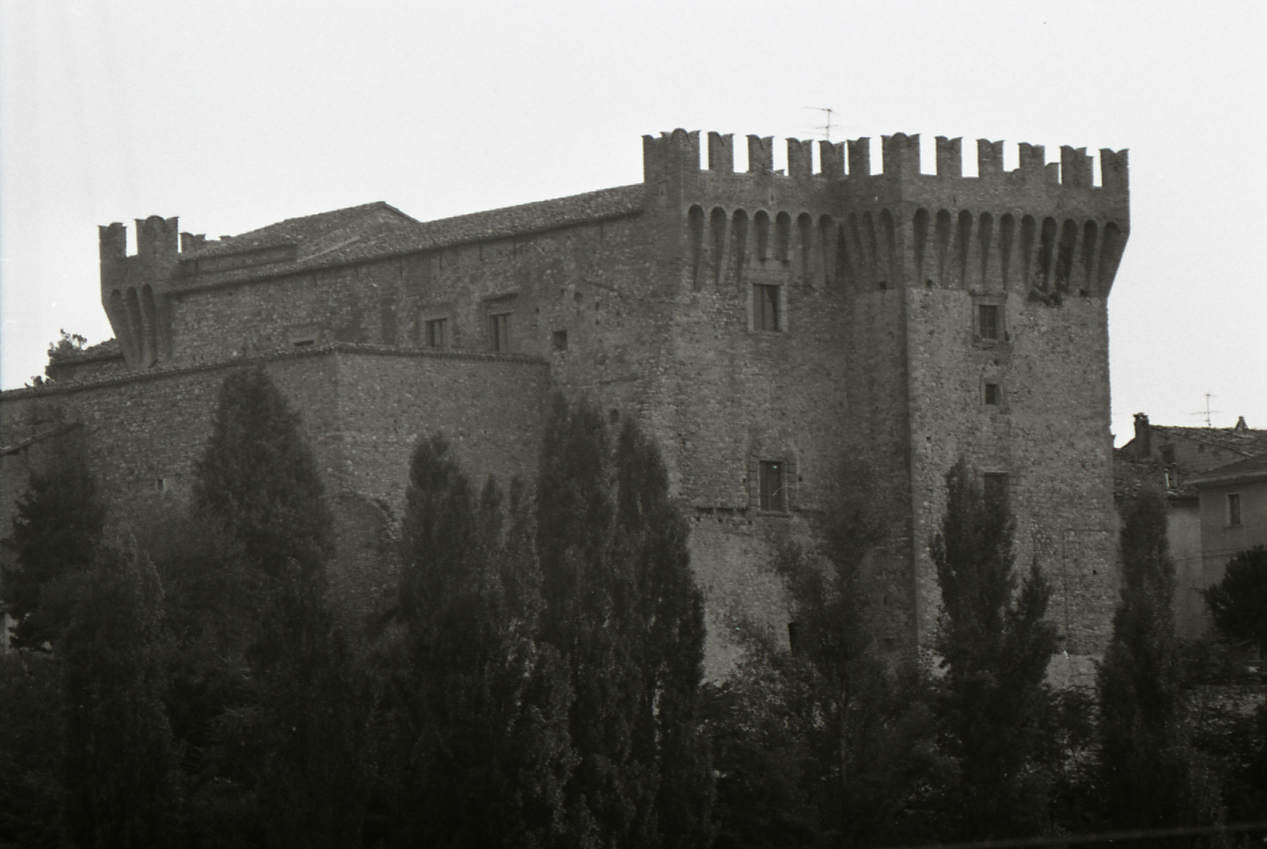
1981 photo by Paolo Monti
