= Carpegna =

- Comune
- Comune di Carpegna
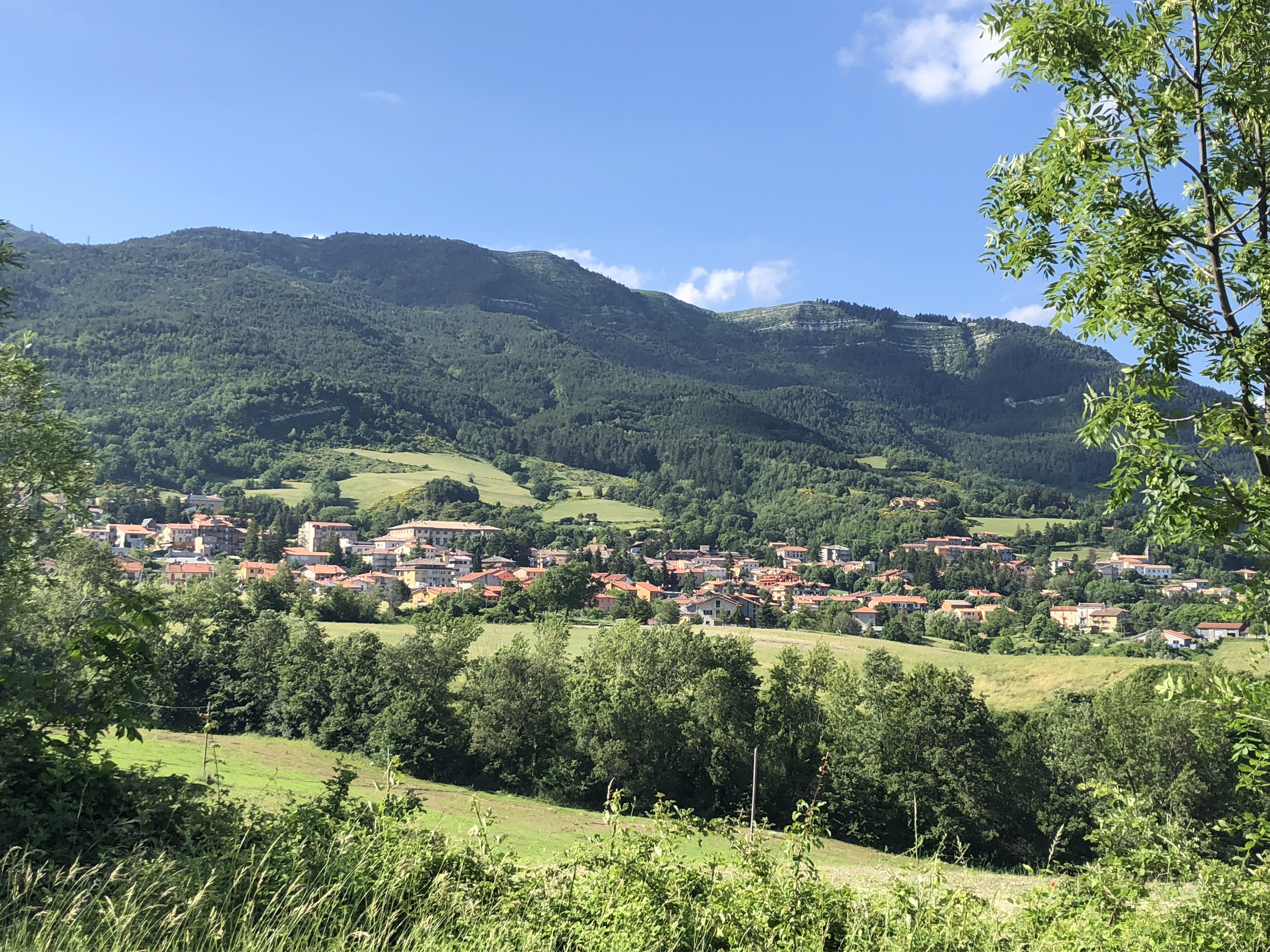
- View of Carpegna

- Coat of arms

- Location within Italy Location within Marche
- Coordinates: 43°47′N 12°20′E
- Country: Italy
- Region: Marche
- Province: Pesaro e Urbino (PU)
- Frazioni: Genghe, Le Frazioni, Pietrino

Government
  - Mayor: Angelo Francioni

Area
  - Total: 28.3 km^{2} (10.9 sq mi)

Population (28 February 2009)
  - Total: 1,673
  - Density: 59.1/km^{2} (153/sq mi)
- Demonym: Carpegnoli
- Time zone: UTC+1 (CET)
  - Summer (DST): UTC+2 (CEST)
- Postal code: 61021
- Dialing code: 0722
- Website: Official website

Carpegna is a comune (municipality) in the Province of Pesaro e Urbino in the Italian region Marche, located about 100 kilometres (62 mi) west of Ancona and about 50 kilometres (31 mi) southwest of Pesaro.

Carpegna borders the following municipalities: Belforte all'Isauro, Borgo Pace, Frontino, Mercatello sul Metauro, Montecopiolo, Pennabilli, Piandimeleto, Pietrarubbia, Sant'Angelo in Vado, Sestino.

The Monte Carpegna nearby is a ski resort. The communal territory is included in the Sasso Simone and Simoncello Regional Park.

== History ==
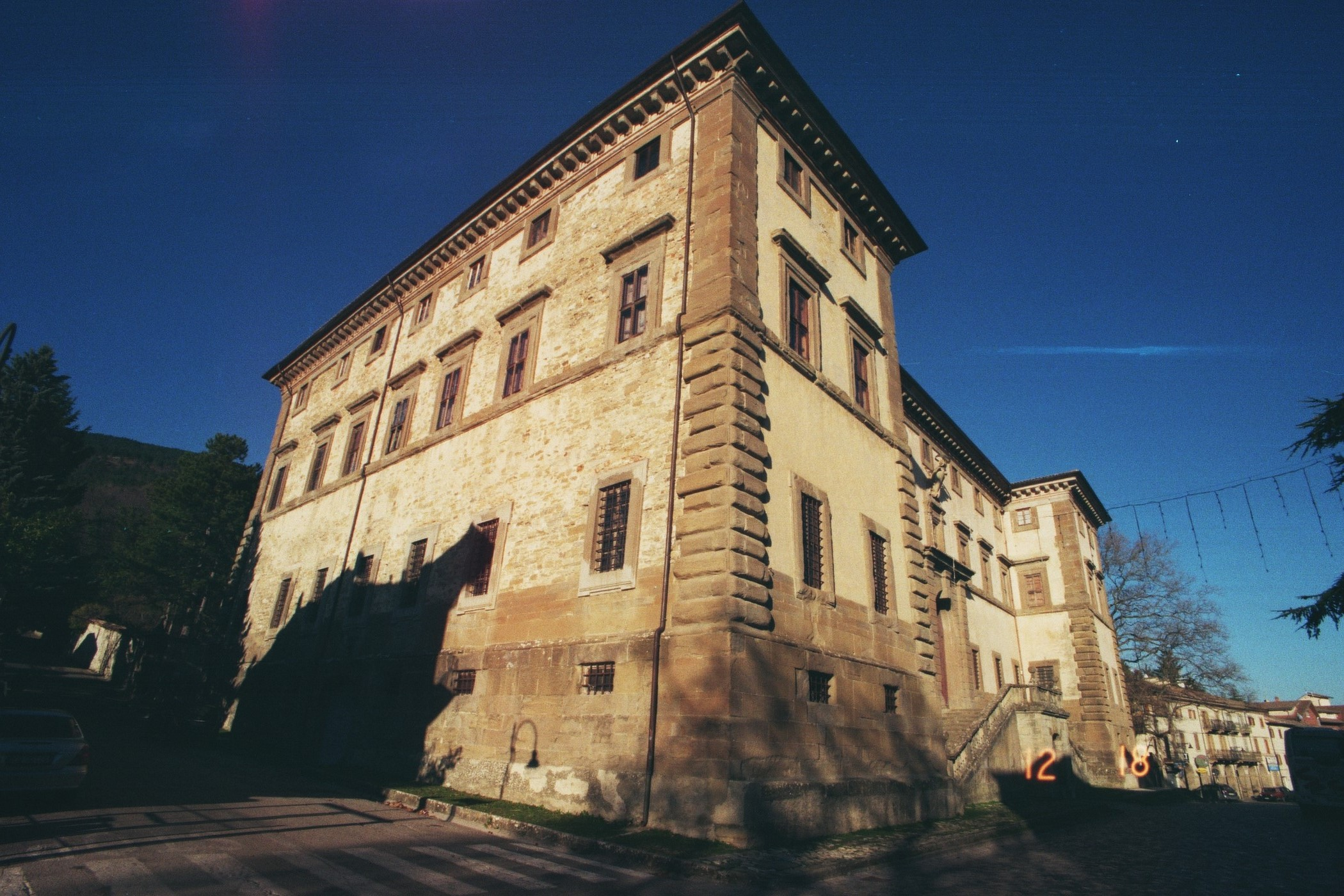
Palazzo dei Principi of Carpegna

According to legend, Odoacer gave Carpegna to his follower Armileone in 466. An assumed descendant of the latter, Ulderic of Carpegna, received the fief of Carpegna and other properties in the Montefeltro and Romagna regions from Otto I, Holy Roman Emperor. The lords and counts (as such first mentioned in 1238) of Carpegna acquired more than 30 castles and towns in the region. They split into the Carpegna-Gattara and the Carpegna-Pietracuta branches, which in the struggles between papal and imperial followers (Guelphs and Ghibellines) took opposite sides. Two other side branches of the House of Carpegna played more important roles in Italian history: the House of Malatesta (lords of Rimini) and the House of Montefeltro (lords and dukes of Urbino).

The Carpegna-Gattara branch extinguished in 1409, and in 1463 the family split again into the Counts of Carpegna (ruling Carpegna, Castellaccia, Palazzo Corignano and Torre dei Fossati) and the Counts of Gattara-Scavolino (ruling Gattara, Bascio, Miratoio and Scavolino). Both territories had Imperial immediacy in the Kingdom of Italy. The Gattara county was elevated to the rank of principality in 1685. In 1749 the Carpegna branch extinguished in the male line and was inherited by the marquesses Gabrielli-Carpegna who mainly lived in Rome and, after an interruption of their ruling status in the Napoleonic Kingdom of Italy, also inherited the principality of Gattara-Scavolino in 1817. Two years later however, both territories became parts of the Papal States.

The Princes di Carpegna-Falconieri-Gabrielli still today own the princely palace at Carpegna.

== Twin towns – Sister cities ==
Carpegna is twinned with:

- Mount Olive, New Jersey, United States (since 21 July 2018) – The twinning ceremony, attended by Mayor Rob Greenbaum of Mount Olive and Mayor Angelo Francioni of Carpegna, included the symbolic presentation of a sculptural work by the Italian artist Andrea da Montefeltro, offered as a cultural bridge between the two communities.
