= Frontino, Marche =

Frontino
- Comune
- Comune di Frontino
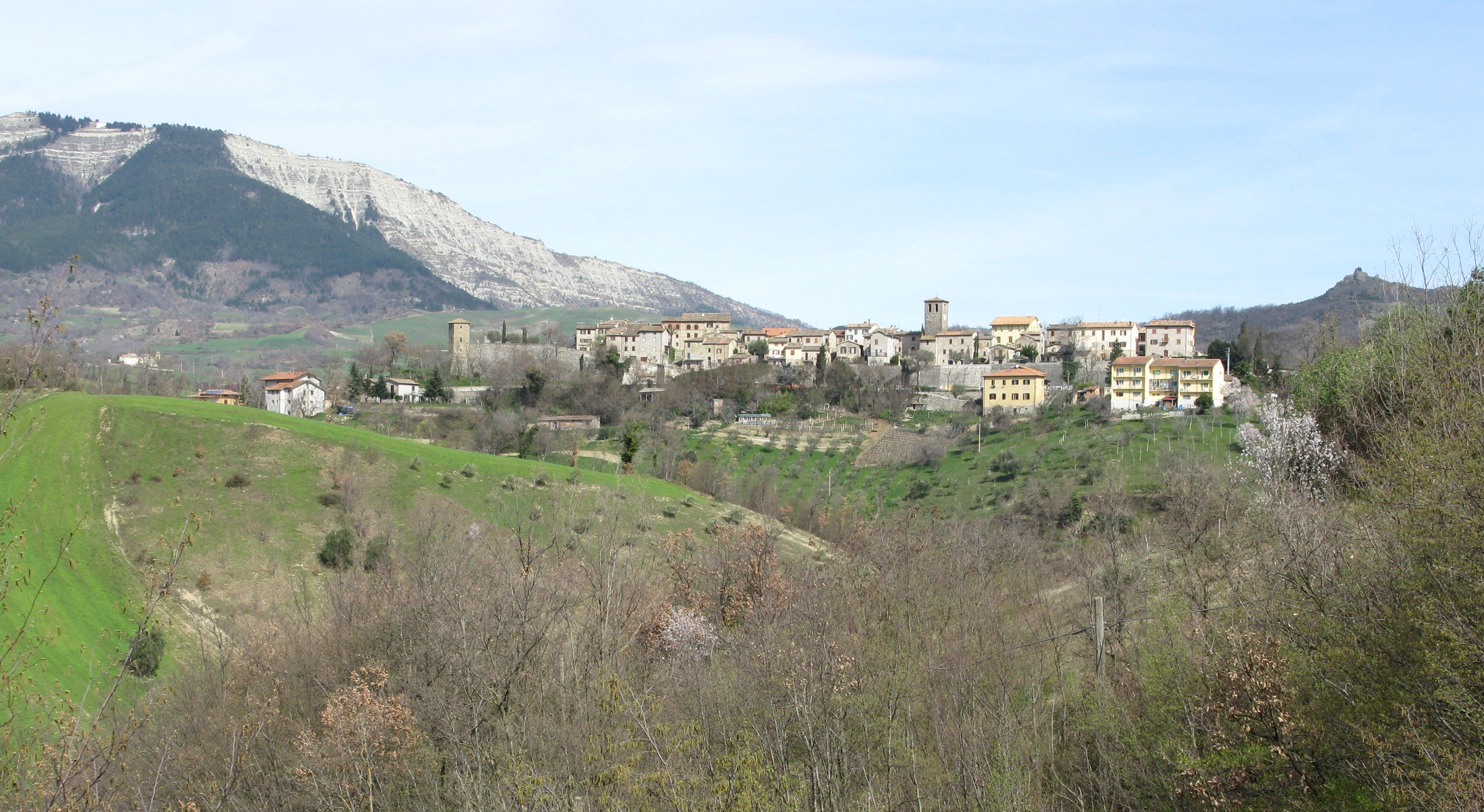
- View of Frontino

- Location within Italy Location within Marche
- Coordinates: 43°45′52.31″N 12°22′40.55″E
- Country: Italy
- Region: Marche
- Province: Pesaro and Urbino (PU)
- Frazioni: Ponte Nuovo

Area
  - Total: 10.74 km^{2} (4.15 sq mi)
- Elevation: 519 m (1,703 ft)

Population (February 2009)
  - Total: 307
  - Density: 28.6/km^{2} (74.0/sq mi)
- Demonym: Frontinesi
- Time zone: UTC+1 (CET)
  - Summer (DST): UTC+2 (CEST)
- Postal code: 61020
- Dialing code: 0722
- ISTAT code: 041017
- Patron saint: San Pietro and San Paolo
- Saint day: 29 June
- Website: Official website

Frontino is a comune (municipality) in the Province of Pesaro e Urbino in the Italian region Marche. As of 2001, it had a population of 369 and an area of 10 square kilometres (3.9 mi^{2}) which amounts to 37 people per square kilometre.

Frontino borders the following municipalities: Carpegna, Piandimeleto, and Pietrarubbia. It is one of I Borghi più belli d'Italia ("The most beautiful villages of Italy").
