= Rimini =

City in Emilia-Romagna, Italy

Rimini Rémin or Rémne (Romagnol)
- Comune
- Comune di Rimini
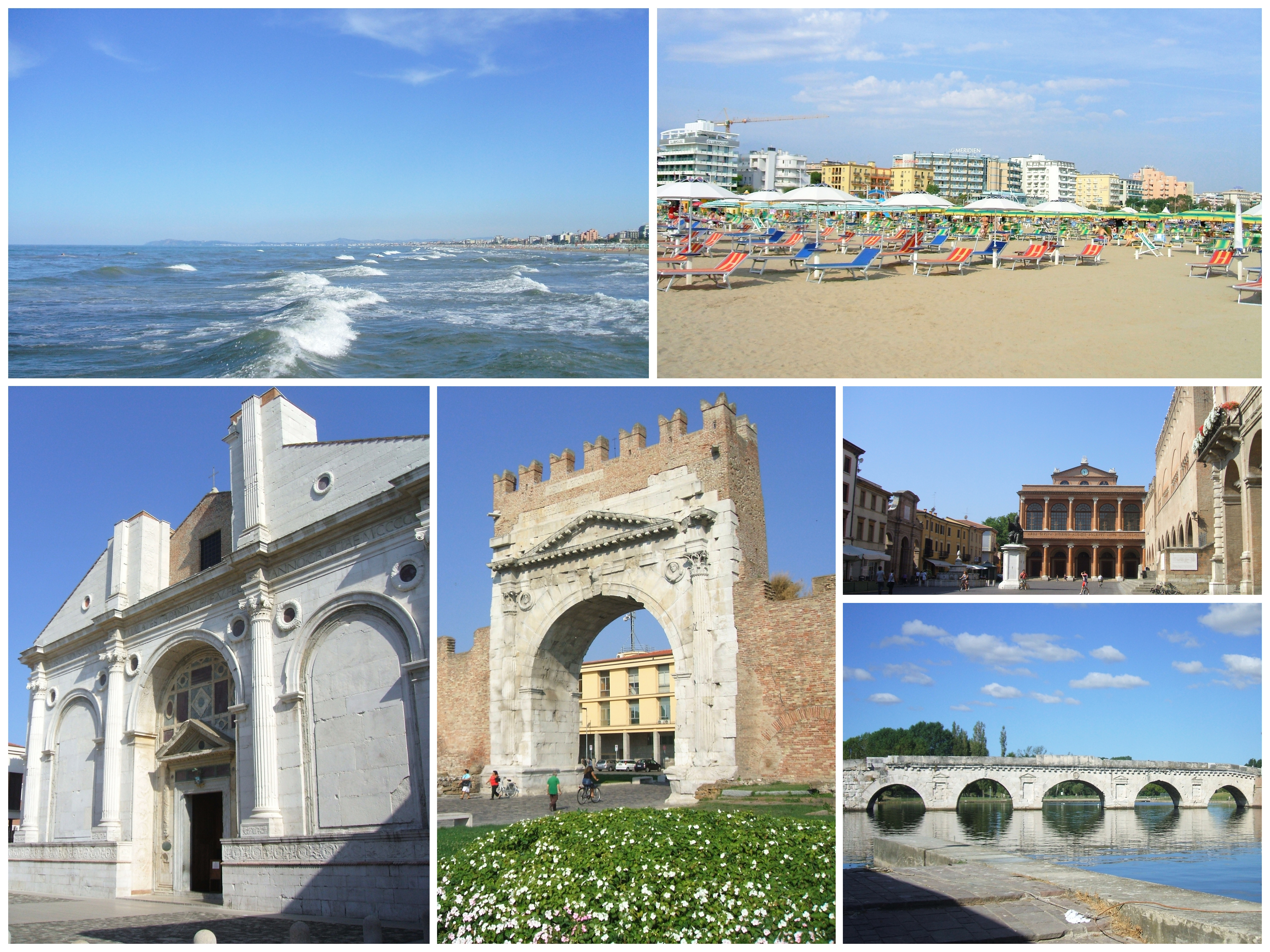
- Clockwise from top left: Adriatic Sea and coast of Rimini; Rimini Beach in the Lungomare area; Rimini theatre and Pope Paul V in Cavour Square; Tiberius Bridge; Arch of Augustus; Malatesta Temple

- Flag Coat of arms

- Location within Italy Location within Emilia-Romagna
- Coordinates: 44°03′34″N 12°34′06″E
- Country: Italy
- Region: Emilia-Romagna
- Province: Rimini
- Frazioni: Several, including Miramare and San Vito

Government
  - Mayor: Jamil Sadegholvaad (PD)

Area
  - Total: 135.71 km^{2} (52.40 sq mi)
- Elevation: 6 m (20 ft)

Population (2026)
  - Total: 150,774
  - Density: 1,111.0/km^{2} (2,877.5/sq mi)
- Demonym: Riminese(i)
- Time zone: UTC+1 (CET)
  - Summer (DST): UTC+2 (CEST)
- Postal code: 47921, 47922, 47923, 47924
- Dialing code: 0541
- Patron saint: Gaudentius of Rimini
- Saint day: 14 October
- Website: Official website

Rimini (/ˈrɪmɪni/ RIM-in-ee; Italian: [ˈriːmini]; Romagnol: Rémin or Rémne; Latin: Ariminum) is a city and municipality (comune) in the region of Emilia-Romagna in northern Italy. As of 2026, with a population of 150,774, it is Italy's 26th-largest city.

Sprawling along the Adriatic Sea, Rimini is situated at a strategically-important north-south passage along the coast at the southern tip of the Po Valley. It is one of the most notable seaside resorts in Europe, with a significant domestic and international tourist economy. The first bathing establishment opened in 1843. The city is also the birthplace of the film director Federico Fellini and the nearest Italian city to the Republic of San Marino.

The ancient Romans founded the colonia of Ariminum in 268 BC, constructing the Arch of Augustus and the Ponte di Tiberio at the start of strategic roads that ended in Rimini. During the Renaissance, the city benefited from the court of the House of Malatesta, hosting artists like Leonardo da Vinci and producing the Tempio Malatestiano. In the 19th century, Rimini hosted many movements for Italian unification. Much of the city was destroyed during World War II, and it earned a gold medal for civic valour for its partisan resistance. In recent years, the Rimini Fiera has become one of Italy's largest sites for trade fairs and conferences.

== History ==
=== Ancient history ===
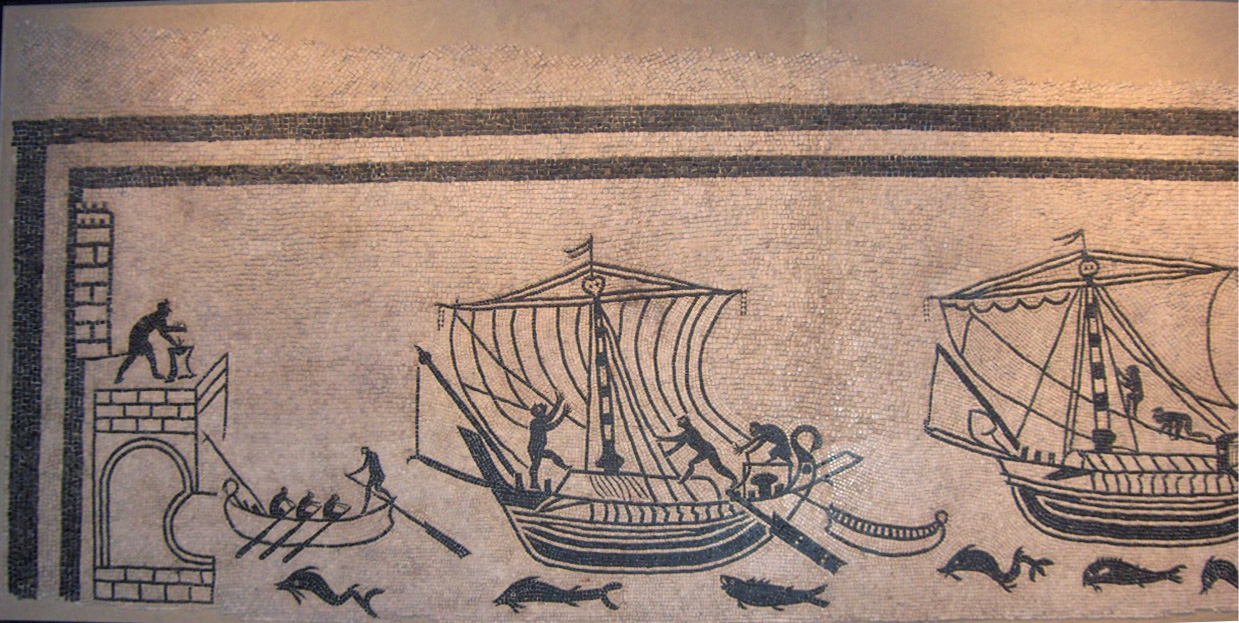
Rimini's ancient harbour, portrayed in the mosaic of the boats from the domus of Palazzo Diotallevi

The area was inhabited by Etruscans until the arrival of the Celts, who held it from the 6th century BC until their defeat by the Umbri in 283 BC. In 268 BC at the mouth of the Ariminus (now called the Marecchia), the Roman Republic founded the colonia of Ariminum.

Ariminum was seen as a bastion against Celtic invaders and also as a springboard for conquering the Padana plain. The city was involved in the civil wars of the first century, aligned with the popular party and its leaders, first Gaius Marius, and then Julius Caesar. After crossing the Rubicon, the latter made his legendary appeal to the legions in the Forum of Rimini.

As the terminus of the Via Flaminia, which ended in the town at the surviving prestigious Arch of Augustus (erected 27 BC), Rimini was a road junction connecting central and northern Italy by the Via Aemilia that led to Piacenza and the Via Popilia that extended northwards; it also opened up trade by sea and river.

Remains of the amphitheatre that could seat 12,000 people, and a five-arched bridge of Istrian stone completed by Tiberius (21 AD), are still visible. Later Galla Placidia built the church of Santo Stefano.

That Rimini is of Roman origins is best illustrated by the city being divided by two main streets, the Cardo and the Decumanus (as remains of a graeco-roman grid plan).

The end of Roman rule was marked by destruction caused by invasions and wars, but also by the establishment of the palaces of the Imperial officers and the first churches, the symbol of the spread of Christianity that held the important Council of Ariminum in the city in 359.

=== Middle Ages ===
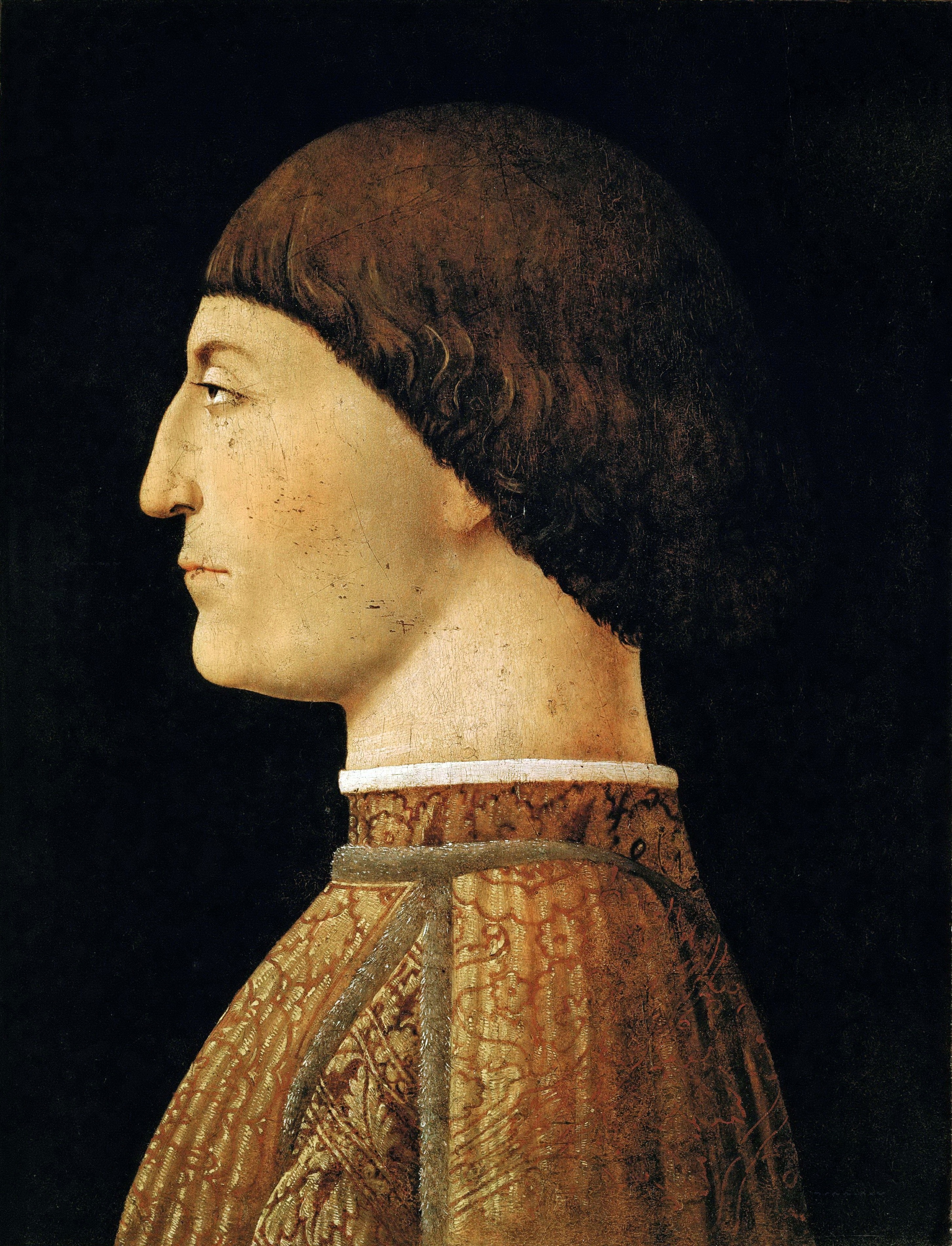
Portrait of Sigismondo Pandolfo Malatesta called the Wolf of Rimini, by Piero della Francesca, c. 1450, Louvre

When the Ostrogoths conquered Rimini in 493, Odoacer, besieged in Ravenna, had to capitulate. During the Gothic War (535–554), Rimini was taken and retaken many times (see Siege of Ariminum). In its vicinity the Byzantine general Narses overthrew (553) the Alamanni. Under the Byzantine rule, it belonged to the Duchy of the Pentapolis, part of the Exarchate of Ravenna.

In 728, it was taken with many other cities by Liutprand, King of the Lombards but returned to the Byzantines about 735. Pepin the Short gave it to the Holy See, but during the wars of the popes and the Italian cities against the emperors, Rimini sided with the latter.

In the 13th century, it suffered from the discords of the Gambacari and Ansidei families. The city became a municipality in the 14th century, and with the arrival of the religious orders, numerous convents and churches were built, providing work for many illustrious artists. In fact, Giotto inspired the 14th-century School of Rimini, which was the expression of original cultural ferment.

The House of Malatesta emerged from the struggles between municipal factions with Malatesta da Verucchio, who in 1239 was named podestà (chief magistrate) of the city. Despite interruptions, his family held authority until 1528. In 1312 he was succeeded by Malatestino Malatesta, first signore (lord) of the city and Pandolfo I Malatesta, the latter's brother, named by Louis IV, Holy Roman Emperor, as imperial vicar of Romagna.

Ferrantino, son of Malatesta II (1335), was opposed by his cousin Ramberto and by Cardinal Bertrand du Pouget (1331), legate of Pope John XXII. Malatesta II was also lord of Pesaro. He was succeeded by Malatesta Ungaro (1373) and Galeotto I Malatesta, uncle of the former (1385), lord also of Fano (from 1340), Pesaro, and Cesena (1378).

His son, Carlo I Malatesta, one of the most respected condottieri of the time, enlarged the Riminese possessions and restored the port. Carlo died childless in 1429, and the lordship was divided into three parts, Rimini going to Galeotto Roberto Malatesta, a Catholic zealot inadequate for the position.

The Pesarese line of the Malatestas tried, in fact, to take advantage of his weakness and to capture the city, but Sigismondo Pandolfo Malatesta, Carlo's nephew, who was only 14 at the time, intervened to save it. Galeotto retired to a convent, and Sigismondo obtained the rule of Rimini.

Sigismondo Pandolfo was the most famous lord of Rimini. In 1433, Sigismund, Holy Roman Emperor, sojourned in the city and for a while he was the commander-in-chief of the Papal armies. A skilled general, Sigismondo often acted as condottiero for other states to gain money to embellish it (he was also a poet). He had the famous Tempio Malatestiano rebuilt by Leon Battista Alberti. However, after the rise of Pope Pius II, he had to fight constantly for the independence of the city.

In 1463, he was forced to submit to Pius II, who left him only Rimini and little more; Roberto Malatesta, his son (1482), under Pope Paul II, nearly lost his state, but under Pope Sixtus IV, became the commanding officer of the pontifical army against Ferdinand of Naples. Sigismondo was, however, defeated by Neapolitan forces in the battle of Campomorto (1482). Pandolfo IV, his son (1500), lost Rimini to Cesare Borgia, after he was ousted from power, the city fell to Venice (1503–1509), but it was later retaken by Pope Julius II and incorporated into the Papal States.

After the death of Pope Leo X, Pandolfo returned for several months, and with his son Sigismondo Malatesta held a rule which looked tyrannous even for the time. Pope Adrian VI expelled him again and gave Rimini to the Duke of Urbino, the pope's vicar in Romagna.

In 1527, Sigismondo managed to regain the city, but in the following year the Malatesta dominion died forever.

=== Renaissance and Enlightenment ===
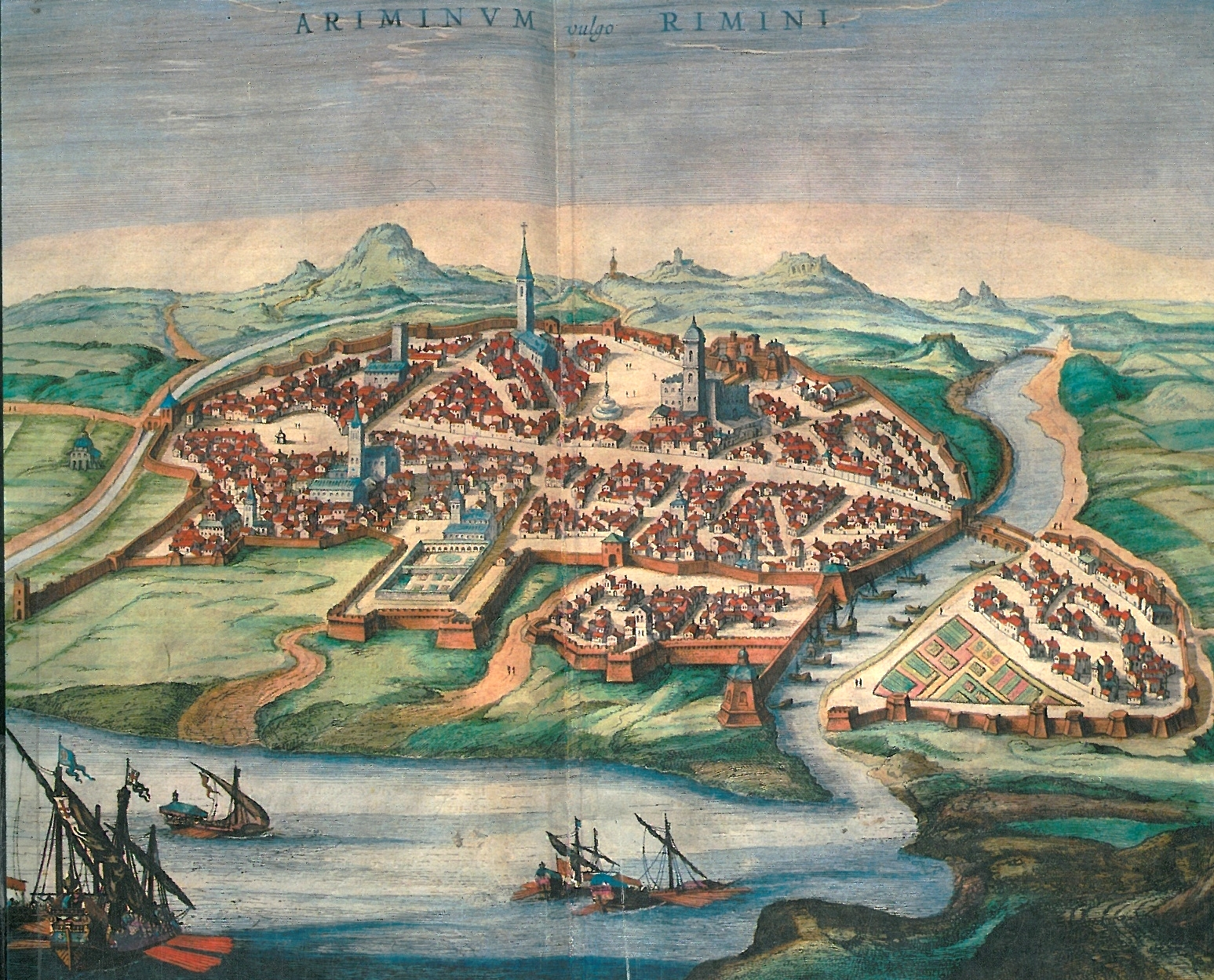
View of Rimini, engraving by Georg Braun (1572)

At the beginning of the 16th century, Rimini, now a secondary town of the Papal States, was ruled by an Apostolic Legate. Towards the end of the 16th century, the municipal square (now Piazza Cavour), which had been closed off on a site where the Poletti Theatre was subsequently built, was redesigned. The statue of Pope Paul V has stood in the centre of the square next to the fountain since 1614.

In the 16th century, the 'grand square', which was where markets and tournaments were held, underwent various changes. A small temple dedicated to Saint Anthony of Padua and a clock tower were built there, giving the square its present shape and size. Rimini is said to be the place where Anthony of Padua performed the "Miracle of the Fishes," preaching to an attentive audience of fish after the people of the city ignored him.

Until the 18th century raiding armies, earthquakes, famines, floods and pirate attacks ravaged the city. In this gloomy situation and due to a weakened local economy, fishing took on great importance, a fact testified by the construction of structures such as the fish market and Rimini Lighthouse.

In 1797, Rimini, along with the rest of Romagna, was affected by the passage of the Napoleonic army and became part of the Cisalpine Republic. Napoleonic policy suppressed the monastic orders, confiscating their property and thus dispersing a substantial heritage, and demolished many churches including the ancient cathedral of Santa Colomba.

=== Modern history ===
The troops of Joachim Murat, King of Naples, marched through Rimini on 30 March 1815. In a last attempt to gain allies before his defeat in the Neapolitan War, Murat published the Rimini Proclamation, one of the earliest calls for Italian unification. In 1845, a band of adventurers commanded by Ribbotti entered the city and proclaimed a constitution which was soon abolished. In 1860, Rimini and Romagna were incorporated into the Kingdom of Italy.

The city was transformed after the 1843 founding of the first bathing establishment and the Kursaal, a building constructed to host sumptuous social events, became the symbol of Rimini's status as a tourist resort. In just a few years, the seafront underwent considerable development work, making Rimini 'the city of small villas'.

During World War I, Rimini and its surrounding infrastructure was one of the primary targets of the Austro-Hungarian Navy. After Italy's declaration of war on 15 May 1915, the Austro-Hungarian fleet left its harbours the same day and started its assault on the Adriatic coast between Venice and Barletta. The 1916 Rimini earthquakes, on 17 May and 16 August, led to the demolition of 615 buildings in the city, with many historic churches severely damaged. 4,174 people were displaced between Rimini and Riccione. On 19 October 1922, Riccione was separated from Rimini to form a separate comune.

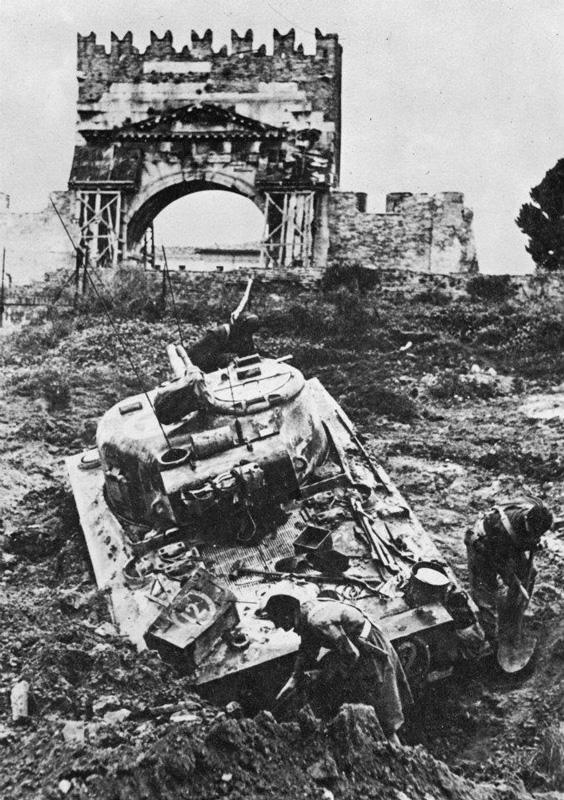
A tank in front of the Arch of Augustus, 1944

In World War II, Rimini suffered sustained Allied aerial bombardment from November 1943 until its liberation on 21 September 1944. 82% of Rimini's buildings were destroyed, the highest figure among Italian cities with over 50,000 inhabitants. Around 55,000 refugees fled to the north, to the hinterland, and to San Marino, where they sheltered in the country's railway tunnels. As the Allied frontline approached the city, naval bombardment followed, and remaining citizens hid in makeshift shelters or in caves by the Covignano hill. Partisan resistance was also notable in Rimini, with official reports of 400 young people involved in resistance cells. On 16 August 1944, three partisans were hanged in Rimini's central square, which would later be renamed in their honour. The Battle of Rimini was a major engagement in the Gothic Line. Oliver Leese, the British Eighth Army's commander, called the advance to liberate Rimini "one of the hardest battles of the Eighth Army ... comparable to El Alamein, Mareth, and the Gustav Line (Monte Cassino)". Within 37 days of the battle, over 10,000 soldiers had died between the Allied and Axis forces. For its role in liberating Rimini, the 3rd Greek Mountain Brigade was awarded the honorific title "Rimini Brigade". 1,939 Allied soldiers, of which 1,413 are British, were buried in the Coriano Ridge War Cemetery in Coriano. 114 Greek soldiers were buried in a cemetery in Riccione's Fontanelle area, and an Indian cemetery with 618 burials is located on the San Marino Highway.

Following Rimini's liberation, reconstruction work began, culminating in huge development of the tourist industry in the city.

In 1956, Bellaria-Igea Marina was separated from Rimini to form a separate comune.

== Geography ==
Rimini is situated at 44°03′00″ north and 12°34′00″ east, along the coast of the Adriatic Sea, at the southeastern edge of Emilia-Romagna, at a short distance from Montefeltro and Marche. Rimini extends for 135.71 square km and borders the municipalities of Bellaria-Igea Marina, San Mauro Pascoli, and Santarcangelo di Romagna towards NW, Verucchio and Serravalle, San Marino towards SW, Coriano towards S, and Riccione towards SE.

Rimini is the main centre of a 50-kilometre (31-mile) coastal conurbation, which extends from Cervia to Gabicce Mare, including the seaside resorts of Cesenatico, Gatteo a Mare, Bellaria-Igea Marina, Riccione, Misano Adriatico and Cattolica. The conurbation is a result of urban sprawl as the tourist economy developed along the riviera romagnola.

=== Natural features ===
Rimini's natural geography provides a strategically-important passage along the Adriatic Sea at the boundary between northern Italy, characterised by the plains of the Po Valley, and central Italy, characterised by more mountainous terrain. For its geographical position and its climatic features, Rimini is situated on the edge between the Mediterranean and the central European microclimates, providing an environment of notable naturalistic value.

==== Beach ====
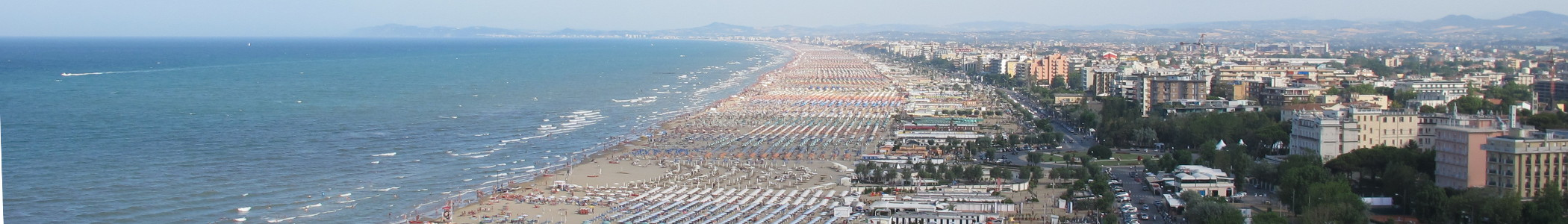
Panoramic view of Rimini Beach

Rimini's coastal strip, made of recent marine deposits, is edged by a fine sandy beach, 15 kilometres (9.3 miles) long and up to 200 metres (660 feet) wide, interrupted only by river mouths and gently shelving towards the sea. Along the coastline, there is a low sandy cliff, created by the rising sea in around 4000 BC, partly conserved north of Rimini, between Rivabella and Bellaria-Igea Marina, approximately 1.3 kilometres (0.81 miles) from the coast.

Rimini's ancient coastline was situated much farther inland: it gradually shifted outward over centuries, with new land developed throughout the 20th century.

==== Rivers and streams ====
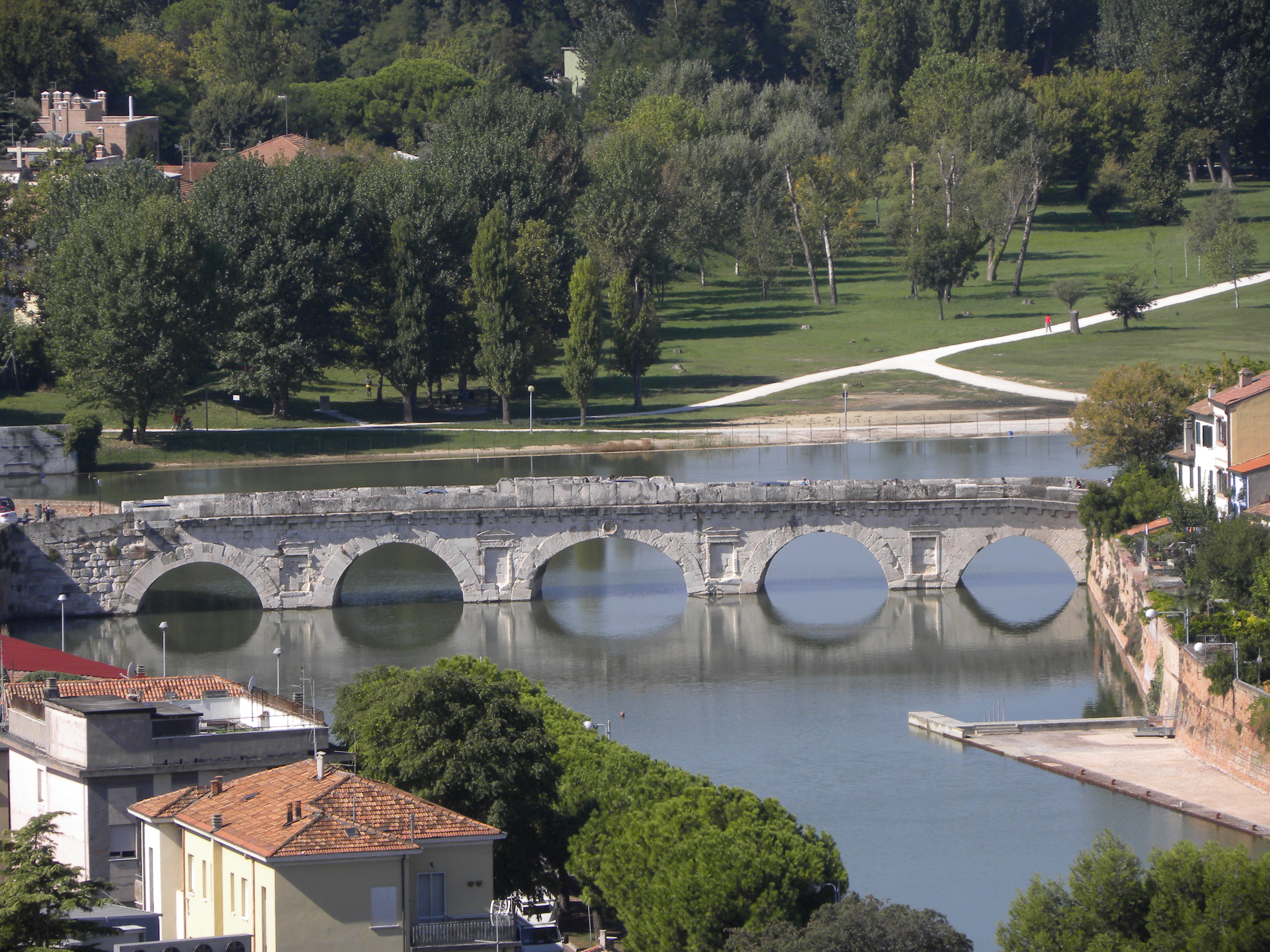
An aerial view of Ponte di Tiberio, at the end of Rimini's canal port, showing the XXV April Park in the background along which the Marecchia used to flow, in September 2015

Rimini's city centre was founded between two rivers: the Marecchia and the Ausa. Until the 1960s, the Ausa flowed south of Rimini's city centre, running between the present-day Rimini Sud junction of the A14 tolled highway and the Arch of Augustus, where it turned north-east along the old city walls to empty at Piazzale Kennedy. From the 1960s, the Ausa was diverted to flow parallel to the SS16 state road along cemented banks, and empty into the Marecchia. The diversion was completed in 1972, with the Ausa's former route reduced to a sewage outlet, and redeveloped into a series of public parks.

The Marecchia itself, which flows north of Rimini, was also deviated to empty into the Adriatic Sea further north, between San Giuliano Mare and Rivabella. The deviation was prompted because the river was subjected to periodic, destructive floods near its mouth, where the riverbed became narrow after various bends. The ancient riverbed is still used as Rimini's harbour.

Rimini's southern boundary with the municipality of Riccione is marked by the Rio dell'Asse, a minor stream.

==== Hills ====
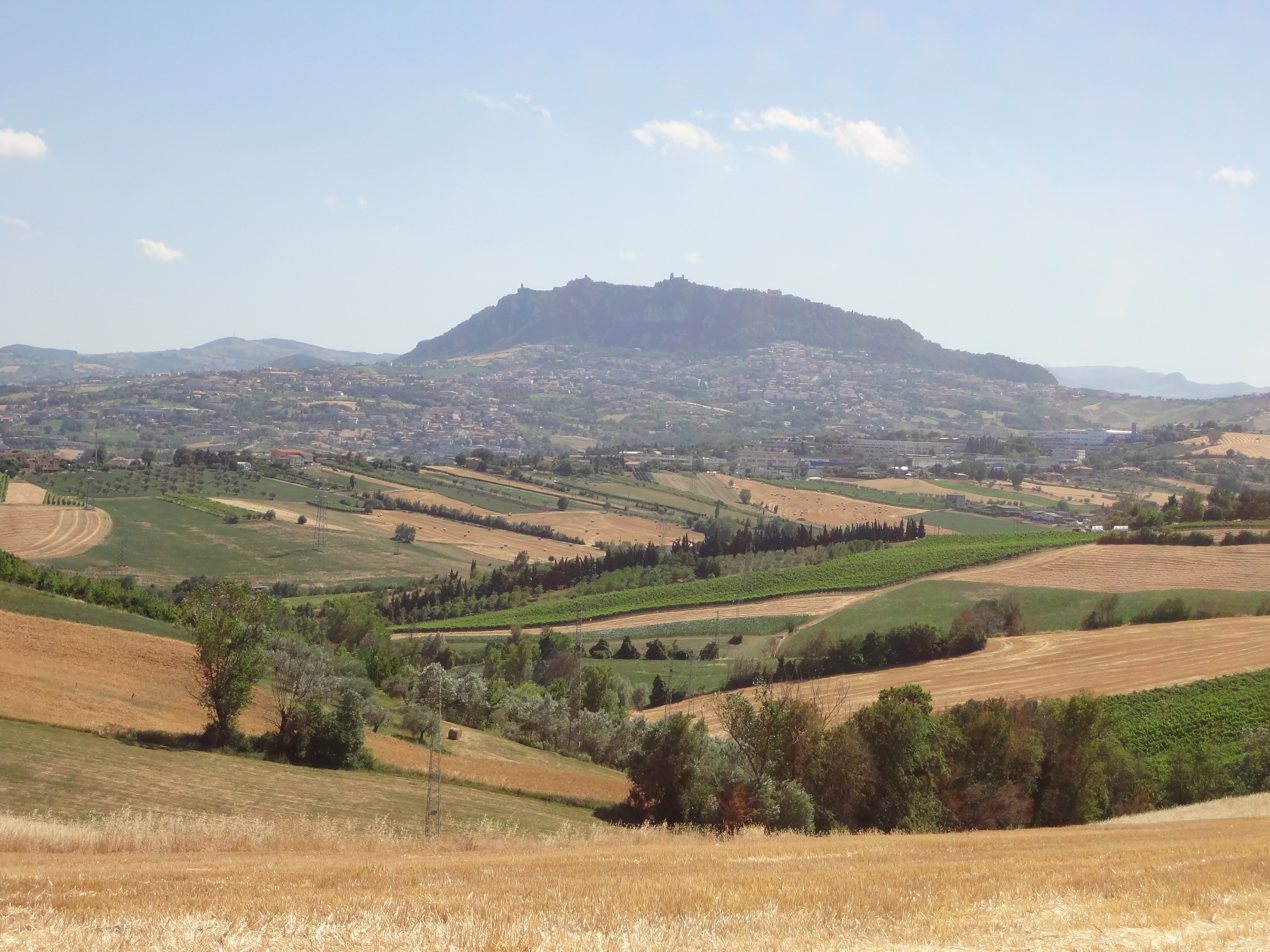
View of Monte Titano, San Marino, from Monte Cieco, on the road between Rimini and Santa Cristina

To its southwest, Rimini is surrounded by several rolling hills: Covignano (153 metres (502 feet) altitude), Vergiano (81 metres (266 feet) altitude), San Martino Monte l'Abbate (57 metres (187 feet) altitude) and San Lorenzo in Correggiano (60 metres (200 feet) altitude). The hills are widely cultivated, with vineyards, olive groves and orchards, and historic villas.

=== Districts ===
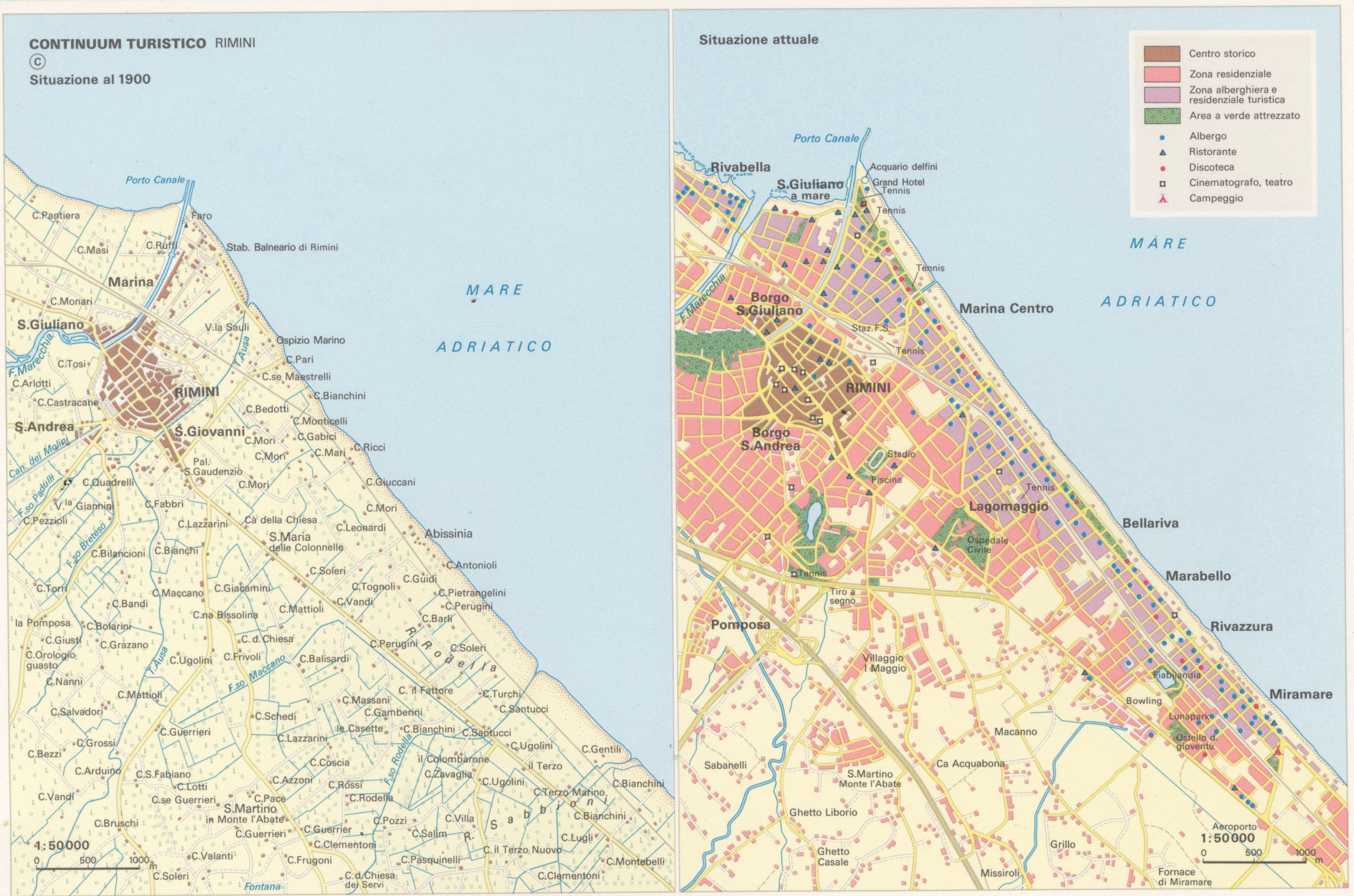
Changes of Rimini tourists zone in the XX century

==== City centre and boroughs ====
Rimini's city centre, bounded by the Malatesta city walls, was divided in the medieval era into four rioni. Clodio, in the city's north, was popular and a peculiar urban structure tied with the Marecchia. Pomposo, in the city's east, was the largest district, and included large orchards and convents. Cittadella, in the city's west, was the most important district, including the municipal palaces, Castel Sismondo, and the Cathedral of Santa Colomba. Montecavallo, in the city's south, is characterised today by bowed, irregular streets of medieval origins, by the Fossa Patara creek and a small hill called Montirone. The boundaries of these rioni are not known, but it is assumed that they followed the current Corso d'Augusto, Via Garibaldi, and Via Gambalunga.

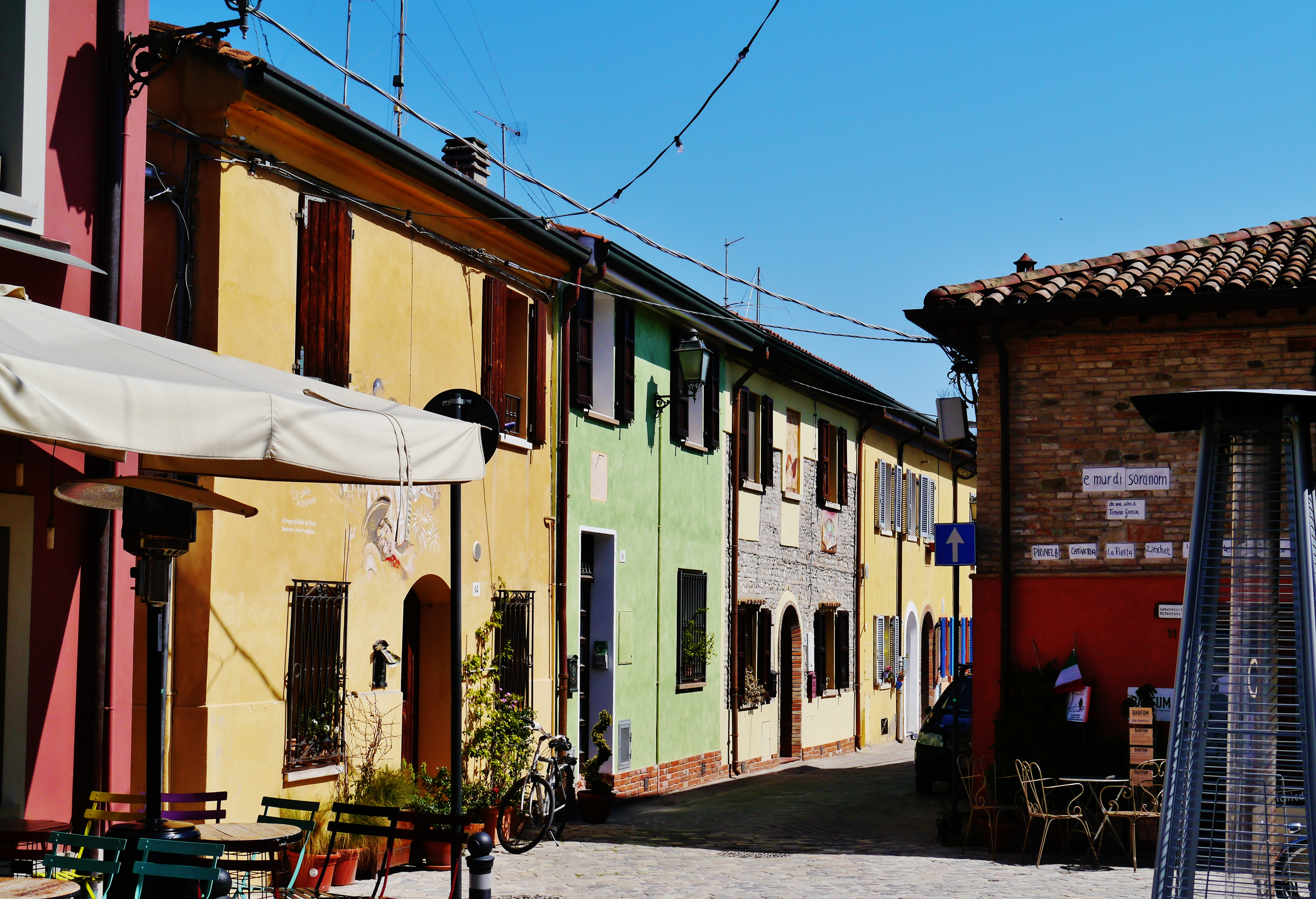
A street in Borgo San Giuliano, April 2022

Outside Rimini's city centre were four ancient boroughs: San Giuliano, San Giovanni, San Andrea, and Marina. These were entirely incorporated to the city by the urban sprawl in the early 20th century:

- Borgo San Giuliano, along Via Emilia, dates to the 11th century and was originally a fishermen's settlement. Dominated by the Church of San Giuliano, it is one of the most picturesque spots of the city, with narrow streets and squares, colourful small houses and many frescoes representing characters and places of Federico Fellini's films.
- Borgo San Giovanni, on both sides of Via Flaminia, was populated by artisans and the middle class.
- Borgo Sant'Andrea, located outside of Porta Montanara on the city's southwestern gate, was tied with agriculture and commerce of cows.
- Borgo Marina, on the right bank of the Marecchia, was heavily transformed by Fascist demolitions and World War II bombings, which hit this area due to its proximity to the bridges and railway station of the city.

San Giovanni and Sant'Andrea were developed in the 15th century; they burned in a fire in 1469 and were rebuilt in the 19th century, relocating small industries and manufactures, including a brick factory and a phosphorus matches factory.

==== Municipality ====
Rimini's municipality includes the coastal districts of Torre Pedrera, Viserbella, Viserba, Rivabella, and San Giuliano Mare to the city centre's north. To the city centre's south are the coastal districts of Bellariva, Marebello, Rivazzurra, and Miramare. These coastal districts are characterised by their tourist economy, with hotels and entertainment venues.

Along the Via Emilia, to Rimini's northwest, is the suburb of Celle and Santa Giustina, just before the border with Santarcangelo di Romagna. North of Santa Giustina are the villages of Orsoleto and San Vito. Along the Via Marecchiese, to Rimini's east, are the suburbs of Marecchiese, Villaggio Azzurro, Padulli, and Spadarolo, and the rural village of Corpolò. On the road to San Marino is the village of Grotta Rossa. On the road to Ospedaletto is the suburb of Villaggio 1° Maggio and the rural village of Gaiofana. Along the Via Flaminia, to Rimini's southeast, are the suburbs of Colonnella and Lagomaggio.

=== Climate ===
Rimini has a humid subtropical climate (Köppen: Cfa) moderated by the influence of the Adriatic Sea, featuring autumn and winter mean temperatures and annual low temperatures among the very highest in Emilia-Romagna.

Precipitations are equally distributed during the year, with a peak in October and minimums in January and July. In spring, autumn, and winter, precipitations mainly come from oceanic fronts, while in summer, they are brought by thunderstorms, coming from the Apennines or the Po Valley.

Humidity is high all year round, averaging a minimum of approximately 72% in June and July and a maximum of approximately 84% in November and December. Prevailing winds blow from west, south, east, and northwest. Southwesterly winds, known as libeccio or garbino, are foehn winds, which may bring warm temperatures in each season. On average, there are over 2,040 sunshine hours per year.

Climate data for Rimini-Miramare, elevation: 12 m or 39 ft, 1991–2020 normals, extremes 1946–present
Month	Jan	Feb	Mar	Apr	May	Jun	Jul	Aug	Sep	Oct	Nov	Dec	Year
Record high °C (°F)	20.4 (68.7)	22.3 (72.1)	26.6 (79.9)	30.0 (86.0)	33.4 (92.1)	37.3 (99.1)	37.6 (99.7)	39.5 (103.1)	35.2 (95.4)	30.4 (86.7)	26.0 (78.8)	22.7 (72.9)	39.5 (103.1)
Mean daily maximum °C (°F)	8.4 (47.1)	10.0 (50.0)	13.6 (56.5)	17.3 (63.1)	22.3 (72.1)	26.7 (80.1)	29.1 (84.4)	29.1 (84.4)	24.7 (76.5)	19.7 (67.5)	14.0 (57.2)	9.3 (48.7)	18.7 (65.7)
Daily mean °C (°F)	4.5 (40.1)	5.6 (42.1)	9.2 (48.6)	12.8 (55.0)	17.6 (63.7)	22.2 (72.0)	24.7 (76.5)	24.5 (76.1)	20.0 (68.0)	15.5 (59.9)	10.4 (50.7)	5.5 (41.9)	14.4 (57.9)
Mean daily minimum °C (°F)	0.9 (33.6)	1.2 (34.2)	4.3 (39.7)	7.7 (45.9)	12.2 (54.0)	16.5 (61.7)	19.0 (66.2)	19.1 (66.4)	15.1 (59.2)	11.2 (52.2)	6.7 (44.1)	1.9 (35.4)	9.6 (49.3)
Record low °C (°F)	−17.2 (1.0)	−14.2 (6.4)	−7.7 (18.1)	−2.2 (28.0)	1.2 (34.2)	5.8 (42.4)	9.4 (48.9)	9.6 (49.3)	5.8 (42.4)	1.2 (34.2)	−5.0 (23.0)	−12.8 (9.0)	−17.2 (1.0)
Average precipitation mm (inches)	41.0 (1.61)	46.0 (1.81)	49.5 (1.95)	54.3 (2.14)	50.9 (2.00)	54.8 (2.16)	49.9 (1.96)	48.1 (1.89)	73.8 (2.91)	78.0 (3.07)	67.8 (2.67)	52.9 (2.08)	667.0 (26.26)
Average precipitation days (≥ 1.0 mm)	5.4	5.7	6.6	7.1	6.5	4.8	4.1	4.3	7.2	7.8	7.6	6.9	73.9
Average relative humidity (%)	82.8	78.6	77.1	77.3	75.7	73.5	72.7	74.5	77.4	81.8	84.0	83.4	78.2
Average dew point °C (°F)	2.2 (36.0)	2.4 (36.3)	5.5 (41.9)	9.1 (48.4)	13.5 (56.3)	17.2 (63.0)	19.3 (66.7)	19.8 (67.6)	16.2 (61.2)	12.8 (55.0)	8.2 (46.8)	3.3 (37.9)	10.8 (51.4)
Mean monthly sunshine hours	65.1	92.4	148.8	162.0	220.1	258.0	297.6	257.3	204.0	164.3	96.0	74.4	2,040
Source 1: NOAA
Source 2: Temperature estreme in Toscana

== Demographics ==
Historical population
Year	Pop.	±%
1861	27,996	—
1871	29,732	+6.2%
1881	32,096	+8.0%
1901	36,487	+13.7%
1911	41,948	+15.0%
1921	47,026	+12.1%
1931	57,030	+21.3%
1936	58,622	+2.8%
1951	69,873	+19.2%
1961	92,912	+33.0%
1971	118,419	+27.5%
1981	127,813	+7.9%
1991	127,960	+0.1%
2001	128,656	+0.5%
2011	139,601	+8.5%
2021	149,169	+6.9%
Source: ISTAT

As of 2026, the population is 150,774, of which 48.3% are males, and 51.7% are females. Minors make up 14.1% of the population, and seniors make up 25.5%.

With the increasing tourism development, population rapidly grew between 1951 and 1981, the fastest growing period for Rimini in the 20th century, when the city's population grew from 77,000 to over 128,000.

=== Immigration ===
As of 2025, immigrants make up 17.2% of the population. The 5 largest foreign countries of birth are Albania, Ukraine, Romania, Moldova, and Senegal.

Foreign-born population (2025)
Country of birth	Population
Albania	4,226
Ukraine	3,082
Romania	2,185
Moldova	1,461
Senegal	1,079
Morocco	925
China	919
Russia	915
Bangladesh	781
Peru	592
San Marino	591
Tunisia	587
North Macedonia	568
Switzerland	521
Argentina	481

=== Religion ===
Rimini's population is mostly Roman Catholic. The city is the seat of the Diocese of Rimini, a suffragan of the Archdiocese of Ravenna-Cervia.

The first cathedral of the diocese was the former Cathedral of Santa Colomba until 1798, when the title was transferred to the church of Sant'Agostino. Since 1809, Rimini's cathedral is the Tempio Malatestiano.

Besides Roman Catholic churches, there are also Orthodox, Evangelical and Adventist churches. Between the 13th and 14th centuries, Rimini had a flourishing Jewish community, which built three distinct synagogues, all destroyed, formerly located around the area of Piazza Cavour, Via Cairoli and Santa Colomba.

== Government ==
In its post-war history, Rimini has largely voted for left-wing parties. In the 1975 regional elections, the Italian Communist Party won 49.9% of votes in Rimini, its best-ever electoral result.

For much of Rimini's modern history, the city's municipal government has been politically subordinate to other cities in Romagna. From 1540 until 1797, with a brief restoration in 1815, Rimini was part of the Papal States' Legation of Romagna, headquartered in Ravenna. In 1797, the Cisalpine Republic incorporated Rimini into the Rubicon Department, headquartered in Forlì. With the return of the Papal States in 1816, Rimini came under the Legation of Forlì. In 1850, Rimini came under the reformed Legation of Romagna, now with Bologna as its capital. Finally, on 27 December 1859, with Romagna's annexation into the Kingdom of Italy, Rimini became part of the Province of Forlì.

On 16 April 1992, for the first time in its modern history, Rimini became a provincial capital with the formation of the Province of Rimini.

== Sights ==
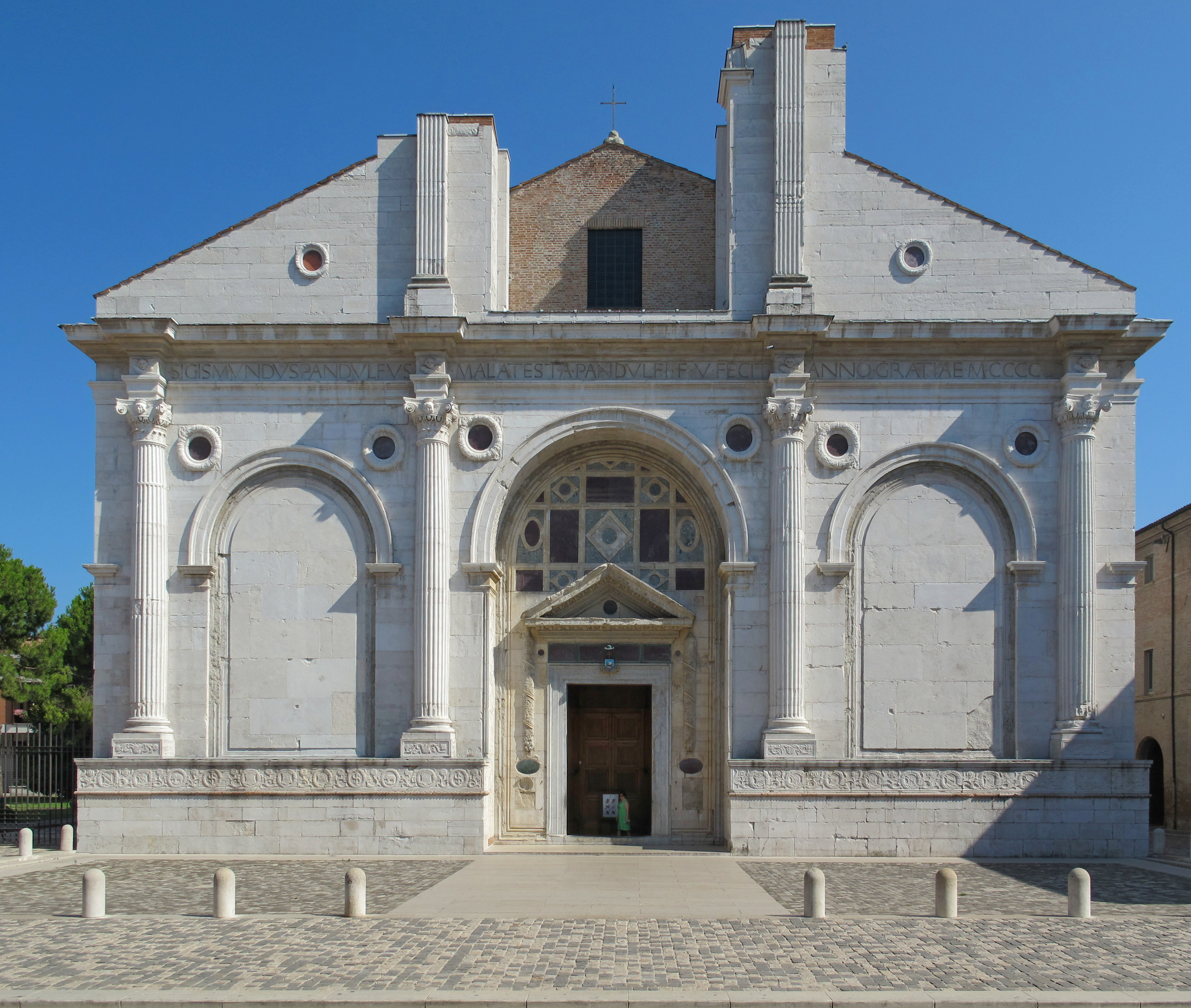
Tempio Malatestiano

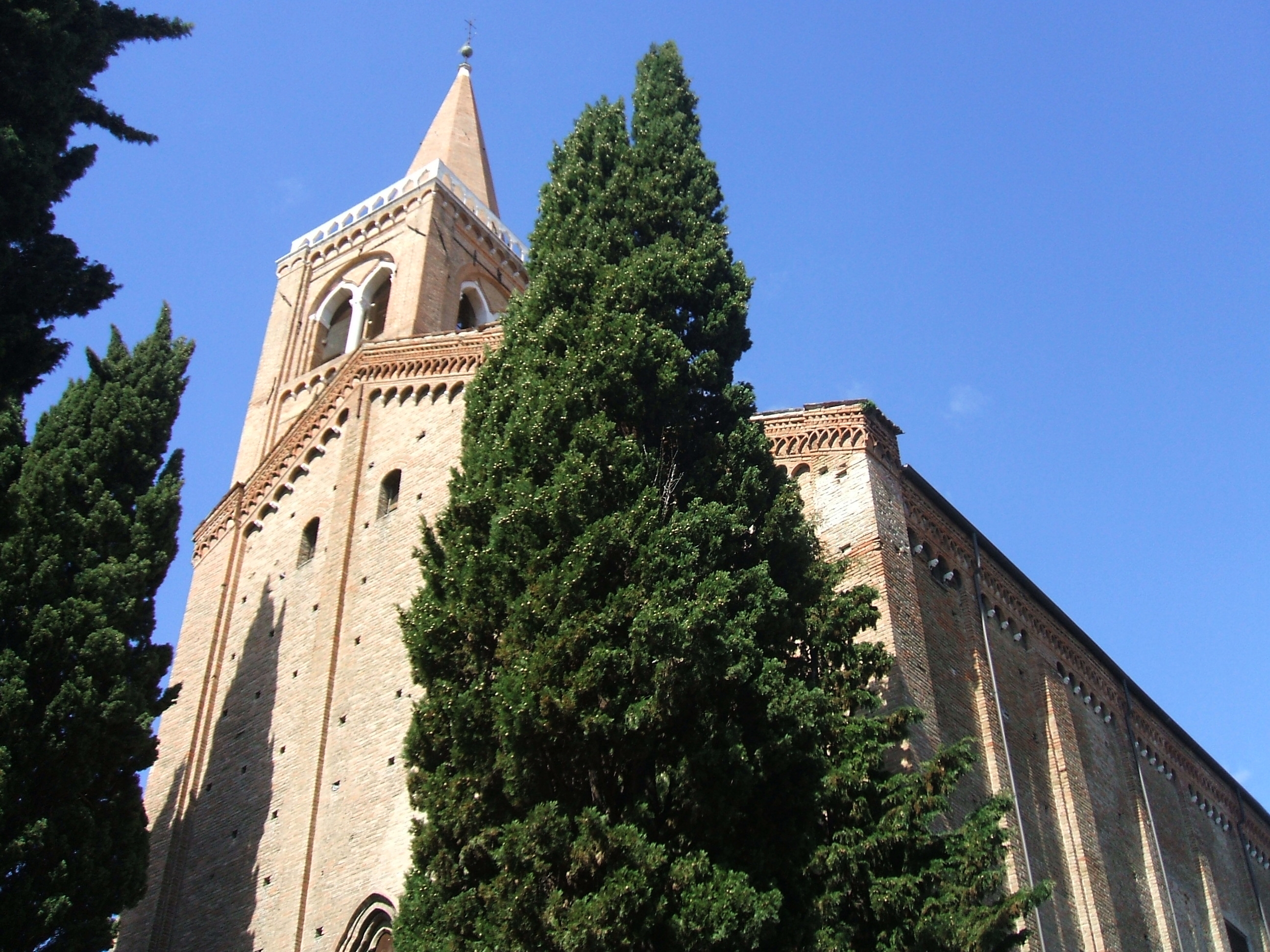
Church of Sant'Agostino

=== Architecture ===
Rimini has a varied historical and artistic heritage which includes churches and monasteries, villas and palaces, fortifications, archaeological sites, streets and squares, as a result of the succession of various civilizations, dominations and historical events through its history, from the Romans to the Byzantines, the medieval comune, the Malatesta seignory, the Venetian Republic and the Papal States dominations.

The city has always been a key gate to the Orient and the southern areas of the Mediterranean for the Po Valley, thanks to its geographical position and its harbour, and a meeting point between cultures of Northern and Central Italy.

Rimini has monuments of different eras, with important examples of architecture from the Roman age, such as the Arch of Augustus, the Tiberius Bridge, the Amphitheatre and the Domus del Chirurgo; from the Middle Ages, such as the Palazzo dell'Arengo, the church of Sant'Agostino and Castel Sismondo; from the Renaissance, with the Tempio Malatestiano, masterpiece of Leon Battista Alberti.

Rimini's archaeological heritage includes some domus of Republican and Imperial age, characterized by polychrome or black and white mosaics, necropolis and sections of the pavement of the ancient Roman streets. The city, along with its boroughs and the seaside district of Marina Centro, also preserves buildings from the Baroque, the Neoclassical and Art Nouveau periods, with churches, palaces, hotels and mansions which reveal its role of cultural and trading centre and seaside resort.

The city centre has a Roman structure, partly modified by following medieval transformations. Urban evolution, through the renovation of the Malatesta, earthquakes and the suppressions of monasteries, has led to a stratification of historic sites and buildings. The bombings of World War II caused extensive destruction and damage, compromising the monumental heritage and the integrity of the city centre, which has been reconstructed and restored in order to valorize its historic places and buildings.

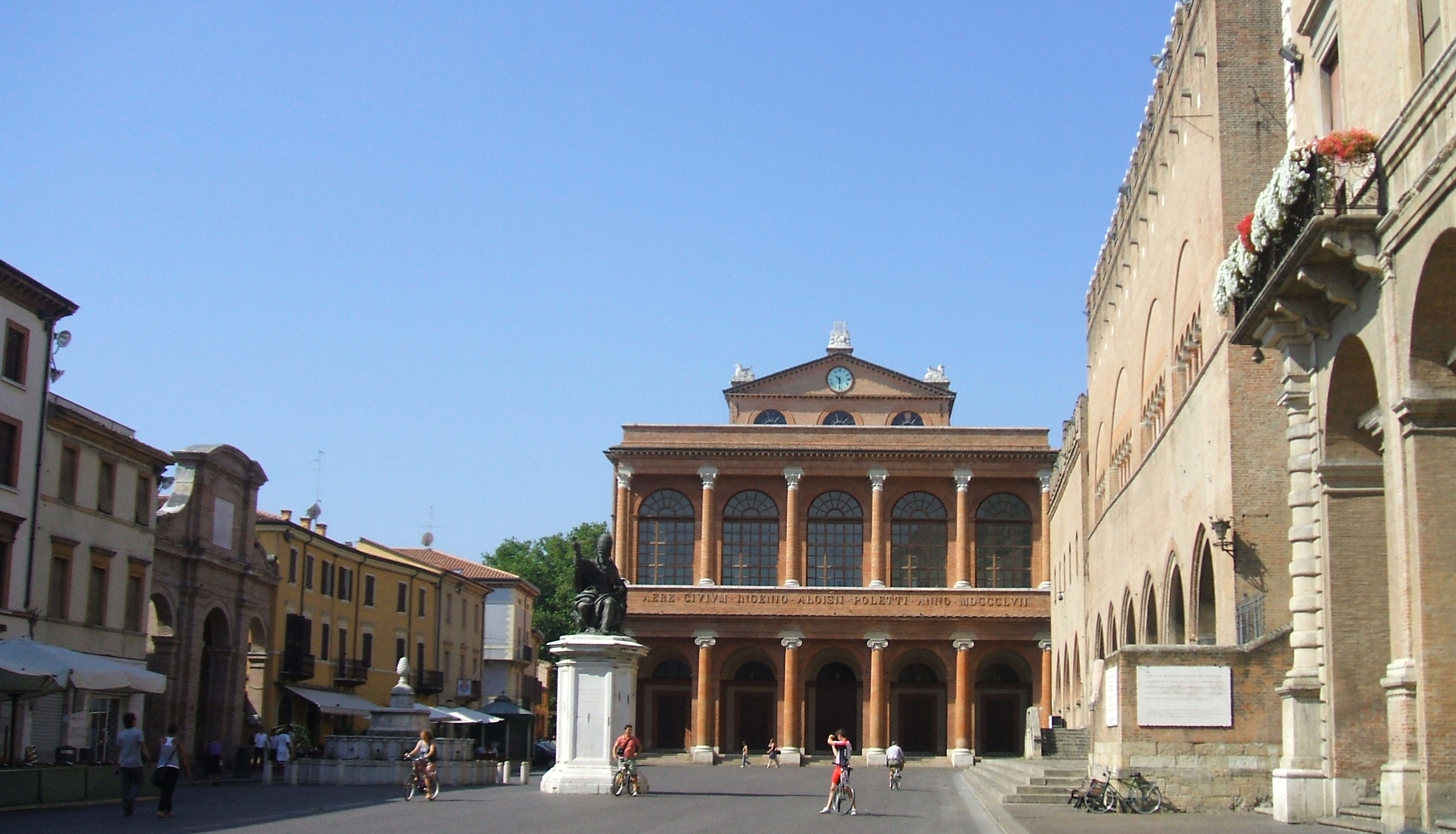
Piazza Cavour

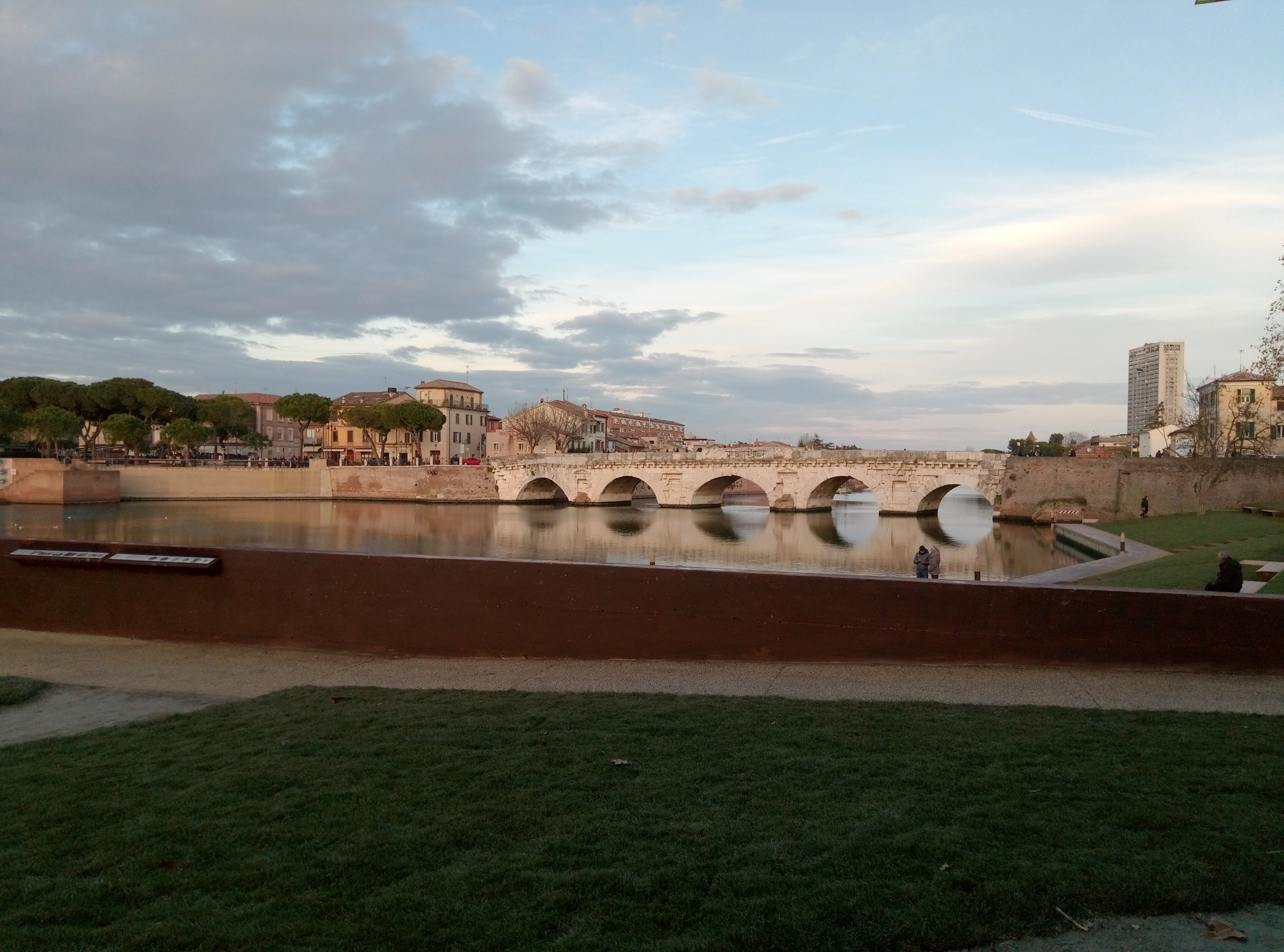
The Tiberius Bridge

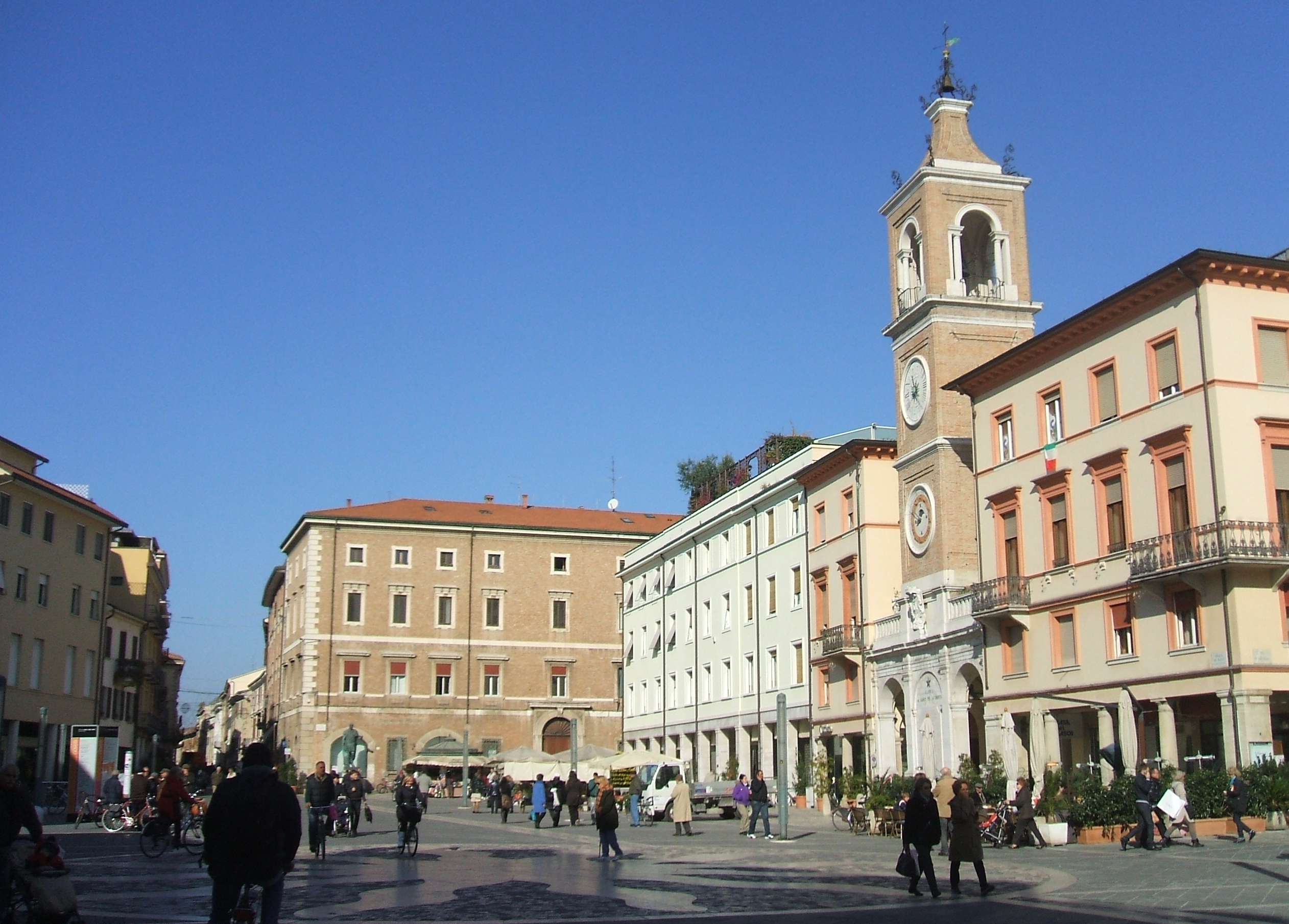
Piazza Tre Martiri

=== Religious buildings ===
- Tempio Malatestiano: the original gothic-style cathedral of San Francesco was built in the 13th century, but reconstructed into a Renaissance masterwork by the Florentine architect Leon Battista Alberti, commissioned by Sigismondo Pandolfo Malatesta, hence the name. In the cathedral are the tombs of Sigismondo and his wife Isotta.
  - Bell tower of the former Cathedral of Santa Colomba.
- Sant'Agostino: 13th-century Romanesque church.
- Chiesa dei Teatini: 17th-century Baroque-style church.
- San Fortunato: this 1418 church houses the Adoration of the Magi painting (1547) by Giorgio Vasari.
- San Giovanni Battista: 12th-century church with single nave with rich stucco decoration from the 18th century.
- San Giuliano Martire: 1553–1575 church houses a painting by Paul Veronese (1588) depicting the martyrdom of that saint. The church also houses the polyptych (1409) by Bittino da Faenza (1357–1427) depicting episodes of this saint's life.
- Santa Maria dei Servi: Church built in 1317 by the religious order of the Servants of Mary and entirely transformed in 1779 by architect Gaetano Stegani, who was buried here. The façade was completed in 1894 by Giuseppe Urbani. The interior has a single nave, adorned with coupled columns on each side and rich Baroque plasters.
- Church of Suffragio: situated in Piazza Ferrari, was constructed by the Jesuites in 1721, designed by Giovan Francesco Buonamici. It features an unfinished brick façade. The interior, shaped in the form of the Latin Cross, has a single nave flanked by chapels and adorned by plain Baroque decorations and paintings by Guido Cagnacci.
- Tempietto of Sant'Antonio.
- Madonna della Scala.

==== Secular buildings ====
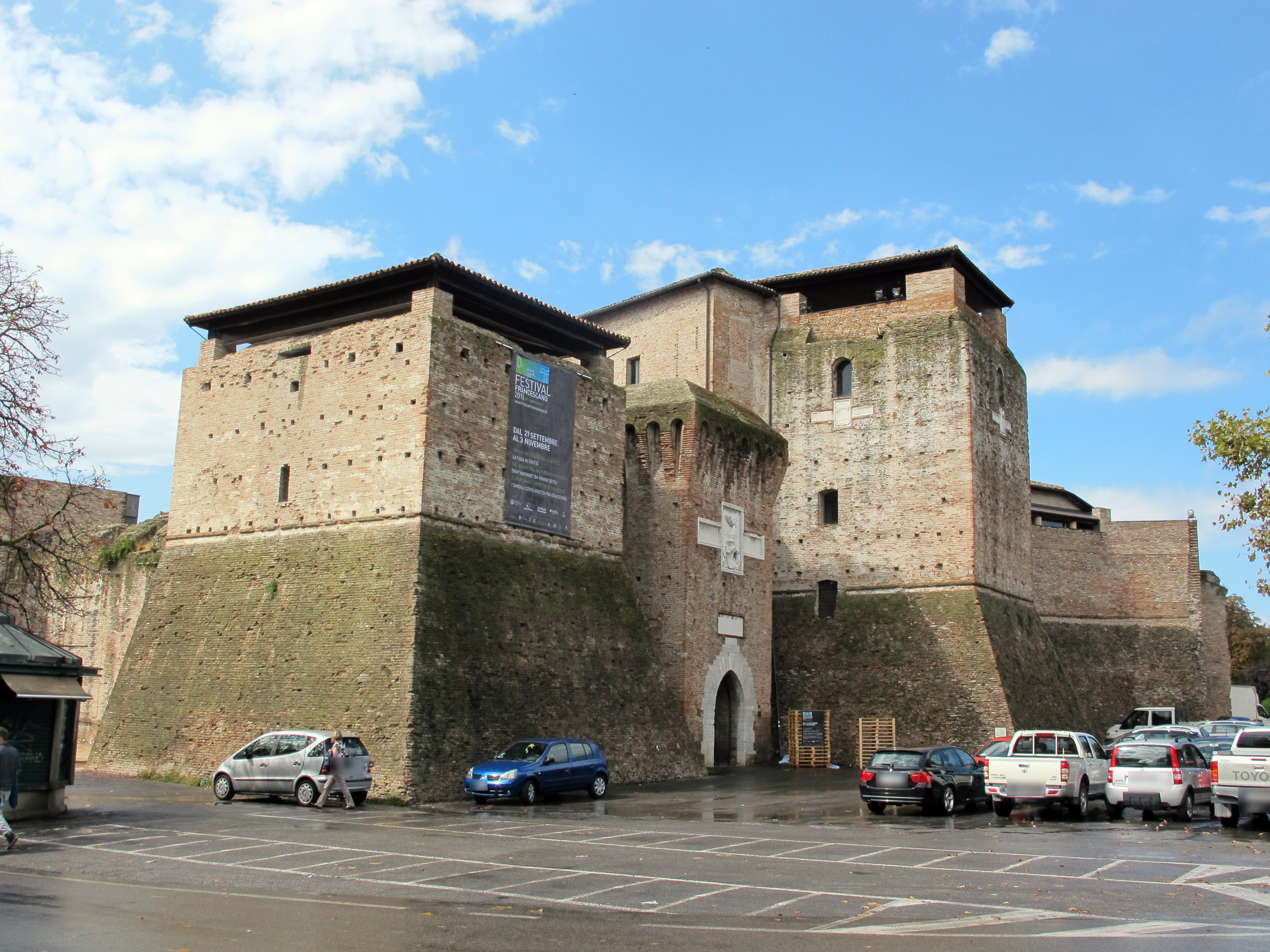
- Castel Sismondo
  Castel Sismondo. This castle built by Sigismondo Pandolfo was later used as a prison.
- Grand Hotel Rimini. Built in Liberty style, the Italian variant of Art Nouveau, the hotel was designed by architect Paolito Somazzi and inaugurated on 1 July 1908. One of Rimini's most well-known buildings, the luxury hotel is notable for its elegance, classic style, and association with Fellini. A copy of the hotel was heavily featured in his film Amarcord (1973), and once successful, Fellini would often stay at the hotel's suite 315. The hotel numbers 121 rooms. Its facilities include a bar, restaurant, spa, indoor swimming pool, sauna, and steam room. It is the only hotel in Rimini with a private beach.
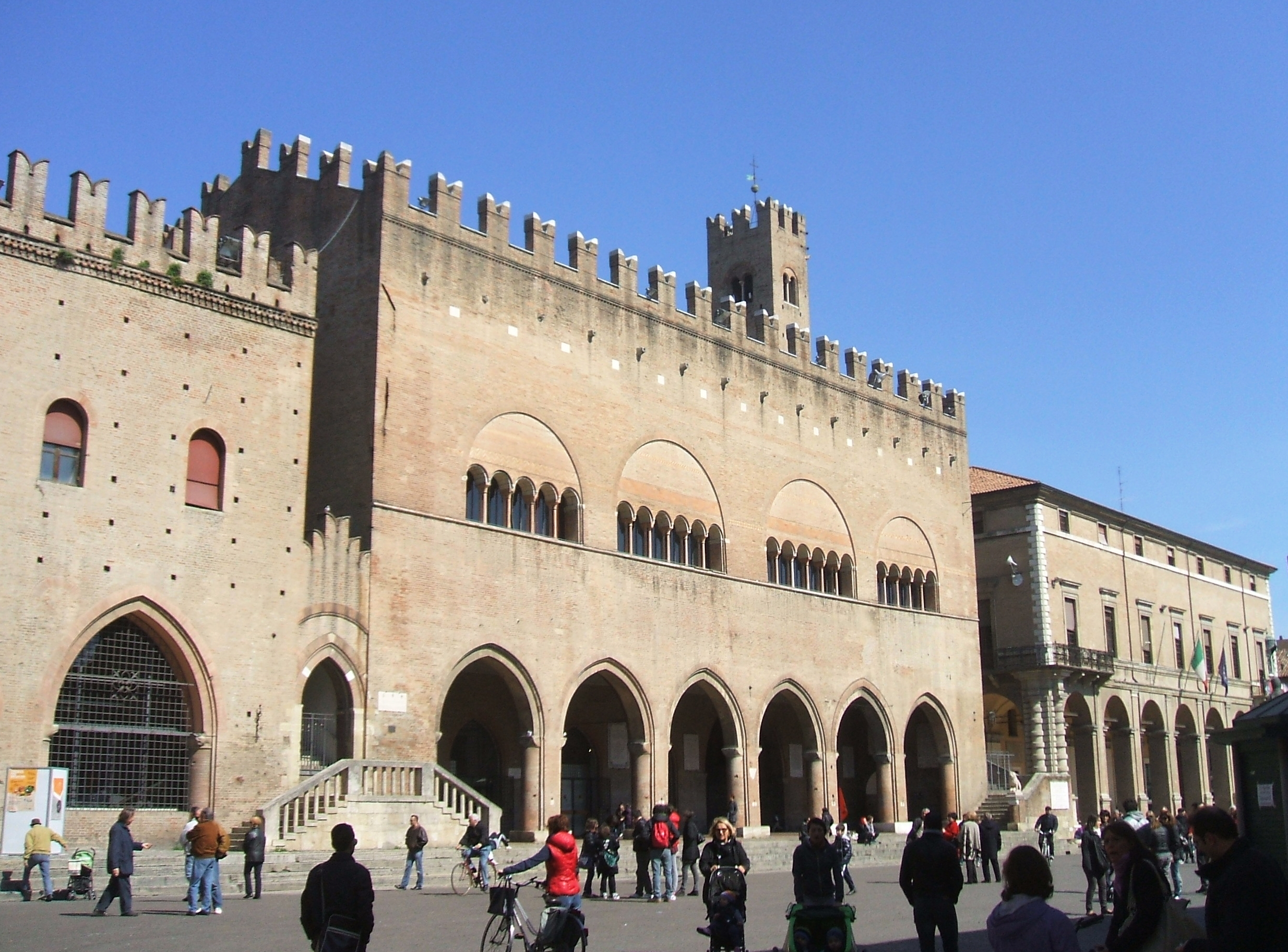
- Palazzo dell'Arengo
  Palazzo dell'Arengo (1204). This building was the seat of the judiciary and civil administrations. On the short side, in the 14th century, the podestà residence was added. It was modified at the end of the 16th century.
- Palazzo Garampi
- Amintore Galli Theatre. Inaugurated on 16 August 1857 with the world premiere of Giuseppe Verdi's Aroldo, the theatre was designed by Luigi Poletti, and is considered one of his architectural masterpieces. The theatre was renovated after being damaged by an earthquake in 1916, and flourished in Fascist Italy following its reopening in 1923. During the Second World War, the theatre was severely damaged by Allied bombardment. Following a complete restoration in the 2010s, the theatre reopened on 28 October 2018.
- Villa des Vergers (in San Lorenzo in Correggiano). Dating to the 17th century, the villa was purchased by Adolphe Noël des Vergers in 1843, and substantially redesigned in 1879 by Arthur-Stanislas Diet. Between 1938 and 1946, it was owned by Mario Ruspoli, 2nd Prince of Poggio Suasa, who employed Pietro Porcinai to design the villa's gardens. The villa was used as a military headquarters by German forces in the Second World War, and has since been owned by a series of local entrepreneurs. Since 2021, the villa has hosted civil wedding ceremonies. It is also used for corporate events.

==== Monuments ====
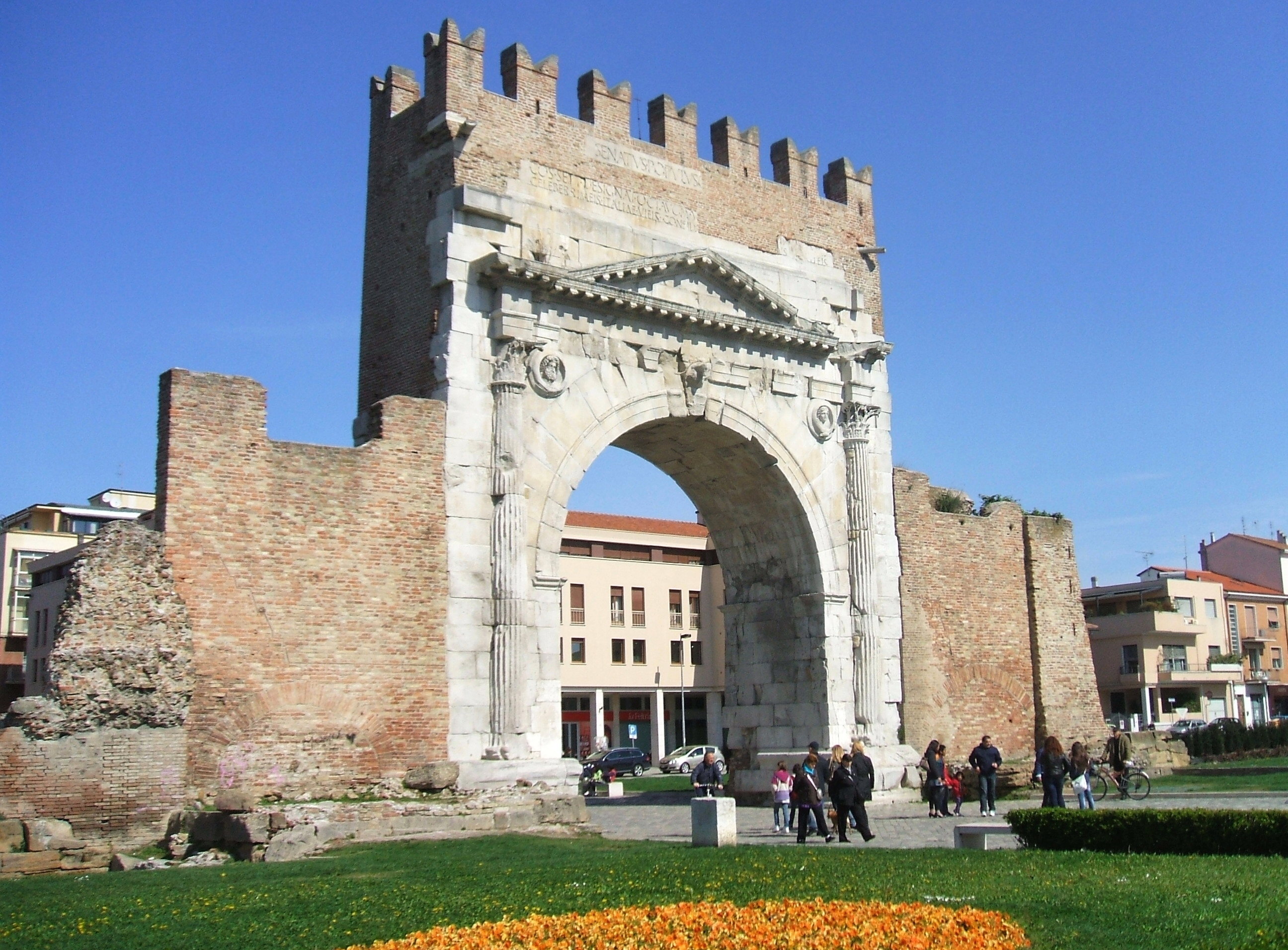
- Arch of Augustus, April 2012
  Arch of Augustus. Built in 27 BC in honour of Augustus, the first Roman emperor, the arch and city gate marks the northern end of the Via Flaminia. Under Fascist Italy, the adjoining city walls and surrounding buildings were demolished, leaving the Arch of Augustus to stand as an isolated monument. Along with the Bridge of Tiberius, it is one of Rimini's most-recognised symbols, and is represented on the city's coat of arms. It is the oldest preserved arch in Italy.
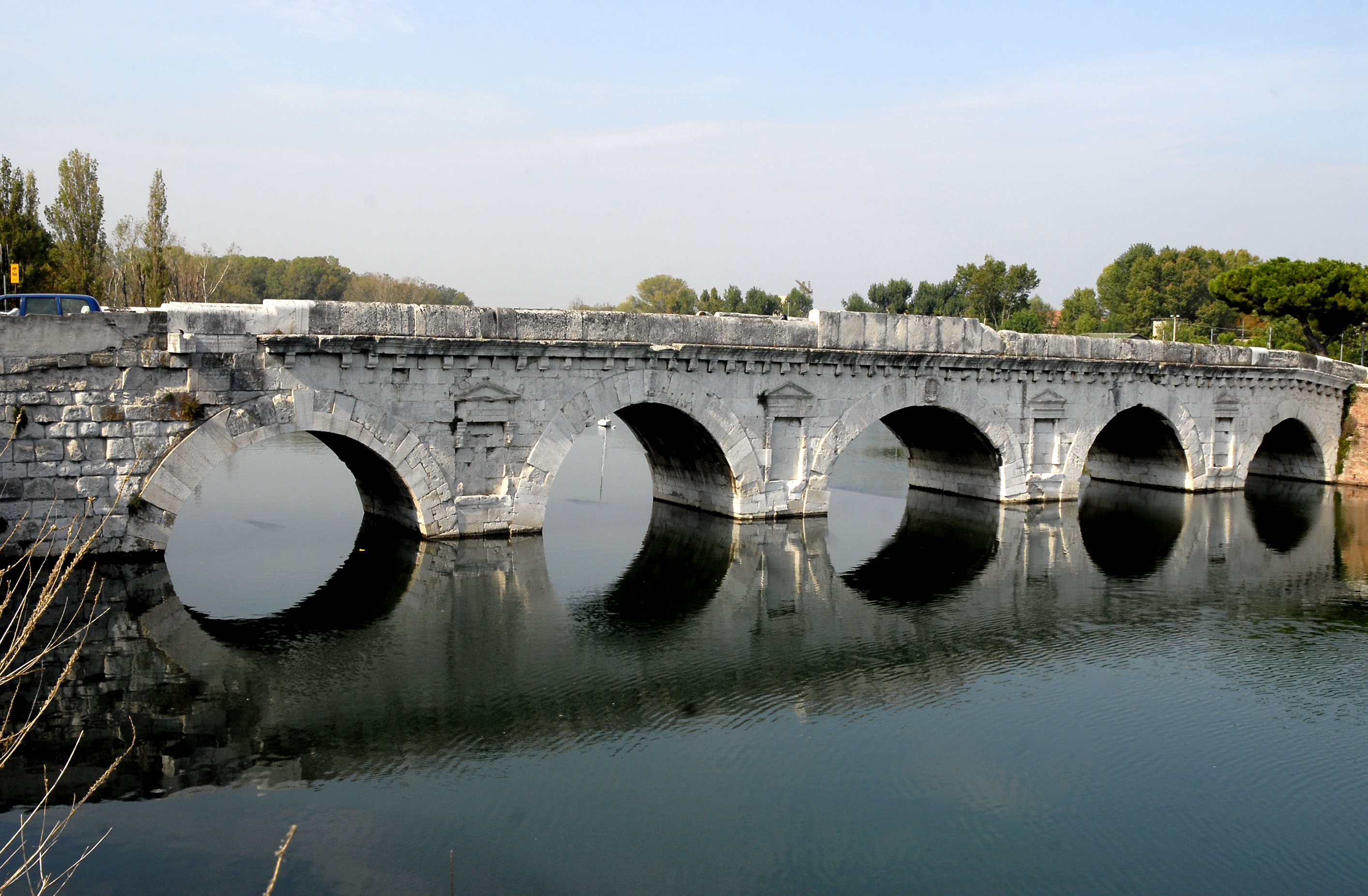
- Ponte di Tiberio, September 2007
  Ponte di Tiberio. Constructed between 14 and 21 AD under the reigns of emperors Augustus and Tiberius, the bridge over the Marecchia was built to showcase the impressiveness of Roman monumental infrastructure, and it is the oldest surviving Roman bridge to be decorated with Greek orders. Andrea Palladio considered the Ponte di Tiberio "the most beautiful and the most worthy of consideration" of all the bridges he surveyed. It has been depicted by notable artists including Giovanni Bellini, Giovan Battista Piranesi, and Richard Wilson.
- Monumental Cemetery of Rimini. Consecrated in 1813, the Monumental Cemetery of Rimini is the final resting place of several prominent figures associated with Rimini, including Amintore Galli, Renzo Pasolini, and Federico Fellini.
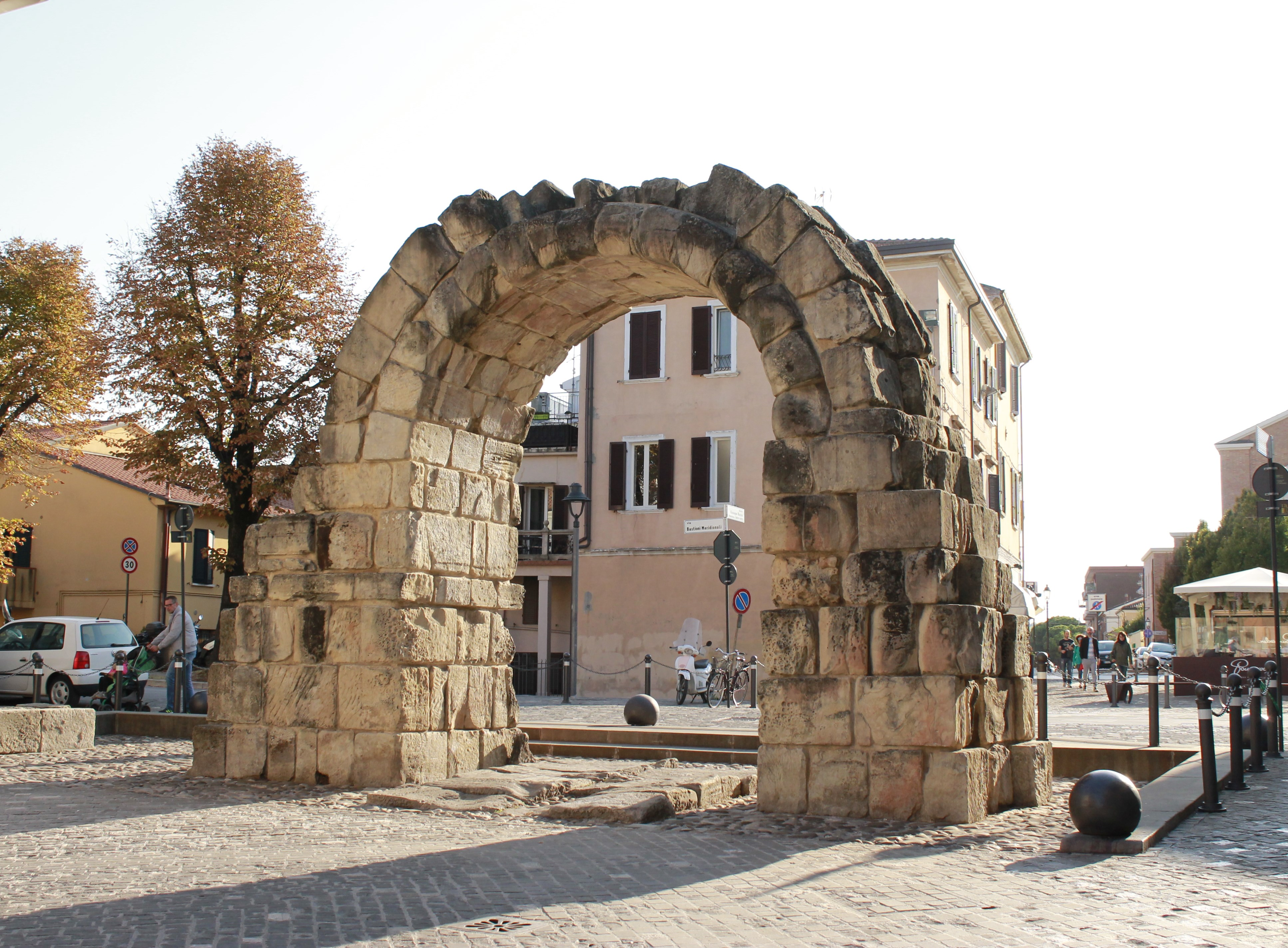
- Porta Montanara, September 2018
  Porta Montanara. Built after Sulla's civil war in the first century BC, the original construction of the ancient Roman city gate comprised two arches. The north-facing arch was walled as early as the first or second century AD, and incorporated into a medieval cellar. It was uncovered by Allied aerial bombardment during the Second World War. After Rimini's liberation, the south-facing arch was destroyed by the occupying Allied forces to facilitate the passage of tanks through the city. In 1949, the remaining arch was deconstructed and reassembled in the courtyard of the Tempio Malatestiano. Porta Montanara was restored near its original location in 2004, at the southern end of Rimini's cardo maximus, on the road to the valley of the Marecchia.
- Fontana dei Quattro Cavalli. The fountain is one of the symbols of Rimini as a seaside resort, built in 1928 by riminese sculptor Filogenio Fabbri. Demolished in 1954, was accurately reconstructed in 1983, recomposing the original parts. The fountain features a large circular basin, overlooked by four marine horses which sustain the superior basin.
- Fontana della Pigna
- Monument to Pope Paul V
- Torre dell'Orologio. The clocktower was built in 1547 in Piazza Tre Martiri, replacing the ancient "beccherie" (public butcher's), and reconstructed in 1759 by Giovan Francesco Buonamici. In 1875, the top of the tower was ruined due to an earthquake, and it was restored in 1933. The clock, which dates back to 1562, overlooks a perpetual calendar assembled in 1750, decorated by terracotta panels depicting zodiacal signs, months and lunar phases. The central, blind arch of the porch houses the memorial of the victims of World War II.

==== Attractions ====
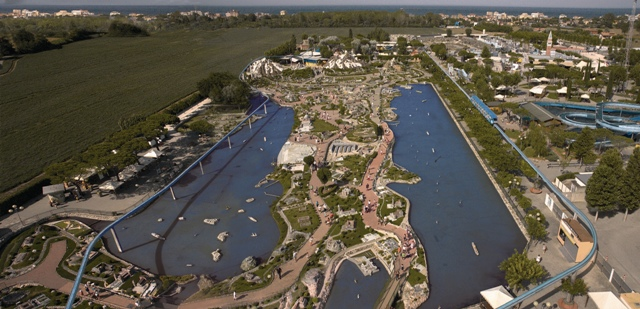
- Aerial view of Italia in Miniatura, June 2012
  Italia in Miniatura (in Viserba). Opened on 4 July 1970, Italia in Miniatura is Italy's fourth-oldest theme park, and attracts 500,000 visitors per year. The miniature park features 273 polyurethane models over an outdoor area of 85,000 square metres (910,000 sq ft). As well as Italian monuments, the models include European landmarks and geographic features such as mountains and volcanoes. A 1:5 reproduction of 119 buildings in Venice can be traversed with a gondola ride along the Grand Canal. Other attractions include a driving school, a suspended monorail, interactive spaces dedicated to science education, a parrot aviary, hot air balloons, a log flume, and a Pinocchio-themed train ride.

==== Archaeological sites ====
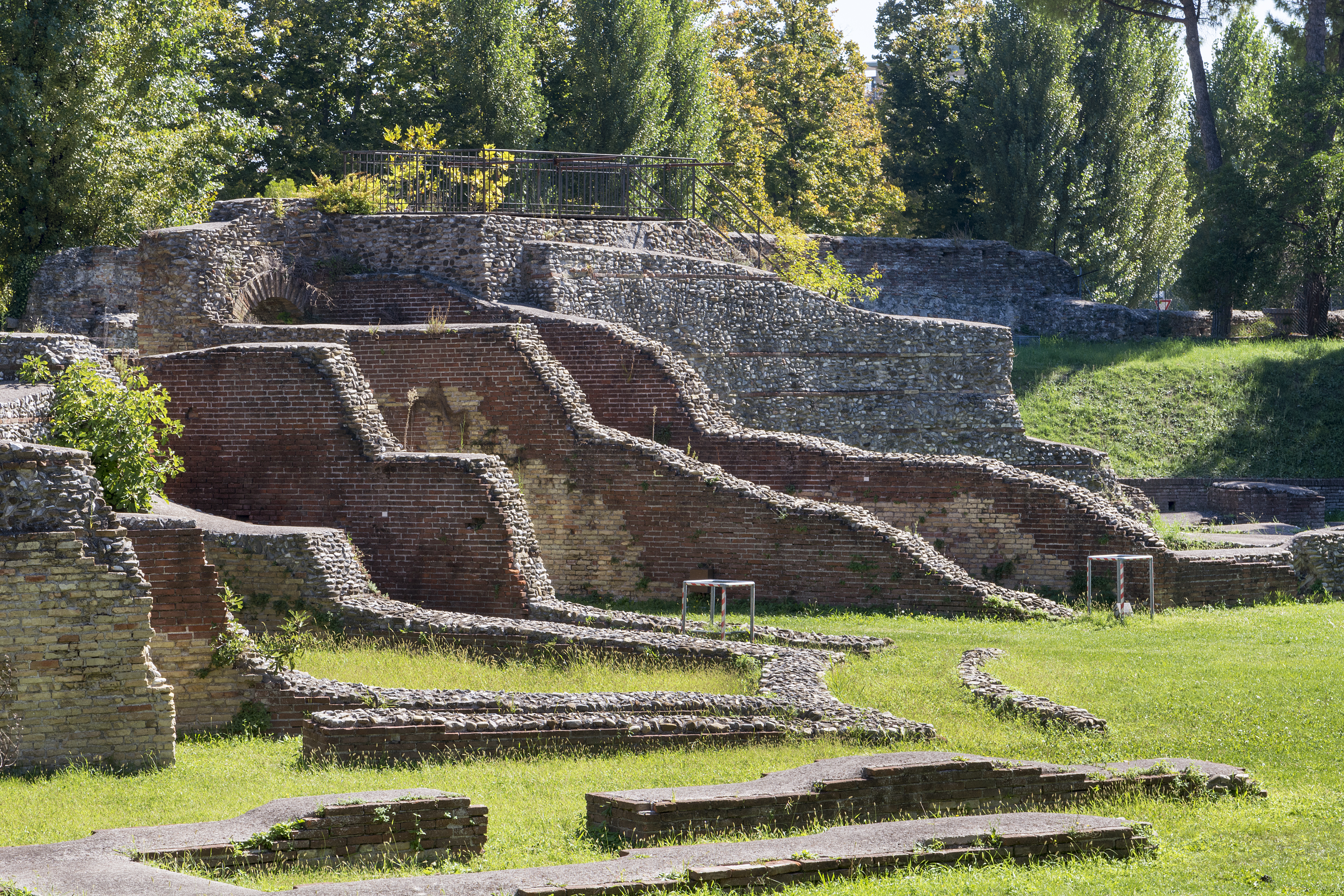
- The ruins of the Roman amphiteatre
  Roman amphitheater (2nd century). The amphitheater was erected alongside the ancient coast line, and had two orders of porticoes with 60 arcades. It had elliptical shape, with axes of 117.7 by 88 metres (386 by 289 ft). The arena measured 73 by 44 metres (240 by 144 ft), not much smaller than the greatest Roman amphitheatres: the edifice could house up to 15,000 spectators.
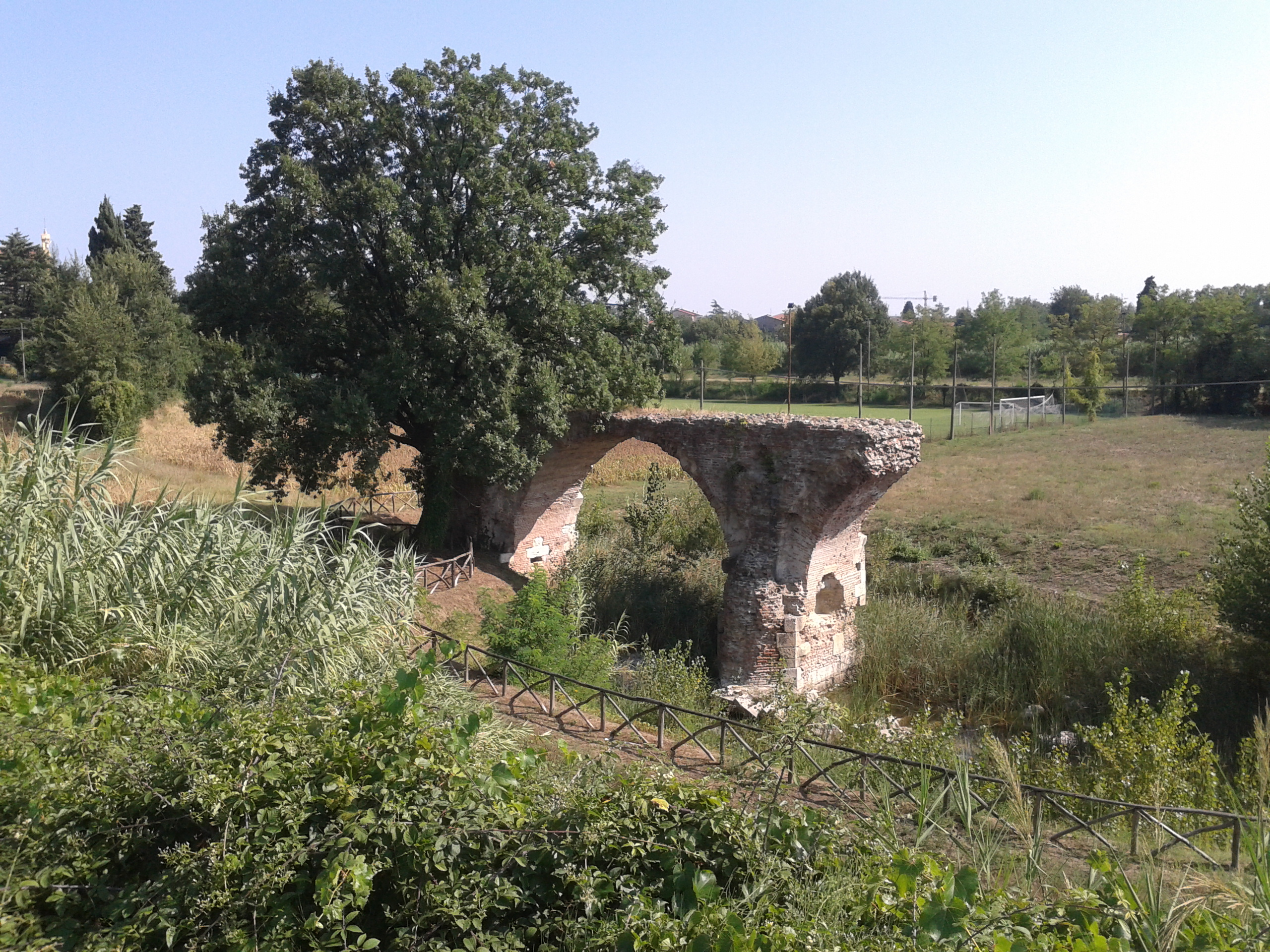
- Ponte di San Vito, August 2013
  Ponte di San Vito (in San Vito). Dating to the reign of emperor Augustus, only a 14th-century arch above the original Augustan stones remains of the Augustan bridge, which was likely monumental, with a total length of approximately 90 metres (300 feet), and numbering eight or more arches. In recent centuries, Riminese historians have claimed the bridge as the place where Julius Caesar crossed the Rubicon. In October 2022, Rimini's municipal government incorporated the arch into a public park.

== Parks and recreation ==
Rimini has an extensive parks system, with 1.3 million square metres of parks and gardens inside the urban area and a total of 2.8 million square metres of green areas inside the city limits, including river parks, sport facilities and natural areas.

The city's park system includes a series of large urban parks, created along the former Marecchia and Ausa riverbeds, neighbourhood parks and gardens and tree-lined boulevards.

The main parks of the city are XXV Aprile Park, Giovanni Paolo II Park, Alcide Cervi Park, Fabbri Park, Ghirlandetta Park, Federico Fellini Park, Pertini Park in Marebello and Briolini Park in San Giuliano Mare. Every Saturday, XXV Aprile Park hosts one of the Italy's thirteen (as of 2022) parkruns.

In Rimini there are about 42,000 public trees, belonging to 190 different species, predominantly lime, planes, maples, poplars, pines and oaks. 23 of these are old trees, protected as "monumental trees" for their age and their naturalistic value, such as the London plane of piazza Malatesta, the downy oak of Giovanni Paolo II Park, the cypresses of Sant'Agostino, the elm of Viale Vespucci and the lime trees of San Fortunato.

The city's cycling network is articulated inside the main parks and boulevards, linking the most important monuments, tourist attractions, beaches, meeting places, offering various opportunities to different use categories, including urban travels, mountain bike and cyclotourism.

The urban cycling network is connected, through XXV Aprile Park, to the cycle route which links Rimini and Saiano, along the river Marecchia.

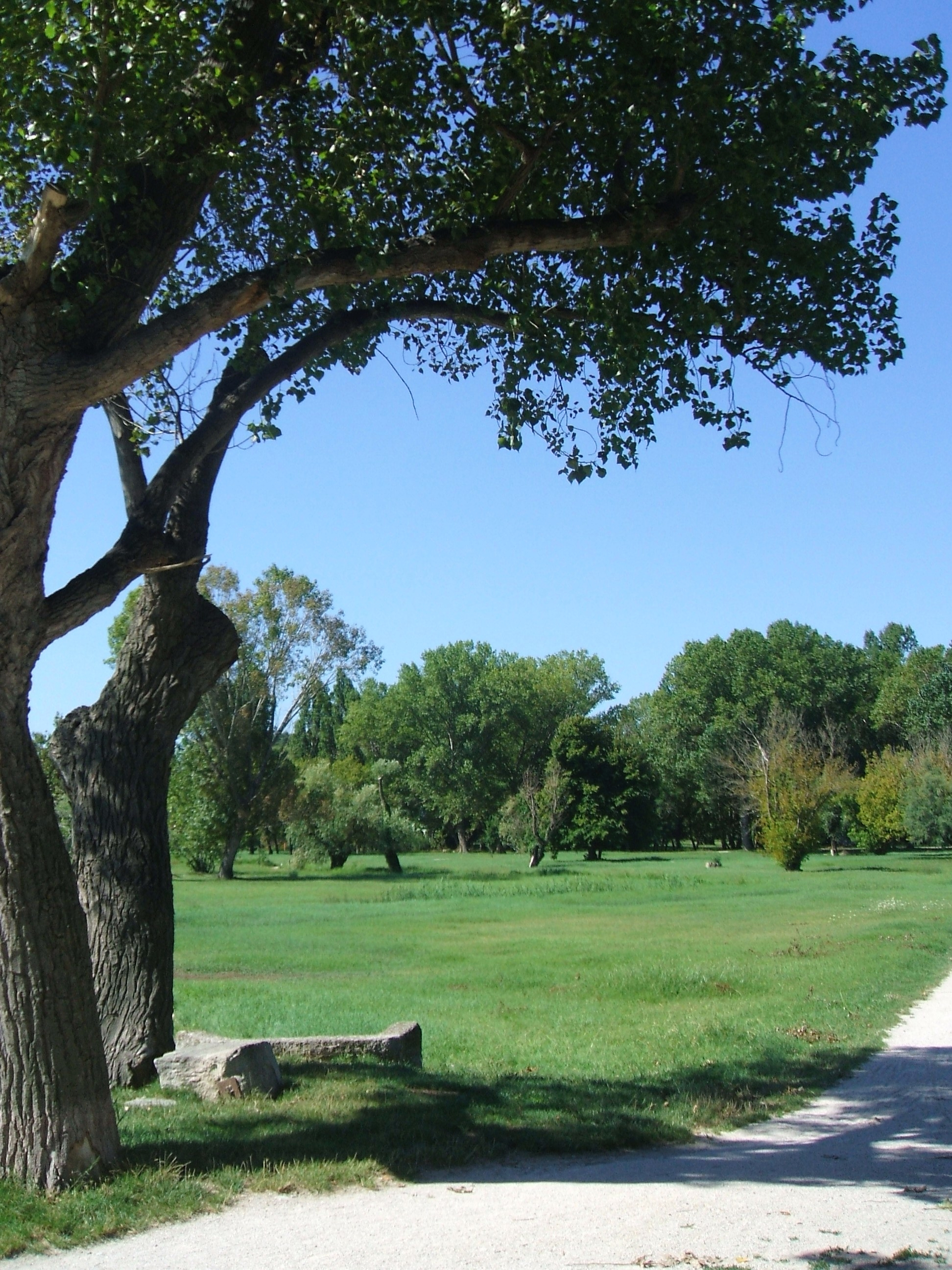
XXV Aprile Park

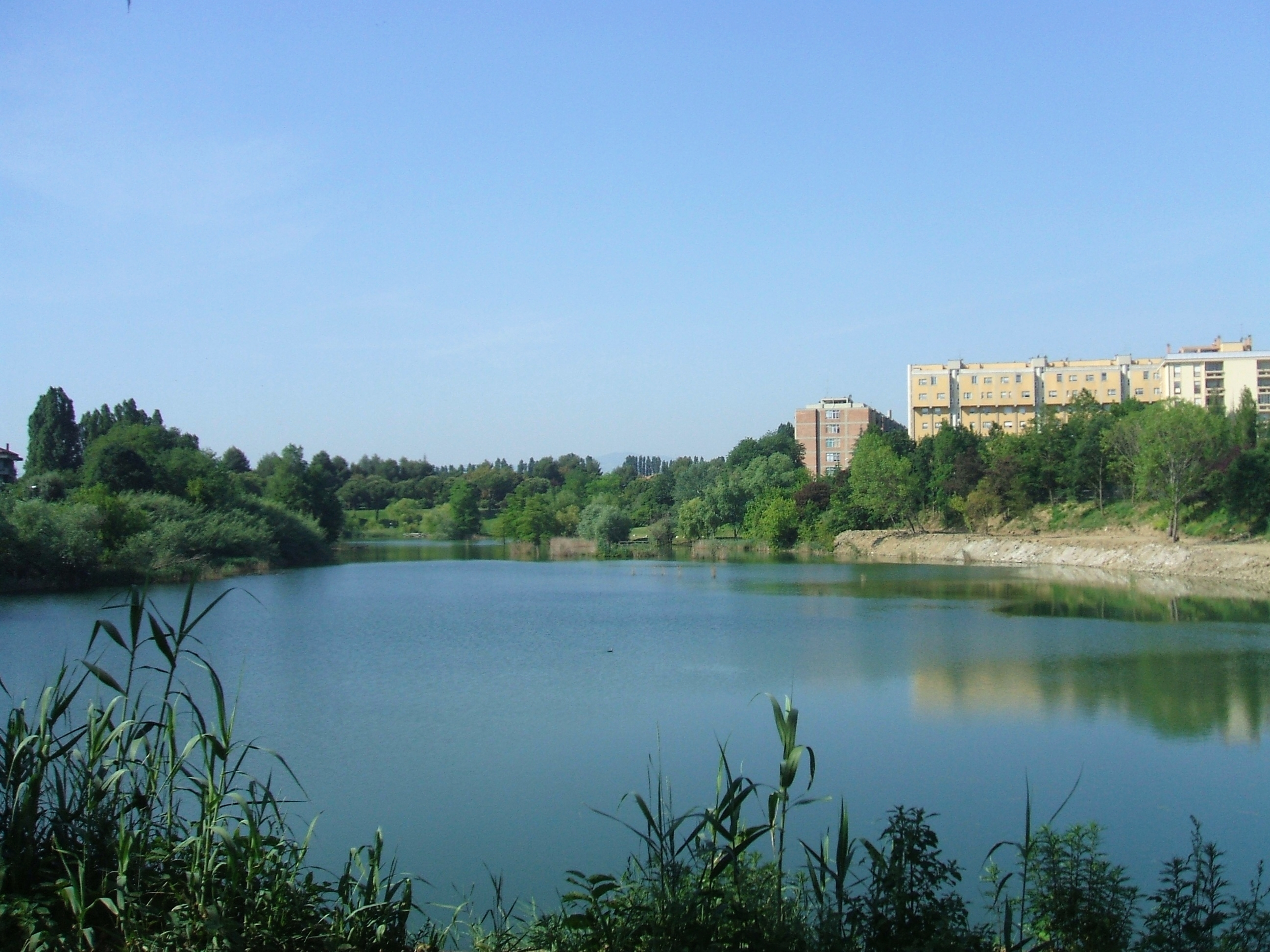
Giovanni Paolo II Park

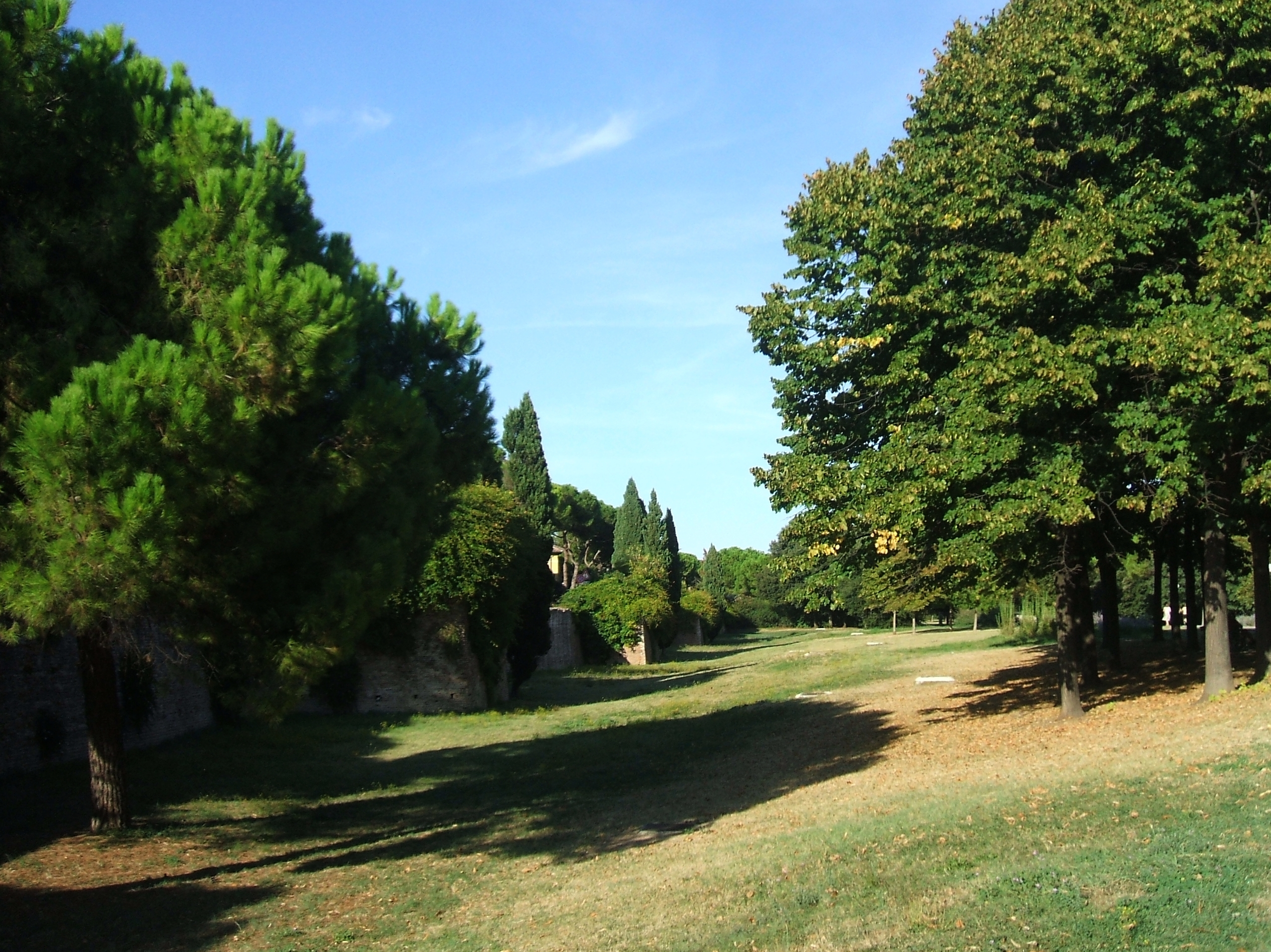
Alcide Cervi Park

== Culture ==
=== Museums ===
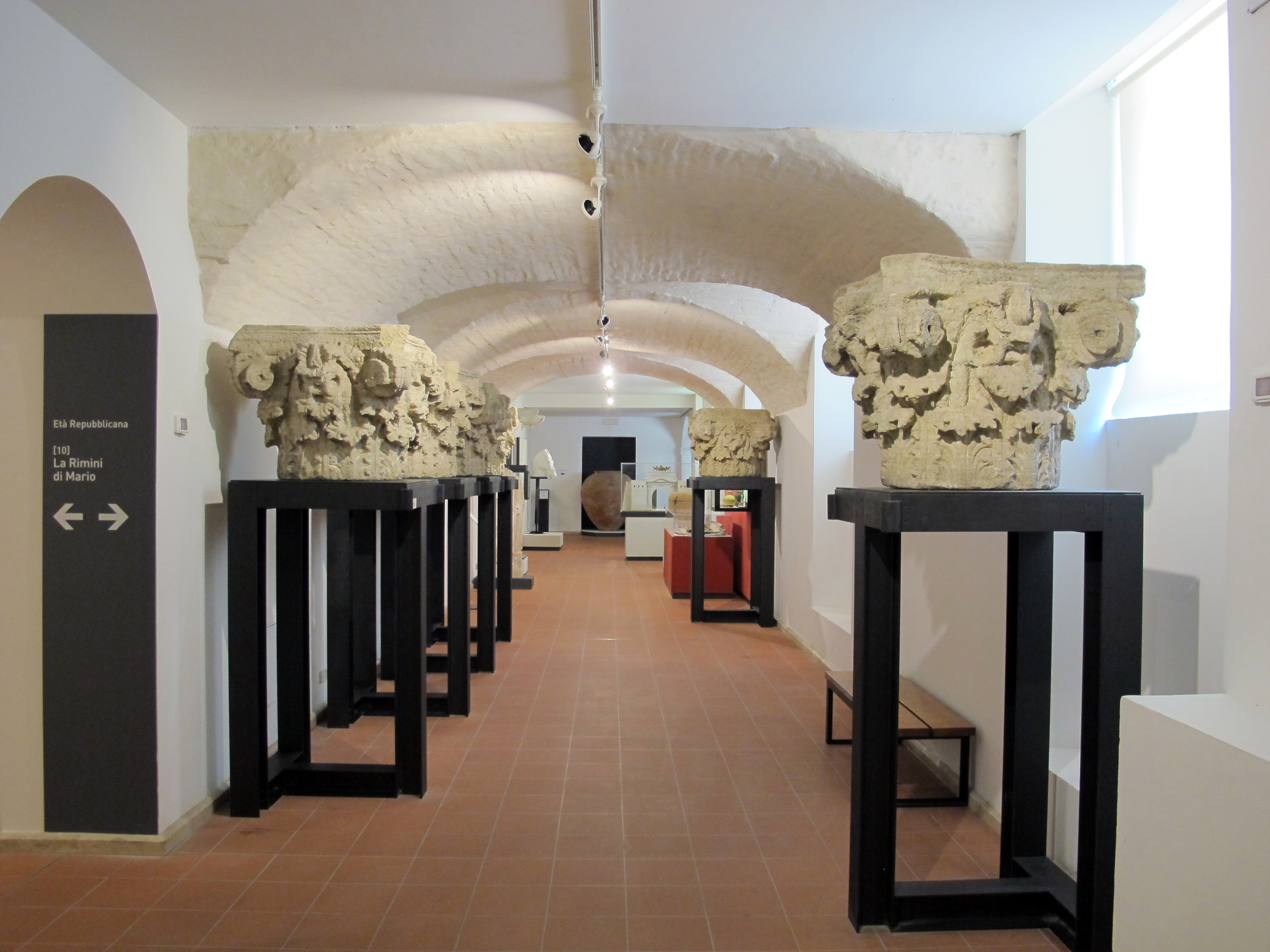
City Museum, Archaeological Department

==== City Museum ====
The City Museum (Museo della Città), is Rimini's main and oldest museum. It was inaugurated in 1872 as the Archaeology Gallery, at the ground floor of Palazzo Gambalunga, thanks to Riminese historian Luigi Tonini, who researched and studied the city's archaeological heritage. The Archaeology Gallery was conceived as a collection of Etruscan civilization and Roman antiquities, found in Rimini and in the surrounding countryside. In 1923, it moved to the monastery of San Francesco, and was expanded with a section of medieval art in 1938. Its collections avoided the destruction of the Second World War after they were moved to shelters in Spadarolo and Novafeltria. In 1964, the collections moved to Palazzo Visconti and finally, from 1990, to the Collegio dei Gesuiti, a large Jesuit convent designed by Bolognese architect Alfonso Torreggiani, built in 1749.

In the Archaeological department are exhibited grave goods from Villanovian tombs of Verucchio and Covignano, architectural pieces, sculptures, mosaics, ceramics, coins of Republican and Imperial eras, and the exceptional medical kit from the Domus del Chirurgo. The collection of the Roman Lapidary, exhibited in the inner courtyard of the convent, has funerary monuments, epigraphies and milestones.

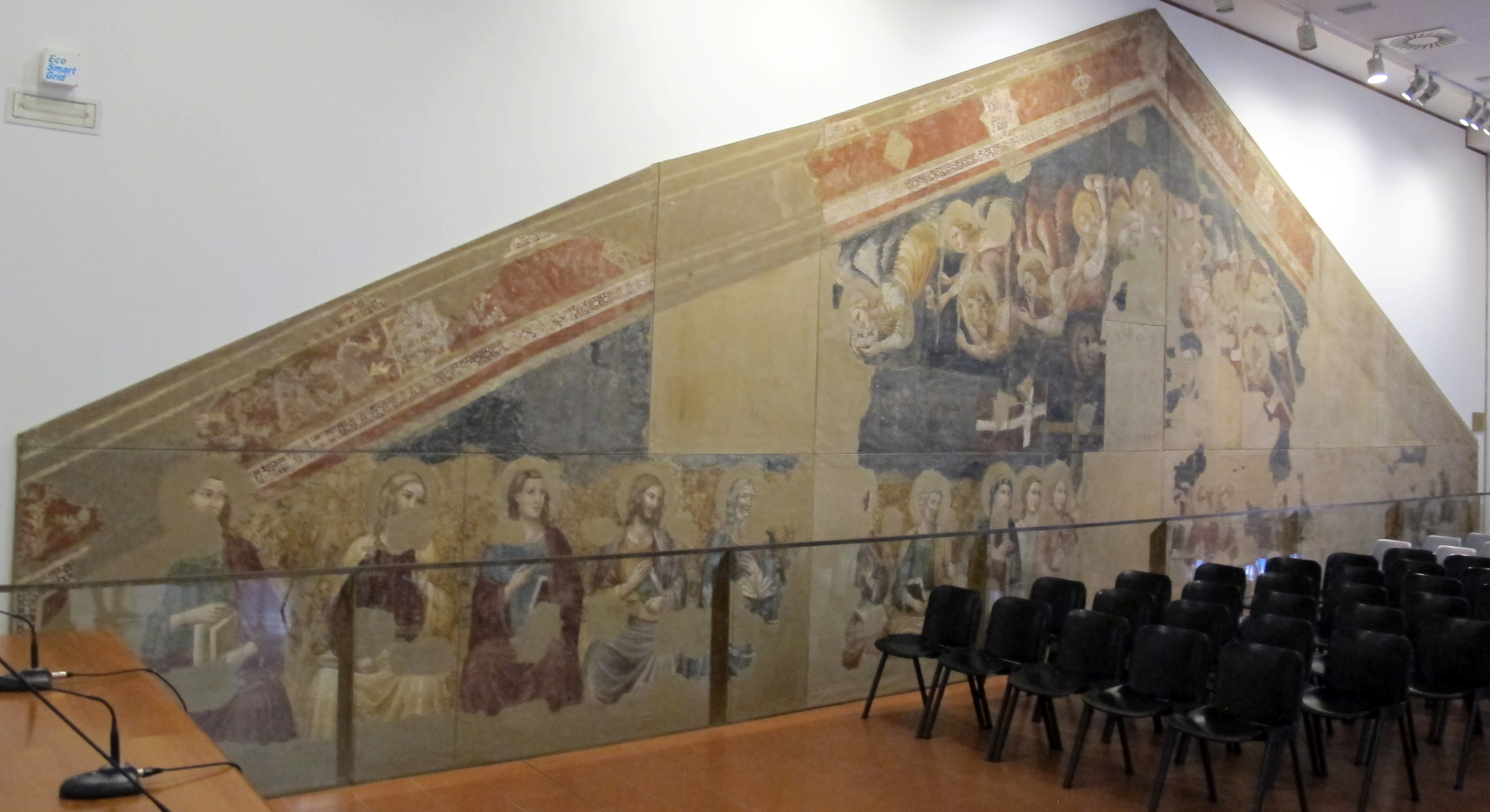
City Museum, Last Judgement Room

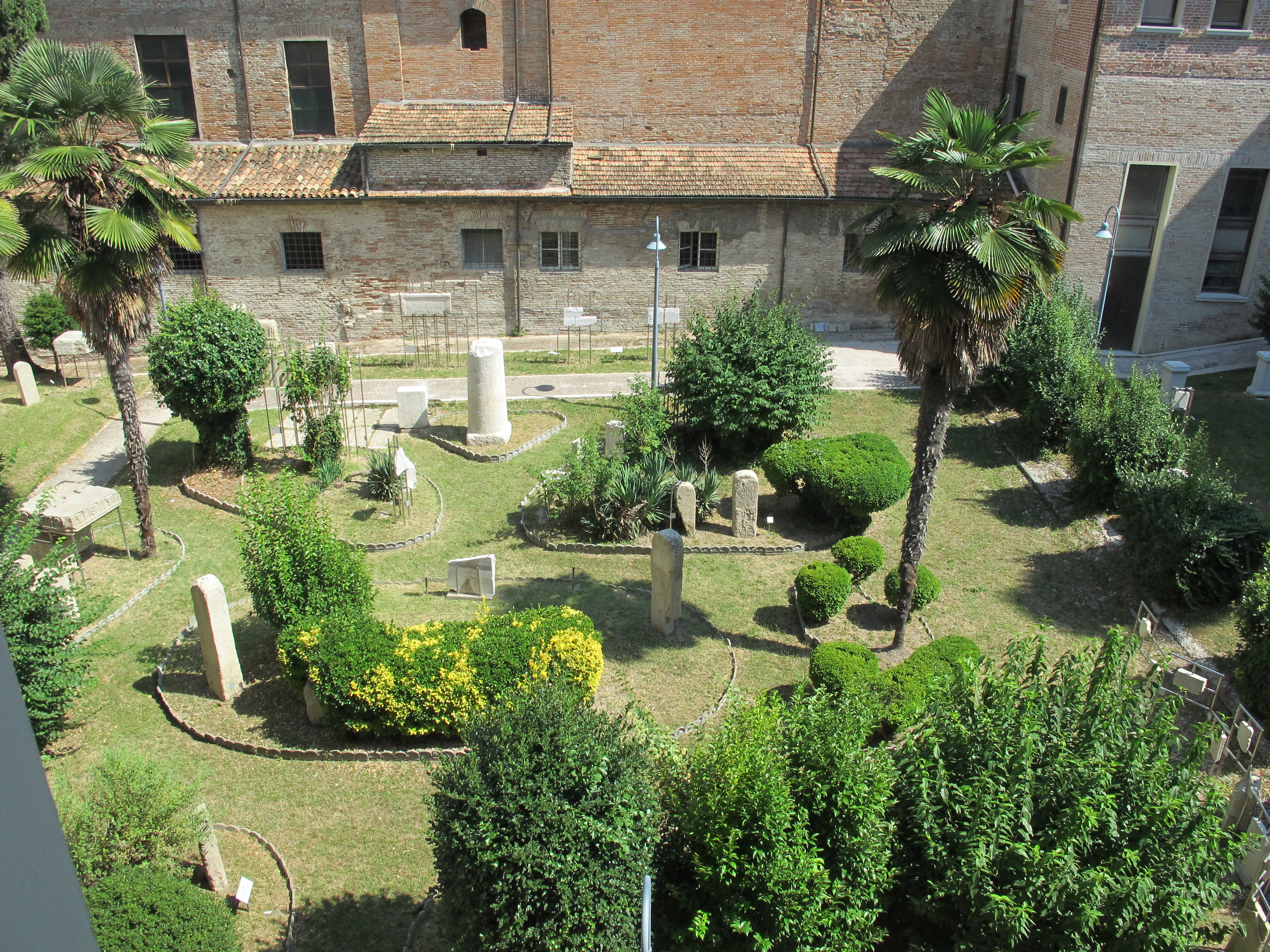
The Roman Lapidary, exhibited in the inner courtyard of the City Museum

The Medieval and Modern Art departments include collections of paintings, sculptures and art objects by artists from Romagna (Giovanni da Rimini, Giuliano da Rimini, Guido Cagnacci), Emilia (Guercino, Vittorio Maria Bigari), Tuscany (Domenico Ghirlandaio, Agostino di Duccio) and Veneto (Giovanni Bellini), from 14th to 19th century. The City Museum arranges temporary exhibitions and promotes researches, study and restoration activities of the city's historical and artistic heritage.

=== Other museums ===
The Fellini Museum, dedicated to Federico Fellini, houses exhibitions of documents, drawings, scenographies and costumes related to the Riminese film director. It opened in 2021 and is spread across the Castel Sismondo, Piazza Malatesta, and Fulgor Palace.

The Museum of Glances (Museo degli Sguardi) is housed in Villa Alvarado, on the Covignano hill. It was inaugurated by explorer Delfino Dinz Rialto on 9 September 1972, then known as the Museum of Primitive Arts (Museo delle Arti Primitivi), and hosted in the Palazzo del Podestà. In 2005, it was rededicated as one of Italy's main museums on the cultures of Africa, Oceania, and the pre-Columbian Americas. 600 works are exhibited in the museum, whose collections number over 7,000 objects.

The Maritime and Small Fishing Museum (Museo della Piccola Pesca e della Marineria), in Viserbella, exhibits Rimini's nautical history through a collection of boats, fishing tools, photographs and a large seashells collection, with pieces from all over the Mediterranean Sea.

The Multimedia Archaeological Museum (Museo Archeologico Multimediale) underneath the Amintore Galli Theatre showcases excavations from the theatre's renovation that uncovered a Roman domus, Byzantine finds, and the ancient Malatesta city walls underneath the theatre. The theatre also includes spaces dedicated to the history of Italian theatre, the architecture of the Galli Theatre, and the life and music of Giuseppe Verdi.

There are two private museums outside the city centre: the Aviation Museum (Museo dell'Aviazione) in Sant'Aquilina, close to the Sammarinese border, and the Motorcycling National Museum (Museo Nazionale del Motociclo) in Casalecchio.

=== Libraries ===
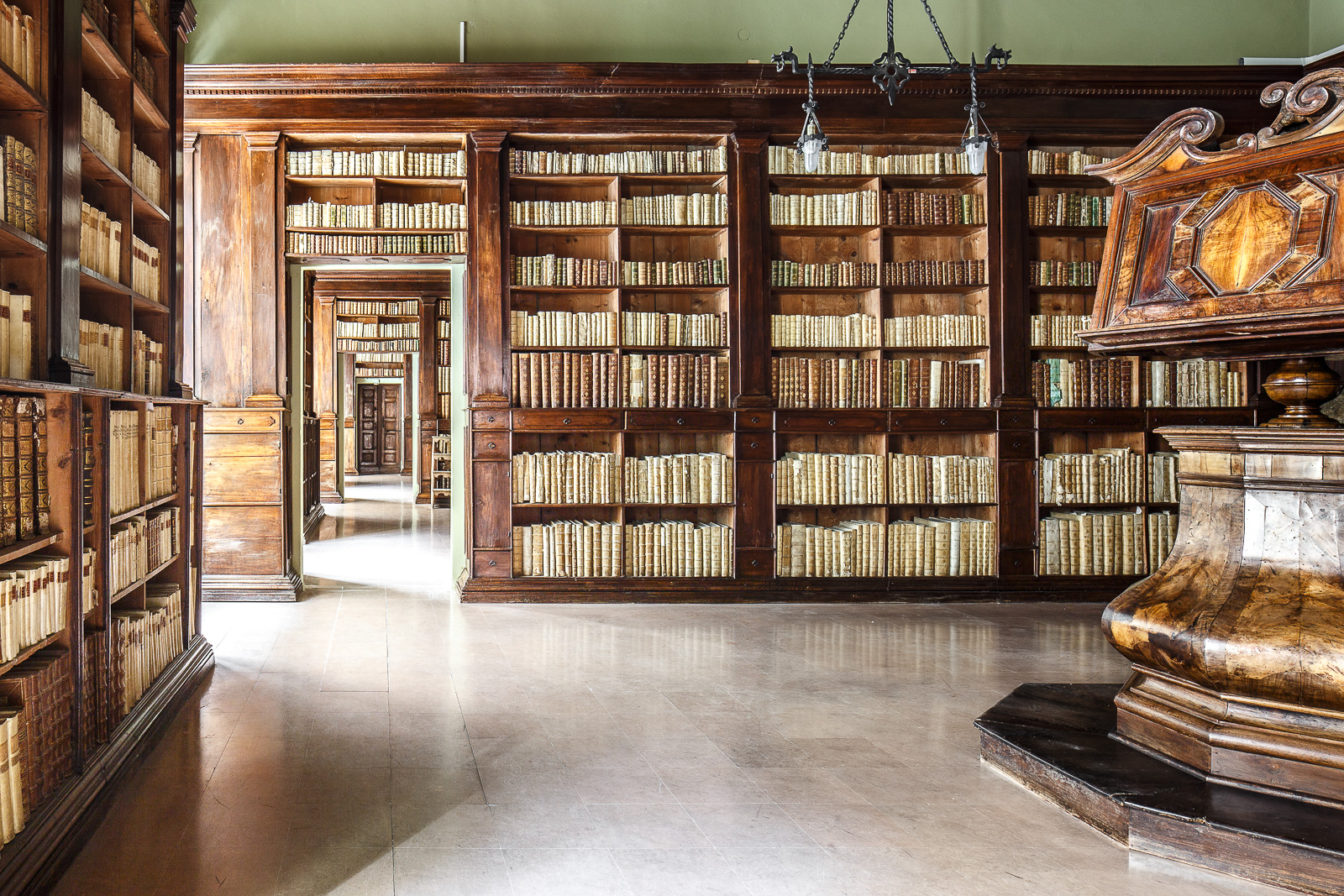
The 17th-century rooms of the Biblioteca Civica Gambalunga, September 2015

Founded in 1619 following a bequest by Riminese lawyer Alessandro Gambalunga, the Biblioteca Civica Gambalunga holds over 300,000 physical exhibits, including 293,879 books. Among notable exhibits include an 11th-century Evangelarium, an early 12th-century codex of Honorius Augustodunensis, a codex by Hugh of Saint Victor, and letters from Giovanni Bianchi. A collection from Adolphe Noël des Vergers records the French project for a collection of Latin epigraphy and other 19th-century archaeological ventures.

Other libraries in Rimini include a library of the University of Bologna, a school library in San Giuliano Mare, a bioethics institute's library, the diocesan library in San Fortunato, and a medical-scientific library in Rimini's hospital.

=== Theatre and film ===
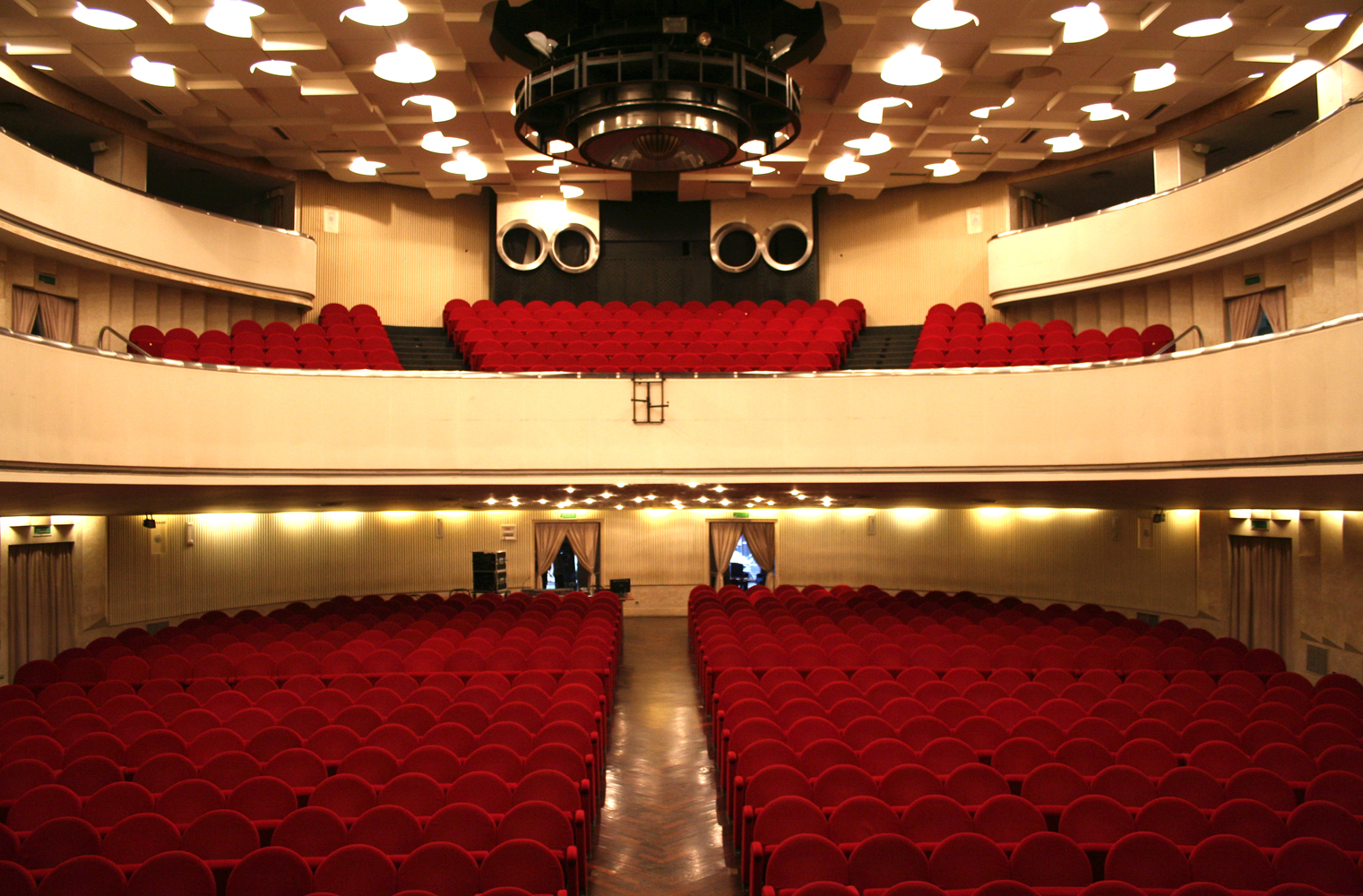
Teatro Novelli's Hall

The first stable theatre in Rimini is documented since 1681, when the city council decided on the transformation of the Palazzo dell'Arengo's main hall into a large theatre hall, hosting shows of amateur dramatics companies and the young Carlo Goldoni, who was studying philosophy in Rimini at that time. Between 1842 and 1857, the Teatro Nuovo Comunale, now the Amintori Galli Theatre, was built to a neoclassical design by Luigi Poletti; it is considered one of his architectural masterpieces. On 16 August 1857, the theatre hosted the world premiere of Giuseppe Verdi's Aroldo, which was a major event in the city, attracting many foreign visitors. During the Second World War, the theatre was severely damaged by Allied bombardment. Following a complete restoration in the 2010s, the theatre reopened on 28 October 2018.

Rimini appeared on the movie screen for the first time in some early footages, such as the documentary "Rimini l'Ostenda d'Italia" (1912), and in various Istituto Luce's newsreels in the Thirties. The film director Federico Fellini, was born and raised in Rimini, portrayed characters, places and atmospheres of his hometown through his movies, which however were almost entirely shot in Cinecittà's studios in Rome: I Vitelloni, 8 e ½ (Oscar award in 1964), I clowns, Amarcord (Oscar award in 1975). Other Italian movies filmed in Rimini includes "La prima notte di quiete" by Valerio Zurlini, "Rimini Rimini" by Sergio Corbucci, "Abbronzatissimi" by Bruno Gaburro, "Sole negli occhi" by Andrea Porporati, "Da zero a dieci" by Luciano Ligabue and "Non pensarci" by Gianni Zanasi.

=== Music ===
The earliest musician from Rimini was Saint Arduino (10th century); a musical tradition of some distinction was witnessed in the following century by the presence of a music school, named "Scuola cantorum", at the Cathedral of Santa Colomba. French composer Guillaume Dufay stayed in Rimini, at Malatesta's court until 1427. In 1518 Pietro Aaron became the first choirmaster of the Cathedral's chapel. In 1690 Carlo Tessarini, violinist and composer, was born in Rimini. The city also gave birth to the musician Benedetto Neri, professor at the Academy of Music in Milan. On 16 August 1857, Rimini's New Municipal Theatre hosted the world premiere of Giuseppe Verdi's Aroldo.

Between the late 19th and early 20th centuries, many social events and dance parties took place at the Bathing Establishment, hosting celebrities such as soprano Elena Bianchini-Cappelli and tenor Enrico Caruso.

In recent years, the city inspired the homonymous music album by Fabrizio De André, released in 1978, and it is cited in various popular Italian and foreign songs by Fabrizio De André, Francesco Guccini, Nino Rota, Elvis Costello, Fred Buscaglione. Also born in Rimini were the songwriter Samuele Bersani and the composer and music producer Carlo Alberto Rossi, author of some of Mina's songs.

=== Cuisine ===
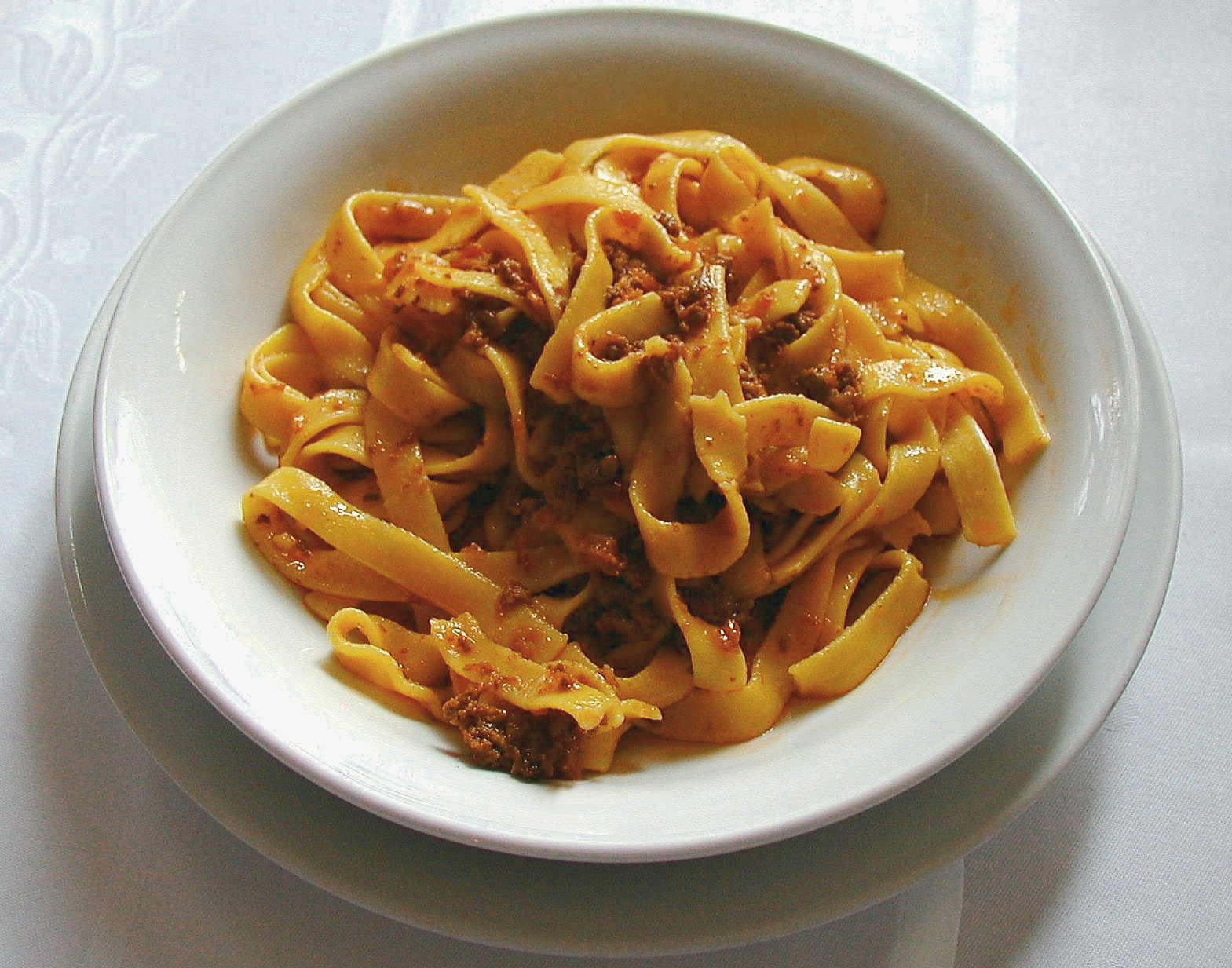
Tagliatelle with bolognese sauce

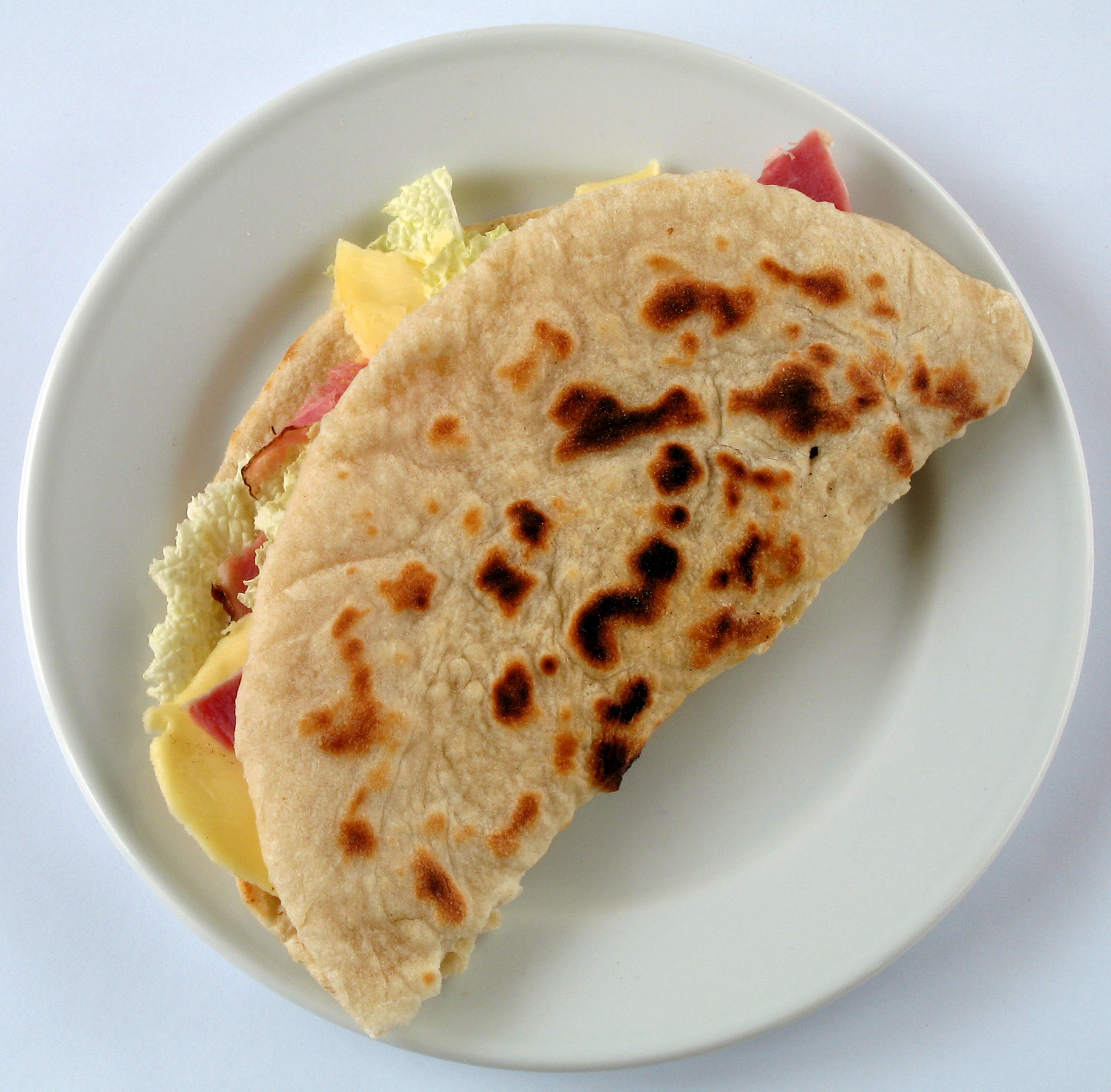
The Piadina Romagnola

Rimini's cuisine is simple and characterized by intense flavours and it is indissolubly related to the traditions of rural culture, influenced by the city's location—between the sea and the hills and near the border between Romagna and Marche.

The traditional first course is pasta, which includes regular pasta, pasta in broth and baked pasta, prepared in many different shapes. Almost all pasta dishes require a base of "sfoglia", a dough of eggs and flour, handmade with a rolling pin. First courses include cappelletti, passatelli in broth, lasagne, cannelloni, nidi di rondine, ravioli, tagliatelle, garganelli, maltagliati, gnocchi and strozzapreti, seasoned with bolognese sauce or a dressing of butter and sage.

Second courses include meat dishes, such as pollo alla cacciatora, rabbit in porchetta, meat-filled zucchini, sausages and mixed grilled meats, and fish dishes, like barbecues of atlantic mackerels, sardines, rotisseries of oily fishes, sepias with peas, fried squids and gianchetti (known here as "omini nudi").

Piada is a flatbread of ancient traditions, thin and crumbly, obtained from a dough of flour, water, lard and salt, and baked on a scorching "testo" of terracotta or cast iron. It is often accompanied by grilled meats or fishes, sausages, gratinée vegetables, salami, prosciutto, fresh cheeses and country herbs. Cassoni are stuffed flatbreads similar to piada, with various fillings: country herbs, potatoes and sausages, tomato and mozzarella. Side dishes include mixed salads, gratinée vegetables, roasted potatoes, sautée bladder campion leaves, marinated olives with dill, garlic and orange zest.

Traditional desserts are ciambella, Carnevale's fried fiocchetti and castagnole, zuppa inglese (a rich dessert with custard, savoiardi and liqueurs), caramelized figs, peaches in white wine and strawberries in red wine. Native to Rimini, piada dei morti is a sweet focaccia topped with raisins, almonds, walnuts, and pine nuts, traditionally eaten in November for All Souls' Day.

Typical local products are squacquerone (a fresh cheese) and saba, a grape syrup used to prepare desserts. Quality extra virgin olive oil is traditionally produced in Rimini area since ancient times. The wines include Sangiovese, Trebbiano, Pagadebit, Rebola, Cabernet Sauvignon and Albana, a dessert wine of Roman origins.

== Economy ==
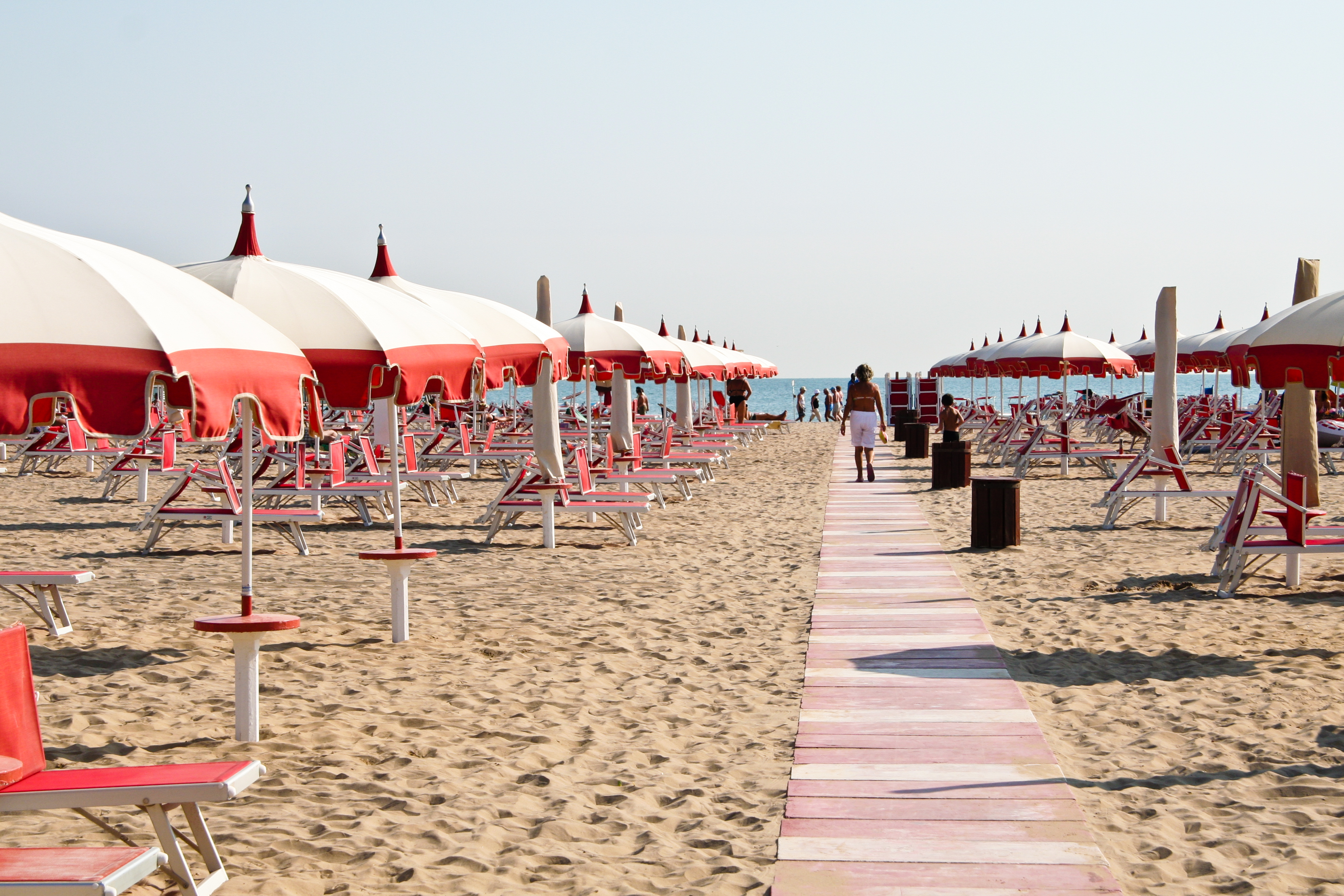
Rimini Beach

=== Tourism ===
Rimini is a major international tourist destination and seaside resort, among the most well known in Europe and the Mediterranean basin, thanks to a long sandy beach, bathing establishments, theme parks and opportunities for leisure and spare time. The economy of the city is mainly based on tourism, whose development started in the first half of the 19th century and increased after World War II. In 2017, the city welcomed over 57 million tourists.

Rimini's origins as a seaside resort date to the foundation of the first bathing establishment, the oldest on the Adriatic Sea, in 1843. The width of the beach, the gentle gradient of the sea bed, the equipment of bathing establishments, the luxurious hotels, the mildness of the climate, the richness of curative waters, the prestigious social events, made Rimini a renowned tourist destination among the Italian and European aristocracy during the Belle Époque.

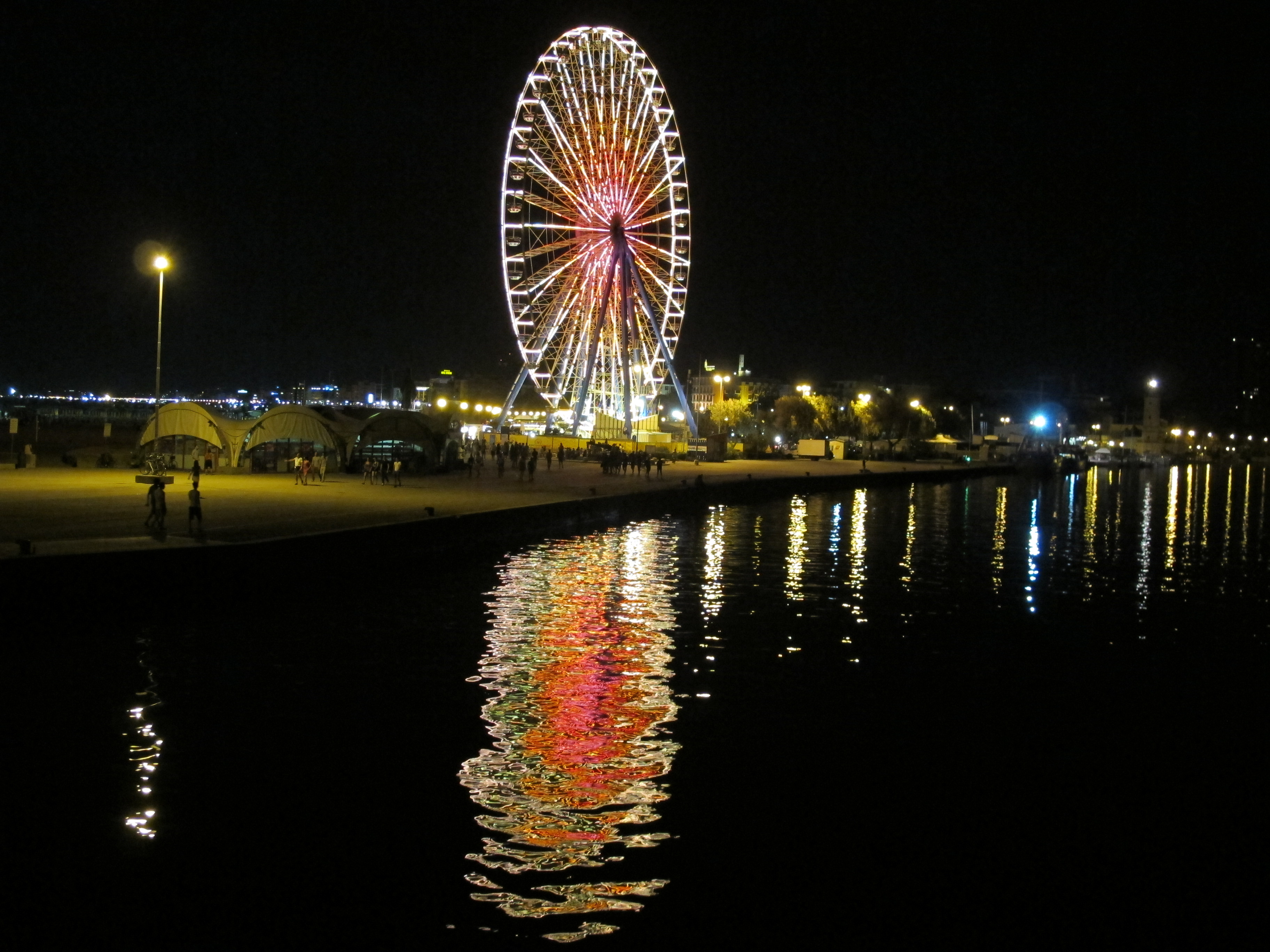
The ferris wheel and the harbour at night

Tourism in Rimini started as therapeutic stay (thalassotherapy, hydrotherapy and heliotherapy), evolving into elite vacation in the late 19th century, into middle-class tourism during the fascist era and finally into mass tourism in the postwar period.

The touristic season in Rimini includes the annual Notte rosa (Pink Night), a weekend cultural festival held in early July that includes exhibitions, music concerts, and firework displays. The festival is held across the riviera romagnola, over which it is estimated to attract two million visitors and revenues exceeding €200 million. Italy's third and fourth oldest theme parks were opened in Rimini: Fiabilandia in Rivazzura (1965) and Italia in Miniatura, a miniature park in Viserba (1970).

Rimini concentrates about a quarter of Emilia-Romagna's hotels, with over 1,000 hotels, more than 220 of which are open all year round, aside from apartment hotels, apartments, holiday homes, bed & breakfast and campings. Tourism is mainly based on seaside holidays, but also includes events, nightlife, culture, wellness, food and wine.

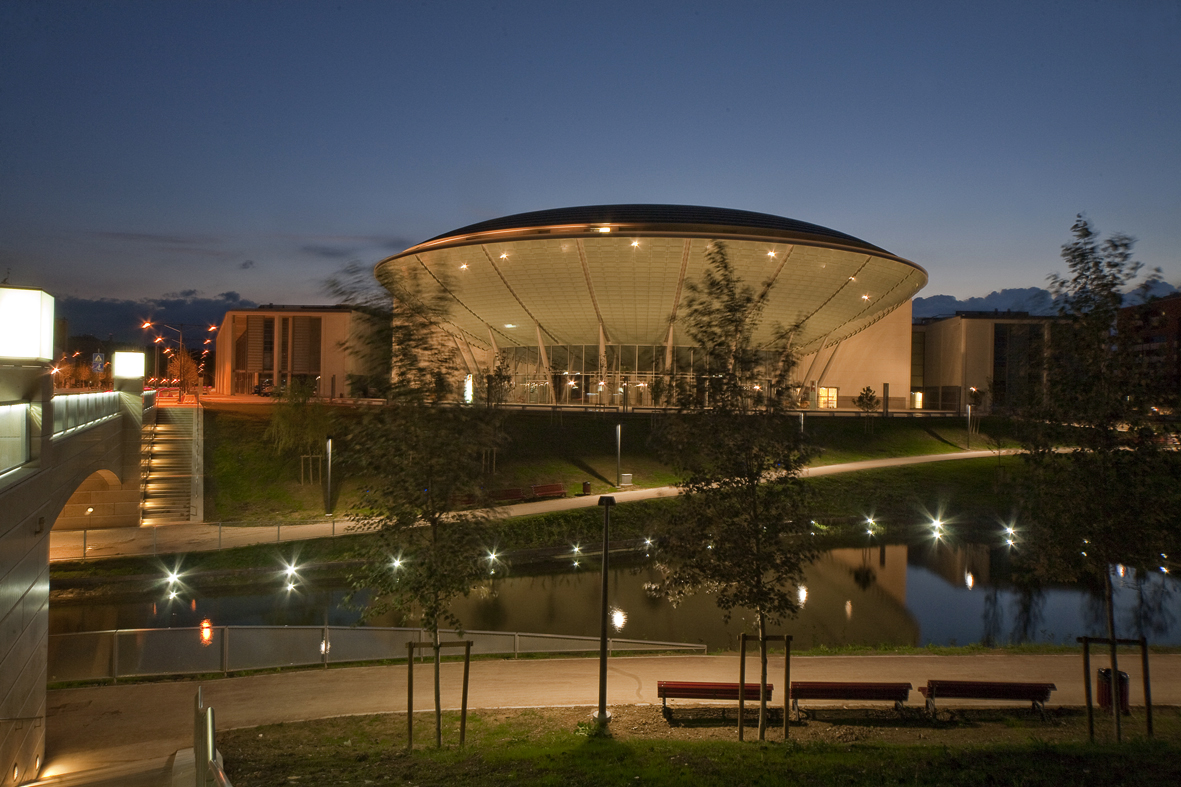
Rimini Palacongressi

=== Trade fairs and conventions ===
Rimini is among Italy's leading trade fair and convention sites. Relocated in 2001 to the city's west, Rimini Fiera comprises sixteen pavilions with 129,000 m^{2} (1,390,000 sq ft) of exhibit floor, and hosts trade fairs, sporting events, and musical performances, as well as the annual Rimini Meeting, a religious and cultural festival organised by Communion and Liberation, a lay Catholic movement. The majority of Rimini's hotels reopen for the conference season, which provides a flow of visitors to the city outside of the summer beach season. The dates of conferences are also used to set municipal regulations on the touristic season along the riviera.

The Fiera's previous site, on Via Monte Titano, was redeveloped in 2011 into Rimini Palacongressi, a smaller conference space. In 2015, the Fiera and Palacongressi were estimated to be worth about a tenth of the province of Rimini's gross domestic product.

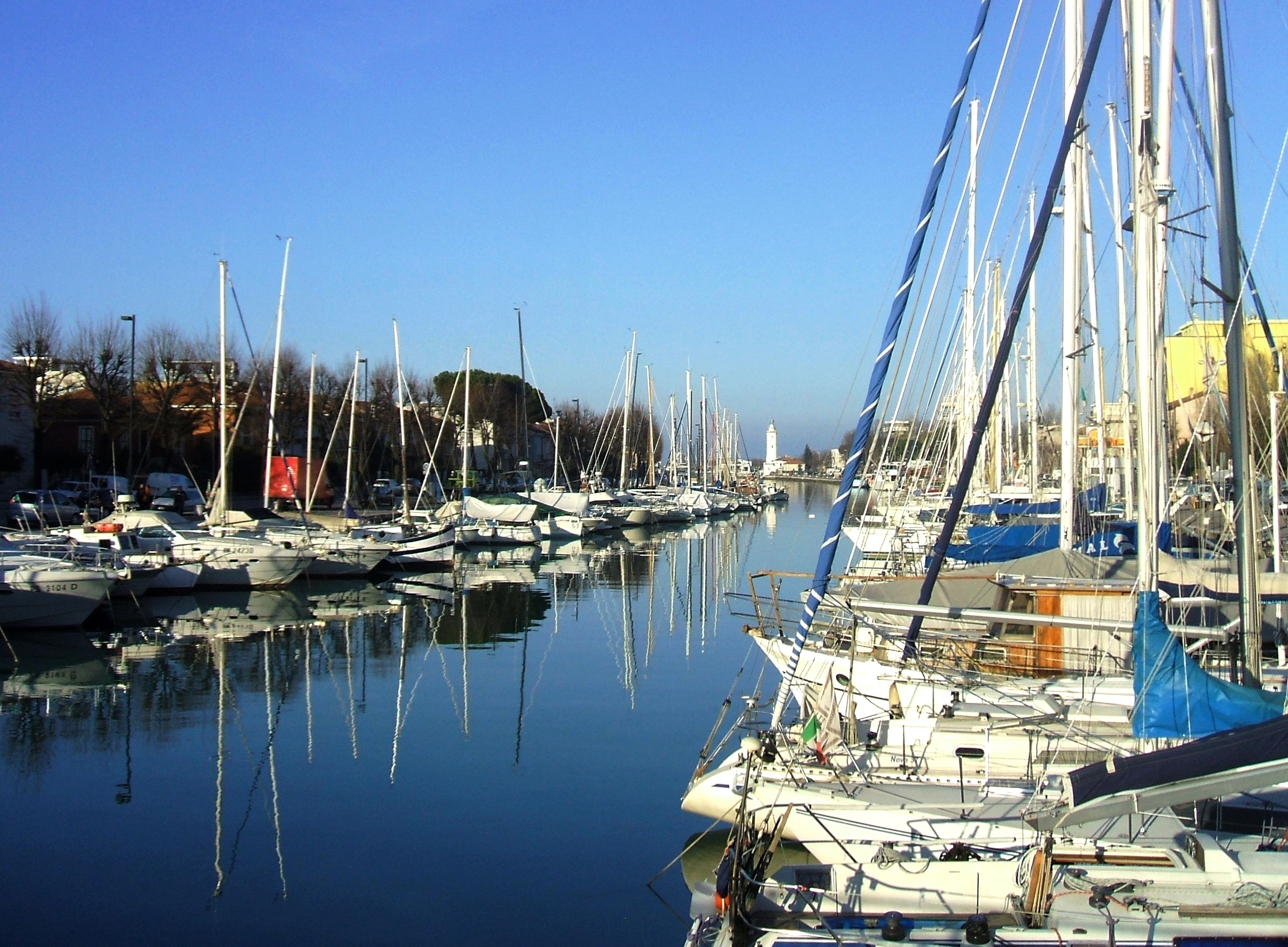
Rimini harbour in winter, with Rimini Lighthouse in the background

=== Industry and produce ===
The city's other economic sectors, such as services, commerce, construction industry, have been influenced by the development of tourism. Commerce is one of the main economic sectors, thanks to the presence of a large wholesale center, two hypermarkets, department stores, supermarkets and hundreds of shops and boutiques. Industry, less developed than tourism and services, includes various companies active in food industry, woodworking machineries, building constructions, furnishing, clothing and publishing. Notable companies are Bimota (motorcycles), SCM (woodworking machines), Trevi S.p.A. (electronic goods). Rimini is also seat of a historic railway works plant.

Agriculture and fishing were the city's main economic sources until the early 20th century. The most common crops, in terms of surface area, are alfalfa, wheat, durum wheat, grape vine, olive tree, barley and sorghum. Among fruit trees dominates apricot, peach and plum trees. Important are the traditional productions of wine (Sangiovese, Trebbiano, Rebola, Pagadebit, Albana wines) and extra virgin olive oil. The fishing industry can count on a fleet of about 100 fishing boats, the most consistent of Rimini's fishing department, which includes the coast between Cattolica and Cesenatico.

== Transport ==
Rimini is an important road and railway junction due to its geographic position at the southern tip of the Po Valley, where Adriatic coastal routes meet those extending northwest along the plains.

=== Roads ===
Rimini is the terminus of three ancient Roman roads: the Via Flaminia, which runs southeast along the Adriatic Sea, turning at Fanum Fortunae (Fano) to finish in Roma (Rome); the Via Aemilia, which runs northwest to reach Placentia (Piacenza); and the Via Popilia, which runs north along the Adriatic Sea to reach Atria (Adria), where it joined the Via Annia. Modern state roads replicate these roads:

- The SS9 state road runs from Rimini to San Donato Milanese, replicating the Via Aemilia.
- The SS16 state road runs along the Adriatic Sea from Padua to Otranto, replicating the Via Popilia and the coastal section of the Via Flaminia. Bulging inland, the SS16 constitutes Rimini's bypass road.

Provincial roads connect Rimini to towns in its hinterland, including Coriano and Montescudo. Two other state roads provide connections to Rimini's hinterland:

- The SS72 state road connects Rimini to the border with the Republic of San Marino at Dogana, continuing in Sammarinese territory as the San Marino Highway up to Borgo Maggiore, from which the San Marino cablecar system connects with the City of San Marino.
- The SS258 state road connects Rimini to Sansepolcro, in Tuscany, through the valley of the Marecchia.

The tolled A14 Adriatic motorway runs from Bologna to Taranto through Rimini, relieving the SS9 and SS16. Rimini has two exits on the A14: Rimini North, in the locality of San Vito, and Rimini Sud, nearer the city centre, close to where the SS72 meets the SS16. Both exits opened on 13 August 1966 as part of the Cesena–Rimini section. Rimini's municipal government supports a new A14 exit onto the SS9 near Santa Giustina to relieve arterial roads near Rimini Fiera; the junction is included in the regional mobility development plan.

=== Railway ===
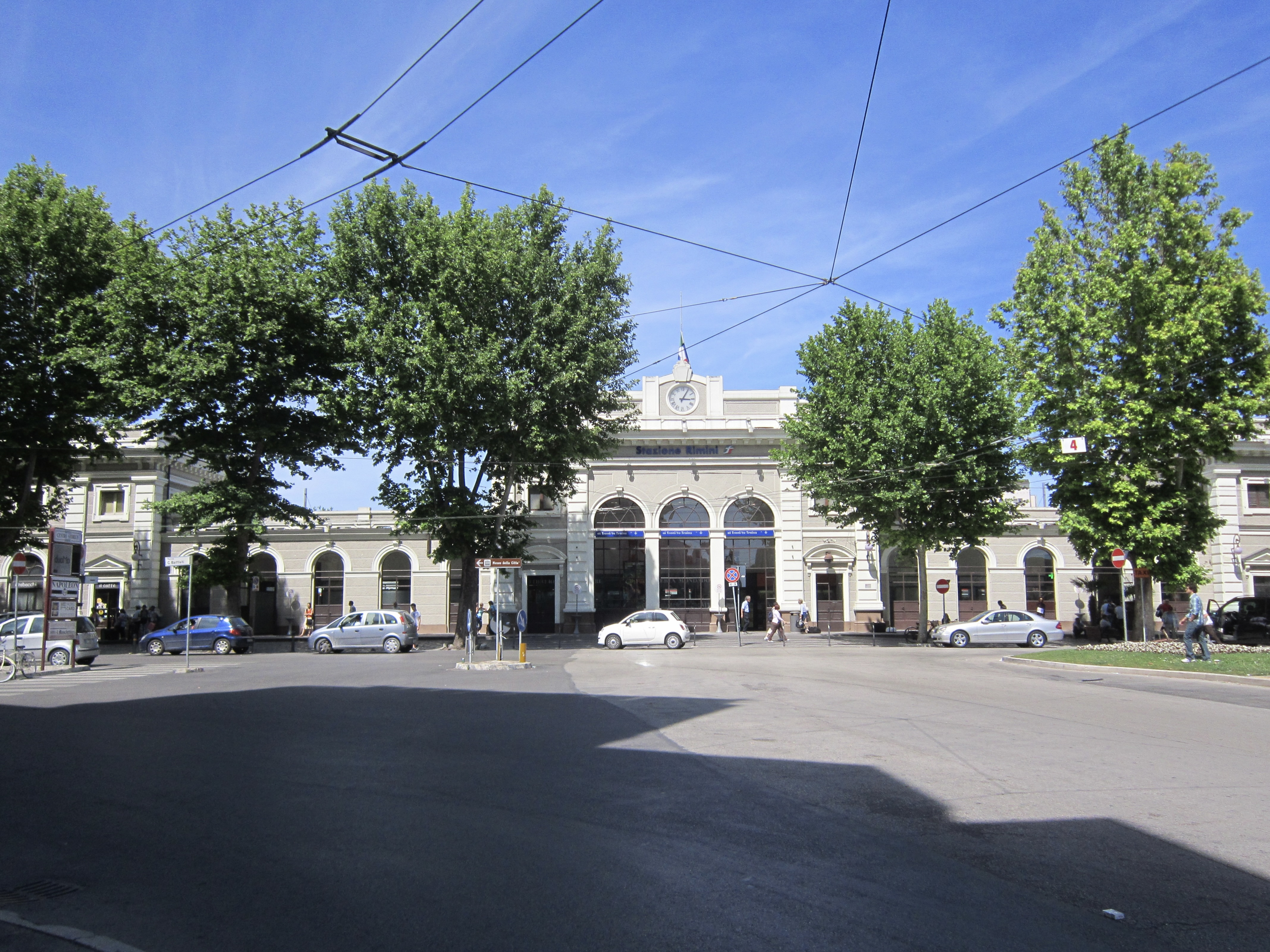
Rimini railway station in May 2011

Rimini railway station is at the midpoint of the Bologna–Ancona railway, and the terminus of the Ferrara–Rimini railway. Regional and national trains of all categories call at the station.

Rimini was formerly the terminus of two disused lines:

- Between 1916 and 1960, the Rimini–Novafeltria railway ran between Rimini Centrale, opposite the main railway station, and Novafeltria along the Marecchia valley, notably serving Verucchio and Talamello. The line included several stops in Rimini's territory.
- Between 1932 and 1944, the Rimini–San Marino railway connected Rimini to the City of San Marino through the Sammarinese towns of Dogana, Serravalle, Domagnano, and Borgo Maggiore. The line included a station and depot on Via Giovanni Pascoli, known as Rimini Marina. Both the Sammarinese and Italian governments have expressed interest in reopening the line.

Rimini has four minor railway stations that are served by regional trains: Torre Pedrera and Viserba on the Ferrara–Rimini railway; and Rimini Fiera and Rimini Miramare on the Bologna–Ancona railway.

=== Aviation ===
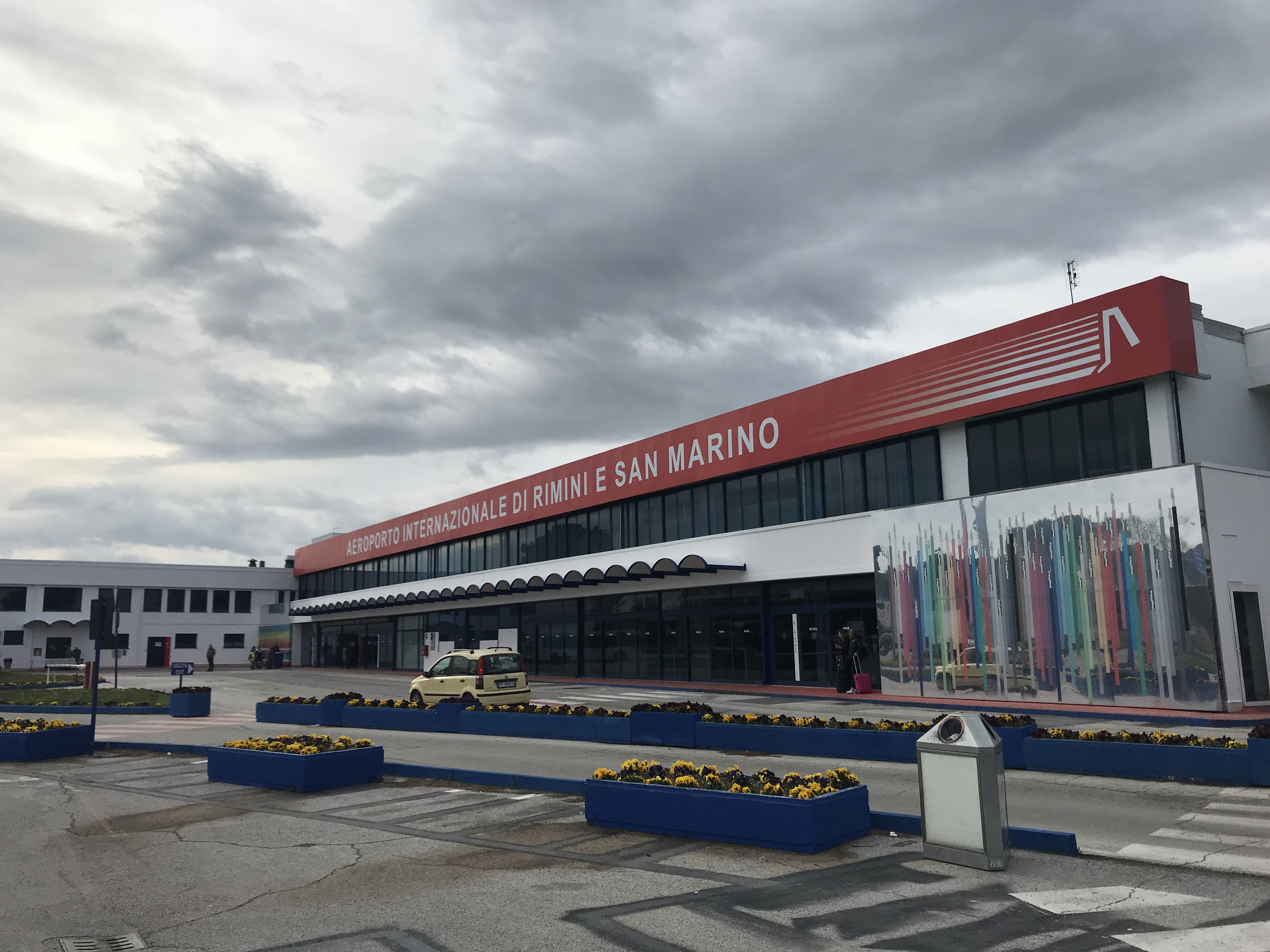
Fellini Airport in March 2018

The city is served by Rimini Fellini Airport, in the southern suburb of Miramare. The airport is a crucial nexus in the local economy, particularly for tourists visiting the riviera romagnola. It recorded 215,767 passengers in 2022, rendering it the second-busiest airport in Emilia-Romagna. The airport is mainly served by low-cost carriers and charter traffic.

The airport was built in 1929 as an aerodrome, on the site of the former Rimini-Riccione Defence Section of the army's Aeronautical Service. It ranked among Italy's busiest airports during the 1960s, supported by international tourists visiting Rimini's beaches. Its passenger use declined with the opening of the A14 tolled highway in 1966. Since the end of the Cold War, Fellini Airport has been specially popular among tourists from the countries of the former Soviet Union. Russian and Ukrainian passengers together represented 61% of Fellini Airport's passengers before the 2022 invasion, which was projected to lose the airport 300,000 passengers annually. Alongside its civilian history, the airport has a notable military history: it was the home of the 5th Aerobrigade of the Italian Air Force between 1956 and 2010, and during the Cold War, it was identified by the Warsaw Pact as a strategic target in the event of an all-out war, housing several thousand Italian and NATO soldiers and thirty B61 nuclear bombs. Helicopters belonging to the 7th Army Aviation Regiment "Vega" remain at the airport.

After Fellini Airport, the closest major airports are Luigi Ridolfi Airport in Forlì, Raffaello Sanzio Airport in Ancona, and Guglielmo Marconi Airport in Bologna. A coach service operated by Shuttle Italy Airport connects Rimini with Bologna Airport.

Between 1959 and 1969, a helicopter service flew between Rimini's port and a heliport next to Borgo Maggiore's cablecar terminus in San Marino. Operated by Compagnia Italiana Elicotteri, the service ran several times per day, using a fleet of four-seater Bell 47J Rangers and a three-seater Agusta-Bell AB-47G, which were serviced at Rimini's airport. In 1964, the line was extended to San Leo. Tickets would cost up to 12,500 lire, including the cablecar to the City of San Marino and a shuttle to the Leonine fortress. The service would take fifteen minutes to reach Borgo Maggiore and twenty-five minutes to reach San Leo.

=== Buses and coaches ===
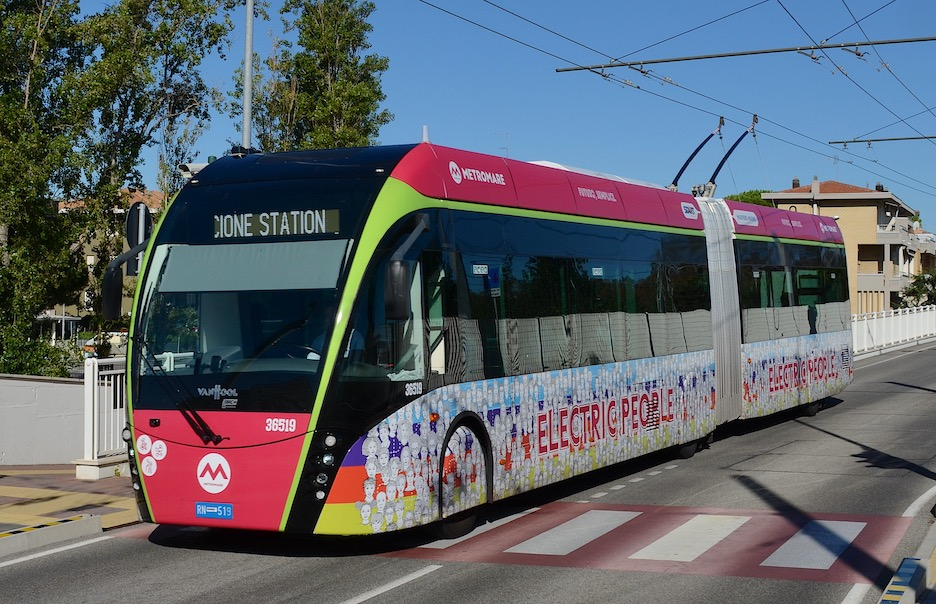
A Metromare trolleybus in 2022

Rimini and Riccione's combined bus network, operated by Start Romagna SpA, includes twenty-two suburban lines and twenty-six interurban lines. As well as serving the city's suburbs, the lines connect Rimini to towns and villages in the hinterland and to neighbouring comuni along the Adriatic coast.

Rimini's trolleybus system comprises two trolleybus lines that connect the city centres of Rimini and Riccione; both are run by Start Romagna SpA. Route 11 runs from Rimini's railway station to Riccione Terme along the principal seafront avenue, serving the touristic seafront. The line originated as a horse-drawn omibus service in 1844, running between Rimini and the present-day Parco Federico Fellini. It was converted to a horse-drawn tram in 1877, and electrified in 1921. Between 1921 and 1927, it was progressively extended southwards to reach Riccione, and converted to a trolleybus line in 1939.

The newer trolleybus route, Metromare, launched on 23 November 2019, provisionally using motorbuses because of a delay in the delivery of the trolleybus fleet. The 9.8-kilometre (6.1 mi) bus rapid transit line runs on a segregated track adjacent to the Bologna-Ancona railway between the stations of Rimini and Riccione. Intermediate stops serve the Fiabilandia amusement park in Rivazzurra, Miramare's railway station, and Federico Fellini International Airport. The trolleybuses entered service on the line on 28 October 2021. A 4.2-kilometre (2.6-mile) northern extension to Rimini Fiera has been approved, with construction starting in summer 2024.

Rimini is served by six FlixBus stops; its principal stop, on Via Annabile Fada, is served by international routes. Local companies, including Bonelli Bus, Autolinee Benedettini, and Adriabus, provide regular and seasonal coach services to other Italian cities, San Marino, and regional historic sites such as Urbino and Gradara.

== Education ==
Rimini is the seat of a campus of University of Bologna, attended by 5,800 students, which include bachelors and masters belonging to eight Faculties: Economics, Statistical Sciences, Pharmacy, Literature and Philosophy, Industrial Chemistry, Sport Sciences, Medicine and Surgery.

The city has public schools of all levels, including 13 nurseries, 12 kindergartens, 39 primary schools, 5 secondary schools and 11 high schools (4 Lyceums, 3 Technical Institutes, 3 Professional Institutes and an Institute of Musical Studies). The city's oldest lyceum, the Classical Lyceum "Giulio Cesare", founded in 1800, was attended by Amintore Galli, Giovanni Pascoli, and Federico Fellini.

== Utilities ==
HERA Group (Gruppo HERA), a multi-utility company based in Bologna, is responsible for the province of Rimini's gas, water, energy, and waste management.

Rimini has three ecological stations (stazioni ecologiche) for waste sorting: Rimini Viserba, between the coastline and Italia in Miniatura; Rimini Via Nataloni, west of the city centre; and Rimini Via Macanno, south of Le Befane shopping centre.

Rimini is served by the wastewater treatment plant of Rimini-Santa Giustina, which serves eleven municipalities and the Republic of San Marino. The plant has a water flow rate of 23,281,000 cubic metres (822,200,000 cubic feet), and capable of treating the equivalent of 560,000 inhabitants in the summer and 370,000 inhabitants the winter. The purification plant was inaugurated on 31 May 1972, and doubled in capacity between 2013 and 2015, to become Europe's largest purifier.

In 2013, the municipal government, HERA, and Romagna Acque instituted an eleven-year, 154-million-euro Optimised Bathing Protection Plan (Piano di Salvaguardia della Balneazione Ottimizzato). The plan sought to reduce sewage discharges into the sea after rainfall or thunderstorms, which would lead to temporary bathing bans along Rimini's coastline, hurting its tourist economy. A rainwater collection tank, with a 14,000-cubic-metre (490,000-cubic-foot) capacity, and a lamination tank, with a 25,000-cubic-metre (880,000-cubic-foot) capacity, was installed under Piazzale Kennedy. As part of the plan, Rimini's sewage system was remodelled between 2014 and 2020.

== Sport ==
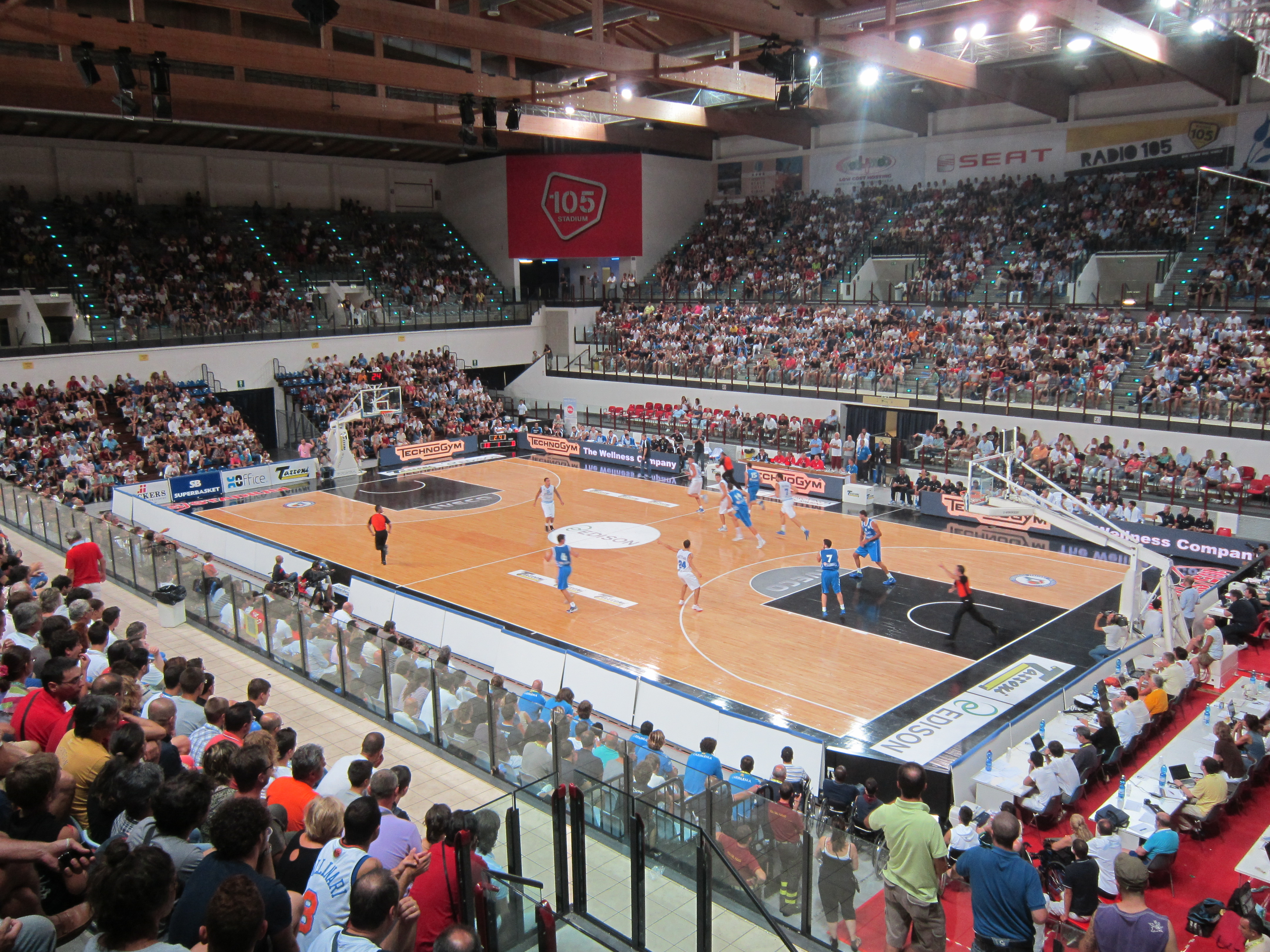
A basketball game at 105 Stadium Arena

The main football team of the city is Rimini Calcio. It played for nine years (between 1976 and 2009) in Serie B, the second-highest division in the Italian football league system. Its better positioning was the fifth place of the 2006–07 season (when Rimini was also undefeated in both games against Juventus).

Rimini has also a notable basketball team, the Basket Rimini Crabs, which played for several years in Serie A and two times in the European Korać Cup. About baseball, Rimini Baseball Club won 12 national championships and it was also European champion three times.

Every Easter weekend, Rimini hosts Paganello, a beach ultimate tournament. First held in 1991, the event takes place over a 500-metre (1,600 ft) stretch of beach, between beaches 39 and 47. In 2023, the competition included 136 teams and 1,600 athletes. The tournament runs between Maundy Thursday and Easter Monday, and is accompanied by cultural shows along Rimini's beach. There are two competitions: a Frisbee tournament, and the Freestyle, which is more acrobatic.

== Notable people ==
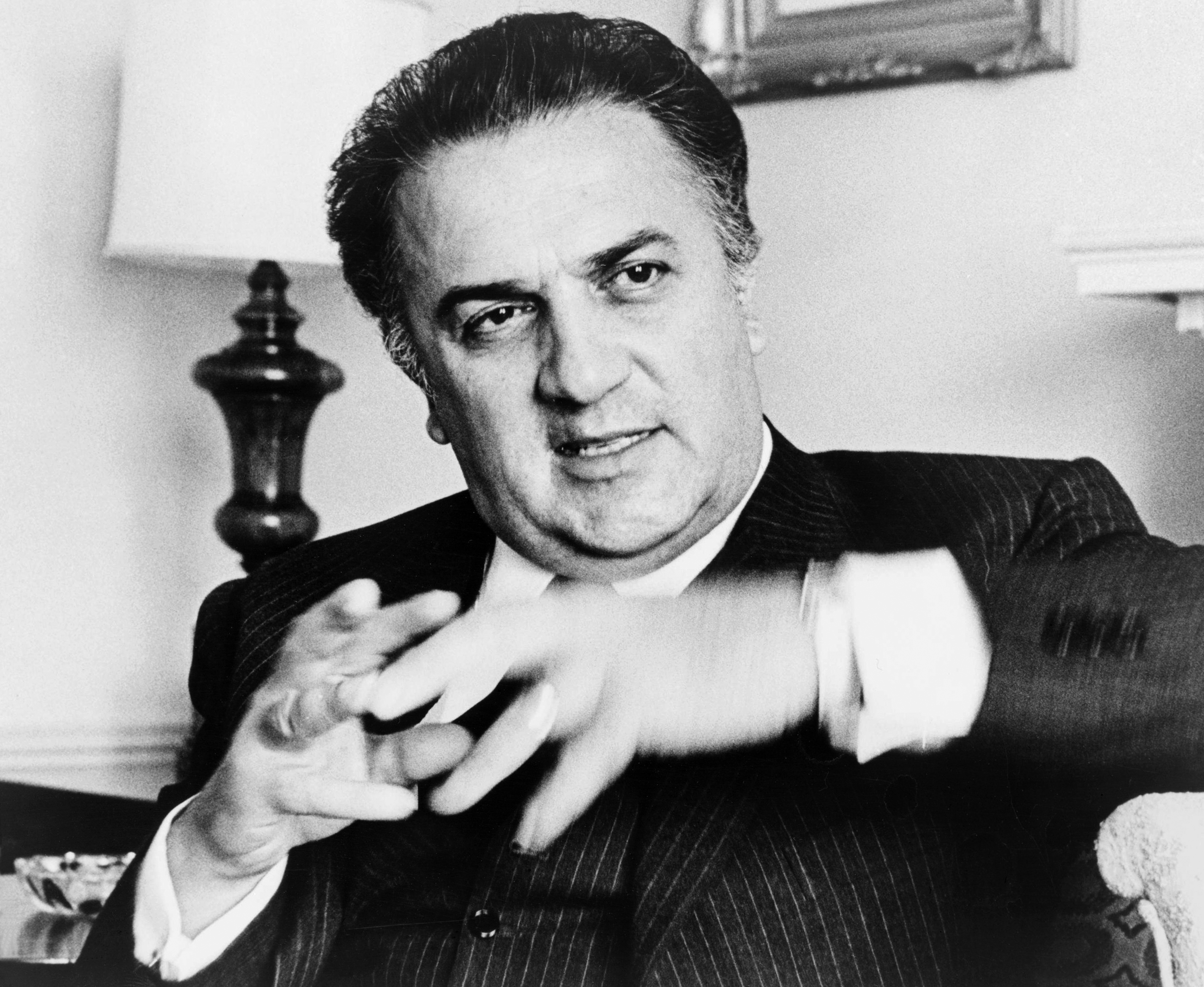
Federico Fellini received five Oscars.

- Ancient Bards (founded 2006), symphonic metal band
- Enea Bastianini (born 1997), motorcycle racer
- Marco Battagli (died 1370/76), historian
- Samuele Bersani (born 1970), singer-songwriter
- Marco Bezzecchi (born 1998), motorcycle racer
- Mario Bianchelli (1660–1730), composer and guitar virtuoso
- Pier Paolo Bianchi (born 1952), Grand Prix motorcycle road racer
- Matteo Brighi (born 1981), football player
- Marco Carnesecchi (born 2000), professional footballer who plays as a goalkeeper for Serie A club Atalanta.
- Claudio Maria Celli (born 1941), titular archbishop
- Gregorio Celli (1225–1343), Roman Catholic priest, professed member of the Order of Saint Augustine, beatified by Pope Clement XIV on 6 September 1769
- Roberto Paci Dalò (born 1962), composer, director and visual artist
- Patrizia Deitos (born 1975), supermodel and singer
- Victoria de Stefano (1940–2023), novelist, essayist, philosopher, and educator
- Mattia Drudi (born 1998), racing driver
- Federico Fellini (1920–1993), film director
- Amintore Galli (1845–1919), music publisher, academic, and composer, studied, lived in retirement, and died in Rimini
- Alberto Marvelli (1918–1946), engineer, president of Azione Cattolica
- Carlotta Montanari (born 1981), actress and former TV host
- Carlton Myers (born 1971), basketball player
- Aldo Oviglio (1873–1942), first Minister of Justice of the Mussolini government, was born and raised in Rimini
- Elio Pagliarani (1927–2012), poet and literary critic
- Renzo Pasolini (1938–1973), Grand Prix motorcycle road racer
- Alessandra Perilli (born 1988), shooter and first Olympic medalist for San Marino
- Hugo Pratt (1927–1995), comic book creator
- Giuliano da Rimini (c. 1307 – c. 1324), painter
- Michael Ruben Rinaldi (born 1995), motorcycle racer
- Carla Ronci (1936–1970), Venerable of the Catholic Church, was born, lived, and died in Rimini
- Delio Rossi (born 1960), football manager
- Loris Stecca (born 1960), former world champion boxer
- Siegfried Stohr (born 1952), racing driver
- Massimo Tamburini (1943–2014), motorcycle designer
- Giovanni Urbinati (born 1946), ceramist and sculptor
- Roberto Valturio (1405–1475), engineer and writer
- Renato Zangheri (1925–2015), deputy and Mayor of Bologna, was born and raised in Rimini

== International relations ==
=== Twin towns – sister cities ===
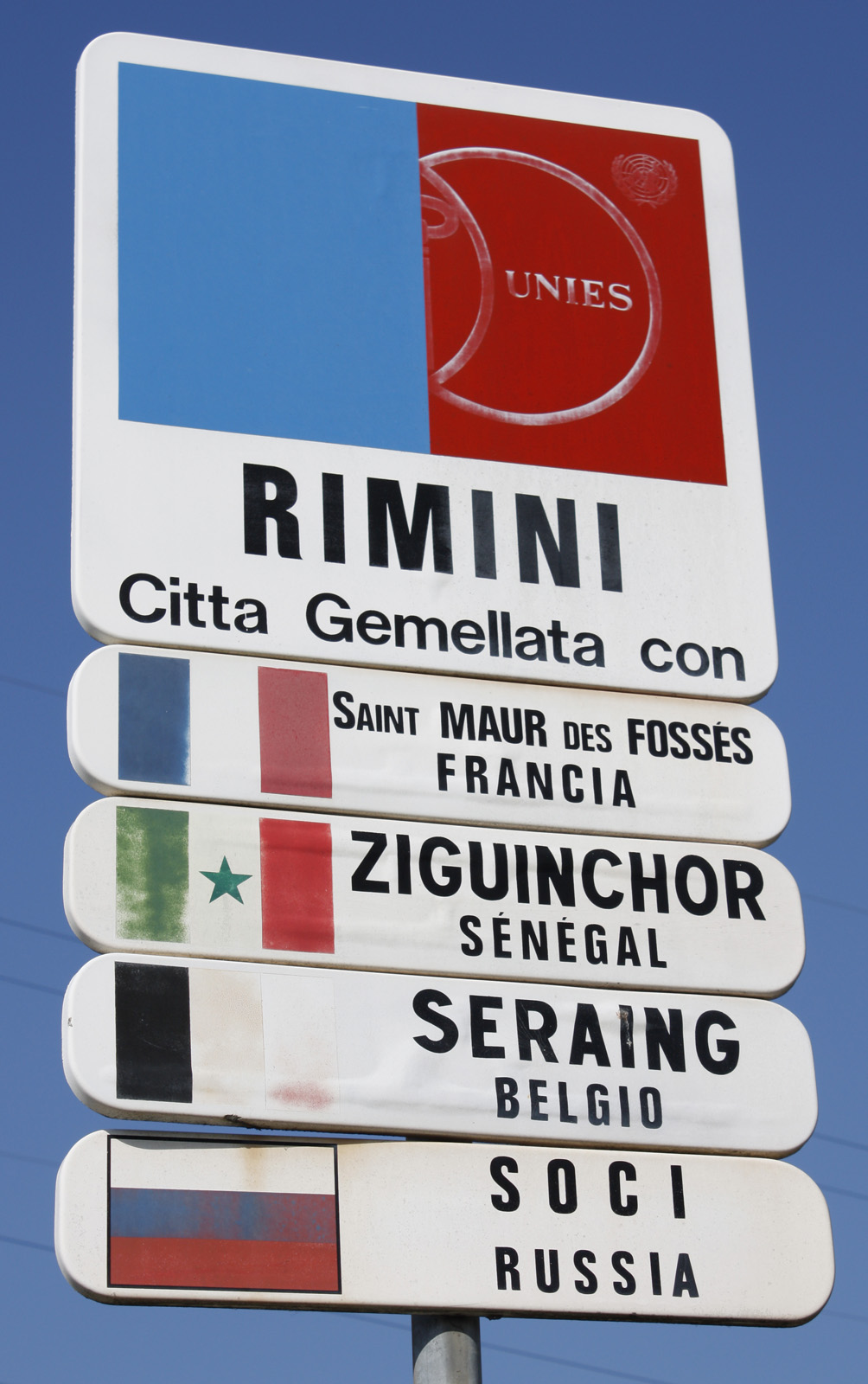
Rimini's twin towns and sister cities

Rimini is twinned with:

- (United States) Fort Lauderdale, U.S.
- Saint-Maur-des-Fossés, France
- Seraing, Belgium
- Sochi, Russia
- Yangzhou, China
- Ziguinchor, Senegal

Its twinning with Saint-Maur-des-Fossés was inaugurated on 5 June 1972, and its twinning with Ziguinchor on 8 June 1974.

== See also ==
- Fogheraccia – an annual public bonfire lit on the evening of 18 March, the vigil of Saint Joseph's Day, especially in Rimini

== Bibliography ==
- Graziosi Ripa, Anna (1980). Per la storia del Museo Archeologico riminese, in: Analisi di Rimini antica. Storia e archeologia per un museo. Rimini: Comune di Rimini.

== Sources and external links ==
- Province of Rimini
- Rimini Comune (Town Council)
- Official Tourist Information site of Rimini (Town Council)
- Rimini
- Rimini Travel Guide in Dutch
