= 1916 Rimini earthquakes =

Earthquakes in Rimini, Italy

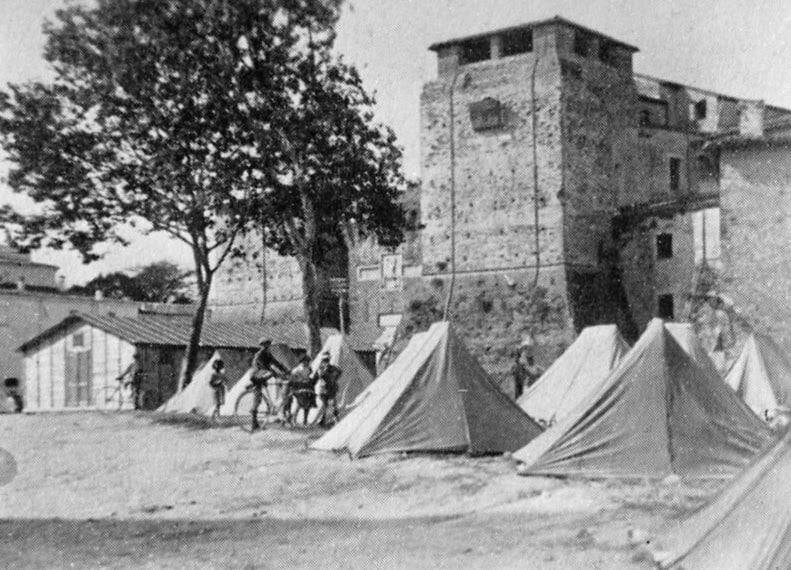
- Tents in front of Castel Sismondo after an earthquake

- Location within Italy
- ISC event: 913838
- Local date: 17 May 1916 (first); 16 August 1916 (second)
- Local time: 13:50 CEST (first); 09:06 CEST (second)
- Magnitude: M_{w} 5.82 (first); M_{w} 5.82 (second)
- Epicenter: 44.019°N 12.737°E
- Areas affected: Romagna, Kingdom of Italy (Rimini, Riccione, and hinterland); Marche, Kingdom of Italy (Pesaro, Fano, and hinterland); Republic of San Marino
- Aftershocks: M_{w} 4.82 (16 June 1916); M_{w} 4.69 (16 August 1916); M_{w} 5.3 (16 August 1916)

In 1916, two earthquakes of magnitude 5.82 M_{w} occurred near the border between the regions of Romagna and the Marche in the Kingdom of Italy: at 13:50 CEST on 17 May, and at 09:06 CEST on 16 August.

While the earthquakes caused few fatalities, the 17 May earthquake damaged and the 16 August earthquake destroyed many buildings in the coastal settlements of Rimini, Riccione, and Pesaro, and their hinterlands. 615 buildings in Rimini were demolished after the earthquakes, while 80% of Riccione was razed. Among the lost historic buildings were Riccione's medieval Church of San Lorenzo in Strada and its first marine hospice. Some houses also collapsed in the Republic of San Marino. With the 16 August earthquake occurring at the height of the summer touristic season, the 1916 earthquakes considerably hurt the local coastal economies, already depressed by the First World War.

The area around Rimini had suffered earthquakes in 1672, 1786, and 1875. Their frequency had mistakenly led people to expect strong earthquakes only once a century. The 1916 earthquakes are the most recent significant earthquakes to have struck Rimini and its environs. Antiseismic building regulations enforced in 1927 were suspended under Fascist Italy to encourage touristic development; they were reinstated in 1984, after much of the coastline had been developed.

== Earthquakes and shocks ==
=== 17 May earthquake ===
At 13:50 on 17 May 1916, an earthquake of magnitude 5.82 M_{w} was recorded at 44.119°N 12.748°E, 14 kilometres (8.7 miles) from the coast of Bellariva, a southern frazione of Rimini, in the Adriatic Sea. The earthquake was felt in Bologna; the tremor caused a clocktower in Medicina to chime once.

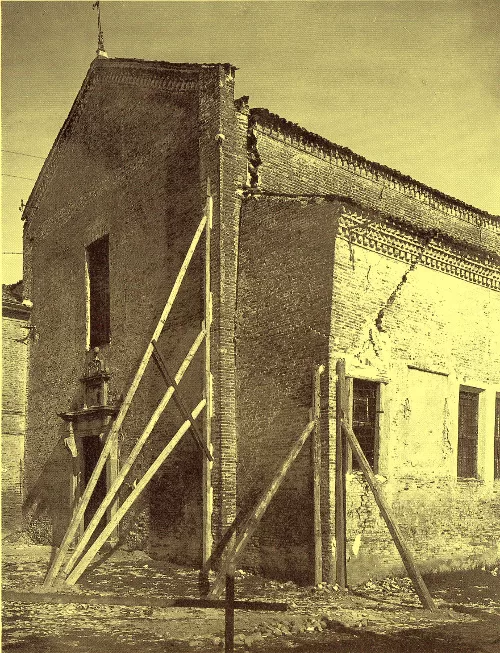
Rimini's Church of San Bartolomeo, next to the Arch of Augustus, following the 17 May earthquake

The earthquake damaged over 1,000 buildings in Rimini. Rimini's municipal hall was among the most damaged: several walls had shifted, ceilings and partition walls collapsed, and many artworks were damaged or broken. The hall's total damages were estimated at 60,000 lire. The Victor Emmanuel II Theatre featured large cracks and loose columns. Several buildings were damaged on Via Gambalunga, including the Palazzo Gambalunga. Also damaged were the modern areas of the Tempio Malatestiano, and most of the city's churches, including San Giovanni Battista, Colonnella, and San Bernardino. The ceiling of the Church of San Bartolomeo was largely ruined. The districts of Celle and Rione Montecavallo were particularly damaged. In Riccione, the Ceccarini Hospital and kindergarten were damaged. Several houses collapsed or suffered damage in Cattolica, while five houses became uninhabitable in Gabicce Mare. In the Republic of San Marino, two houses were seriously damaged in the castello of Serravalle, with damages also reported in Cà Giannino and Cacciavello.

No fatalities were reported in Rimini, but ten people were injured. Though most of the injuries were light, a carabiniere suffered a broken leg. Further injuries were reported in other municipalities, including Cattolica. Many people slept outdoors; families made homeless were welcomed to sleep in Castel Sismondo or its adjoining piazza.

Aftershocks were felt at approximately 11:00 on 17 May, and at 06:30 and 09:15 on 18 May. Numerous belltowers and chimneys were repaired or demolished after the earthquake, including a 38-metre (125-foot) chimney of Rimini's Fabbri furnace. The last 8 metres (26 feet) of the chimney had been damaged; other chimneys at the plant also showed signs of damage.

=== 16 June earthquake ===
At 05:27 on 16 June, an earthquake of magnitude 4.82 M_{w}was recorded at 44.089°N 12.674°E, 7 kilometres (4.3 miles) from the coast of Bellariva. The shock further weakened buildings damaged in the 17 May earthquake, including in Rimini, Riccione, Cattolica, Santarcangelo di Romagna, Gabicce Mare, Savignano, San Mauro, Gatteo, Pesaro, and Fano.

=== 15 August foreshocks ===
The day before the 16 August earthquake was Ferragosto and the height of Rimini's touristic season. Fifty tremors were felt throughout the day. Il Resto del Carlino reported:

Throughout the day of Tuesday 15th on the beach from Bellaria to Pesaro, there was a succession of earthquake tremors with a significant increase in intensity. Nonetheless, Rimini – subjected to far greater torments – did not cease from its usual occupations, already accustomed by several months to repeated telluric movements of higher or lower intensity: on the beach, the usual life of joyful animation continued.

— Il Resto del Carlino, 18 August 1916

L'Avvenire d'Italia reported:

Around 11 o'clock at night, the wrath of the underground subsided [...] but the people did not dare to dare to sleep in the houses and villas and camped as best they could, on mattresses thrown where there was a little shelter from the wind and the dew, or took refuge more comfortably in the seaside huts. Those who had come for a few days, taking advantage of the August holiday, hastily repacked their bags and fled to Bologna.

— L'Avvenire d'Italia, 18 August 1916

=== 16 August earthquake ===
At 09:06 on 16 August, an earthquake of magnitude 5.82 M_{w} was recorded at 44.019°N 12.737°E, 5 kilometres (3.1 miles) from the coast of Misano. The earthquake was felt across a long stretch of Italy's Adriatic coast, from Veneto to Abruzzo. It was also felt in Milan and Genoa. It caused minor tsunamis, opened ground fissures, and clouded the waters of various springs.

In Riccione, fissures erupted slime and boiling water, leading locals to believe erroneously that the earthquake was caused by the eruption of an underwater volcano. In the popular press, experts responded that the phenomenon was explained by liquefaction, and suggested that the observed leakages were the result of a ruptured pipe. Two aftershocks followed the earthquake:

- At 10:33 on 16 August, an earthquake of magnitude 4.69 M_{w}was recorded at 43.800°N 12.800°E, south of Monteciccardo, Marche.
- At 11:44 on 16 August, an earthquake of magnitude 5.3 M_{w} was recorded at 44.167°N 12.917°E, 25 kilometres (16 miles) from the coast of Gabicce Mare.

== Damages ==
=== Fatalities ===
In Rimini, four victims died in the 16 August earthquake, and at least sixty people were injured. Cattolica and Pesaro recorded one fatality each. There were no fatalities in Riccione, but fifteen injured. Three people were injured in Morciano di Romagna. The low fatalities were attributed to the 17 May earthquake and 15 August foreshocks, and the time of the earthquake: many farmers were working in the fields, while townspeople were at Rimini's Wednesday morning market.

=== Buildings ===
==== Romagna ====
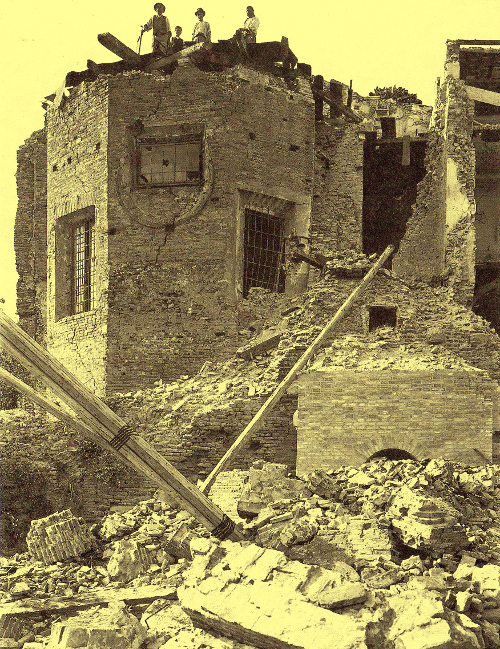
Rimini's Church of San Bartolomeo, photographed earlier after the 17 May earthquake, is photographed here in ruins after the 16 August earthquake.

Following the earthquakes, Rimini's municipal government recorded 615 buildings demolished, 229 propped up, and 2,112 repaired. The Corriere Riminese reported:

It can be stated that there is no building in the city that has not suffered, except those built in the new neighbourhoods, which remained intact, and so also all the numerous villas and elegant buildings that extend along our marina.

— Corriere Riminese, 27 August 1916

Rimini's city centre was considered unsafe by the number of unstable structures, and many roads were guarded by soldiers with instructions not to allow pedestrians through. Several merlons of the Arch of Augustus fell, as they also had after the 17 May earthquake. In September 1921, it was estimated that the restoration work on Rimini's municipal hall, whose redesign was entrusted to architect Gaspare Rastelli, amounted to 630,000 lire. Among the earthquakes' few positives, they caused eighteenth-century plaster in the apse of the Church of Sant'Agostino to collapse, revealing forgotten fourteenth-century frescos.

80% of Riccione was razed. Among the destroyed buildings were the ancient Church of San Lorenzo in Strada and the Ceccarini kindergarten, which were rebuilt, and the Amanti-Martinelli Marine Hospice, which was replaced with the Grand Hotel. Damaged buildings included the Ceccarini Hospital, the Hotel des Bains, the Villa Graziani, the Villa Pullè, and the Fontanelle and Trinità towers. Engineers noted that the Hotel des Bains had insufficiently thick walls for its height, and that buildings in the Fontanelle area had been shoddily built using rounded pebbles bound with low-quality lime.

Similar damage was noted in settlements along the coast, including Cattolica. In the hinterland, the parish of San Salvatore, near Coriano, was among the most affected. Damage was reported as far inland as Morciano, where eight or nine houses collapsed. In Saludecio, the hamlets of San Rocco and Monte Petrino were almost entirely rebuilt. The tower of Coriano's Malatesta castle was badly damaged, while the castle in Besanigo completely collapsed, alongside twenty houses.

==== Marche ====
Pesaro's historic centre was abandoned, leaving 14,000 displaced people crowded into 2,000 tents. The ancient parish church of Sant'Andrea Apostolo in Fiorenzuola di Focara collapsed; it was rebuilt on a different hill. Two spires of Fano Cathedral collapsed. Elsewhere in the city, a large stucco angel fell in the Church of Sant'Agostino, and part of the belltower wall of the Church of Santa Maria del Gonfalone collapsed. Part of a wall of the Church of San Paterniano collapsed.

In Novilara, 31 houses were damaged, and five declared uninhabitable. In Candelara, 13 houses were damaged, and two declared uninhabitable. In Mombaroccio, 38 houses were damaged and four declared uninhabitable. In Saltara, thirty houses were rendered uninhabitable, and fifty were slightly damaged. In Cartoceto, 33 houses were damaged, and six declared uninhabitable. In Lucrezia, most of the town's 140 houses were slightly damaged and 4% rendered uninhabitable. In Serrungarina, 28 houses were damaged, and five declared uninhabitable. In Isola del Piano, ten houses were damaged.

==== San Marino ====
In the Republic of San Marino, several houses collapsed in Serravalle.

== Consequences and responses ==
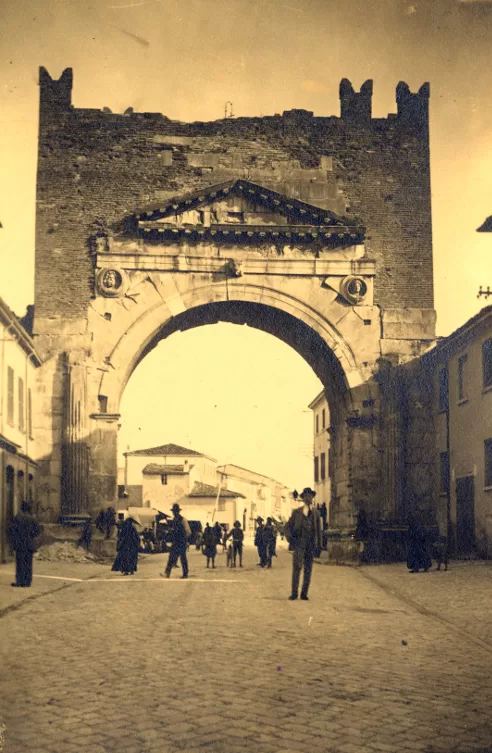
Rimini's Arch of Augustus after the earthquakes, with several merlons fallen

=== Humanitarian support ===
On the morning of 17 August, inspectors arrived overnight from Rome toured Rimini, ordering the demolition or repair of houses and the dispatch, by special train, of materials from dismantled military barracks that could be resited in the city. The authorities of the Province of Forlì stayed in Rimini over the coming days, establishing special commissions in Riccione, Coriano, Misano, San Clemente, and Mondaino. Minister Ubaldo Comandini arrived in Rimini on 18 August.

4,174 people were displaced between Rimini and Riccione. Several families took residence in empty seaside villas. The municipal engineers housed people in bathing huts, and decided to build barracks near damaged homes rather than in a large, central camp. Il Resto del Carlino reported on 19 August that pavilions with a capacity for 70 people each were built, alongside 35 wooden barracks, 6 timber wagons, and over 2,000 tents. 882 shelters were granted, and many residents began to repair their own homes. As people moved to less-affected localities, malaria spread.

On 8 May 1917, Rimini's municipal government awarded a souvenir medal to fire brigade teams for their service.

=== Central government response ===
Victor Emmanuel III provided a donation of 100,000 lire to install makeshift kitchens. These kitchens were popular in Romagna, whereas the Marche preferred distributing bread and grains.

On 27 August 1916, the Italian government provided 10 million lire for the area's reconstruction, and provided a month's extension for any bills of exchange due between 12 August and 5 September payable by debtors residing in the areas of Rimini and Pesaro. On 5 September 1916, the central government established a special civil engineering corps office in Rimini to oversee technical services related to the demolition and reconstruction of buildings in affected municipalities.

On 5 November 1916, the Italian government legislated a package of financial support for residents in affected municipalities who had received neither free repairs nor permanent shelters:

- Individuals and companies with a taxable income less than 5,000 lire were eligible for subsidised loans, with the state contributing 50% of the semi-annual payments, including 4.5% interest and amortisation. Alternatively, they could receive a direct contribution of either 52% of the semi-annual payments of a 20-year loan at 4.5% interest, or 50% of the capital up to 5,000 lire for completed works.
- Those with a taxable income exceeding 5,000 lire could apply for subsidised 20-year loans at 4.5% interest, with the state covering half of the total interest. They could otherwise opt for a direct contribution equal to 52% of the total interest of a similar loan, for completed works.
- The state offered an additional tenth of the contribution to joint-stock and cooperative companies undertaking repair or construction works. Tax exemptions and reductions were granted to local banks and affected parties. Reconstructed or repaired buildings were exempt from property tax for 15 years form the date that they became usable.

The government also suspended rules regarding road widths.

=== Local economy ===
The earthquakes worsened the living conditions of local people, already depressed by the First World War. Unemployment increased considerably in the affected areas.

The 16 August earthquake sparked an exodus away from affected areas at the height of their touristic season. On 19 August 1916, Il Resto del Carlino reported that tourists were leaving their bags at Riccione railway station in the hope that they could shorten their wait to board a train leaving the town. Shops were closed for several days in Fano as people fled the city, with Fano railway station also overwhelmed with people attempting to leave.

=== Designation as seismic area ===
In 1927, as a result of the 1916 earthquakes, Rimini and its surrounding municipalities were classified as seismic areas. In 1938, the podestà of the municipal government requested that the city be exempted from antiseismic building regulations; between 27 July 1938 and 7 August 1941, municipalities in the areas of Rimini, Riccione, and Pesaro were removed from the list of seismic areas, in order to facilitate the development of seaside resorts. Antiseismic building regulations returned only in 1984 following the Irpinia earthquake, after much of the coastline had already been developed by mass tourism. 70% of Rimini's current buildings are believed to have been built without antiseismic building regulations.
