= Museo della Città, Rimini =

Italian civic museum

City Museum of Rimini
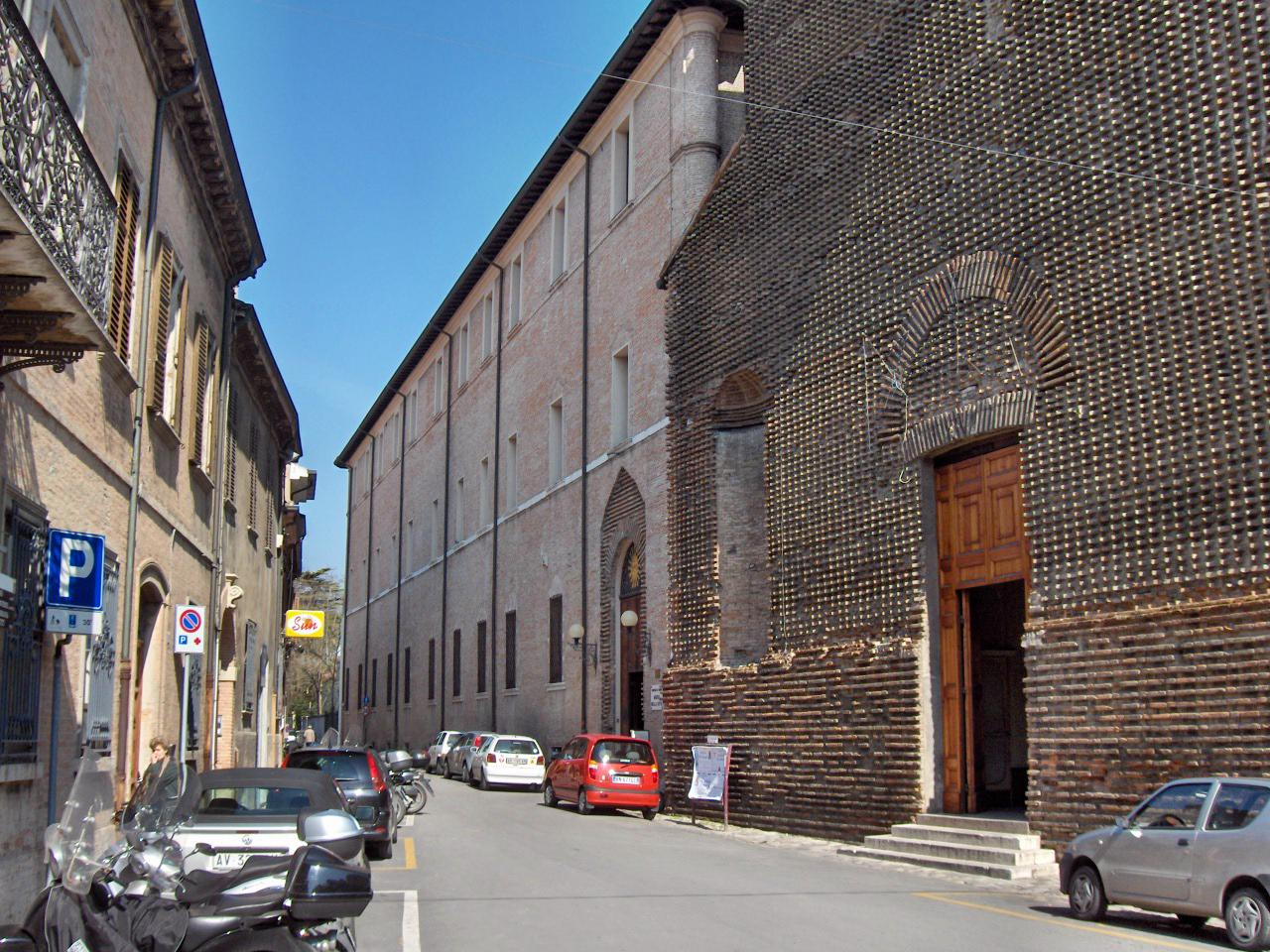
- Location: Rimini, Italy
- Coordinates: 44°03′45″N 12°34′01″E
- Type: archaeology museum art museum historic house museum museum natural history museum ethnographic museum museum of a public entity
- Collection size: 2,500 item, 2,500 item
- Area: 20,000 m^{2} (220,000 sq ft)
- Visitors: 18,808 (2020), 125,187 (2019), 155,281 (2018), 21,303 (2021), 38,285 (2022)
- Website: www.museicomunalirimini.it/it/musei/museo-della-citta-luigi-tonini
- Location of Museo della Città, Rimini

The Museo della Città is the civic museum located in the former Jesuit convent on Via Luigi Tonini #1 of the city of Rimini, in the region of Emilia-Romagna, Italy. It rises adjacent to Chiesa del Suffragio, and a modern structure (Complesso Archeologico della Domus del Chirurgo in piazza Ferrari) built to enclose the ruins of an ancient Roman Domus, or house.

== History ==
The museum is mainly located in the building, designed by Alfonso Torreggiani as the Seminary and Convent of the Jesuits. Construction took place from 1746 to 1755. After the suppression of the order, the site was transferred to the Dominicans and then in 1797 became a civic hospital. The structure was heavily damaged by the bombardment during the second world war. The hospital was closed in 1977. Since 1990, it has become the Civic museum, designed by Pier Luigi Foschi, and dedicated to Luigi Tonini, who founded the first civic museum in Rimini.

== Collections ==
The courtyard of the cloister houses a Roman Lapidarium, dedicated to Professor Giancarlo Susini, initially curated in 1981, and displaying inscriptions from the 1st to 4th-centuries. In 2015, the museum garden was dedicated to the archeologist Khaled al–Asaad, who was murdered at the site of Palmyra in Syria. The basement has another archeologic display including instruments from the nearby Domus del Chirurgo and mosaics discovered in the Palazzo Diotallevi.

The first floor of the museum has a permanent display of works by the local fashion illustrator René Gruau and a display of the Libro dei sogni (Book of Dreams) by Federico Fellini. Spanning the first and main floor is located the Pinacoteca or painting gallery of Rimini, containing works from the 11th to the 20th centuries, including work a large Renaissance fresco of The Last Judgement attributed to Giovanni da Rimini and a Last Supper attributed to Benedetto Coda. Many of the paintings belong to the Fondazione Cassa di Risparmio di Rimini. Among the collection are:

- St John the Baptist and Madonna by Giovanni Francesco da Rimini (painted as arms of a Cross)
- Holy Conversation by Lattanzio da Rimini
- Veronica and the Veil by Francesco Zaganelli
- Holy Bishop by Girolamo Marchesi da Cotignola
- Pieta by Domenico Ghirlandaio
- Annunciation and Christ before Pilate by Jan Baegert
- Deposition by Pomponio Amalteo
- Walk to Calvary by Nicolò Frangipane
- Madonna and Child with Saints and Angels and Marriage of the Virgin by Benedetto and Bartolomeo Coda (and studio) commissioned by the Company of the Fornai of the Cathedral of Santa Colomba.
- History of Publius Cornelius Scipio during Punic War (7 of original 11 panels) by Marco Marchetti, a follower of Vasari, painted for the Sala Nobile of the Palazzo Marcheselli-Lettimi:
  - Conquest of Carthage
  - Punishment of Head Rebels
  - Defeat of Hasdrubal
  - Fire of Orangis (Jaén)
  - Defeat of Hanno
  - Conferring crown to Valiant Soldiers
- Continence of Scipio
- Vocation of St Matthew, St Anthony Abbot with two Saints, St Peter, St Francis, Portrait of Young Priest and Cleopatra by Guido Cagnacci
- David and Goliath, Moses and the Bronze Serpent, Holy Bishop, and St John Evangelist by Giovanni Francesco Nagli (il Centino, deriving from the former Oratory of Santa Maria in Acumine, suppressed in 1798
- Jewish Passover and David plays Harp before Saul by Eberhard Keilhau, also from the Oratory of Santa Maria in Acumine
- Paintings by Carlo Leoni (painter) and Giovanni Laurentini detto l'Arrigoni.
- St Jerome by Guercino from the Oratory of the Confraternity of St Jerome
- St Antonio da Padova by Guercino and originating from church of San Francesco di Paola, Paolotti; commissioned by the local merchant Francesco Manganoni
- St Joseph and Child Jesus copy of Guido Reni work
- St James in Glory by Simone Cantarini
- Genre scene with Animals and Women and an Anatra e bacile by Jacob van De Kerkhoven
- Still Life with Marine Produce by frate Nicola Levoli
- Still Life with Harvest and Game by Rivalta
- Altarpiece of San Giuliano by Paolo Veronese
- Scenes of the Apocalypse by Francesco Maffei
- Temptation of the Philosopher by Giovan Battista Langetti
- Adoration of the Shepherds attributed to unknown 17th-century Neapolitan Master
- Portrait of Giovanni Bianchi by Ligorio Donati
- Portrait of Aurelio Bertola by Pietro Santi
- Paintings by Giovan Battista Costa and Giuseppe Soleri Brancaleoni
- Bridge of Tiberius by Richard Wilson
- Venus and Adonis by Marco Capizucchi
- Paolo e Francesca by Clemente Alberi
- Sculpture by Romeo Pazzini
- Arch of Augustus under snow, Il letto del Marecchia, Landscape of San Marino, View of Athens from Piraeus, View of Cagliari, Seascape with Greek Port by Guglielmo Bilancioni
- Portraits and Riminese Doctors by Francesco Brici

The nearby archeology museum Domus del Chirurgo was inaugurated in 2007. During work in the Piazza Ferrari, ruins of a second century CE house were uncovered with remains of mosaics and frescoes. Included in the findings were over 150 ancient Roman surgical instruments. The glass structure allows visitors to view continuing excavations.
