= Nagli =

Nagli is a surname. Notable people with the surname include:

- Carlo Antonio Nagli (1680–1756), Italian composer
- Giovanni Francesco Nagli (1615–1675), Italian painter
