= Rimini Lighthouse =

Rimini
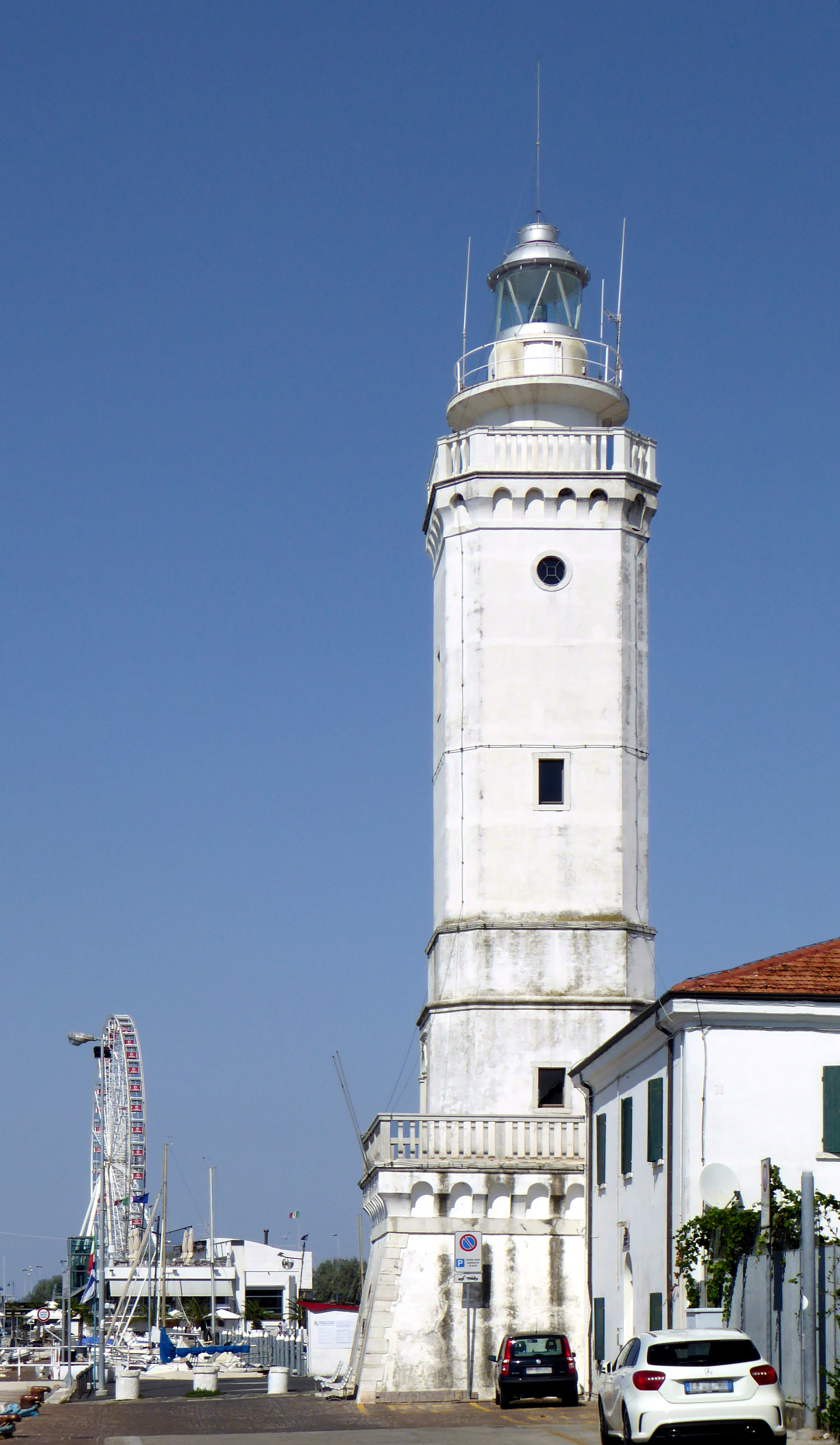
- Rimini Lighthouse
- Location: Rimini; Emilia-Romagna; Italy
- Coordinates: 44°04′27″N 12°34′26″E

Tower
- Constructed: 1733 (first); 1862 (second)
- Foundation: 1-storey masonry building
- Construction: masonry tower
- Automated: yes
- Height: 25 metres (82 ft)
- Shape: quadrangular tower with balcony and lantern attached to a 2-storey keeper's house
- Markings: white tower, grey metallic lantern dome
- Power source: mains electricity
- Operator: Marina Militare
- Heritage: Italian national heritage

Light
- First lit: 1946 (current)
- Deactivated: 1862 (first); 1945 (second)
- Focal height: 27 metres (89 ft)
- Lens: Type OF; Focal length: 187.5 mm
- Intensity: main: AL 1000 W reserve: LABI 100 W
- Range: main: 15 nautical miles (28 km; 17 mi) reserve: 11 nautical miles (20 km; 13 mi)
- Characteristic: Fl (3) W 12s.
- Italy no.: 4005 E.F.

Rimini Lighthouse (Italian: Faro di Rimini) is an active lighthouse located on the east side of the channel harbour of Rimini, Emilia-Romagna on the Adriatic Sea.

== History ==
The first lighthouse was designed by the architect Luigi Vanvitelli in 1733, on the will of Pope Clement XII, but the tower was then completed in 1745 by Giovanni Francesco Buonamici. In 1911 the lighthouse management turned to the Regia Marina that raised the tower of 9 metres (30 ft) and electrified the lantern. Partially destroyed during the bombardments of World War II, the lighthouse was rebuilt in 1946.

== Description ==
The current lighthouse consists of a tower, 25 feet (7.6 m) high, with balcony and lantern, attached to the white keeper's house. The lantern, painted in white and the dome in grey metallic, is positioned at 27 metres (89 ft) above sea level and emits three white flashes in a 12 seconds period, visible up to a distance of 15 nautical miles (28 km; 17 mi). The lighthouse is completely automated and operated by the Marina Militare with the identification code number 4005 E.F.

== See also ==
- List of lighthouses in Italy
- Rimini
