= Bernardino Zaganelli =

Italian painter

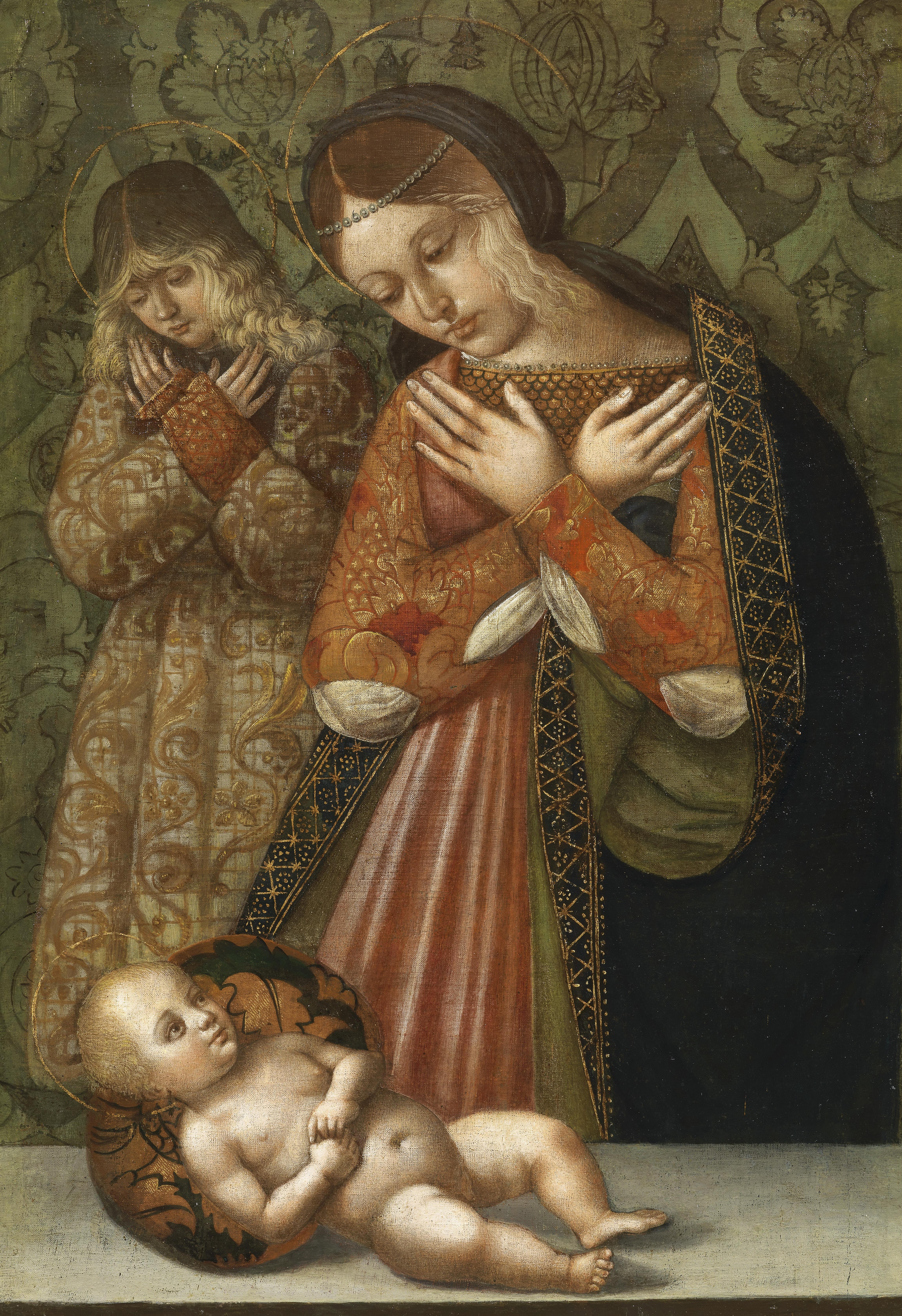
Mary and Angel in Adoration of the Child by Bernardino Zaganelli, private collection

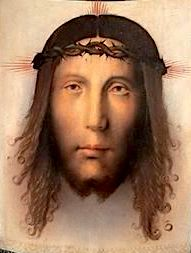
Cloth of Saint Veronica, c. 1500, oil on panel, Philadelphia Museum of Art

Bernardino Zaganelli (Italian pronunciation: [dzaɡaˈnɛlli]), also Bernardino di Bosio Zaganelli and Bernardino da Cotignola, (1460-1470 – 1510) was an Italian painter, of the Renaissance period.

== Biography ==
Not much is known about Bernardino Zaganelli's life except through his works. He was born in Cotignola and worked in Parma and Ravenna. His brother Francesco da Cotignola was also a painter, and he is possibly related to Girolamo Marchesi as well. He primarily painted religious-themed paintings for church commissions, sometimes working with his brother Francesco. One work executed by Bernardino Zaganelli Saint Sebastian is part of the National Gallery collection in London.

One of his pupils in Ferrara was thought to be Antonio Pirri.
