= Francesco da Cotignola =

Italian painter

Francesco da Cotignola (c. 1475–1532), also called Zaganelli (Italian pronunciation: [dzaɡaˈnɛlli]), was an Italian painter of the Renaissance period, active mainly in Parma and Ravenna.

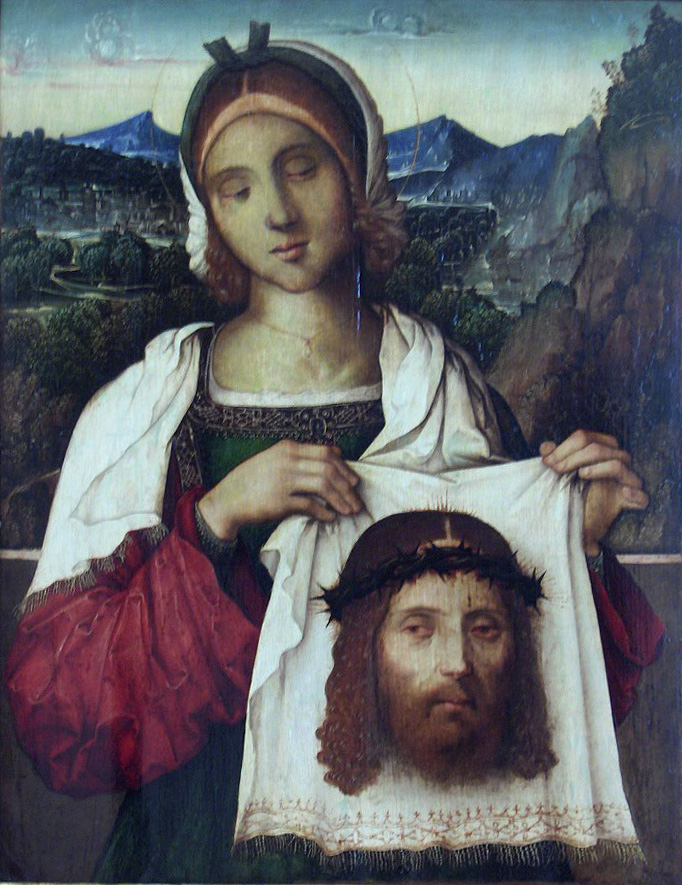
Veronica and the Veil Museo della Città, Rimini, Rimini

He was a pupil of the painter Niccolo Rondinelli. He painted for Basilica of Sant'Apollinare in Classe near Ravenna, Faenza, and Parma. His brother, Bernardino, was also a painter, but nowhere as successful as what Francesco was able to do. He was likely also family of Girolamo Marchesi da Cotignola.
