= Giovanni Baronzio =

Italian painter

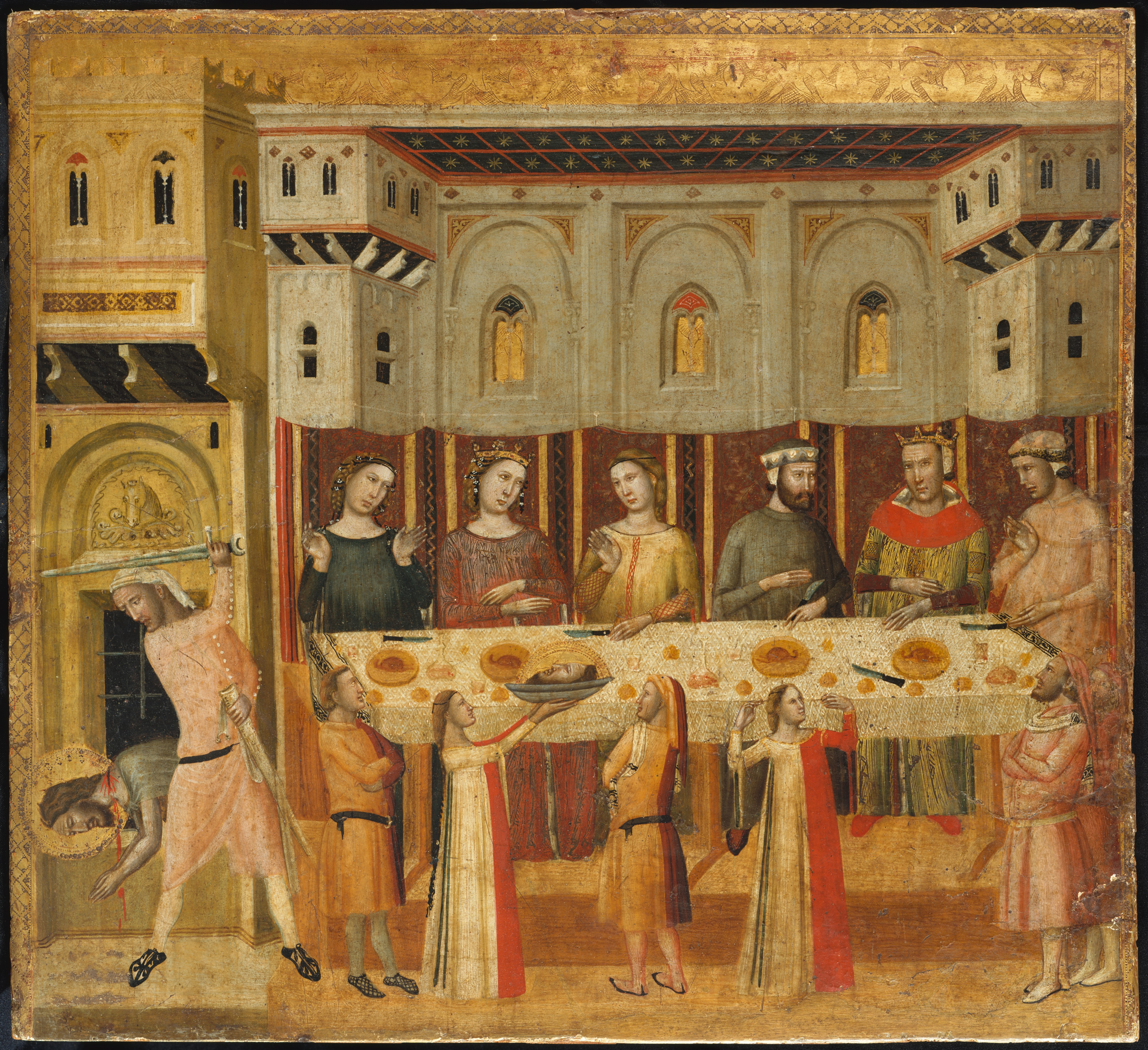
The Feast of Herod and the Beheading of the Baptist

Giovanni Baronzio, also known as Giovanni da Rimini, (died before 1362), was an Italian painter who was active in Romagna and the Marche region during the second quarter of the 14th century. His year of birth is unknown. Giovanni Baronzio was the eminent representative of the second generation of painters of the school of Rimini who were influenced in by the activity of Giotto in Rimini.

== Life ==
The name Johannes Barontius appears in the signature of a polyptych representing the Madonna and Child Enthroned with Saints (Galleria Nazionale delle Marche, Palazzo Ducale, Urbino). The work was originally placed in the church of San Francesco at Macerata Feltria. Usually, Barontius (which is the Latinized form of Baronzio) is a surname. However, from a document of 1362, which records the painter's tomb in the church of San Giuliano in Rimini it is clear that it was a patronymic. The only documentary evidence on the artist to date is a deed dated 1343 that cites “Iohanne Baroncio pictore” as a witness.

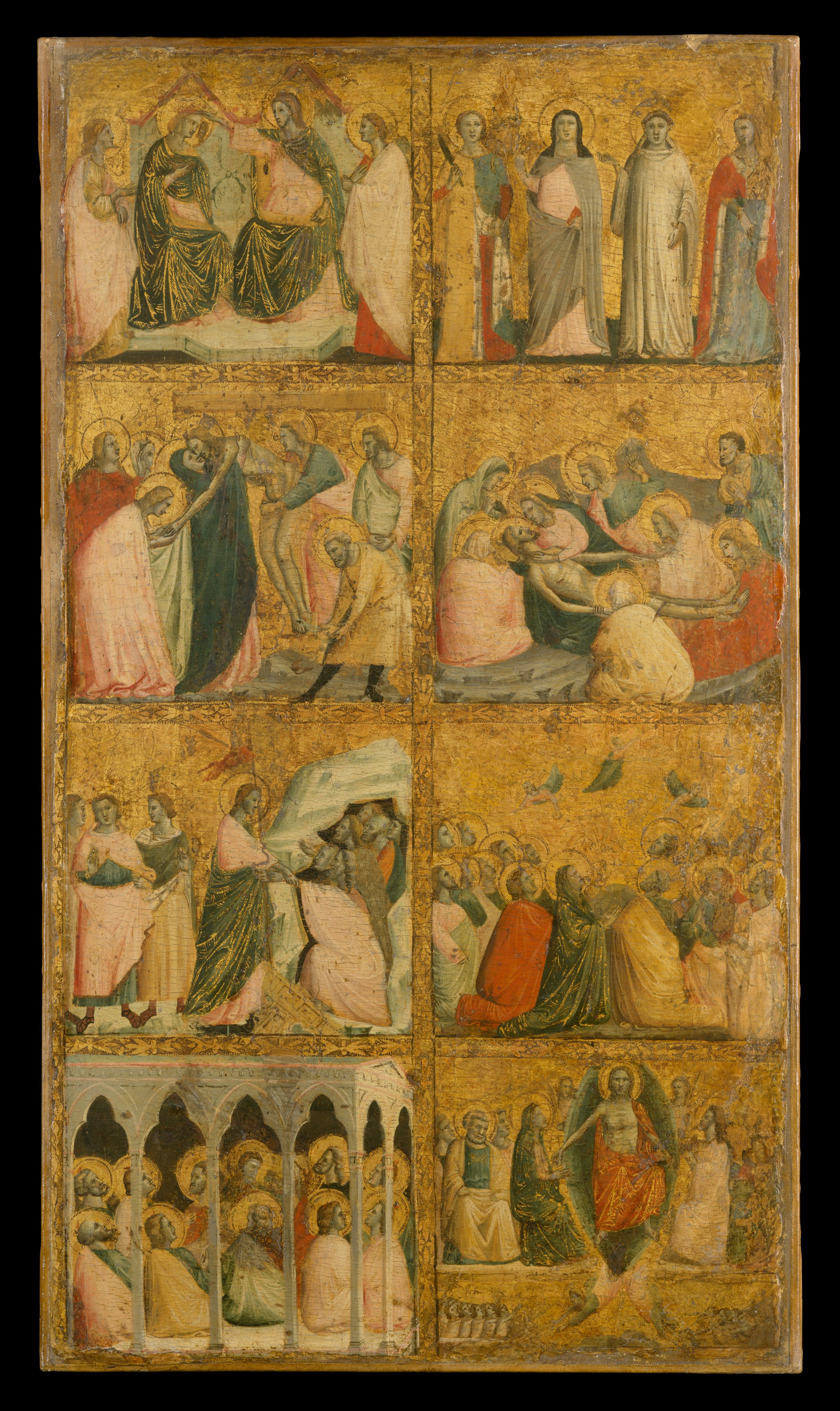
Scenes from the Life of Christ

Based on the style of the painter, who may have been a disciple of Giotto but at second hand, Baronzio must have started his career around 1320 or a little later.

== Work ==
The polyptych representing the Madonna and Child Enthroned with Saints (Galleria Nazionale delle Marche, Palazzo Ducale, Urbino) is the only secure basis for reconstructing his oeuvre. His Scenes from the Life of Christ (mid 1340s, Metropolitan Museum of Art) shows that Baronzio was a competent craftsman using a delicate range of colours. He also appears to have followed established Riminese iconography. Baronzio paid much attention to detail and used chromatic effects and decorative patterns as was common in the ossified traditions of the local school in its later stages.

Baronzio is one of several fourteenth-century painters from Rimini, others being Giuliano, Pietro and Giovanni. The work of the Rimini school was influenced by Giotto who had visited and worked in Rimini.Chiesa di San Francesco

== Other attributions ==
Though unconfirmed, the following works have also been attributed to Baronzio:

- The polyptych with "the Madonna and Saints" in the Church of Saint Francis in Mercatello sul Metauro.
- "The Stories of Christ" in the Galleria Nazionale d'Arte Antica in Rome.
- "The Crucifixion" in the Pinacoteca Vaticana.
- "The Seven Stories of Christ and Four Saints" in the Metropolitan Museum in New York.
- "The Crucifixion" and "Stories from the Passion" in the Pinacoteca in Bologna.
- "The Stories of Saint Colomba" of the Pinacoteca di Brera in Milan
- The fresco "Madonna and Child with Saints Leo, Thomas Aquinas, Iacopo Maggiore, and Dominic" in the Church of Saint Dominic in Fano
- The fresco "Madonna and Child" in the Church of Santa Maria del Piano in Sassoferrato
- "The Crucifixion" in the Church of Saint Francis in Sassoferrato
- "The Madonna and Child with Two Angels" in the Liechtenstein Museum in Vienna
