= Fellini Museum =

Museum in Rimini, Italy

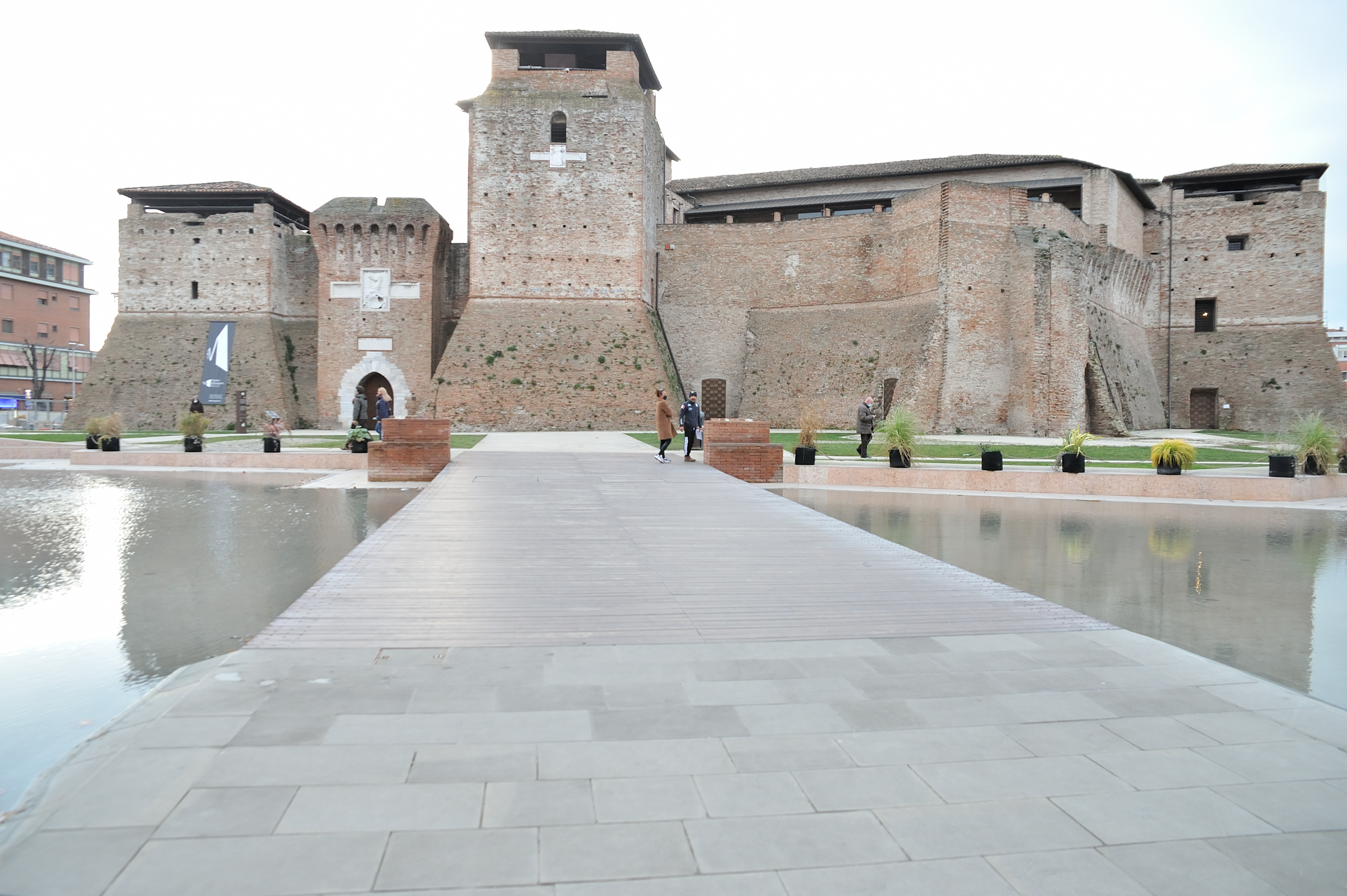
- Castel Sismondo and Piazza Malatesta, comprising part of the museum, in 2022
- Established: 19 August 2021
- Location: Rimini, Italy
- Coordinates: 44.060°N 12.564°E
- Website: https://fellinimuseum.it/en/

The Fellini Museum is a museum in Rimini, Italy, dedicated to Rimini-born film director Federico Fellini. It comprises three locations in Rimini's historic town center: the interior of the Castel Sismondo, a medieval castle; the Fulgor Palace, which houses a cinema; and Piazza Malatesta, the square located outside the castle. The museum was inaugurated on 19 August 2021.

== Exhibitions ==
The Fellini museum occupies three floors of the Castel Sismondo. Its collection includes many of Fellini's drawings, music scores by Fellini's collaborator Nino Rota, alongside photos and clips from various films, and various costumes. The museum also houses a giant sculpture of Anita Ekberg's character Sylvia from La dolce vita and several cinematography exhibitions. The plaza outside the castle, also called the Piazza dei Sogni (plaza of dreams), features a fountain that sprays mist every half hour, alluding to the Rimini fog depicted in several Fellini films.

Fellini films are shown in rotation at the Cinemino, a cinema located on the ground floor of the Fulgor Palace. The remainder of the building, comprising its upper three floors, features exhibits such as artwork and additional memorabilia, along with a digital archive and other research materials. A golden rhinoceros sculpture, which appeared in And the Ship Sails On (E la nave va), is on display at the Piazzetta San Martino outside the Fulgor Palace.

== History ==
Proposals for a Fellini Museum in Rimini date back to the mid-1990s, shortly after Fellini's death. The Casa Museo Fellini, a temporary museum dedicated to Fellini, operated from November 2009 to December 2010 and was managed by the Fondazione Federico Fellini. Several exhibitions and homages to Fellini were also present throughout the city, including an exhibit at the Museo della Città and Fellini-inspired murals in Borgo San Giuliano, along with a park and primary school named in his honor. However, various travelers have remarked on the apparent absence of Rimini's cinematic heritage in Rimini; the eventual opening of the museum would be described as "filling a void".

The Fondazione Federico Fellini, which conserved Fellini's work since 1995, was dissolved in 2015. Its assets – which included Fellini's Book of Dreams, along with hundreds of Fellini's drawings and numerous photos, some of which were unpublished – were acquired by the city council, with the aim of preserving the collection and embracing the city's cinematic heritage and influential role in Fellini's filmmaking. In December 2016, the Italian culture ministry allocated an initial €9 million in funding for the Fellini Museum in its Grandi Progetti Beni Culturali 2017-2018 (Major Cultural Heritage Projects) plan. Construction of the museum began in 2018, with €12 million total in funding allocated; its opening was planned for 2020, the centennial of Fellini's birth. The museum's layout was designed by Milan-based digital art group Studio Azzurro and planned alongside the renovation of the Fulgor Palace, a former cinema frequented by Fellini located in Rimini's historic town center, which underwent renovation from 2013 to 2018.

The museum's opening was delayed due to the COVID-19 pandemic in Italy. On 19 August 2021, at a final cost of over €13.5 million, the museum in the Castel Sismondo was inaugurated, along with the exterior portion at the Piazza Malatesta. Its opening was presented at the 78th Venice International Film Festival. Three months later, on 12 December 2021, the Fulgor Palace exhibits were inaugurated, completing the museum. The museum's opening was celebrated as part of a larger cultural redevelopment project in Rimini.
