= Alberto Marvelli =

Italian layman (1918–1946)

Blessed Alberto Marvelli
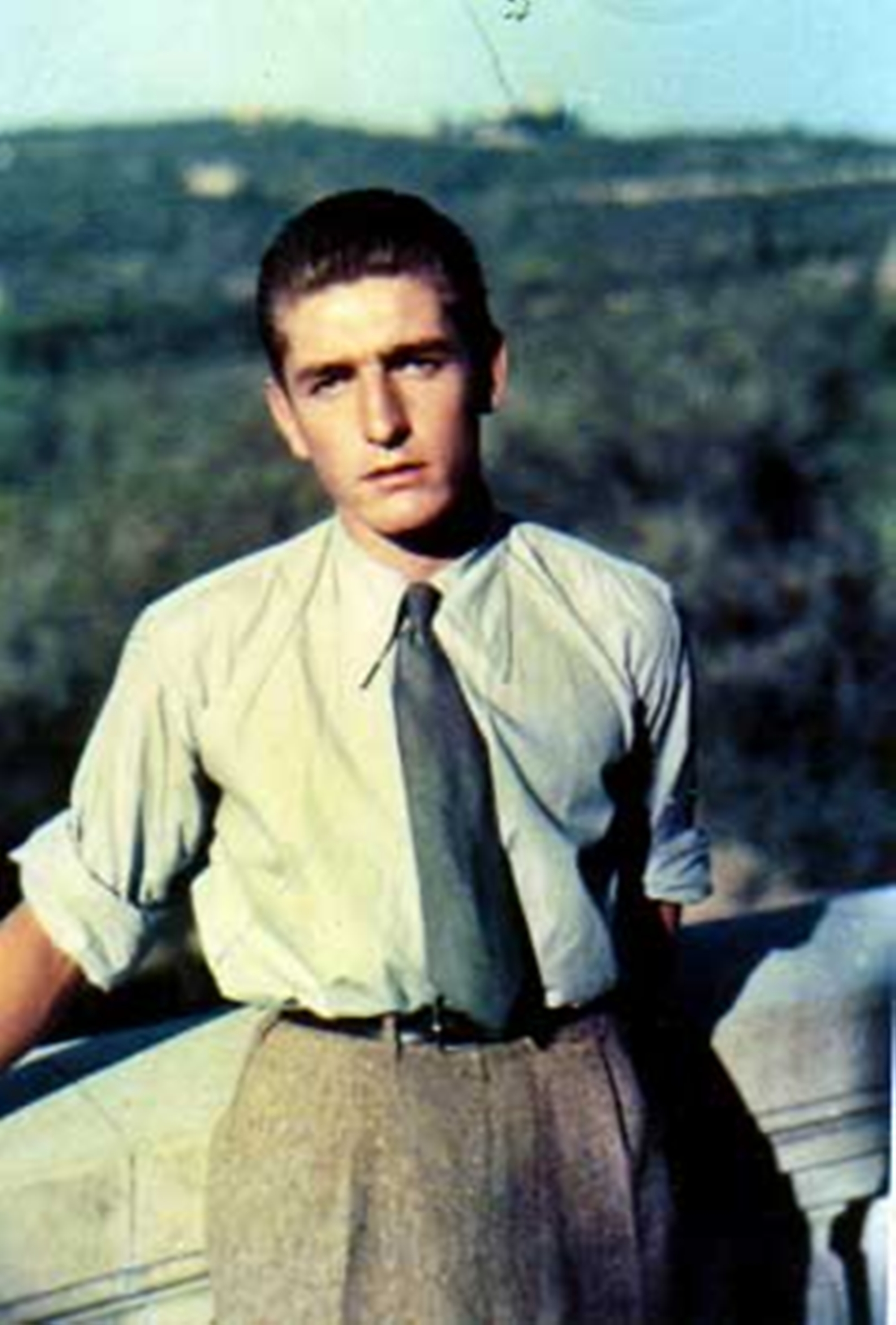
- Marvelli in Florence at his friend's villa.
- Born: 21 March 1918; Ferrara, Kingdom of Italy
- Died: 5 October 1946 (aged 28); Rimini, Italy
- Venerated in: Catholic Church
- Beatified: 5 September 2004, Loreto, Italy by Pope John Paul II
- Major shrine: Sant'Agostino Church, Rimini, Italy
- Feast: 5 October
- Attributes: Young man with a shirt and tie, sometimes holding a book or a rosary
- Patronage: Road safety athletes cyclists footballers politicians youth Catholic Action for bodily purity against hernias

Alberto Marvelli (21 March 1918 – 5 October 1946) was an Italian Catholic and a member of the Catholic Action movement. He became noted for his defense of the poor and for selflessness during World War II in tending to the homeless and wounded despite the devastating air raids while placing himself at risk in doing so. Marvelli also saved numerous people from deportation since he would free them from sealed train carriages before the train could set off. Marvelli was also an active champion for social justice and was known for giving his possessions to the poor and homeless, especially during the harsh winter periods. He served as a town councilor for some time after the war and helped in restoration efforts though he died in an accident before election as a Christian Democrat candidate.

Marvelli's reputation for holiness and his faith led to the cause for his beatification being introduced, and Pope John Paul II beatified Marvelli in 2004 in Loreto.

== Life ==
Alberto Marvelli was born on 21 March 1918 in Ferrara as the second of six children to Luigi Marvelli (a bank clerk) and his wife Maria Mayr.

In his childhood, Marvelli was known for being a thoughtful and reserved individual though with an enthusiastic willingness to aid other people. His mother - who herself worked in charities - was a special influence on his religious formation and often invited the poor to their home. The Marvelli's later moved to Rimini in June 1930. In Rimini, Marvelli attended the Salesian "oratorio" school and was involved with the Catholic Action group in his parish from the age of twelve. One childhood friend of his was the filmmaker Federico Fellini; he loved all kinds of sports and especially cycling. Marvelli's father died unexpectedly on 7 March 1933, leaving his wife to take care of the children alone. It was some months later in October that Marvelli began to keep a spiritual journal. In 1936, aged eighteen, he was elected president of the Italian branch of the Catholic Action movement. He continued his studies at the University of Bologna where he graduated in June 1941 with a degree in engineering and began working with the Fiat company in Turin. He left soon after for conscription into the armed forces in Trieste but was exempted from it after a few months on the grounds that two of his brothers were already in service. It was not long after this that he began teaching in a high school.

Throughout World War II he continued to serve the poor at great personal cost and risk to himself. The family was forced to move to Vergiano - seven kilometres from Rimini - because of the devastating air raids. Despite the risk to his own life, after each bombing he would go back to Rimini to help the wounded and those made homeless by the attack. He is known to have given even his bicycle and the shoes off his feet to those most in need. He also gave out food to them as well as mattresses and blankets for their comfort. During the German occupation he saved numerous people from deportation to the concentration camps and he freed them from the carriages of the trains that had been sealed in readiness for leaving the station at Santarcangelo.

Once the war had ended, the interim authorities entrusted to Marvelli the task of housing allocation and he proved an able administrator. Some months later he was appointed to the town council. He opened a soup kitchen for the poor where he himself served, and as co-founder of Italian Workers' Catholic Action formed a cooperative for construction workers. He agreed to run in elections as a candidate for the Christian Democrats around this point, but died before the elections; people still voted for him, though his mother took his place as a candidate. In 1945 he had joined Luigi Gedda's "Società Operaia".

Marvelli was killed in the evening of 5 October 1946 when a van belonging to the armed forces struck him on a dark road as he cycled to a polling station for an election meeting. Since 1 March 1968 his remains have rested in the Sant'Agostino Church in Rimini in a decorated tomb. The then-Prelate of Loreto, Archbishop Angelo Comastri, speaking on Vatican Radio, said that "one can be in politics and be a saint" as shown by Marvelli's life. He also pointed to the way in which Marvelli had shown a level of honesty and integrity in his political activity that is not always found in the political field.

== Beatification ==
A cause was opened for Marvelli on 29 March 1952. The Congregation for the Causes of Saints issued an official declaration of "nihil obstat" (nothing against the cause) and assigned him the title of Servant of God.

The process of beatification began under Pope Paul VI on 16 January 1975. The conditional process of investigation was held in Rimini from 13 July 1975 until its successful closure on 17 August 1976 while the Congregation validated the investigation on 29 May 1981 in Rome. The postulation (officials in charge of the cause) compiled and submitted the Positio dossier to the Congregation for its evaluation in 1983. It received the approval of theologians on 23 October 1985 and the members of the Congregation confirmed the approval on 4 February 1986. Alberto Marvelli was declared to be Venerable on 22 March 1986 after Pope John Paul II affirmed that he had lived a life of heroic virtue.

The miracle for his beatification was investigated conducted by a tribunal of the Archdiocese of Bologna presided over by Cardinal Giacomo Biffi. On 23 January 1998, meeting in Rome, the Congregation confirmed the validity of the investigation and on 14 November 2002 a panel of medical experts declared they could find no scientific explanation for the healing believed to have been worked at the intercession of Marvelli. Theologians concurred in this decision on 4 March 2003 and their decision was confirmed by the Congregation's members on 20 May 2003. John Paul II issued final assent needed for the miracle on 7 July 2003 and personally beatified Marvelli in Loreto on 5 September 2004.

The miracle that led to his beatification was the healing in August 1991 of a doctor from Bologna named Tito Malfatti of an aggressive hernia. Over 250,000 people attended the beatification celebration.

The current postulator for the cause is the Redemptorist priest Antonio Marazzo and the current vice-postulator is Fausto Lanfranchi.

== Bibliography ==
- Fausto Lanfranchi; card. Ersilio Tonini (preface) (200). Alberto Marvelli : ingegnere manovale della carità. I protagonisti (n. 61) (in Italian) (3rd ed.). Cinisello Balsamo: San Paolo Edizioni. p. 224. ISBN 9788821551000. OCLC 955543761. Referenced by Elisabetta Casadei; Alberto Marvelli; Fausto Lanfranchi; Mario Lusek (2014). Alberto Marvelli : Atleti con l'anima (in Italian). Rimini: Guaraldi. p. 10. ISBN 9788869270215. OCLC 1046027634.
