= Sant'Agostino, Rimini =

Church in Rimini, Italy

Sant'Agostino
- Chiesa di Sant'Agostino
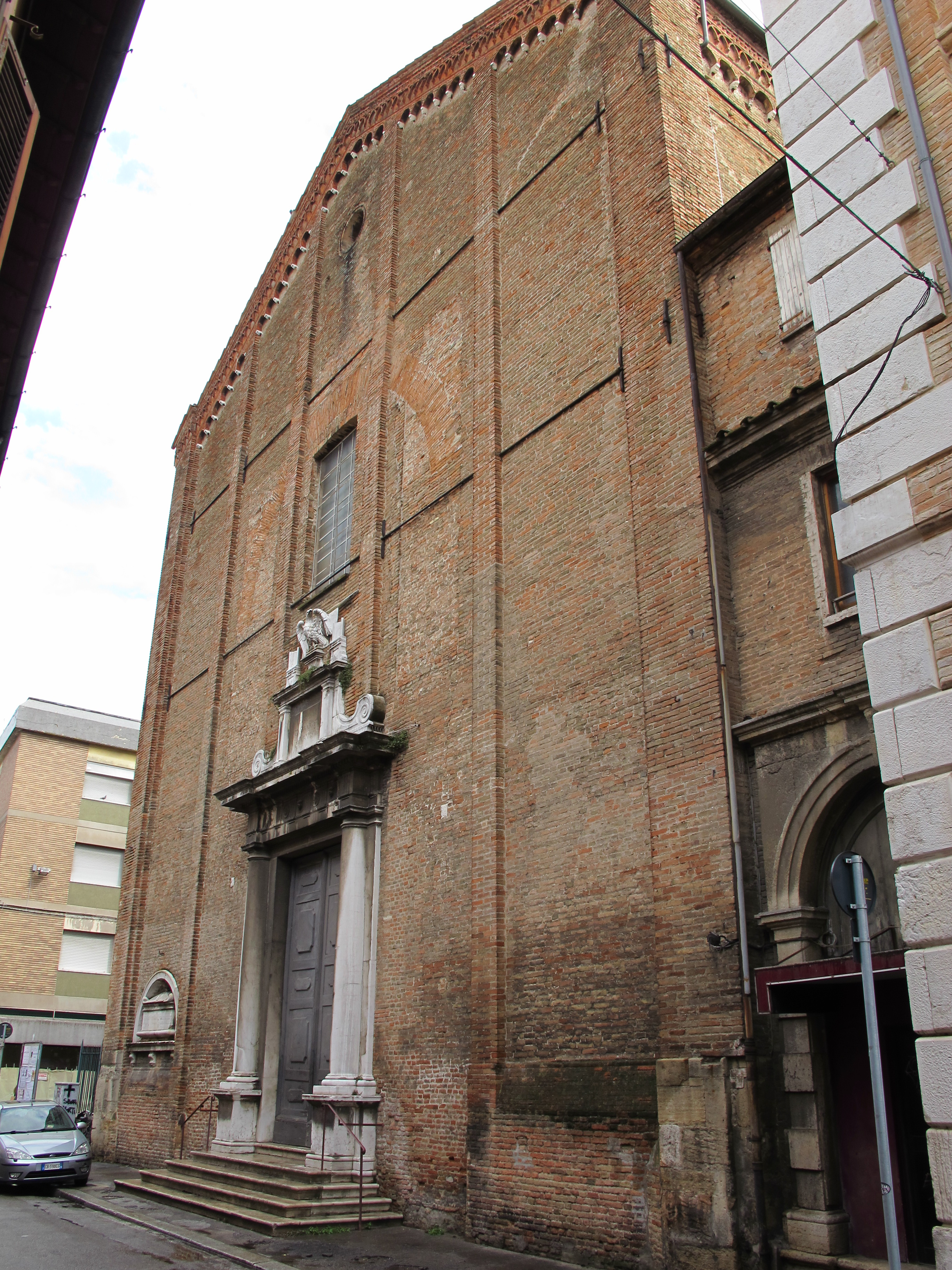
- The church in September 2013
- Sant'Agostino
- 44°3′33.65″N 12°33′58.21″E
- Location: Rimini, Emilia-Romagna
- Address: Via Cairoli 36
- Country: Italy
- Language: Italian
- Denomination: Roman Catholic

History
- Status: Church
- Dedication: Augustine of Hippo

Architecture
- Functional status: Active

Administration
- Archdiocese: Ravenna-Cervia
- Diocese: Rimini

Sant'Agostino is a Romanesque-Gothic-style Roman Catholic church located in Via Cairoli in Rimini, Italy. It is one of the city's oldest extant church buildings.

== History ==
A small parish church or oratory at the site dates to the 1069, originally dedicated to San Giovanni Evangelista. In 1247, with the establishment of monks of the Augustinian order the church was rededicated.

On January 20, 1498, Pandolfo IV Malatesta, then lord of Rimini, sought refuge from a conspiracy to assassinate him called the congiura degli Adimari. He was rescued by some followers, and the conspirators were hung from the walls of the nearby Rocca.

The building was refurbished in 1618 through 1626. In 1797, after the suppression of the order, the church served as cathedral from 1798 to 1809, then it became again the parish church of San Giovanni Evangelista. The reconstruction of the convent, begun in 1787 with designs by Giuseppe Achilli, was never completed. The facade also remains incomplete in brick. On the left of the outer wall of the facade, a marble monument holds the remains of Gian Battista Paci, cavaliere di Santo Stefano, who died in 1615. A 55-meter bell-tower with a pyramidal top is at the rear of the church.

The mortal remains of Blessed Alberto Marvelli were moved to the church of Sant'Agostino, from the city cemetery, in 1974.

== Interior decorations ==
To the right of the entrance is the neoclassical funereal monument to Alberto Mattioli, designed by Luigi Poletti and with a bas-relief sculpted by Pietro Tenerani.

An inventory from 1864 found in the church, the following works:

- The first altar to the right has the venerated crucifix, transferred here from the old Cathedral in 1798
- The second altar to the right, housed an altarpiece depicting St Thomas of Villanova by Marcantonio Franceschini and a medallion in chiaroscuro depicting the Glory of St Thomas by Filippo Pasquali
- The second altar on the left, had a paintings depicting St John and St Facondo by Giovanni Battista Costa.
- The second chapel housed a canvas depicting the Madonna della Cintura by Giorgio Picchi.
- The third altar to the left once housed a Nativity painted by Giacomo Palma the Younger. The stucco-work is by Sansone of Bologna.
- The main altarpiece was a St John the Baptist by Giovanni Laurentini. A God the father in the altar was painted by the Augustinian priest, Cesare Pronti dalla Cattolica, a disciple of Guercino.
- The church ceiling had stuccoes completed by Ferdinando Bibiena, and ovals frescoed by Vittorio Bigari.
- The sacristy housed a Martyrdom of St Sebastian attributed to Padovanino.

Fragments of frescoes, circa 1300, attributed to Giovanni da Rimini, a follower of Giotto, are found in the main chapel and the bell-tower.

The 1916 Rimini earthquakes caused eighteenth-century plaster on the church's apse to collapse, revealing forgotten fourteenth-century frescoes, which have been attributed to the Maestro dell'Arengo. These frescoes depict the Life of the Saint and the Last Judgement. The latter fresco is now displayed in the Civic Museum on Via Tonini.
