= Diptych by Giovanni da Rimini =

Pair of paintings in London and Rome

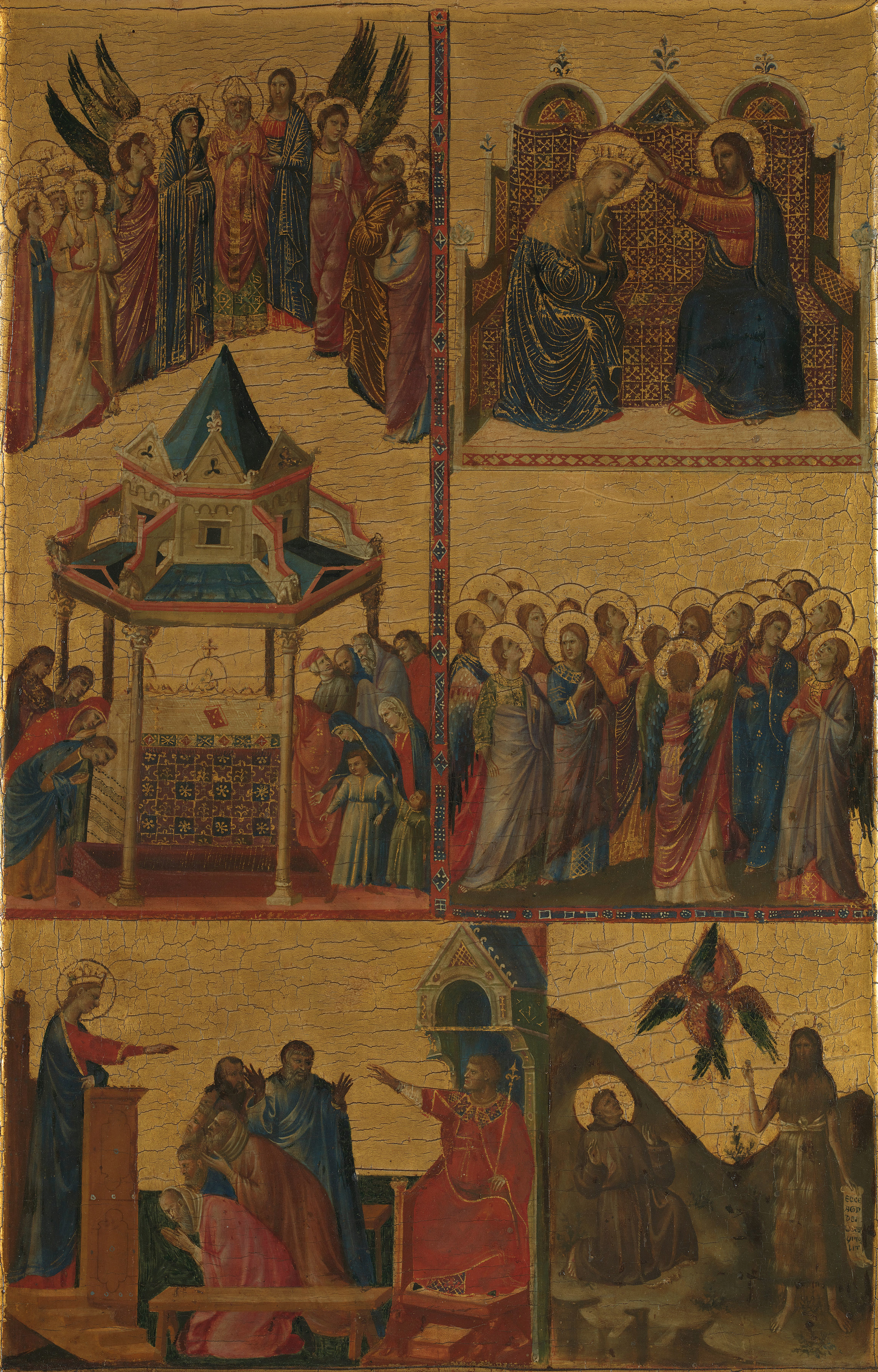
Scenes from the Lives of the Virgin and other Saints, National Gallery; oil, tempera, and gilding on wood; 54.5 centimetres (21.5 in) by 36.5 centimetres (14.4 in)

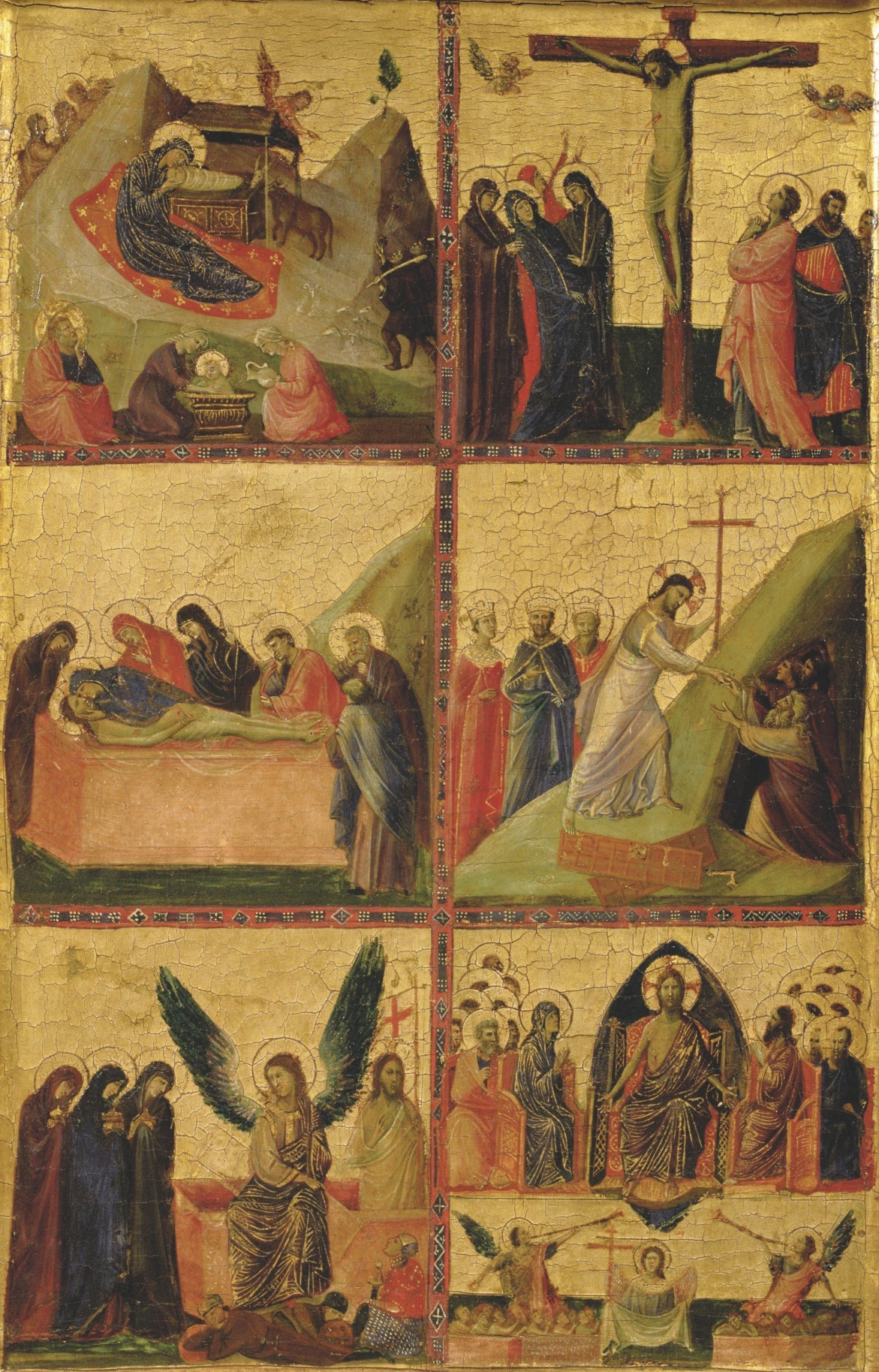
Scenes from the Life of Christ, Galleria Nazionale d'Arte Antica, Palazzo Barberini; tempera on wood; 52.5 centimetres (20.7 in) by 34.5 centimetres (13.6 in)

Among the paintings attributed to Giovanni da Rimini (fl. 1292–1336) are two panels from a former diptych, dated to 1300–1305, of which the left wing is in the collection of the National Gallery, London, and the right that of the Galleria Nazionale d'Arte Antica, Palazzo Barberini, Rome.

== Giovanni da Rimini ==
Giovanni, pictor (painter), later maestro (master), is known from legal documents to have lived in Rimini between 1292 and 1336. This Giovanni is thought to be the same as the artist of the inscribed crucifix (it) in San Francesco (it), Mercatello sul Metauro, inscribed IOH(ann)ES PICTOR FECIT HOC OPUS / FR(atri) TOBALDI, attesting to its creation by Giovanni the Painter, and dated 1309. Three or four other crucifixes are identified as being by the same artist, influenced by that (it) of Giotto: the "Diotallevi” Crucifix (it), in the Museo della città, Rimini (it); another in San Lorenzo, Talamello; another in San Francesco, Sassoferrato; and a fourth sold at Sotheby's in 2015. Giovanni's panel paintings include what is probably half of a second diptych, The Virgin and Child with Five Saints, in the Pinacoteca Comunale di Faenza (it). Also attributed to Giovanni are wall paintings in the Campanile Chapel of Sant'Agostino, Rimini (it), similarly showing Giotto's influence. Once confused with Giovanni Baronzio, Giovanni da Rimini's career and the beginnings of the fourteenth-century Riminese School have been reconstructed by scholars in recent decades, beginning with the 1935 exhibition La pittura riminese del Trecento, organised by Cesare Brandi.

== Scenes from the Lives of the Virgin and other Saints ==
The diptych's left wing, once owned by the Barberini family, and subsequently by Pietro and Vincenzo Camuccini, was acquired as being by Giotto by Algernon Percy, 4th Duke of Northumberland in 1853, for £100. At Alnwick Castle thereafter, the painting passed by descent to the 12th Duke of Northumberland, before being sold at Sotheby's in 2014 for £5.7 million, including buyer's premium. A temporary export bar was placed on the painting, on the grounds of it meeting "Waverley Criteria" 2 and 3, being of "outstanding aesthetic value" and in excellent condition, and of "outstanding significance for the study of Trecento painting in Rimini". With the financial assistance of Ronald Lauder, son of Estée Lauder, the painting was acquired by the National Gallery in 2015, under an agreement that would see it loaned back to the benefactor for the remainder of his lifetime, with triennial displays at the Gallery, the first in 2017.

The "jewel-like" painting, showing the influence of Byzantine art and of Giotto, comprises four scenes in an unusual iconographic combination that likely reflects the donor's wishes. Of the four scenes, the top two are of a double height, the bottom two separated by the edge of the throne in place of a decorative band. They depict, from left to right, top to bottom, the Apotheosis of Saint Augustine, above a Gothic temple standing over the saint's empty tomb, the Coronation of the Virgin, above a crowd of onlooking saints and angels, Saint Catherine disputing with the philosophers before Emperor Maxentius, and a pairing of the episodes of Saint Francis receiving the stigmata and Saint John the Baptist in the wilderness, proclaiming the coming of the Messiah, with a winged cherub in-between. John the Baptist's scroll reads ECCE / AGN(us) / DEI / ECCE / Q(u)I TO(l) / LIT (peccata mundi) Behold the Lambe of God, which taketh away the sinne of the world (John 1.29, KJV).

== Scenes from the Life of Christ ==
The right wing of the diptych formed part of the Sciarra Collection until 1897 and is now in the Galleria Nazionale d'Arte Antica, Palazzo Barberini, Rome. Separated by decorative bands, the six zones of equal size depict, from left to right, top to bottom, the Nativity, with Christ's first bath in the foreground, the Crucifixion, the Entombment, the Descent into Limbo, the Resurrection, with the Three Marys at the Tomb, and the Last Judgment.

== See also ==
- Giuliano da Rimini
- Pietro da Rimini
- Neri da Rimini (it)
