= Chiesa dei Teatini, Rimini =

Church in Emilia-Romagna, Italy

Coordinates: 44.0606°N 12.5700°E

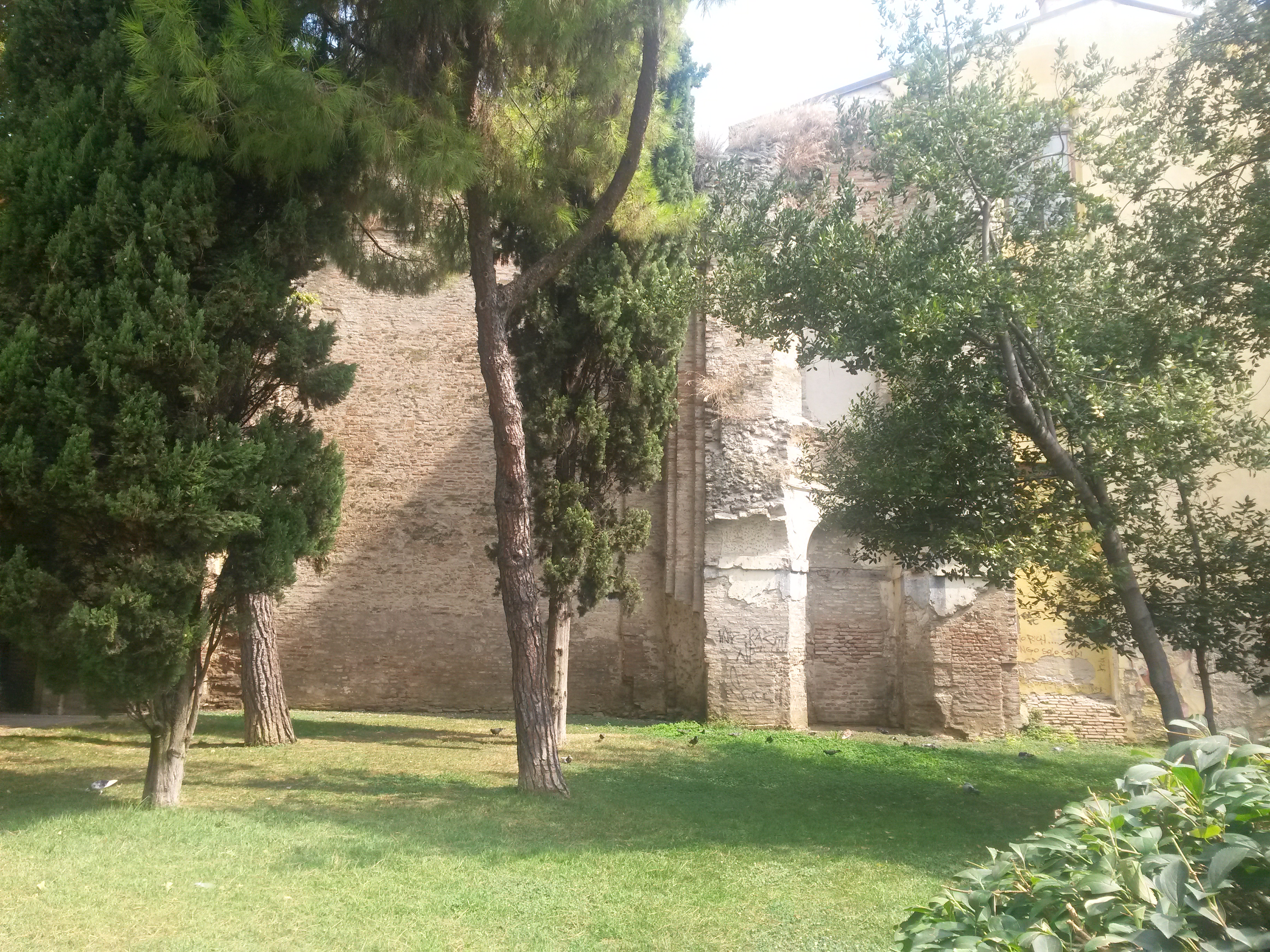
Ruins of the church of the Theatines

The Chiesa dei Teatini or the church of the Theatines, was a Baroque-style Roman Catholic church located in Rimini, region of Emilia-Romagna, Italy. The church was destroyed during the fierce bombardments preceding the Battle of Rimini in 1944, and only ruins of the interior of the apse remain in a park where the church once stood. A plaque recalls the former church.

== History ==
The church was once the parish church called San Giorgio Antico. In 1613, it was refurbished by the Theatines, who dedicated the church to St Antony of Padua. The Good Friday earthquake of 1672 collapsed the roof, killing dozens of town-folk, both noble and common, seeking refuge after the initial tremors. A reduced church was erected, with a new facade designed by Camillo Morigia of Ravenna, ultimately completed after another earthquake in 1786. In the 19th century, the church and a nearby convent and school belonged to the Ursuline order.

The main altar had a canvas depicting St Antony preaching to the Fish by Giovanni Francesco Nagli, called il Centino. It is flanked by a Madonna in Glory and a Nativity by Andrea Sansone. The second altar on the right had a painting of St Cajetan and St Andrea Avellino by Giovanni Battista Bolognino. The third altar had a painting depicting St Phillip Neri by Marcantonio Franceschini. The pilasters under the choir had marble busts of Luigi and Filippo Marcheselli, by Giuseppe Torretti. It is unclear if the works survived the war.
