= National Museum of Ravenna =

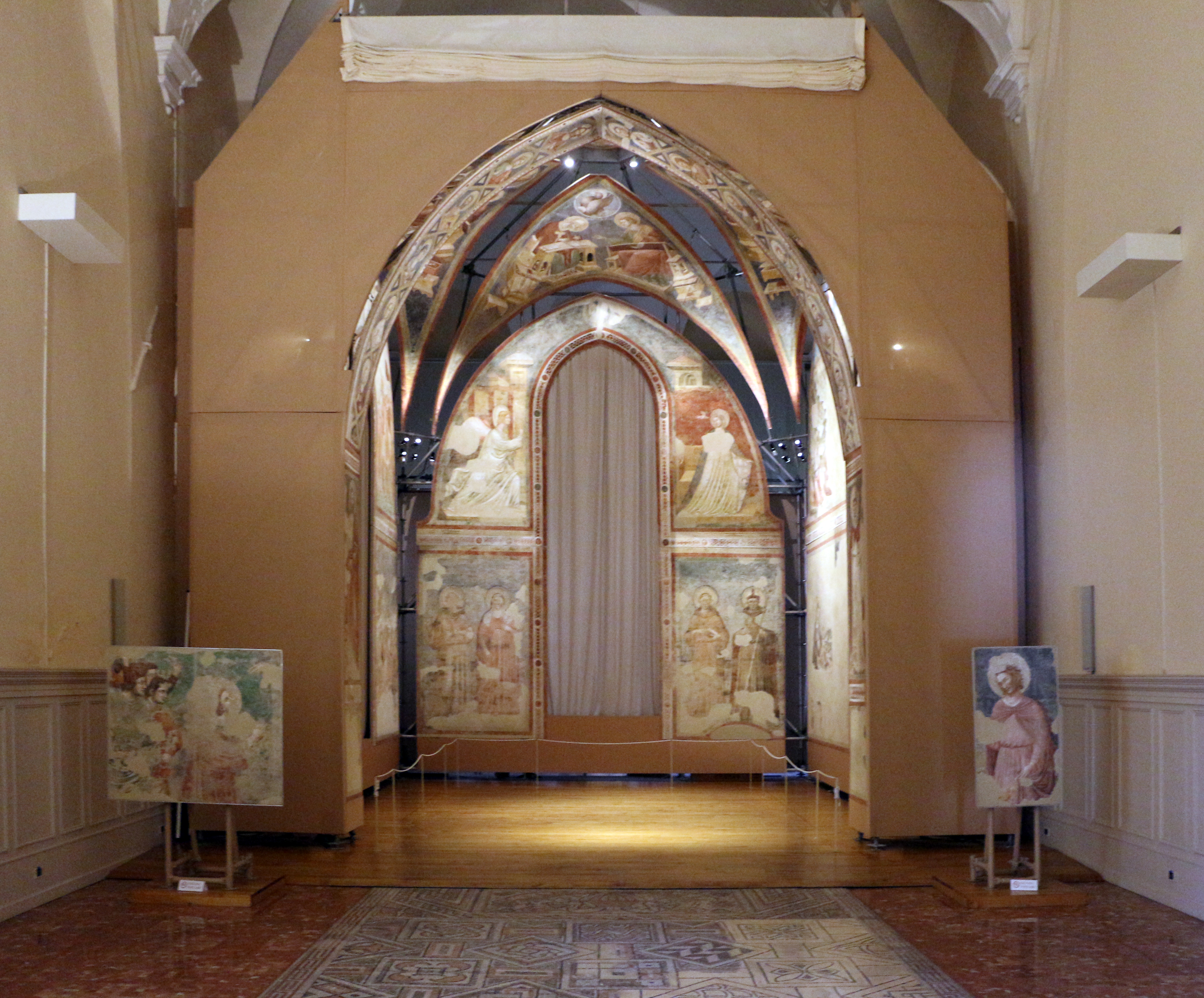
Detached Frescoes from Santa Clara by Pietro da Rimini

The Museo Nazional di Ravenna or National Museum of Ravenna displays a collection of archeologic, artistic and artisanal objects. It is located in the Benedictine monastery of San Vitale on via San Vitale, Ravenna, Italy.

The collection, initially assembled through the efforts of local erudite Camaldolese monks, was established as a museum in 1885, and moved to this site by the early 20th century.

It contains a large collection of Ancient Roman artifacts, including lapidary epitaphs and portions from sepulchral monuments. The artifacts date from early Roman through Byzantine in scope.

It also displays Renaissance bronzes, and ivory collection, a large number of icons, ceramics, and ancient armor and weapons. Also on display is the detached 14th-century frescoes, originally from the church of Santa Clara, completed by Pietro da Rimini.
