= San Bartolomeo, Rimini =

Roman Catholic church in Rimini, Italy

Coordinates: 44°3′30.7″N 12°34′24″E

San Bartolomeo, also known as the Santi Bartolomeo e Marino or Santa Rita, is a Baroque-style Roman Catholic church located in Rimini, region of Emilia-Romagna, Italy.

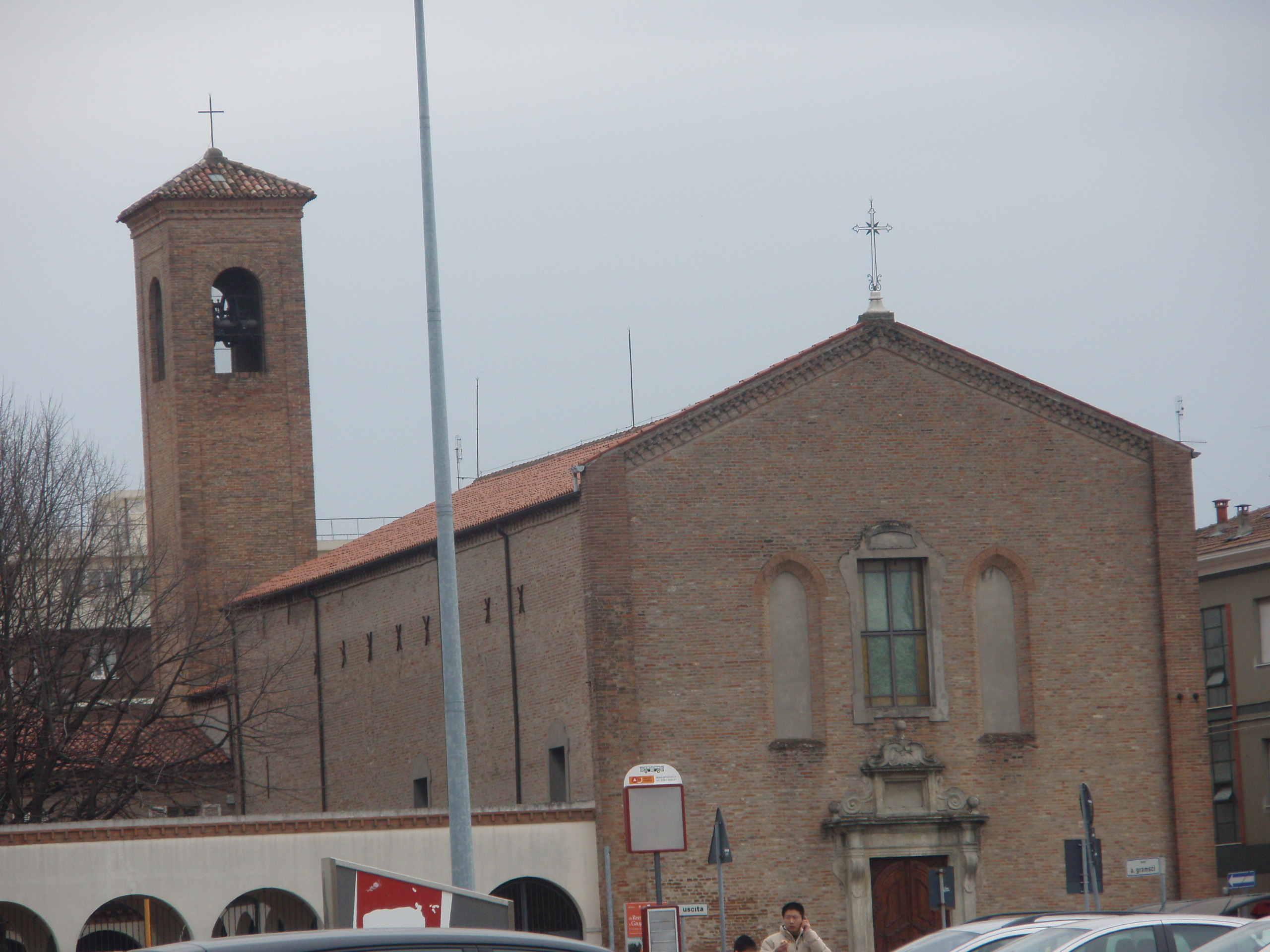
View of the church

== History ==
The church was founded in the 12th century at the site of an original 5th-century chapel dedicated to San Marino. It was assigned to the Lateran Canons in 1464 until 1797. The church building was restored in 1865.

The first chapel on the right has a detached fresco, depicting the Madonna, brought here in 1807 from the Convent of the Cappuccini. An altarpiece depicts Sant'Ubaldo frees the possessed by Francesco Stringa. The main altar has a copy of Giuseppe Ribera's Martyrdom of St Bartholemew. At one time the main altarpiece was a St Marino and Saints now found in the Chapel of Leo XII in Spoleto. The ceiling has three large canvases (1655) by il Centino; some of the other canvases were by Alessandro Codrini of Rimini. Some frescoes were attributed to Bartolomeo Cesi.

The frescoes in the choir depict the Life of St Marino (1595) by Giorgio Picchi. The intarsio oak choir stalls date to the 16th century. To the right of the presbytery is a monument by Antonio Trentanove dedicated to Pope Pius VI, who stayed in the adjacent convent in 1782, while travelling to Vienna.

The church also has a venerated image of Santa Rita.
