= San Bernardino, Rimini =

Church building in Rimini, Italy

Coordinates: 44.0582°N 12.5680°E

San Bernardino or San Bernardino da Siena is a Baroque-style Roman Catholic church located in vicolo San Bernardino #26 in Rimini, Italy. The church and adjacent convent are now affiliated with Clarissan Order nuns.

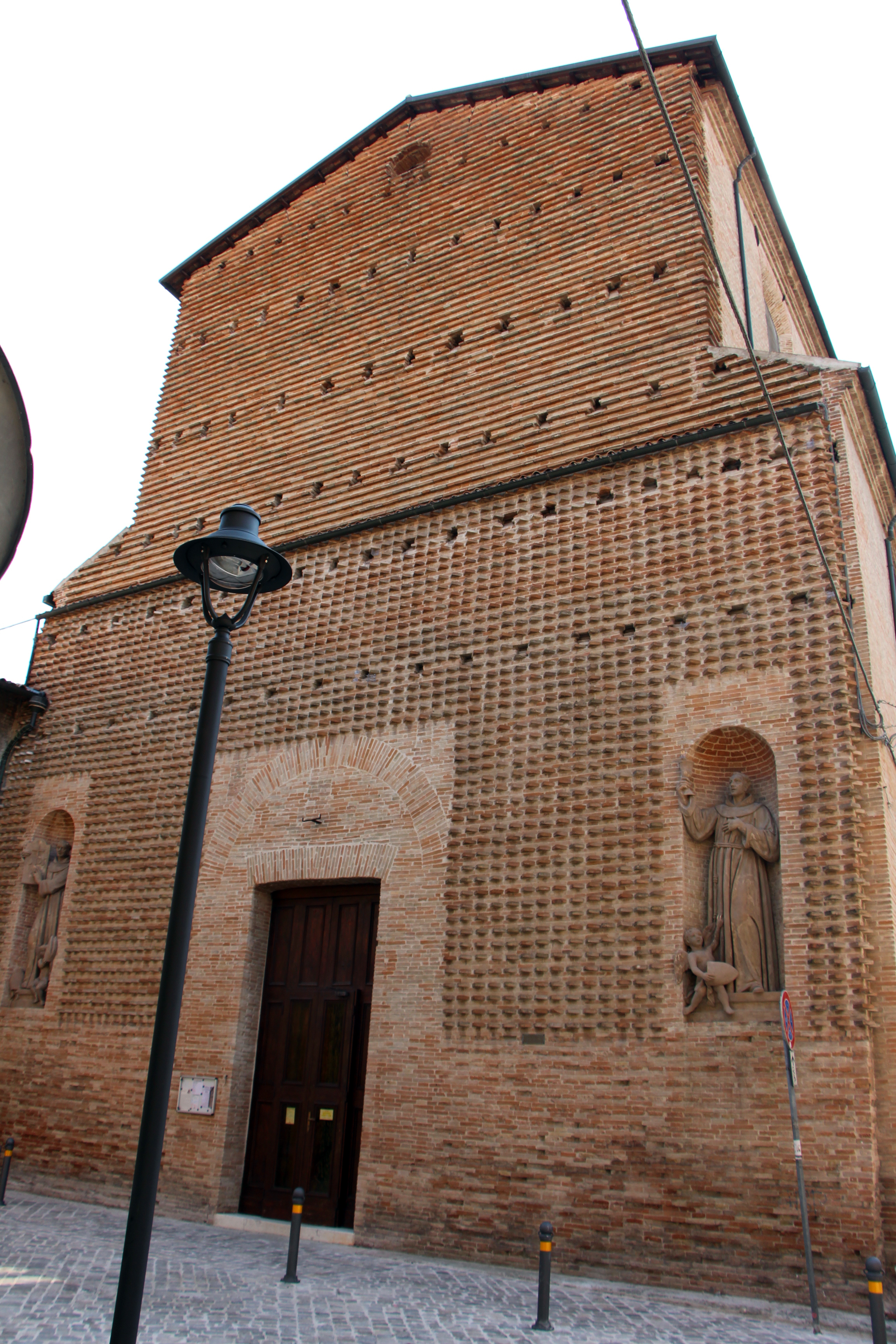
Church of San Bernardino

== History ==
An oratory at the site was founded in 1485 as a part of a hospice of the Frati delle Grazie. It then passed on to the property of the Conventual Franciscans (Minori Osservanti) who commissioned the architect Giovanni Francesco Buonamici to reconstruct a church in 1759. Completed posthumously in 1761 with his designs, Buonamici was buried in the church. The Franciscan order was suppressed by 1810, but remained in the site till 1816.

The simple brick facade is decorated with a diamond point pattern; the main portal is flanked by statues of St Bernardino da Siena and St Giacomo della Marca sculpted in 1765 by Carlo Sarti. He also completed the St Francis of Assisi in the niche in the right rear corner of the church. The main altar has angels with the Franciscan symbols (1758–1759) sculpted by Sarti.

The interior has six lateral altars. An inventory from 1864, lists the following art works:

- St Bernardino da Siena presents the Pope with the Rule of his Institution by Giovanni Laurentini
- St Francis of Assisi receives stigmata by Donato Creti (2nd altar)
- The Virgin with St Margaret of Cortona and St Pier Regalato by Ercole Graziani the younger
- St Diego of Alcalà cures a blind boy, St John of Capistrano, and St Pasquale Baylon (1732–1746) also by Creti in altars I and III on the left.
- Wall frescoes in the main chapel were completed by Arlotti
- The sacristy has a wooden Crucifix carved by Innocenzo da Petralia.

The facade has a plaque remembering the 56 victims of a bombardment, who had taken refuge in the adjacent convent, on December 28, 1943.
