= Giovan Francesco Buonamici =

Italian architect and painter

Giovan Francesco Buonamici (1692- 4 August 1759) was an Italian architect and painter of the Baroque period, active mainly around Ravenna, Fano, and his native Rimini.

== Biography ==
He was born in Rimini, and may have worked as painter as young man, working with his brother who was decorating the ceiling of the parish church of San Martino in Rimini. Giovanni Francesco studied painting with Carlo Cignani. Only one independent painting (1723) by Buonamici is known, depicting the Consecration of Monsignor Maffeo Nicolò Farsetti. He began working as an architect for the Cathedral of Ravenna under the patronage of the archbishop Farsetti. In 1731–1732, he worked on the restoration of the cappella Sancta Sanctorum in Basilica of San Vitale, Ravenna. The baroque decorations were removed in the 1904 refurbishment. During 1734 to 1745, he worked on the reconstruction of the Duomo di Ravenna. This work gained him nomination by Farsetti as knight in the Order of the Golden Spur. Buonamici also worked (1721) in the San Francesco Saverio in Rimini. He also made designs in 1738 for churches in Santarcangelo di Romagna. In 1740, he designed a town tower for Fano.

He was particularly active in his native Rimini, where he worked in the local Pescheria (1747); the renovation of the church of Santi Giovanni e Paolo; the church of San Simone; the reconstruction of former Torre dell’Orologio in Piazza Giulio Cesare (1759) (subsequently razed); San Bernardino; and the stairs in the entrance of the Bishop's palace (1750).

In 1758, he was nominated Academic of Honor of the Accademia di San Luca in Rome. Buonamici died in Rimini.
