= Castel Sismondo =

Castle in Rimini, Italy

Coordinates: 44.059489°N 12.564023°E

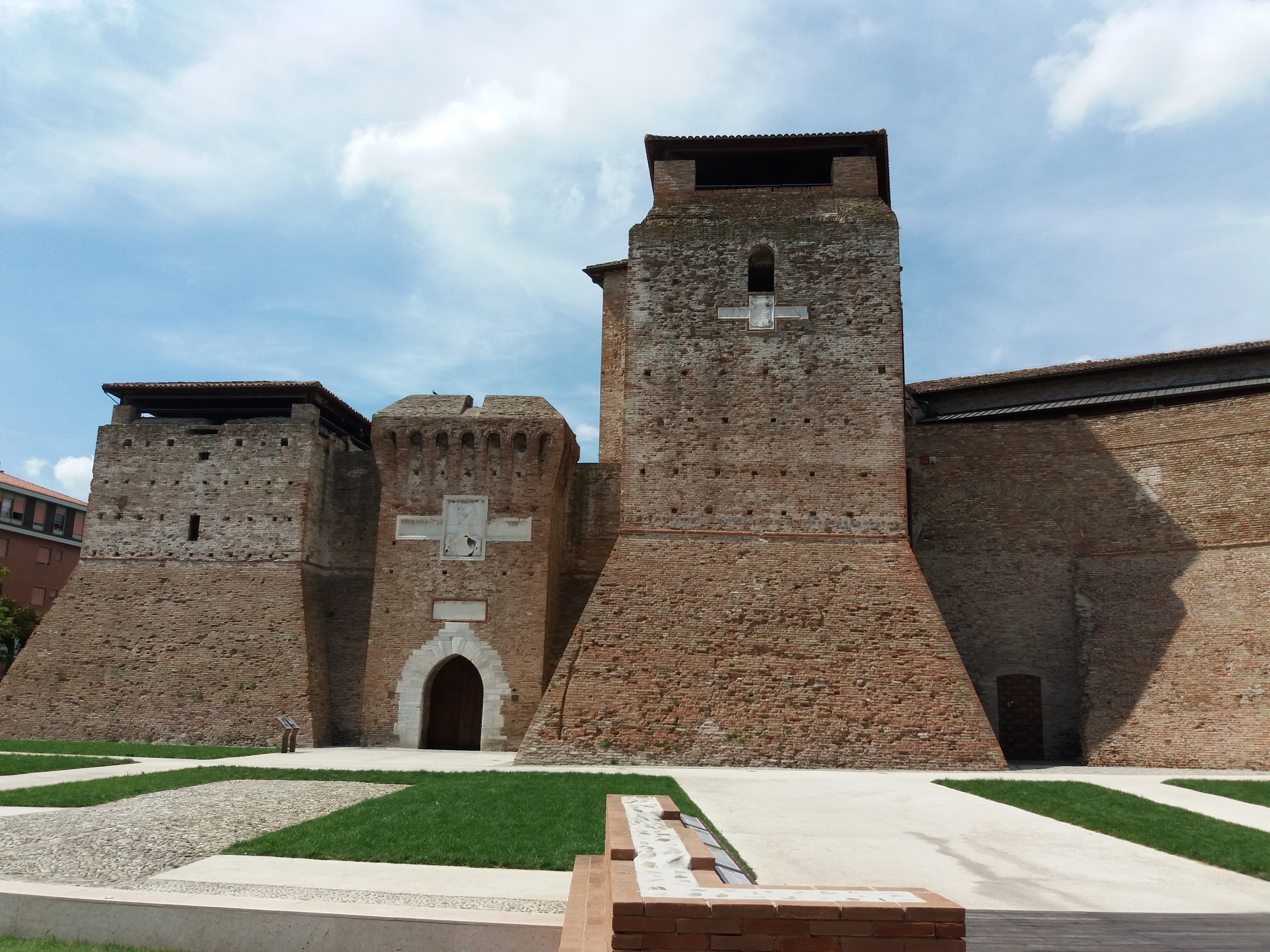
Castel Sismondo

Castel Sismondo is a castle in Rimini, Romagna, northern Italy.

Only the central nucleus of the structure remains. Since 2021, the castle is one of three sites of the Fellini Museum.

== History ==
=== Malatesta period ===
The castle was built by Sigismondo Pandolfo Malatesta, Lord of Rimini. Construction is recorded to have begun exactly at 6.48pm on 20 March 1437, and though the castle was declared officially completed in 1446, work was still being done in 1454.

Castel Sismondo was conceived as a palace and fortress. Though contemporary sources credit Malatesta with its design, it employed a coalition of architects and engineers including Filippo Brunelleschi, who visited Rimini for two months in 1438 as part of a series of inspections of Malatesta fortresses across Romagna and the Marche.

Malatesta died in the castle on 7 October 1468.

=== Later history ===
In 1821 the castle was turned into barracks for the local Carabinieri. Five years later, the external walls were demolished and the moat filled. After a period of decline, the edifice is now used for cultural exhibitions.

== Architecture ==
The fortress is characterized by large square towers and scarp walls, which would have fed into a moat.

The city entrance was offered by a double ravelin with drawbridges, adorned with a coat of arms, likely sculpted by an artist from Veneto. Malatesta's name is written to the left and right of the coat of arms.

Large marble epigraphs in the walls pay tribute to Malatesta.

The walls were thought to be thick enough to bear the impact of the new artillery pieces of that period. Although originally positioned externally from the city, it has no towers facing that side: all towers are oriented towards the city. These towers are square, and once housed a bronze cannon each.

The central part of the castle was also the Malatesta residence, with rooms decorated with tapestries, curtains, and frescoes. Also, the exterior was decorated, as suggested by the few maiolica tiles visible.
