= Giuliano da Rimini =

Italian painter

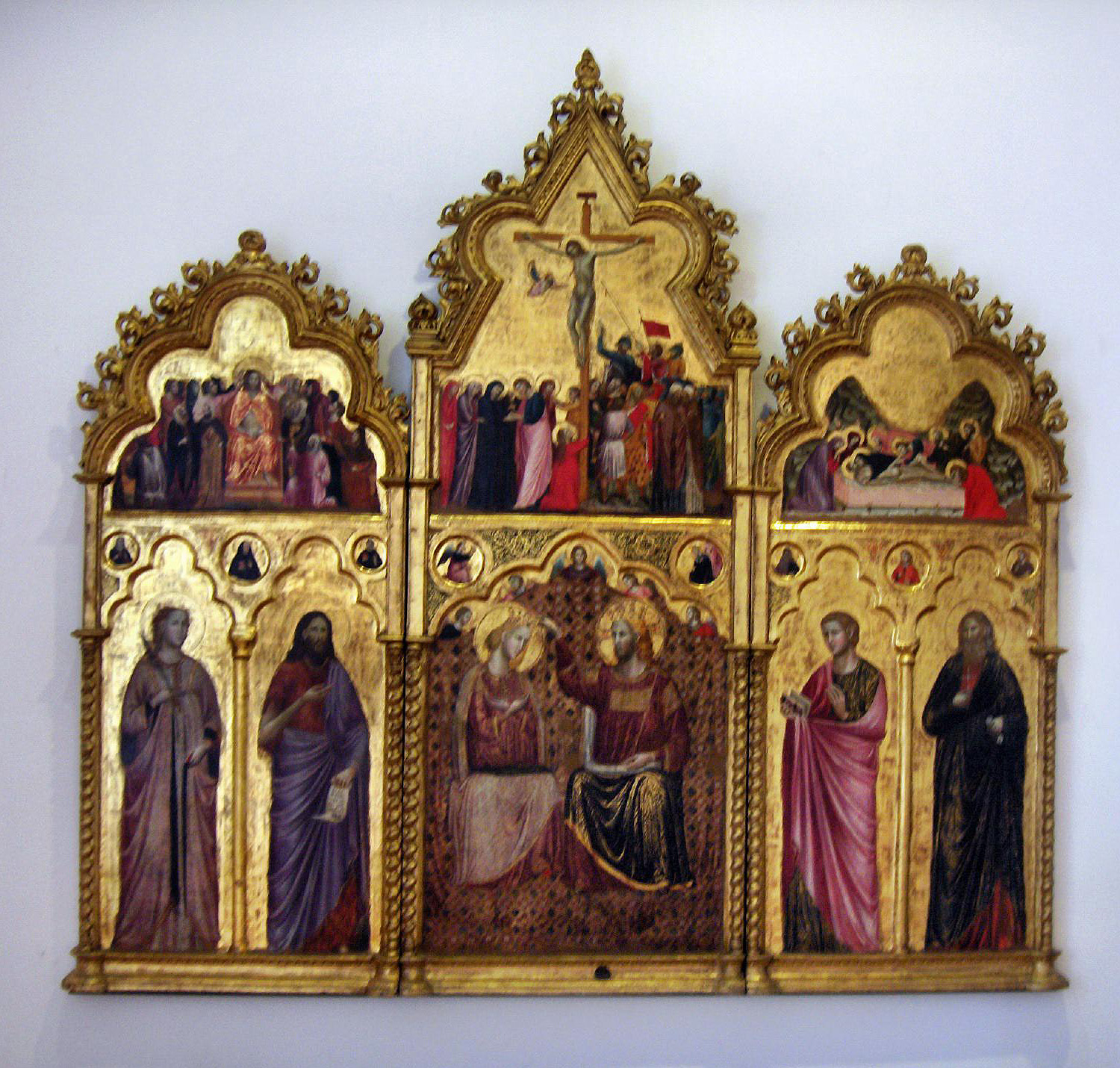
A da Rimini altarpiece, 14th century

Giuliano da Rimini was an Italian painter, c. 1307 to 1324.

He is one of three painters from Rimini, namely Giuliano, Pietro, and Giovanni in the early 14th century. The work of the Rimini school may have influenced Giotto during his visit to Rimini.

Details of his life are sketchy at best, but a signed and dated work by him depicts the Madonna Enthroned with saints, now at the Gardner Museum in Boston. Also, his works depicting the Passion of Christ and death of Christ, are exhibited in museums in Rimini.
