= San Francesco Saverio, Rimini =

Church building in Rimini, Italy

Coordinates: 44.0624°N 12.5672°E

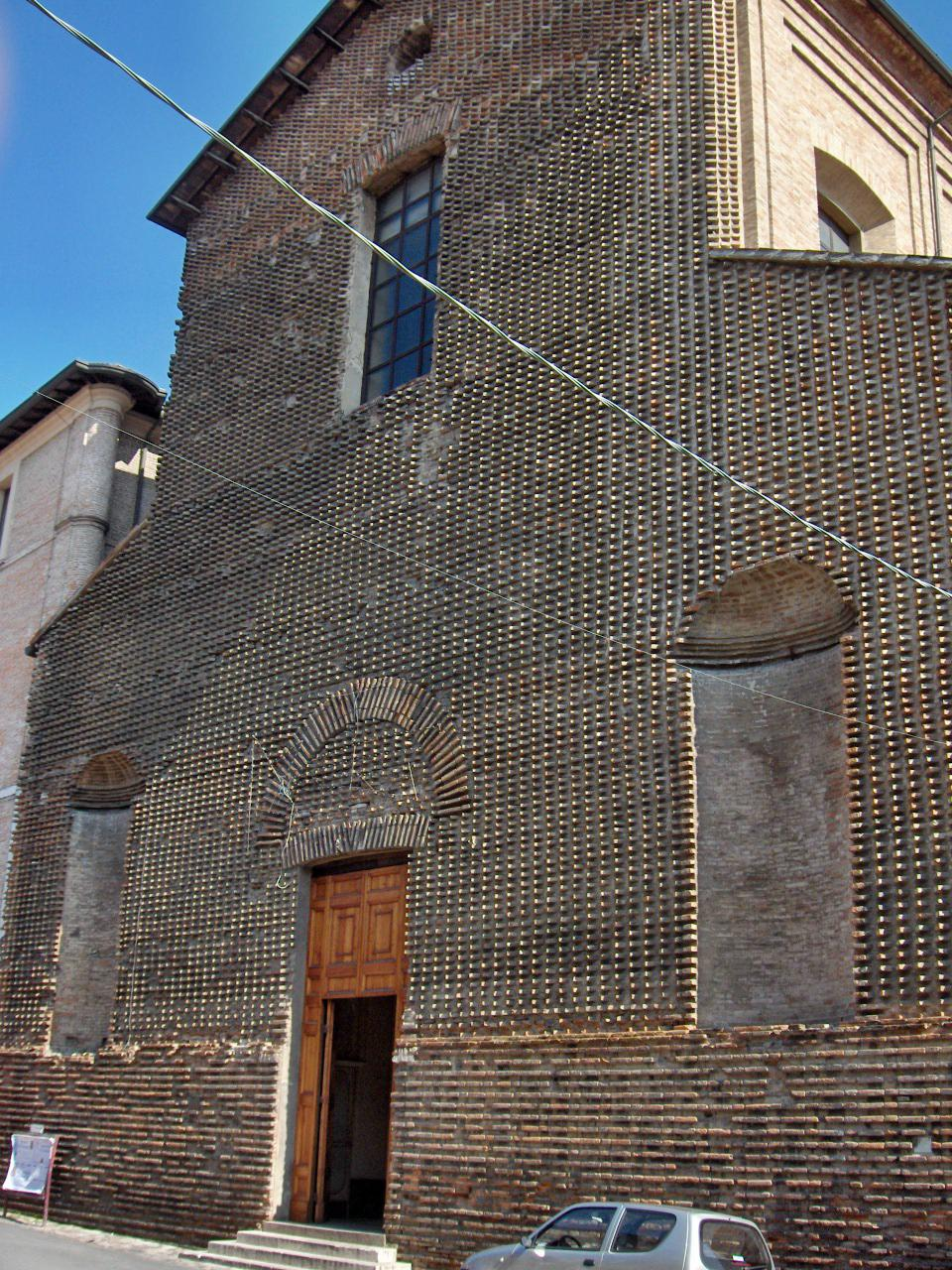
The facade

San Francesco Saverio also known as the Church of the Suffragio is a Baroque-style Roman Catholic church located in Piazza Ferrari #12 in Rimini, Italy. The church rises adjacent to the former convent of the Jesuits (now a civic museum).

== History ==
The church was commissioned by the Jesuit order and built in 1721. The Jesuits previously had been housed in a site in Santa Maria a Mare. The design had been attributed to either Giovanni Francesco Buonamici or Francesco Garampi.

The layout is modelled on the Gesù church in Rome. Adjacent to the church was once the Jesuit convent, which was for years a hospital, and now serves as Civic Museum. The facade remains incomplete in brick, but the interior is richly decorated, despite the suppression of the Jesuits by papal bull in 1773.

The adjacent convent once was a hospital, then a museum.

== Interior decoration ==
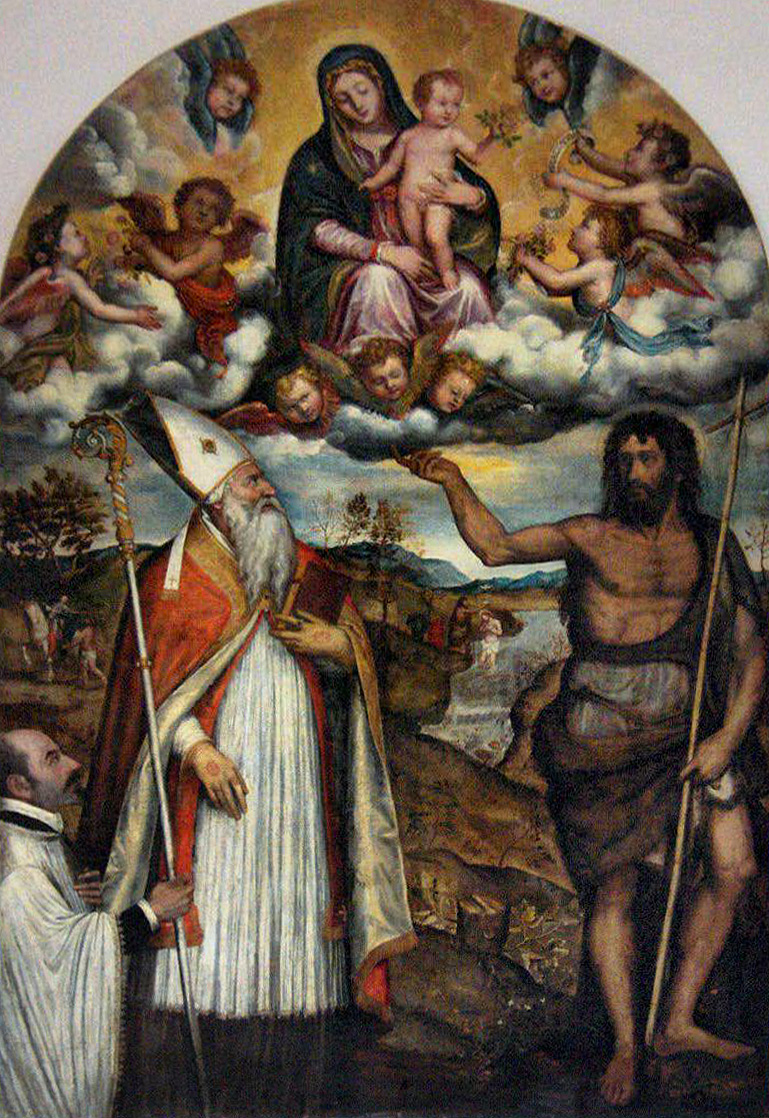
St Martin Bishop with St John the Baptist and the Virgin in Glory by Frangipane

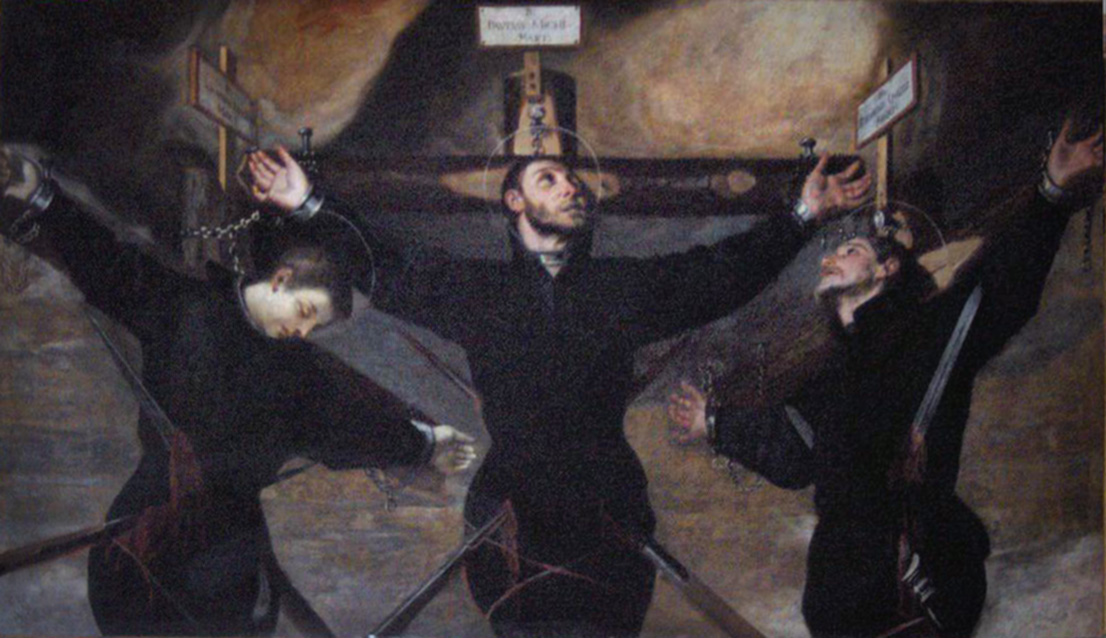
Crucified Jesuit Martyrs in Japan by Cagnacci

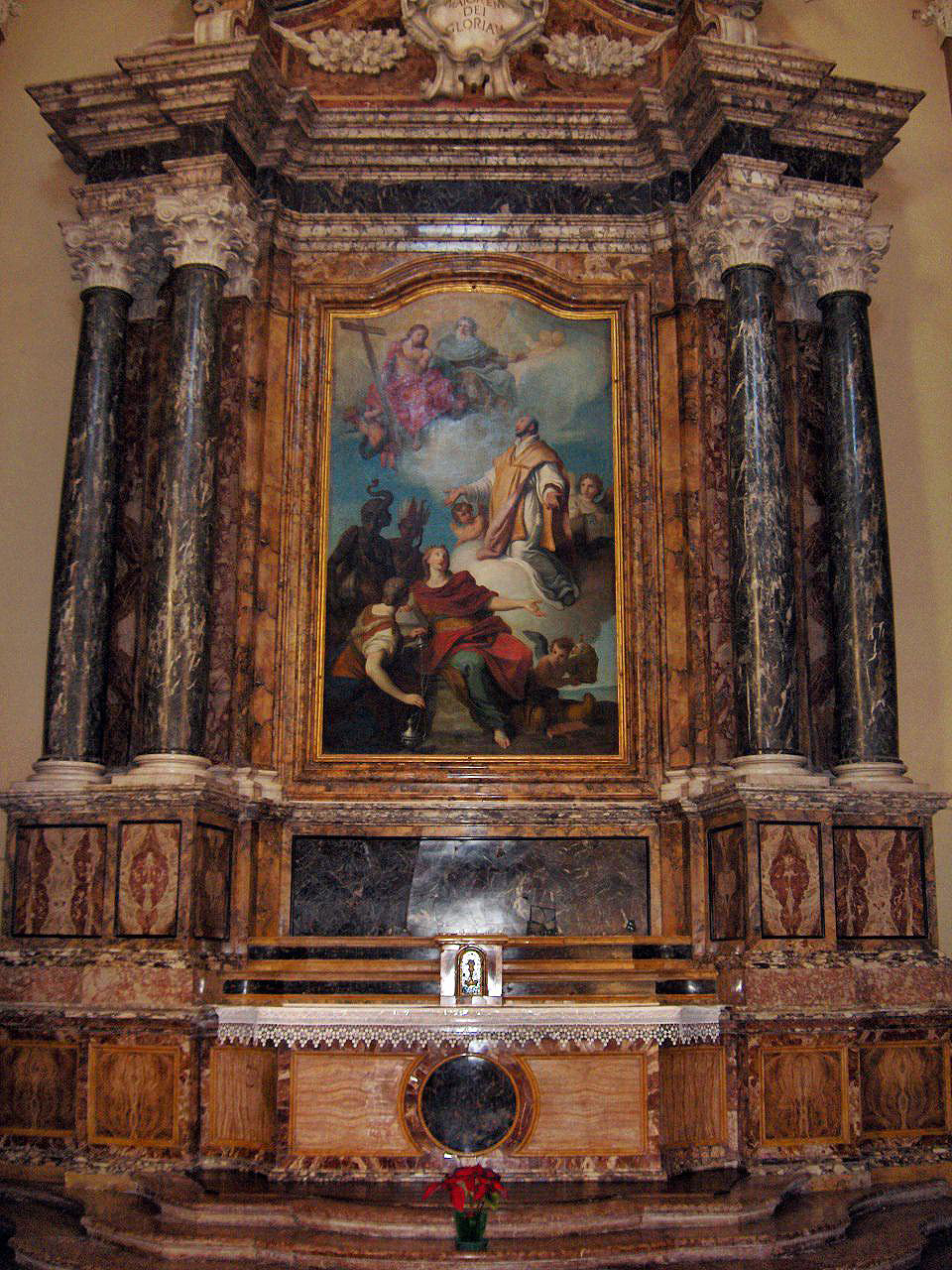
St Francis Borgia in Adoration of the Virgin by Rotari

An inventory in 1864 (also 1901) cited the following works in the church:

- St Louis Gonzaga by Andrea Barbiani
- St Martin Bishop with St John the Baptist and the Virgin in Glory by Nicolo Frangipane
- Crucified Jesuit Martyrs in Japan (including the Blessed Paulo Miki) by Guido Cagnacci, right presbytery (still in situ)
- St Nicola and the Souls of Purgatory attributed to Visacci of Urbino, 1st altar left
- St Antony (oval) by Giuseppe Soleri Brancaleoni, 1st chapel on left
- Departure from Calvary attributed to Zuccheri studio, 1st chapel on left
- Guardian Angel by Angelo Sarzetta, 1st chapel on left
- Virgin with Child, St Joseph and St Peter attributed to Antonio Puglieschi
- Marriage of the Madonna by Giovanni Battista Costa
- Deposition, by Giovanni Cesare Grazi, a copy of the work of Barocci located in Sinigallia
- Glory of St Ignatius by Pietro Rotari, altar by GF Buonamici, in transept
- St Francis Xavier Preaching in the Indies, main altar, by Vincenzo Pisanelli
- St Emidius, Patron of Rimini (1788) by GS Brancaleoni, left transept, placed after earthquake of 1786
- St Francis Borgia in Adoration of the Virgin painted by Rotari, in 1st altar right
- Annunciation, by Tuscan painter, left presbytery
- St Stanislao by Giovanni Maria delle Piane (Molinaretto), copy of GG dal Sole painting, sacristy.
- St Michael Arcangelo by Sarzetto, sacristy
- Bambino che schiaccia il Drago, by Giovanni Francesco Nagli, sacristy
