= Pietro da Rimini =

Italian painter

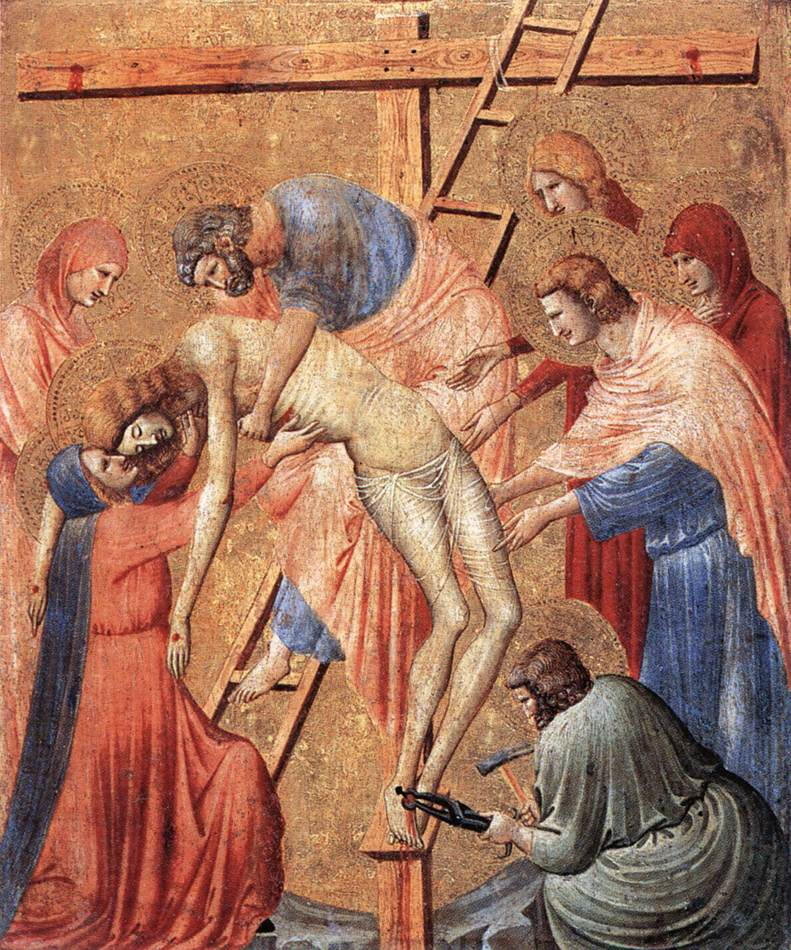
Deposition from the Cross, Louvre, Paris.

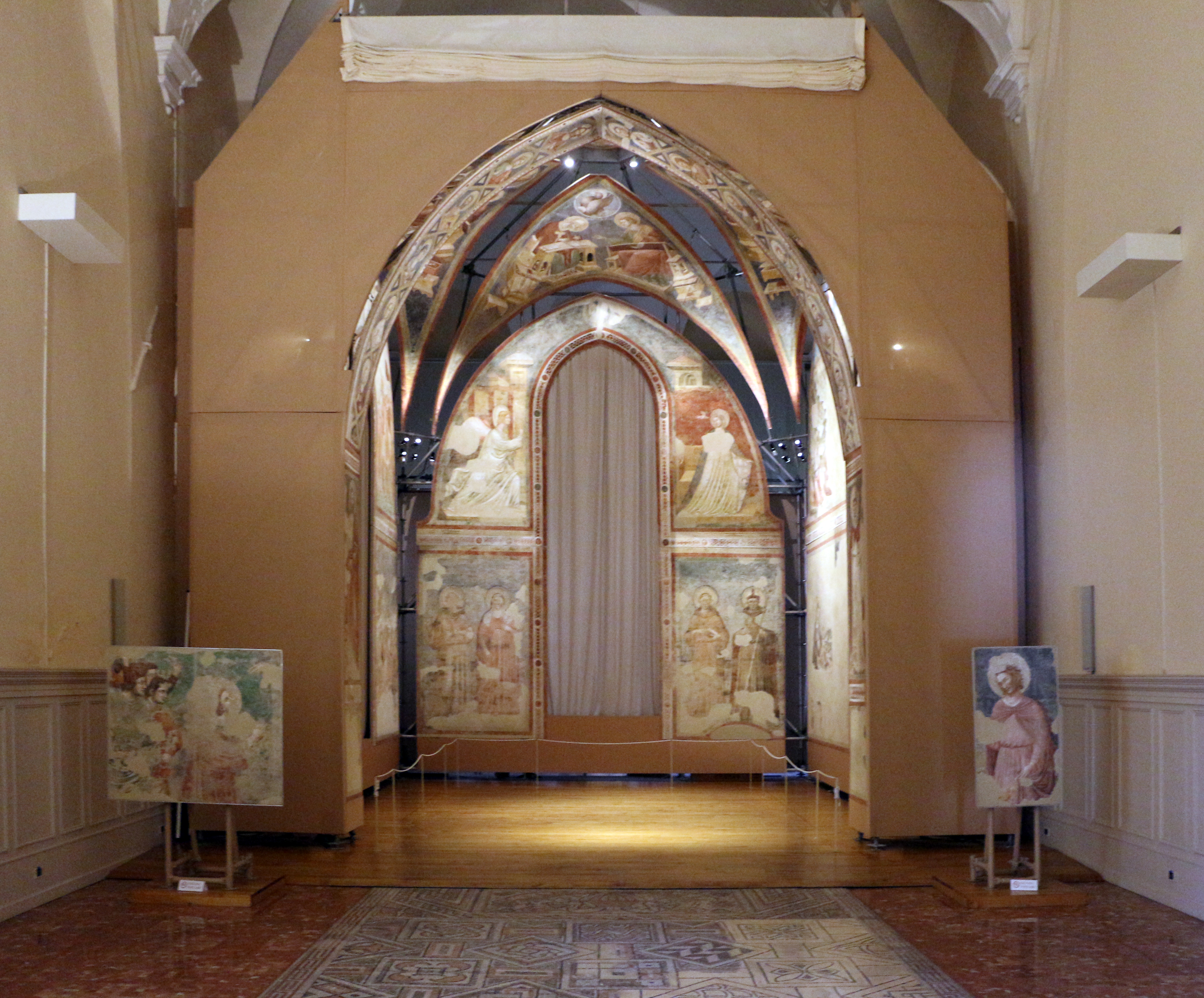
Detached Frescoes from Santa Clara, Ravenna

Pietro da Rimini (active 1315-1335) was an early 14th-century Italian painter.

== Biography ==
Pietro was born in Rimini and was a contemporary of the painters Giovanni and Giuliano da Rimini. He worked mainly in member and the Marche. Influenced by the style Giotto (who had stopped in Rimini in 1303), he was likely a member of his workshop, although this has not been confirmed. He was also influenced by the Sienese school, and in particular by Pietro Lorenzetti.

Works attributed to him, despite some remarkable differences in style, include a Deposition from the Cross at the Louvre the frescoes in the Basilica di San Nicola da Tolentino and in the refectory of the Pomposa Abbey, as well as a 1333 fresco of St. Francis in the church of Montottone.

Frescoes from a chapel in the former church of Santa Chiara in Ravenna are now in display at the National Museum of Ravenna.

He died perhaps after 1340.

== Sources ==
- Volpe, Carlo (1965). La pittura riminese del Trecento. Fratelli Fabbri.
