= Madonna della Colonnella, Rimini =

Catholic church in Rimini, Italy

Coordinates: 44°02′47.0″N 12°34′58.3″E

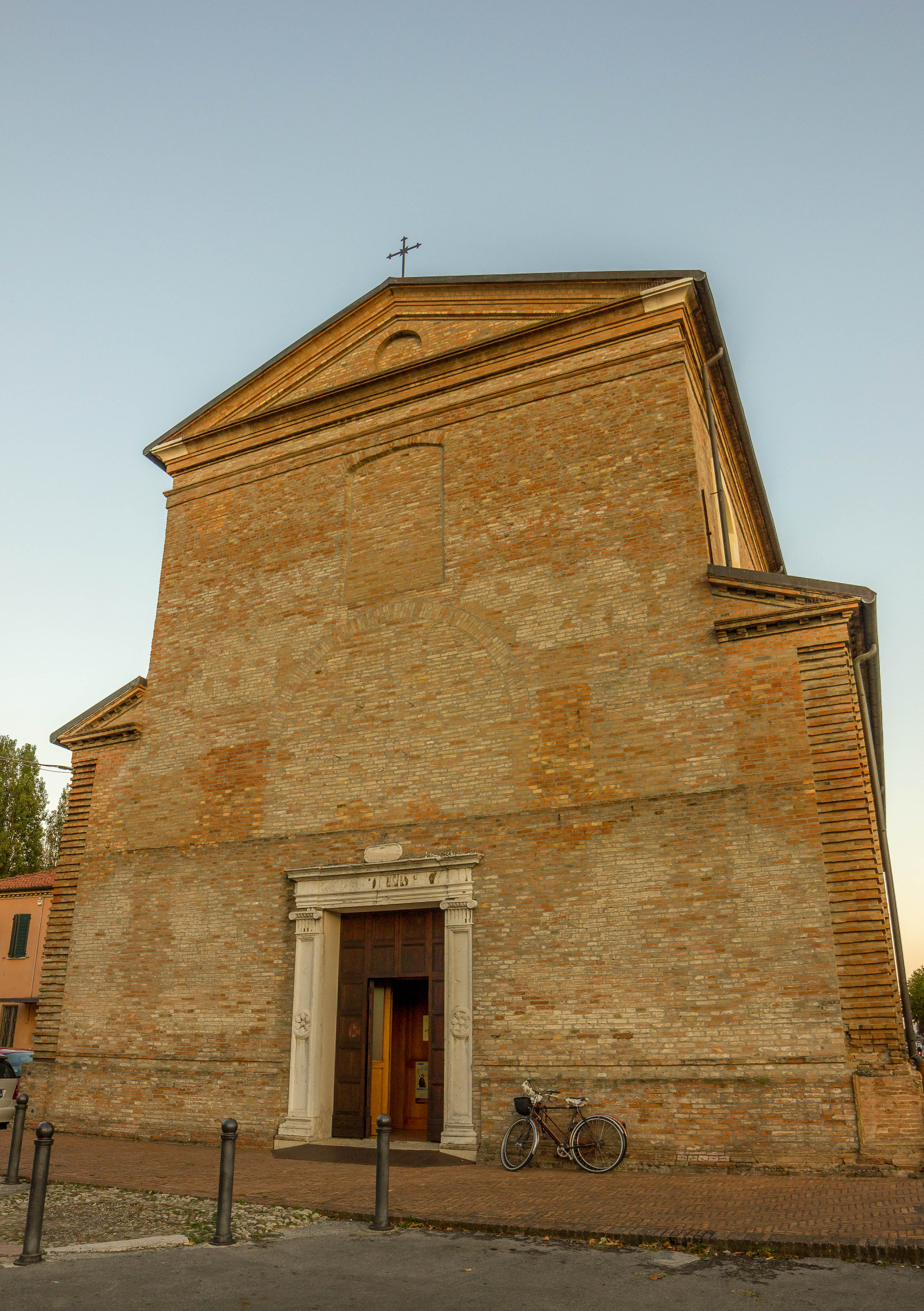
Madonna della Colonnell

Madonna della Colonnella also known as the Santa Maria Annunziata alla Colonnella is a Renaissance-style Roman Catholic church located in Via Flaminia #96 in Rimini, region of Emilia-Romagna, Italy.

== History ==
The church owes it origin to a purported miracle, occurring on May 5, 1506, attributed to the intercession of the image of the Virgin painted on a brick wall on a column located on Via Flaminia. In 1517 the church was granted to the Hieronymites (Girolamini). In 1682 it was assigned to the Third Order Regular of St. Francis, till their expulsion in 1797. Finally in 1817 it was assigned to the Cappuccini. The church suffered severe damage again during World War II.

The church was erected after 1506; the façade is plain and unfinished in brick; even a center window in the façade has been walled up with brick. This façade was rebuilt or restored after being damaged during the earthquake of 1672. The interiors have an elegant Bramantesque simplicity. The architectural design has been attributed to Giovanni Battista Guiritti or Guerriti, an artist in the circle of Melozzo da Forli. Construction appears to have continued until 1514.

An inventory of work in 1864 noted that the second chapel on the right has a Virgin and Christ Child, crowned by Angels, with Saints Francis of Assisi, John the Baptist, and the Magdalen attributed to Pellegrino Tibaldi or Guido Cagnacci. The second chapel on the left has a Deposition with the Virgin collapsed in grief, with the Magdalen, and Saints Jerome, and Francis by Claudio Ridolfi. The miraculous image of the Madonna was at the main altar. Above the orchestra seating was a canvas depiction of the Virgin, St Francis, and St Louis, King of France by Bartolomeo Cesi. The church has a modern baptismal font in bronze by Elio Morri.
