= Giovanni Laurentini =

Italian painter

Giovanni Laurentini (also called Arrigoni, active around 1600) was an Italian painter. He was a pupil of Federigo Barocci. Born in Rimini, he mostly executed large canvases including The Martyrdom of St. John as the main altarpiece for Sant'Agostino, and St. John, St. Bernardine of Siena for the Frati Minori church of San Bernardino, and St. Paul for San Paolo, Rimini.
