= Carlo Antonio Nagli =

Italian composer

- Born: c. 1680; Rimini
- Died: November 5, 1756 (aged 75–76); Venice

Carlo Antonio Nagli (c. 1680 – 5 November 1756) was an Italian composer of Baroque music who was one of a number of Italian Baroque musicians to live in Croatia. He is considered a central figure of late Baroque music of the city of Split.

== Biography ==
Born at the end of the 17th century in Rimini, Nagli completed religious and musical studies in Italy. He arrived in Dalmatia in 1707, and was named maestro di cappella of the Split Cathedral in November of the same year, which he remained until possibly 1726 and then again from 1738 to 1743. While in Dalmatia, he lived at the Franciscan monastery of the Church of St. Francis in Split, becoming guardian of the friary after 1710. He is known to have briefly been at the Franciscan monastery of Šibenik.

In 1743, Nagli returned to Italy, having accepted the role of chapelmaster of the basilica of Santa Maria Gloriosa dei Frari in Venice. He died in Venice in 1756.

== Works ==
Few of his works have been preserved. Among the preserved pieces are two masses, and four credos. The manuscripts of both masses are kept in the Bibliothèque nationale de France in Paris, while three of the credos are in the archive of the Cathedral of Saint Domnius in Split. One hymn dated 1740 to Saint Domnius, the patron saint of the city of Split, is kept today in the Split City Museum.

=== Partial list of works ===
==== Masses ====
- Messa con istrumenti a 4 concertata
- Messa con istrumenti a 4

==== Credos ====
- Inno di S. Doimo (1740)
- Inno di S. Doimo (1740)
- Responsorio (1741)
- Credo corali a una e due voci con l’organo (1747)
