= Giovanni Francesco Nagli =

Italian painter

Giovanni Francesco Nagli (c. 1615 – 1675) was an Italian painter of the Baroque period. He was a follower of the style of Simone Cantarini and later of the prominent Baroque painter Guercino, who was born in Cento in what is now Emilia-Romagna. It is perhaps for this latter reason, Nagli as follower of Guercino, is called il Centino, despite being mostly active in Rimini from 1629 onward. He painted a Sant'Agostino at his desk, now in the Pinacoteca of Rimini. He painted a saint at the gallery of Cesena. He painted a Bambino killing a Dragon at San Francesco Saverio, Rimini. He painted an altarpiece depicting St Anthony of Padua preaching to the Fish, which was once the main altarpiece of the Church of the Theatines, Rimini.
