= Girolamo Marchesi =

Italian painter

Girolamo Marchesi (c. 1471 – 1550) was an Italian painter of the Renaissance period.

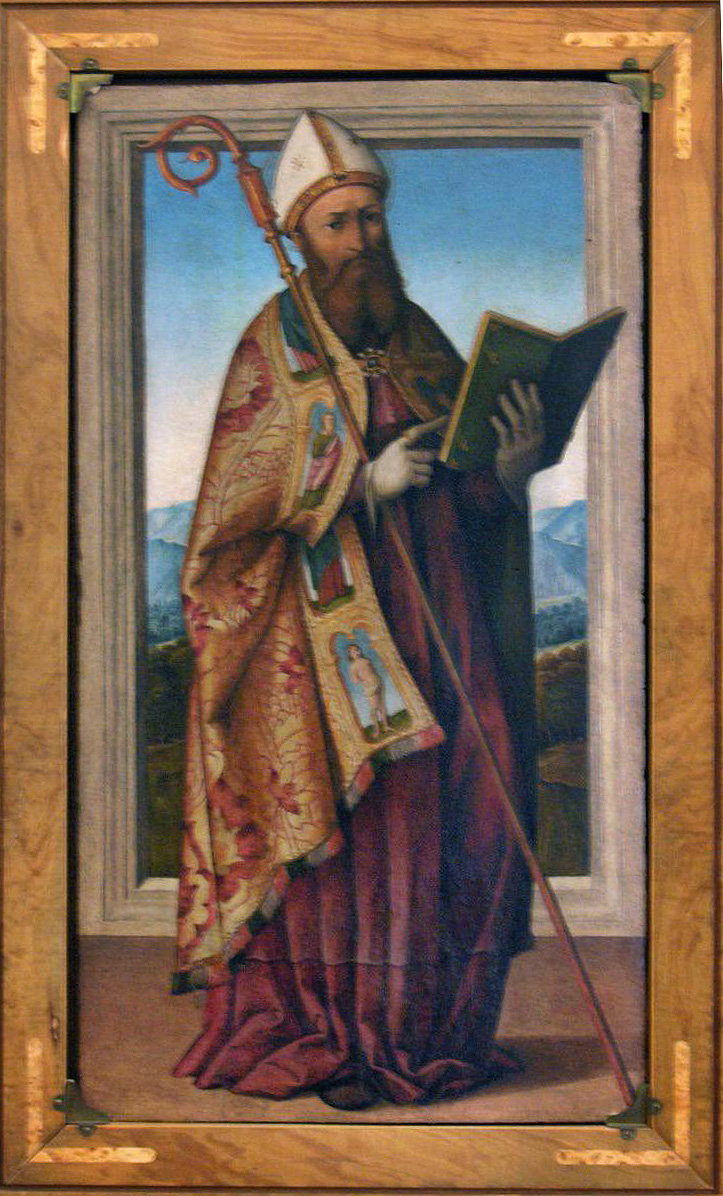
Saint Bishop City Museum, Rimini, Italy

Born in Cotignola, whence his nickname of Girolamo da Cotignola, he trained early on with Francesco Francia in Bologna, then in Rome under Raphael. He then traveled to Naples where he was patronized by the Florentine merchant Tommaso Cambi. According to Giorgio Vasari, he married a woman of ill repute there.

In Ferrara he left an Adoration of the Magi, and in the church of Santa Maria in Vado, a painting of two saints (1518). He painted with Biagio Pappini in San Michele in Bosco in Bologna. In Rimini, he painted with Benedetto Coda and Lattanzio della Marca, but the location and fate of those paintings can is unknown. He also painted in Forlì and Pesaro. In the Pinacoteca Civica di Forlì there are: La Madonna con il Bambino tra due angeli, San Mercuriale, il Battista e il committente (or Pala Orsi) and Portrait of a man. His Entombment of Christ is today part of the collections of the Palais des Beaux-Arts de Lille. In Naples, he worked in San Aniello and in Monte Oliveto.
