= Medieval archaeology =

Archaeological sub-discipline

Medieval archaeology is the study of humankind through its material culture, specialising in the period of the European Middle Ages. At its broadest, the period stretches from the 5th to the 16th century and refers to post-Roman but pre-modern remains. The period covers the upheaval caused by the Fall of the Western Roman Empire and cultures such as the Vikings, the Saxons, and the Franks. Archaeologists often specialise in studying either the Early Middle Ages (Migration Period) or the High Middle Ages and Late Middle Ages, although many projects and professionals move across these chronological boundaries. The rich nature of the medieval written record means that archaeology has often been seen as the "handmaiden to history", especially in the Late Middle Ages. Analysis of material culture may enrich or call into question written evidence from the medieval period and the two sources of evidence need to be used together. Medieval archaeology has examined the development of medieval settlements, particularly the development of medieval towns, monasteries, and castles. It has also contributed to the understanding of the spread and development of Christian monasticism during the medieval period.

== History of the study of medieval archaeology ==
In 1878, Augustus Pitt Rivers led excavations at Folkestone Castle in Kent that have been characterised as "the first ever scientific excavation of a medieval site".

The Society for Medieval Archaeology (United Kingdom) was founded in 1957. To celebrate its 50th anniversary, several publications examined the history of the society and the sub-discipline. Christopher Gerrard's 2003 book Medieval Archaeology also charts the move in the United Kingdom from antiquarianism, through Victorian medievalism, on to the emergence of medieval archaeology as a sub-discipline in the 20th century. Michel de Boüard, the University of Caen, Ecole pratique des Hautes Etudes, and the Polish Academy of Sciences were instrumental in establishing medieval archaeology as a field in France in the second half of the 20th century.

== Areas of expertise ==
The study of medieval archaeology often focuses on specific kinds of settlement pattern. It is the combination of material culture, historical data, and archaeological data in order to decipher transitions through the medieval ages. To gain a better understanding and grasp of daily life, urban settlement development, and social structure. Before the 20th century, medieval archaeology, and its history, was not a very popular topic of conversation. It was topic many knew little about, to the point where the surface level of settlements, hierarchy, and social status in the medieval ages were barley scratched. Methods such as excavation and landscape surveyal, with an emphasized use of LiDAR data, are just some of the methods archaeologists use to uncover medieval remains of settlements. Artifacts found during excavations and field surveys can help medieval life be more understood, when looked at through material culture. In order to understand who lived in these settlements, why they did, and for how long, archaeologists use pottery, settlement remains, written and pictoral sources to uncover a rough outline of events. Radiocarbon dating is a main source in determining the age of certain organic materials (e.g. charcoal, textiles, bones, etc).

=== Rural settlements and landscapes ===
Pattern of medieval rural settlements are often quite different from modern time villages. This is true in terms of architecture, outline of the settlements and social structure. During the medieval ages, there were a wide variety of settlements. Settlements with the inclusion of farm houses, both individual and group, town homes, and large solidified villages. The majority of settlements were divided based on the needs of the dwellers. Areas with opportunities for grazing and close vicinity to water (e.g. moats, rivers, etc), were found to be hotspots for settlement. Medieval villages were located closely together to form a unity. Whereas farms, and other agricultural centered settlements (e.g. hamlets), would be on the outskirts of the settled land. Committing to a more solitude form of life due to the needs of, said, dwellers. Needs of the agricultural settlements, farms and ranches, include vast space for livestock and cattle farms.

=== Towns and Urbanism ===
There is a broad spectrum of pre-urban and urban settlements in the Middle Ages (e.g. early medieval trading places at the Northern Sea and the Baltic Sea, former Roman cities and town foundations of the late Middle Ages).

An important field of research is urban archaeology in still existing towns, which is determined by rescue archaeology.

=== Castles and Hierarchy ===
In the early days of the medieval ages, the structural integrity of castles was still finding its footing. Made up of two main parts, the motte and the bailey, and being made with timber and wood. With the timber and wood architecture, castles were prone to wood rotting and catastrophic damage during fire attacks. To counter this, architects began to experiment with more stable building material (e.g. brick, stone, etc). In the beginning, castles were built for military use serving as a place for military presence. They were placed in locations with the most land advantage (e.g. cliffs, hills, etc) in preparation for possible attacks. Castles had the tendency to include a moat around the perimeter of the castle. The moat acted as a, sort of, buffer between the castle and the enemy. Castles were also a representation of justice and government systems. In the later eras of the medieval ages, the symbolism of castles started its shift.

The original meaning of castles began to evolve into what we recognize it as today, during the 11th century. With the original use of military advantage and judicial symbol, castles became a symbol of wealth, status, and nobility.

A reconstruction of Holt Castle in 1495

=== Church and monastic archaeology ===
In the United Kingdom, the Dissolution of the Monasteries left many monastic sites abandoned. Where monasteries have survived or been converted for other uses, "buildings archaeology" has also been applied to study their history. Medieval monasteries often held large estates and the study of monastic landscapes is an area of specialised research. There have been two main waves of research in medieval monastic and church archaeology: 1970-1995 and 1995-present. The first wave was influenced by landscape history and processual archaeology; Scholarship focused principally on historical, economic and technological questions and targeted individual sites and monuments for study. The second wave has been informed by post-processual approaches and considers change and complexity in religious landscapes and perspectives on religious space, embodiment and agency.

== See also ==
- Medieval Bioarchaeology
