= Division (architecture) =

Method of architectural composition

A variety of divisions on the facade of the Banqueting House

In architecture, division is the way to partition a building or its façade by vertical or horizontal lines. The division can be manifested by variations in projection or height, or marked upon the wall surfaces by pilasters, buttresses, string courses, and cornices. Both horizontal and vertical lines enter into the composition, whether its masses are tall and narrow or broad, flat, and level.

== Major and minor divisions ==
Major divisions may contain smaller or minor subdivisions. William Harrison Varnum uses the latter term for parts subordinated in size to the larger divisions, and notes that the same design rules generally apply to both. Coupled columns, for example, may divide a storey into three parts, with single columns dividing the middle part into three again.

== Vertical divisions ==
The parts of a building are distinguished by a difference in projection, producing a vertical line of shadow, or by a difference in height, or by both. Pilasters, buttresses, and engaged columns provide further vertical lines of separation.

John Beverley Robinson calls the principal parts of a front its primary masses, their connecting portions links, and the subordinate portions at the sides appendages. The pylons of an Egyptian temple, the twin towers of a church, and the two pavilions of a courthouse exemplify two masses joined into a single whole. In a group of three, the central mass may predominate in size and differ in treatment from the sides.

An arrangement of doors and windows may suggest the same composition upon a flat wall. A doorway may constitute the principal object, with windows on each side taking the place of appendages. Larger windows may be connected by smaller ones; openings in several storeys may be combined into large arched groups.

Pilasters, buttresses, and vertical lines of quoin stones divide a wall into minor parts: it is the parts which count in the composition rather than the dividing lines. Such details also accentuate the outlines of towers and pavilions.

Varnum relates the apparent height of Gothic cathedrals to the repetition of upright lines in their buttresses, pinnacles, and spires. Dividing a broad surface vertically also relieves its monotony. In his three-part arrangement, the main building holds its two smaller wings together, while their equal size gives balance.

== Horizontal divisions ==
Horizontal division may be obtained by the advance and retreat of different parts—setting back or overhanging the upper storeys—or by drawing lines of demarcation upon the wall surface. Towers and spires built in diminishing stages exemplify the first method, as do porticoes, verandas, and arcades advancing in front of the main wall.

=== Cornices and bands ===
The ordinary method of drawing horizontal lines is by mouldings. From the designer's standpoint, a moulding draws a black brush mark across the face of the wall. An undercut helps to shed water and intensifies the shadow. A frieze or dado may form a band of ornament alone, or in connection with mouldings which strengthen its effect.

Repetition gives an impression of uninterrupted continuity, as in dentils and modillions. Crenellations, balustrades, or a line of windows tied together by ornament may take the place of a moulding. In tall buildings, a whole storey bounded by cornices may serve as a line separating the base from the shaft, or the shaft from the upper part.

In Varnum's account, the ground supplies the architect's first horizontal line. Mouldings and long bands of coloured brick cross the front parallel to this base line, binding its parts together. Such divisions tend to make a building or room appear longer.

=== Arrangement and proportion ===
Between base and cornice, the wall may remain undivided or be cut up into two or three principal parts. The Banqueting House at Whitehall has two substantially equal divisions. At St. Peter's Basilica, the order below is much greater than the attic above. The Palazzo Strozzi exemplifies division into three equal parts.

Of three unequal divisions, Robinson takes the usual type to be that in which the middle part is considerably the largest. This is analogous to a column's base, shaft, and capital, or the pedestal, column, and entablature of a classical order. A tall building's base, shaft, and frieze follow the same arrangement.

Varnum's rule for two horizontal divisions gives the greater height to either the upper or the lower part. In three divisions he gives dominance to the middle, with unequal heights above and below. He regards the larger middle portion as holding the smaller divisions together.

Minor divisions may be subordinated to two or three principal parts. A narrow intermediate band may form a frieze to the part below or a base to that above. In the Doge's Palace at Venice, the two lower storeys are thrown together by their similar arched treatment and distinguished from the flat, unbroken wall above: a double division with its lower part divided again.

In towers, pagodas, and tall office buildings, horizontal mouldings may cut the middle portion into a series of uniform slices, piled one on top of another, between a base and a crowning part.

A visible roof makes a natural division into wall below and roof above. It may crown a two- or three-part composition, or receive separate treatment while the wall surface is composed independently.

== See also ==
- Articulation (architecture)
- Bay (architecture)
- Axis (architecture) – German-language article on architectural axes
