= Tancarville family =

Arms of the Chamberlains de Normandie - Armorial général de France. "Gules an inescutcheon argent in orle eight estoiles (stars, or engemes, or leaves of meslier) d'or"

The "family of Tancarville" was of Norman stock, of likely Scandinavian descent, originating in the Pays de Caux, from that of the Viking Tancredus (fr. Tancrède), companion of Rollo, in the conquest of northern France. Tancrède's progeny remaining closely tied to the royal family, becoming the hereditary Chamberlains of Normandie and of England, as well as many other crown offices. This family was known as "in the highest ranks of the Anglo-Norman aristocracy, the lords of Tancarville".

== History of the family ==
The Normans, or Norsemen, raided the shores of England and France, from their homes in Scandinavia. The most prominent of these Norsemen was Hrólf, the Viking. whose name was Latinized to "Rollo" ... Tancredus was with Hrólf and his followers, when they seized in northern France, the area that would become "Normandie". Their possession of these lands were formalized, by the 'Treaty of St Clair-sur-Epte', between Charles III of France and Rollo, in the year 911.

- Tancredus/Tancrède (c.890*-) His parentage is unknown. One of the foremost of the Viking's with Hrólf, was that of Tancrède, and being with Rollo at St. Clair-sur-Epte, and receiving his reward of the land of and surrounding what was to become Tancarville, settled there, and eventually was built, at the westernmost extremity of his demesne, on the first promontory guarding the mouth of the Seine, a fortified Castle. Tancred's property was an "allodium", signifying absolute ownership, as contrasted with a "fief", lands held subject to the King or another Noble. From the numerous charters and recorded events of his family, it suggests that Tancreds' properties may have stretched, even at this early date, substantially east from the River Seine. The properties at Boscherville and Roumare, both being very near Rouen.

* It is not known exactly when Tancrède was born, or when he joined with the followers of Rollo, in the raids on the French. Rollo is recorded as having been the leader in these raids, as early as the year 885. Tancrèdes' estimated birth of c. 890, is based on that he was likely "at least of age", when he is first found recorded in 911/12. He could easily have been born earlier.

The name of Tancarville does not appear until the early twelfth century, first shown in a charter for Henry I in 1103, among the barons who are mentioned as witnesses is Raoul's son, "Willelmus de Tancarvilla". It was only after this that the name of Tancarville is used and the castle appeared for the time in texts. Prior to this, the family members would have been styled: de la Ville Tancrède or Tancardi Villa.

- Rabel I de la Ville Tancrède (c. 915-) Tancreds' son Rabel I, left his name to Rabel's Isle and Rabel's foss, mentioned in early records. His wife is not known.

A simple Germanic definition for the name Tancred is "Wise Counsel", and for Rabel is "Advice" or "Counsel".

Tancreds' lands are first shown for him in 912 and it is likely that not much more than the Manor House (la Ancien Manoir) and some, if not all of the structure(s) along the length of Rabel's Fossé, existed in the first two generations.

- Geraldus I de la Ville Tancrède (c. 940-) Very little is known about Rabels' son Geraldus (I), other than he was Baron apparently towards the end of the 10th century.
- Rabel II de la Ville Tancrède (c.965-) Son of Gerald I. His wife is not known.
- Geraldus II de la Ville Tancrède (c.990-aft. 1066) "le Dapifer de Normandie et Châtelain de Neufmarché". Son of Rabel II. The Brevis Relatio records that "Geraldo dapifero" contributed 40 ships towards the invasion of England in 1066. A charter of Duke William c. 1061/66, records that the Castle at Neufmarché was granted to "Geroldo dapifero". Gerald's wife was Hélisende. It has been suggested that Hélisende may have been an heiress to a d'Abbetot seigneur, and that she brought the fief and church of Saint-Jean-d'Abbetot into the family via franc marriage. Geraldus and a kinsman (likely his son Giraldus "miles Christi" de Roumare), made a grant to the college at St-Georges, at a time before Raoul made his own grant c. 1035, and confirmed that of his father.

- Raoul I FitzGerald le Chamberlain de la Ville Tancrède (c. 1008-c. 1080*) "le Chief Chamberlain et le Magister de la duc de Normandie". Raoul was the son of Gerald II and Hélisende. The earliest recorded use of the patronymic "FitzGerald", is that of Raoul fitz Gerald le Chamberlain, a Norman baron, educator of the young William, future Conqueror of England. Raoul is recorded as an officer of William's father, Duke Robert the Magnificent, whose fleet he commands in 1029, and being of the trusted few, and infamous in knightly accomplishments, the young duke William is placed in the Chamberlain's household, shortly after 1040, for his protection and education in the skills of knighthood. Raoul married Avicia Stigand de Mézidon, the likely niece of Odonis Stigandus.

In the 11th century, the Chamberlain's family, headed by Raoul FitzGerald, having held the honor of Tancardi Villa for well over 100 years at this point, apparently divided his time between the château fort thereon, with his father Geraldus II, and that of their Boscherville mansion at St-Georges. Raoul is recorded as having updated both the château fort and the church at St-Georges in circa 1050.

"... In the quite numerous acts where Raoul Chamberlain, who extended his career until about the year 1080 is mentioned, the name of Tancarville is never attached to his. Raoul is simply referred to by his title, or his parentage; He is Raoul le Chamberlain or Raoul fitz Gerald ..."

* Raoul, "commanding the fleet" in 1029, would suggest he must have been "of age" by this point ... A charter giving the Church of Mireville to Jumièges shows that he was living in 1079.

- Guillaume I de Tancarville (-1129) "le Chamberlain de Normandie et England". Son of Raoul and Avice. Guillaume was the first to use the Tancarville name. He founded the Abbey of Saint-Georges de Boscherville c. 1112/13, which replaces the college founded by his grandfather and father. Through his sponsorship, it attracted a large number of donations, including that of King Henry I, who gave him the port of Bénouville. He married Mathilde d'Arques b. 1083 in Arques la Bataille, Normandie, France, heiress of another powerful family, daughter of Guillaume d'Arques and Beatrice Malet.

It seems certain that he is the chamberlain of Duke Robert Courthose and his brother Henry Beauclerc, after his victory at the Battle of Tinchebray (1106). He was a close adviser to King Henry I of England. He was a frequent witness to his actions, and also performed the function of judge. Considered a lord permanently loyal to the king by Orderic Vitalis, he was at his side at the siege of the Chateau d'Eu in 1089. He participated in the Battle of Bremule (1119) alongside the king of England against the king of France during a chance meeting in the Vexin.

According to Henry of Huntingdon, it was he who commanded the rebel force that captured Galeran IV Meulan Bourgtheroulde in 1124. However, the Norman chronicler Orderic Vitalis did not mention this in his account of this event.

- Rabel de Tancarville (c. 1080-1140) "le Chamberlain de Normandie et England". Son of Guillaume I and Maude d'Arques. Rabel de Tancarville remained the only chamberlain-in-chief of Normandy and England until Henri I of England created a separate hereditary office for England in 1133 and entrusted it to Aubrey (II) of Vere and his heirs. Rabel's first wife was Tiphaine de Penthièvre, daughter of Etienne de Bretagne Comte de Penthièvre and his wife Havise de Guingamp. The name of Rabel's second wife has not been discovered. Rabel and Tiphaine had a daughter:

- Olive de Tancarville.

Rabel and his second wife had a son:

- Guillaume II de Tancarville (-1190/91) "Chamberlain de Normandie". Son of Rabel and his second wife, trained and knighted his kinsman William Marshal. The name of Guillaume’s wife is not known. Guillaume II & his wife had three children:

- Raoul II de Tancarville (-before 1204) "Chamberlain de Tancarville".

- Guillaume III de Tancarville (-after 1214).

- Marsilie de Tancarville (-after 1205).

- Giroldus "miles Christi" de la Ville Tancrède (c. 1015-aft. 1066) "Seigneur de Roumare, le Seneschal de Normandie et Châtelain de Neufmarché" Son of Geraldus II and Hélisende. Gerold is shown to have had two wives, Alberada or Aubreye and Emiciæ or Amicia, the parentage for both is not known.

* Roger FitzGerold de Roumare (abt. 1062 - bef. 1098) "Baron of Kendall, Lord of Bolingbroke et Châtelain de Neufmarché" Son of Gerold and Alberada. He married Lucia (Mercia) Taillebois in 1093, as her second husband.

* William (I) de Roumare (abt. 1096-31 May 1160) "2nd Baron of Kendal, Earl of Lincoln and Cambridge, Lord of Roumare & Bolingbroke, Châtelain de Neufmarché" Son of Roger FitzGerold and Countess Lucy. He married Hawise Reviers in 1117.

- Almericus de la Ville Tancrède (c. 1015-aft. 1066) "Aumary le Seigneur d'Abbetot". Son of Geraldus II and Hélisende. Aumary is described as a "cadet" (younger son), of the family, when he inherited the fief of Saint-Jean-d'Abbetot, in the forest of Roumare.

* Urso "the Bear" d'Abbetot (c. 1040-c. 1108) "Vicecomes de Worcestria, Baron de Salwarpe et Elmley, Châtelain de Worcestria". Son of Almericus. Round states that he was son of Almericus and that he came in with the Conqueror and was made Sheriff of Worcestershire. Urse oversaw the construction of Worcester Castle, completed in 1069.

* Robert d'Abbetot le Despenser (c. 1045-c. 1097) "Robert the Bursar, Lord of Scrvelsby". Son of Almericus. Robert was Royal Steward to king William I & William II. He was the brother of Urse d'Abetot, sheriff of Worcestershire, "who succeeded the former in his lands in Lincolnshire". Robert was a benefactor to the Priory of St. Barbe-en-Auge, which had been founded by the Lords Tancarville. He oversaw the construction of Elmley Castle in Worcestershire and likely spent his last days there.

* Osbert d'Abbetot (c. 1050-aft. 1114) "Vicecomiti de Wirecestrasera". Son of Almericus.

Although the Tancarville are close to power, they have very little land in England. For Kathleen Thompson, it is because they are part of the Normans who "find no interest in the English affair". On the other hand, they hold ninety fiefs in Normandy.

Around 1316, the house of Melun, by Jean Ier, Viscount de Melun and lord of Montreuil-Bellay, allied itself with the Tancarville, of which Jeanne de Tancarville was the last heiress.

== Coat of arms ==
=== "Gules an inescutcheon argent in orle eight cinquefoils d'or" ===
The first coat of arms met with for this family, as found in the Armorial général de France, described as the "Arms of the Chamberlains de Normandie"

=== "Gules an inescutcheon argent in orle eight estoiles or" ===
From the "Histoire du château et des sires de Tancarville", we find these arms shown, but with no clue as to who may have borne them, or if the charges in orle represent "mackles" (the rowel of a spur), or "estoiles" (a star).

=== "Gules an inescutcheon argent in orle eight mackles or" ===
Arms taken from the seal of Sir William de Tancarville V c. 1283 - from the "Histoire du château et des sires de Tancarville"

=== "Gules an inescutcheon argent in orle eight mackles pierced or" ===
Seal of Lord Robert de Tancarville c. 1297 - Again from the "Histoire du château et des sires de Tancarville" - The Mackle, described as the "Rowel of a Spur", fits appropriately for this family, infamous in its Knightly accomplishments.

..

== Tancarville Castle ==
- le Château Fort de la Ville Tancrède:

"A first castle was founded for a lord named Tancredi who gave his name to the castle fort built on a spur overlooking the Seine to Raoul de Tancarville, Chamberlain of William the Conqueror in the 11th century".

Raoul fortified the castle substantially, with massive walls all around (6 to 18 feet thick), and adding "le Tour Carrée" (the Square Tower), "le Chambre Aux Chevaliers" (the Knights Chamber), and much more, transforming it into one of the most respected Château Forts in the Pays de Caux and beyond.

"From the beginning of the 12th century, Tancarville castle was the seat of one of the most powerful lineages of the Pays de Caux during the ducal epoch, in that of the Chamberlains of Normandy. This family, grand officers of the crown, were already landowners in the Lillebonne region towards the middle of the 11th century ..."

The castle was located on the extremity of a triangular spur, detached from the hillsides of the Seine. A large deep ditch separated it from the plateau. From the ducal epoch remains an enormous motte* with the ruins of a large 15th-century tower (the "Grosse-tour"), possibly some parts of masonry visible in the toothing stones at the south-eastern angle of the tower, and finally an imposing 12th-century residential tower known as the "Tour-carrée" (square tower), which stands at the north-western angle of the enceinte. Looking at the rest of the ensemble, the essential medieval sections are of reconstruction from the end of the 14th and beginning of the 15th centuries. - Jacques Le Maho

Bibliography - A Deville, Histoire du château et des sires de Tancarville, Rouen, 1834; J. Mesqui, Châteaux-forts et fortifications en France, Paris, 1997, p. 370-372.

* "remains an enormous motte", Rabel's Fossé, The huge Fossé can be seen in the plot plan above, on the right, between the structures and le Boulevard Coquésant ...

- The Counts of Tancarville: by J.R. Planché

No identification of this noble Norman has yet been made by any of the commentators on the "Roman de Rou," in which alone we find such a personage included in the list of the followers of the Duke of Normandy. Mr. Taylor says, "M. le Prévost rather inconclusively observes that Ralph, William's guardian, was too old and his children too young to be engaged," and adds, "Ralph's age is hardly itself a competent contradiction to Wace's statement; for his charter giving the Church of Mireville to Jumièges shows that he was living in 1079. William, his son and successor as Chamberlain, so appears in 1082." I certainly do not share the opinion of Le Prévost, and am at a loss to know where he found that Ralph, the Chamberlain of Tancarville, was guardian to Duke William. I have just mentioned this Ralph as the supposed brother of Gerold de Roumare and uncle of the William de Roumare I believe to have been at Hastings. Ralph was hereditary chamberlain of Normandy; but which of his family had first exercised that office is at present unknown.

The small Church of St. George, in the village of that name in the forest of Roumare, first endowed by Duke William, was subsequently rebuilt by Ralph, who is styled by the Duke in his charter of confirmation, "Meus magister Aulaque et Camera mea princeps." ("My major-domo or master of the household and first chamberlain.") Ralph also had the church re-decorated, and confirmed the grant which his father, Geraldus, and his brothers had given to St. George. A brother of Ralph, named Giraldus, was also an officer of William's household; and it was "Coram Giraldo Dapifer meo" that William, while yet Duke of the Normans, ratified a convention between Hugh de Pavilly and the Canons of St. George, the witnesses being the same Giraldus and Robert his son.

Now we have here two Gerolds, one who simply styles himself "a soldier of Christ," and the other the Dapifer (steward or seneschal) of William, King of the English. We also find one of these Gerolds rejoicing in two wives, named Albreda and Emicia, and who has a son, Robert, by the first. The other Gerold had a wife named Helisendis. Whether they were both Gerolds of Roumare; how they were connected; which was the father of Roger de Roumare, and which of Ralph the Chamberlain, has yet to be distinctly proved. The names of Gerald, Robert, Ralph, and William were much too common at that period to be of themselves sufficient identification; but that the chamberlain of Tancarville or Tankerville mentioned by Wace was Ralph, the son of Gerold and father of William the Chamberlain, I think cannot reasonably be doubted.

- Paintings of the Square Tower
- Armorial général de France for le Chamberlains de Tancarville:
'Gules an escutcheon argent an orle of eight cinquefoils or'
- Histoire du château et des sires de Tancarville:
'"Gules an escutcheon argent in orle eight mackles or"'

=== Hereditary Chamberlains ===
In the eleventh century, it was a stronghold lordship which depended Raoul de Tancarville, guardian of Duke William the Conqueror, future king of England. The fact that Raoul was chamberlain of Normandy, and this function has remained in the family, reinforces a simple corroboration of the hereditary nature of this title. The seal shown here is for Robert de Tancarville le Chamberlain, almost 300 years later.

- Histoire du château et des sires de Tancarville
- The Chamberlain Family ... Ancient & Early Connections by Ian Chamberlain

"Known as ‘William the Bastard’ to his contemporaries, his illegitimacy shaped his career when he was young. As a youth he was placed—apparently a common practice in Norse society—for his protection and education in the skills of knighthood, under the guardianship of the Tancarville family living near the river Seine in Normandy. It is from this role that members of the Tancarville family took the name ‘Chamberlain’ and continued to manage the affairs of William and his heir's beyond his invasion of England through several generations."

=== le Abbaye Saint-Georges de Boscherville ===
Guillaume chamberlain confirmed the donation to the abbey of St Georges de Bocherville by Raoul, chief chamberlain of William I King of England, and his sons Raoul, Nigel and Guillaume, and their mother Avicia, with the consent of his sons Rabel and Robert and Lucy, recorded in a charter of Henry I King of England dated 1114.

The small Church of St. George, in the village of that name in the forest of Roumare ... was rebuilt by Ralph, who is styled by the Duke in his charter of confirmation, "Meus magister Aulaque et Camera mea princeps".... Ralph also had the church re-decorated, and confirmed the grant which his father, Geraldus, and his brothers had given to St. George. Ralph's brother, Giraldus (de Roumare), was also an officer of William's household; and it was "Coram Giraldo Dapifer meo" that William, while yet Duke of the Normans, ratified a convention between Hugh de Pavilly and the Canons of St. George, the witnesses being the same Giraldus and Robert his son.

- "Recherches sur le Domesday" under d'Abetot :

Aumary d'Abetot, an appellation derived from the lands of St. Jean d'Abetot, canton of Calbose, arrondissement of Havre, the lordship of which belonged to the family of Tancarville, as appears from the charter of formation of the college of St. George de Bosherville, to which Ralph Fitz Gerald, in 1050, gave the church and tithes of Abetot for the support of the monks of that college, which was made an abbey in 1124.

This Ralph Fitz Gerald, who is the Chamberlain of Tancarville, was the elder brother of Aumary d'Abetot. Their father being the Gerold who was the husband of Helisendis (not Gerold of Roumare, husband of Albreda), and who probably, as Sire de Tankerville, held the hereditary office of chamberlain to the Dukes of Normandy, which we find his son Ralph and his grandson William enjoying in succession*.

* This succession of holding the hereditary office of chamberlain has been shown to have lasted over 300 years, well over this if the speculation recorded in the Recherches sur le Domesday, as shown above, that Geraldus was also chamberlain.

=== le Abbaye Sainte-Barbe-en-Auge ===
"Rabel fils de Guillaume, chambellan de Tancarville, qui avait épousé Agnès, héritière des biens du fondateur de ce prieuré" confirmed the foundation of the priory of Sainte-Barbe and its possession of all its lands "de la Dive", by charter dated 1128

Henry I King of England confirmed an earlier donation to the abbey of Sainte-Barbe by "Odo Stigandus", at the request of "Guillelmi camerarii de Tancarvilla [...nepos supradicti Odonis Stigandi] et Rabelli filii sui", by charter dated 1129

Henry II King of England confirmed the possessions of the priory of Sainte-Barbe-en-Auge, including donations by "Rabelli Camerarii...Willelmus camerarius pater eius...Willelmi Camerarii filii Rabelli", by charter dated to 1185/89.

"Guillaume Chambellan de Tancarville" donated land "à Iz" to the priory of Sainte-Barbe, at the request of "Alix sa femme", by undated charter witnessed by "Guillaume de Séran, frère de la dite Alix".

== Sources ==
- Des Forts, Philippe - Ministère de la Culture France - Tancarville Castle - le Château Fort de la Ville Tancrède
- Washburn Family Foundations in Normandy, England and America, by Mabel Thacher Rosemary Washburn ... Washburn Family Foundations
- The Chamberlain Family - Ancient & Early Connections by Ian Chamberlain
- Orderic Vitalis (Prévost), Vol. II, Liber III, p. 104.
- Extrait de la Chronique de Normandie, RHGF XIII, p. 236.
- Round (1899) 196, p. 66.
- Brevis Relatio de Origine Willelmi Conquestoris, p. 22
- Regesta Regem Anglo-Normannorum (1956), Vol. II, Appendix, CCXVI, p. 364.
- The Battle Abbey Roll with Some Accounts of the Norman Lineages, by Duchess of Cleveland, publ. 1889 by John Murray, London, England. - BATTLE ABBEY ROLL
- Châteaux-forts et fortifications en France, Paris, 1997, p. 370-372 by J. Mesqui.
- Histoire du château et des sires de Tancarville" by Achille Deville, N. Périaux,1834. - HISTOIRE de TANCARVILLE
- History of the abbey of Mont Sainte-Catherine, pages 19 and 75.
