= Toothing stones =

Projecting masonry left for later construction

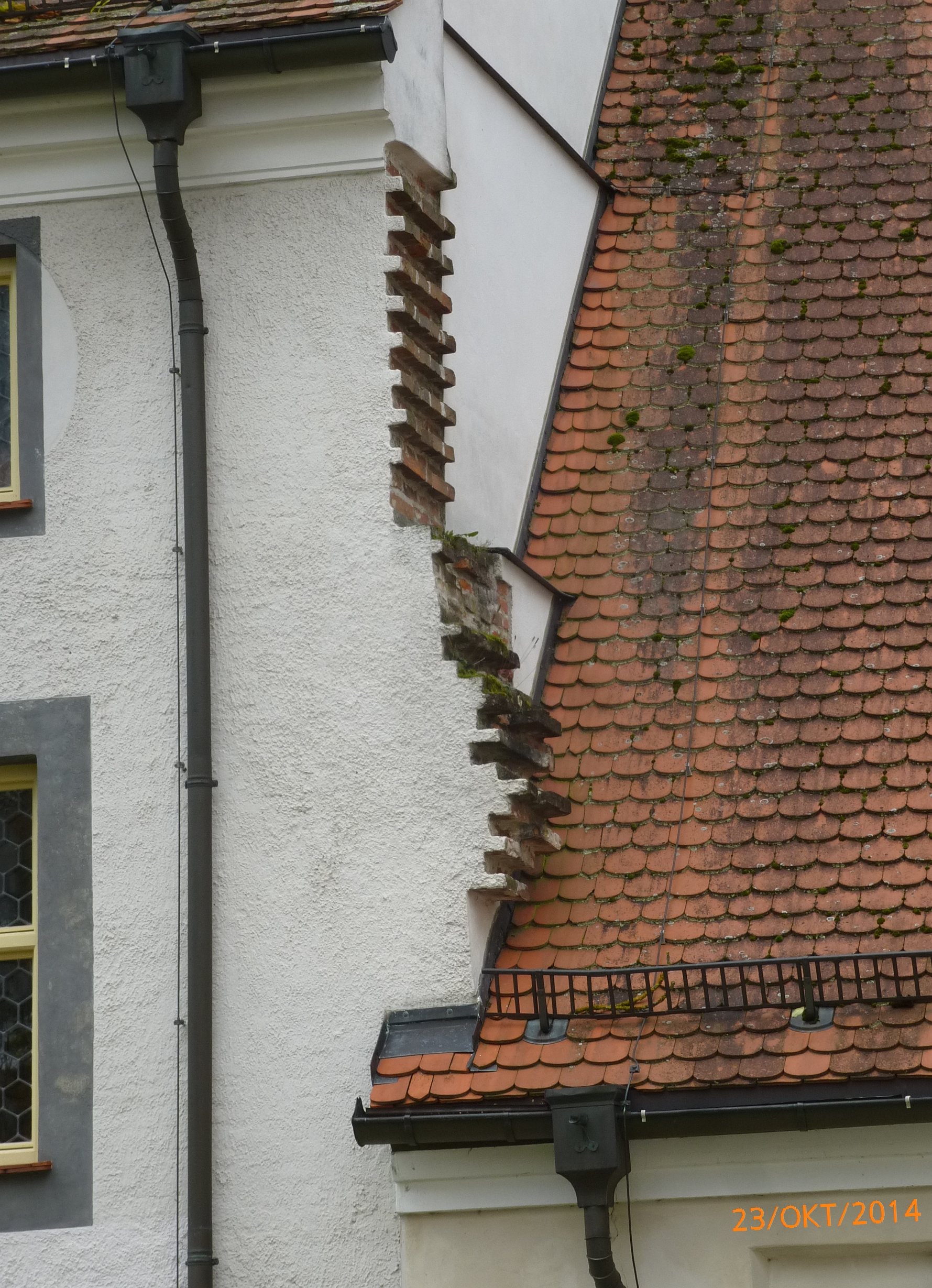
Toothing stones for an unfinished Baroque upper storey in the farmyard of Thierhaupten Abbey

In masonry, toothing stones are stones or bricks that are left projecting from a masonry wall so that later pieces can be bonded into it. They form a (usually vertical) line of projections intended to interlock with a future wall or extension. If the addition is never built, the exposed stones can provide evidence of uncompleted plans for buildings archaeology.

== Construction ==
Toothing stones can be left in alternate courses, the horizontal layers of a wall. This allows a later continuation along the same line to bond with the existing masonry. The term toothing also describes cutting back part of existing masonry to form a joint with new work.

In historic construction, toothing was also used in external walls built in several leaves, with projections left to bond with an outer facing. Where the intended facing was a decorative façade that was never completed, the projections remained exposed. Examples occur on unfinished brick church façades in Italy, including that of the Church of the Suffragio in Rimini.

== Historical terminology ==
The term tusses occurs in the building contract for Catterick Church in Yorkshire, which required the mason to leave projecting stones for a future vestry. In his 1838 architectural dictionary, John Britton explained the term by reference to the stones' resemblance to teeth or tusks. He recorded tushes as a name still used in parts of England, and toothing as the equivalent London usage.

In German, these projections are called Wartesteine (literally, 'waiting stones'), also Verzahnungssteine or Zahnsteine, and sometimes Wartezahnung. The historical Austrian term was Schmatzen.

== Evidence of building history ==
At Koło Castle in Poland, toothings helped researchers distinguish stages of construction and changes to the planned walls. The residential tower had toothings prepared for perimeter walls. On its eastern side, the later wall matched the intended thickness of 1.8 metres (5.9 ft); on the western side, the wall was 2.10 metres (6.9 ft) thick and overlapped the prepared toothing. Elsewhere in the castle, the joints between walls and toothings helped establish the sequence in which the south-western tower and adjoining curtain walls were built.

Toothing stones have also informed reconstructions. During preparations to rebuild the King's House in Brussels, Pierre-Victor Jamaer found them in the façade. He considered them alongside an early 16th-century report mentioning a tower and gallery. This evidence influenced his decision to add two levels of galleries and a central tower to the reconstructed building, work on which began in 1876.

Toothing left for future construction should be distinguished from similar-looking projections left when an adjoining part of a building has been demolished, particularly in ruins.

== Examples ==
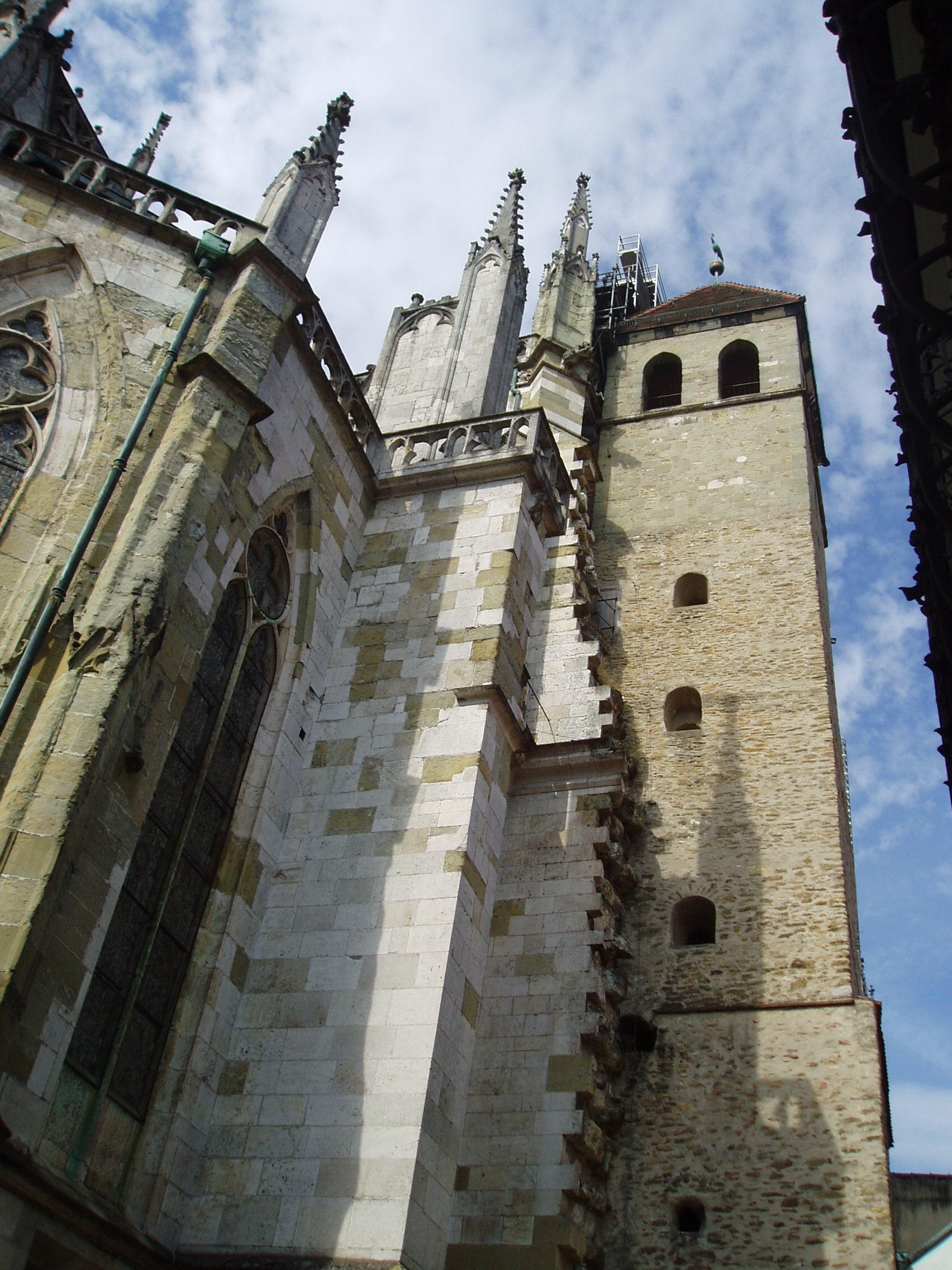
Regensburg Cathedral: toothing stones for the unfinished Gothic casing around the Eselsturm

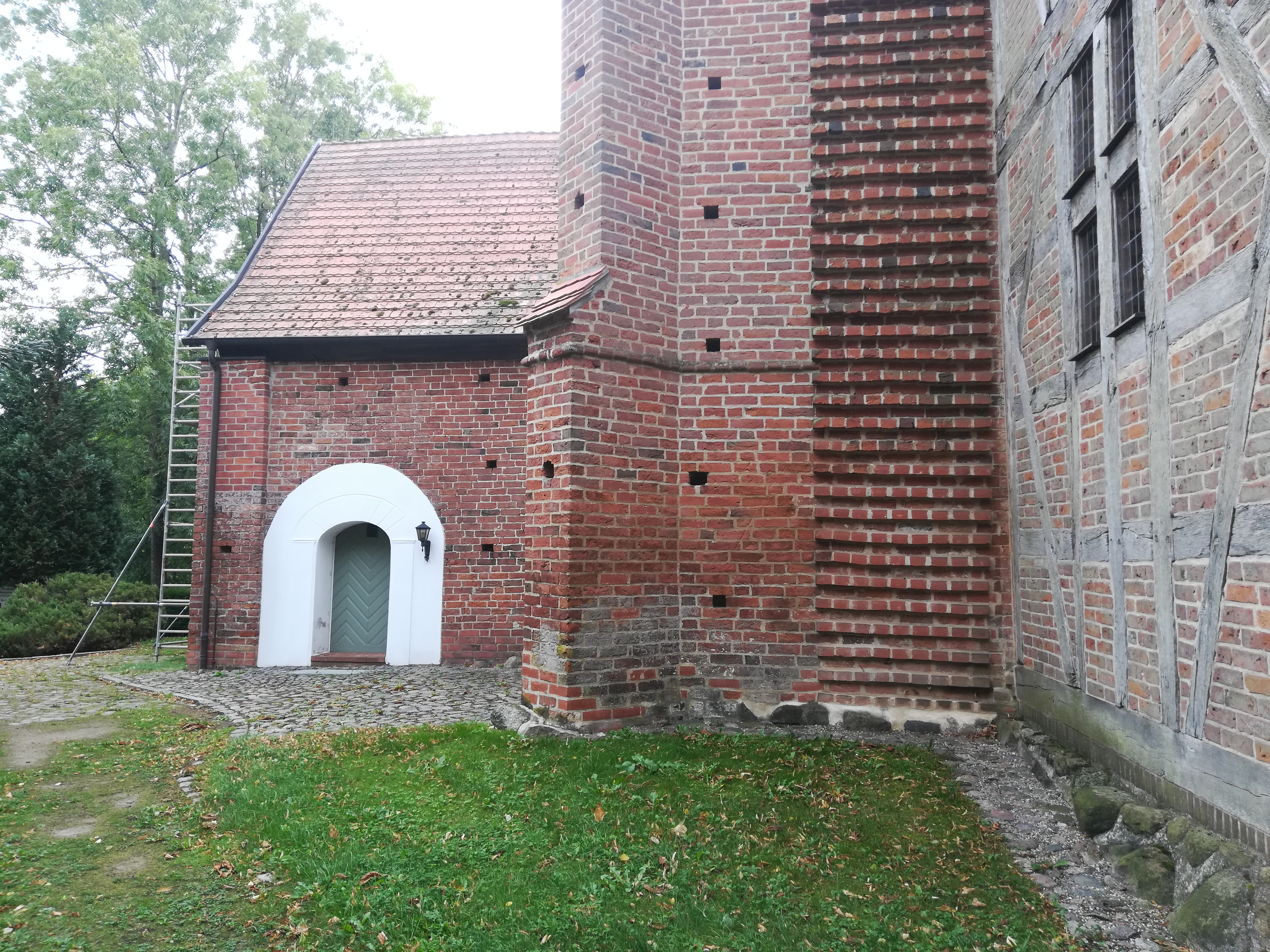
Bibow village church: toothing stones for a west tower planned in the late Middle Ages but never built

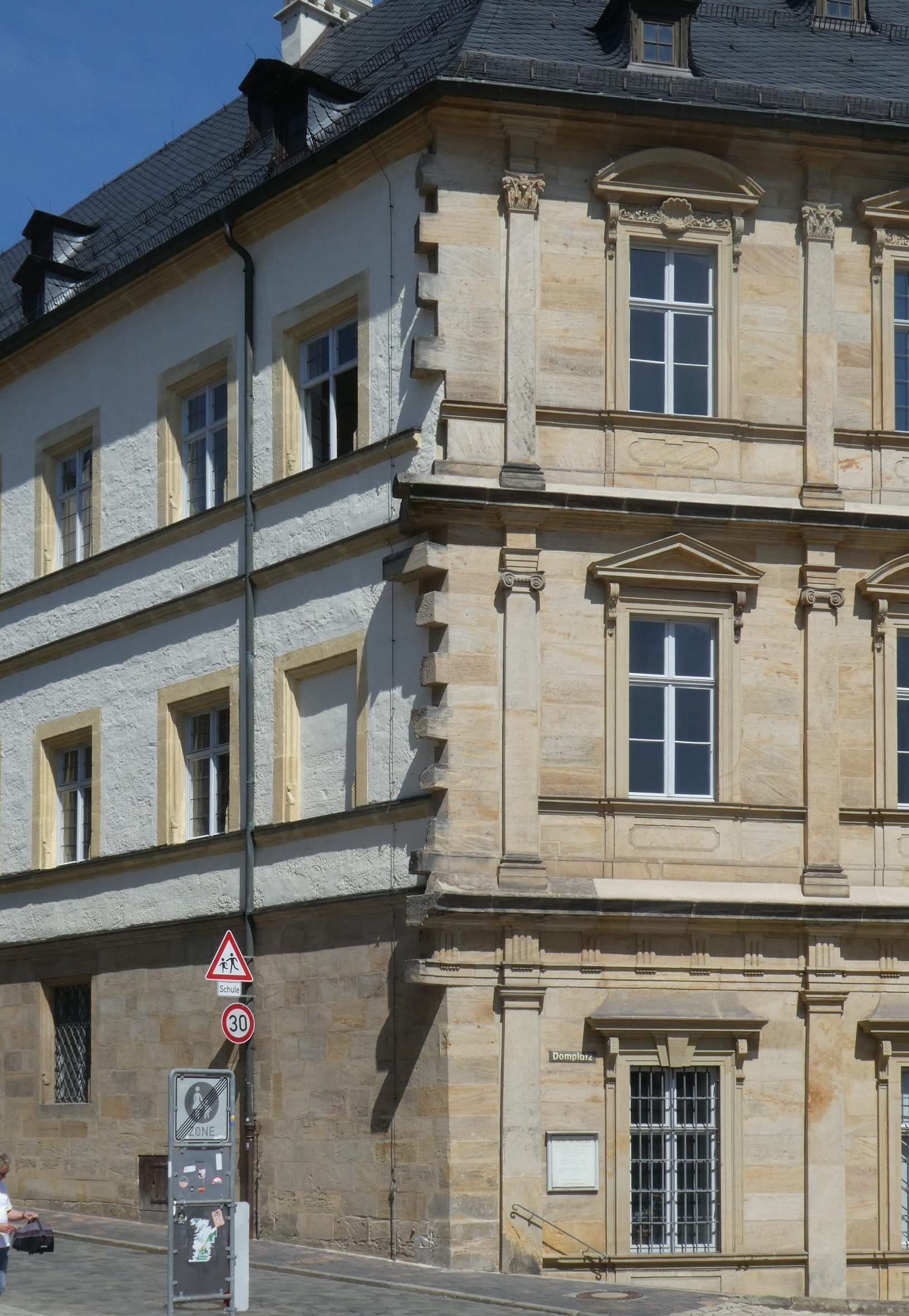
Toothing stones at the Neue Residenz in Bamberg, where the Baroque building scheme was left unfinished

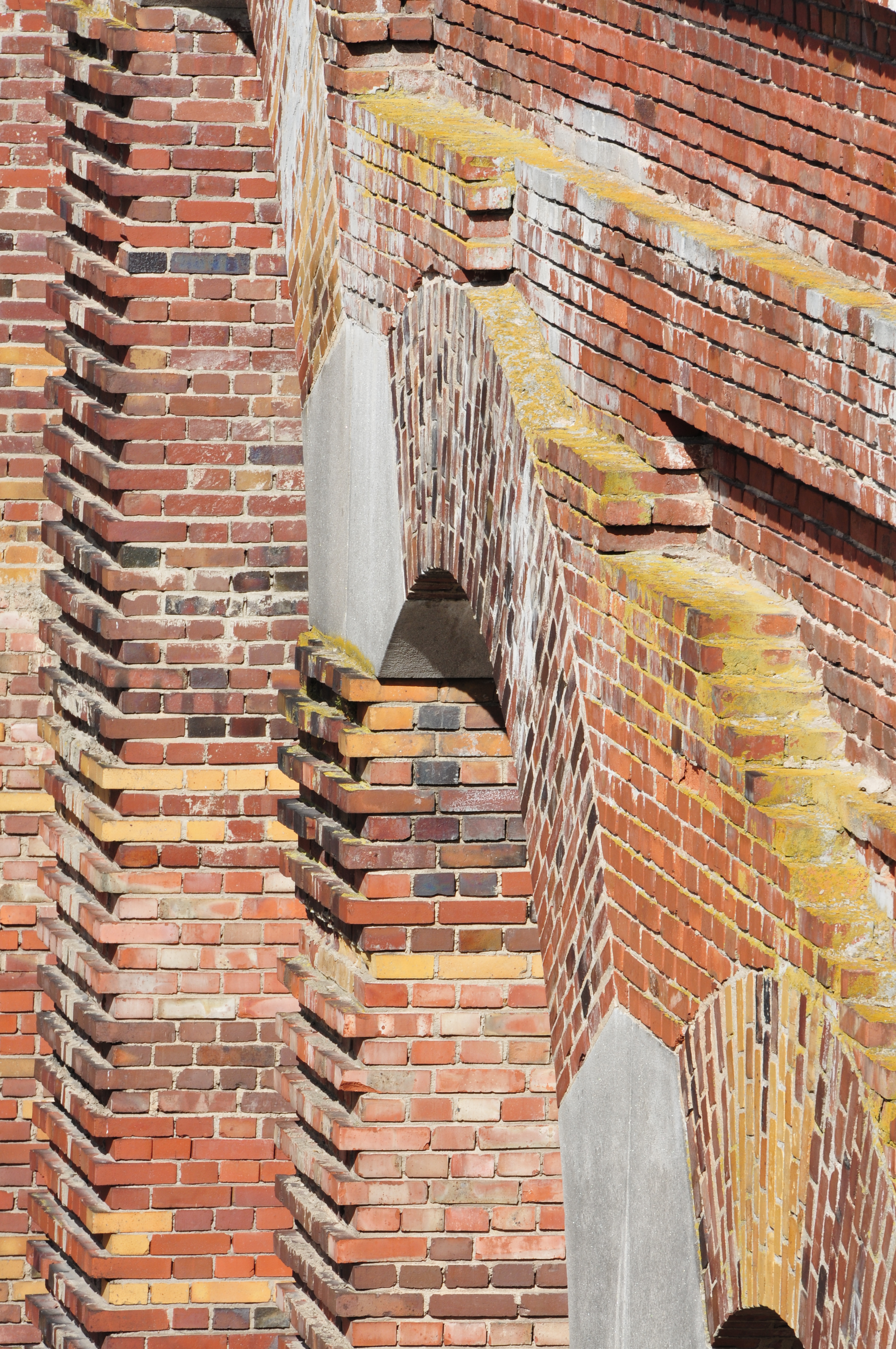
The unfinished courtyard of the Congress Hall in Nuremberg, with toothing stones

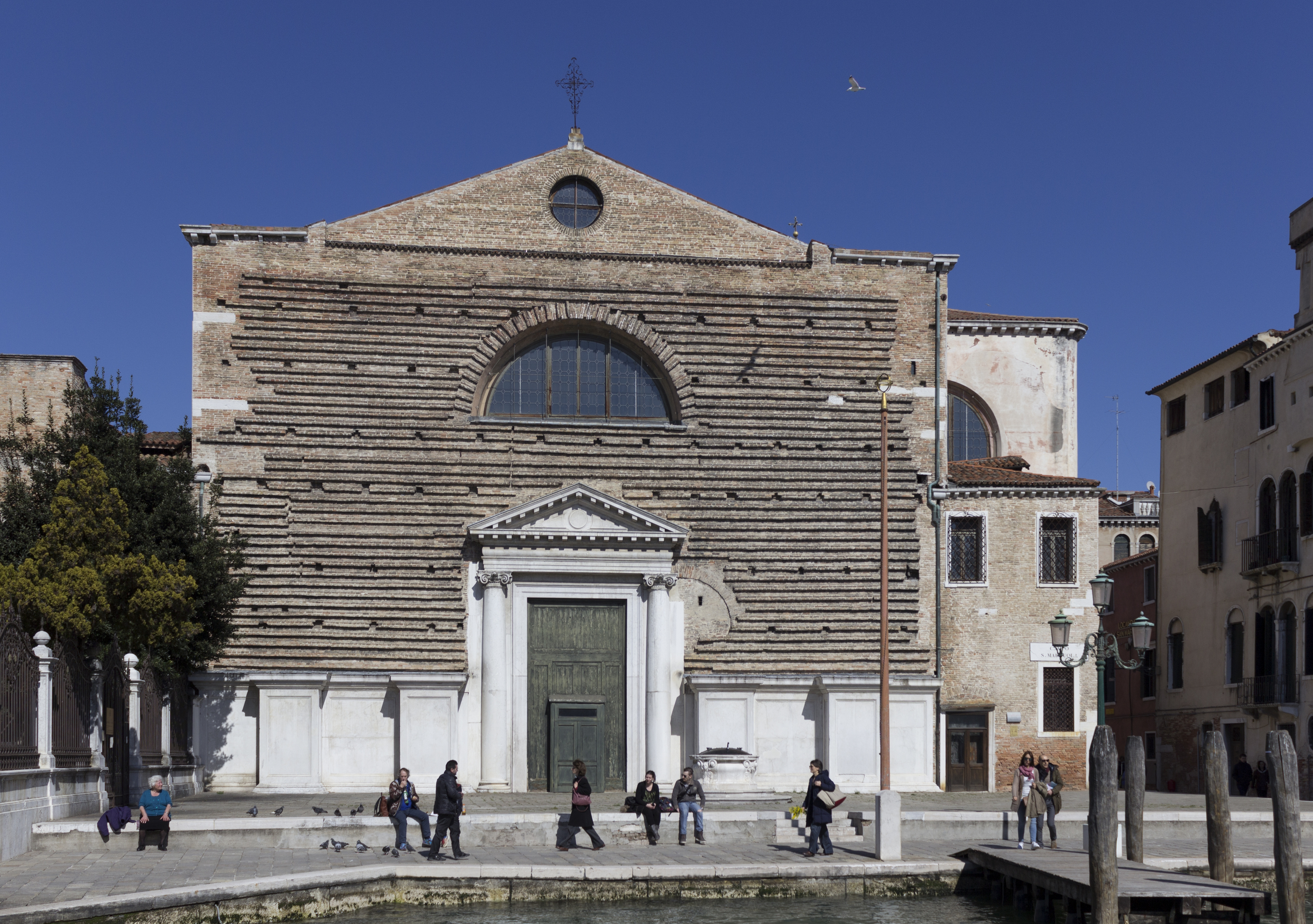
San Marcuola, Venice: the principal south façade, facing the Grand Canal, left unfinished in the 18th century

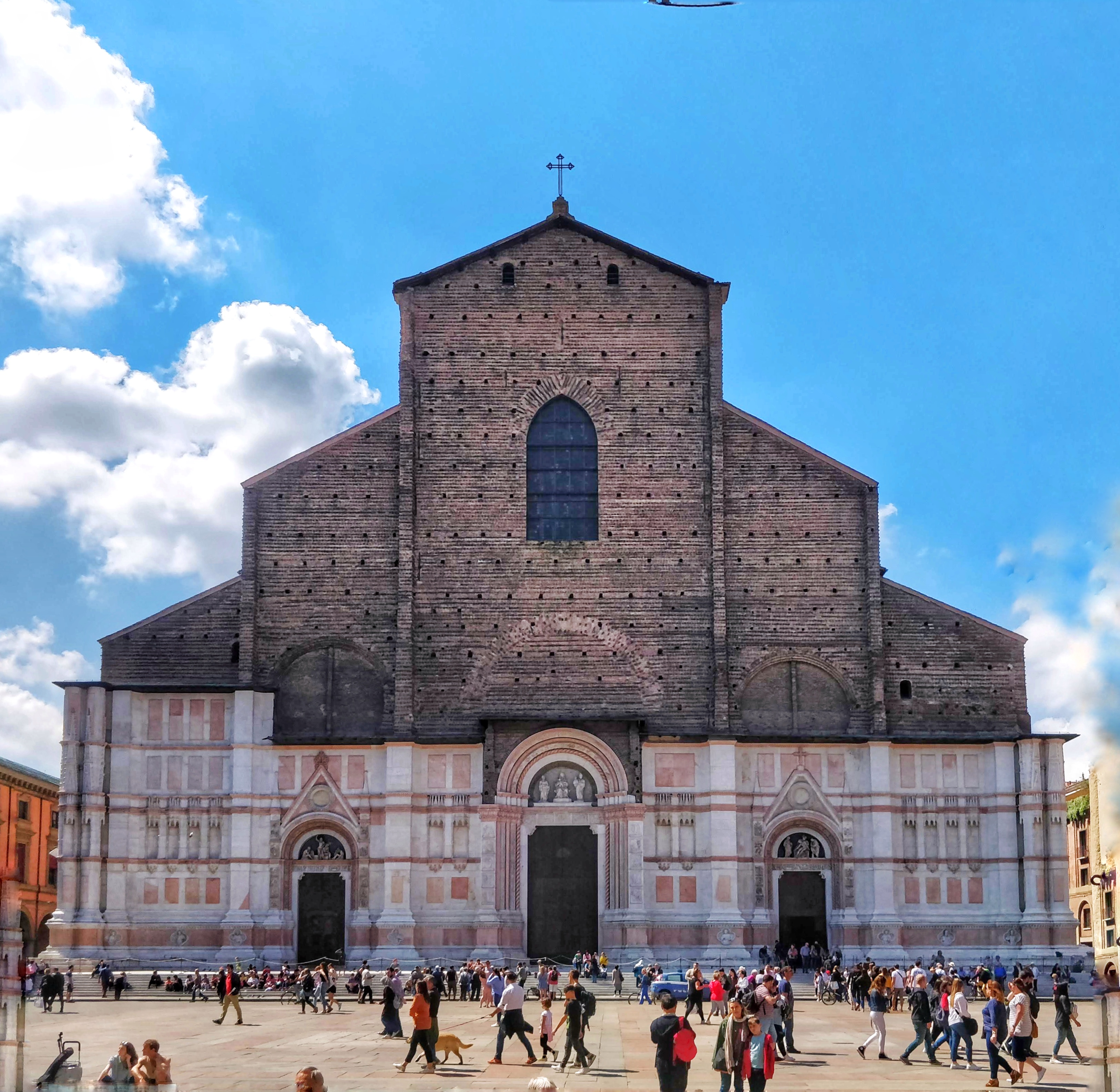
San Petronio, Bologna: toothing stones in the upper part of the unfinished Early Renaissance façade

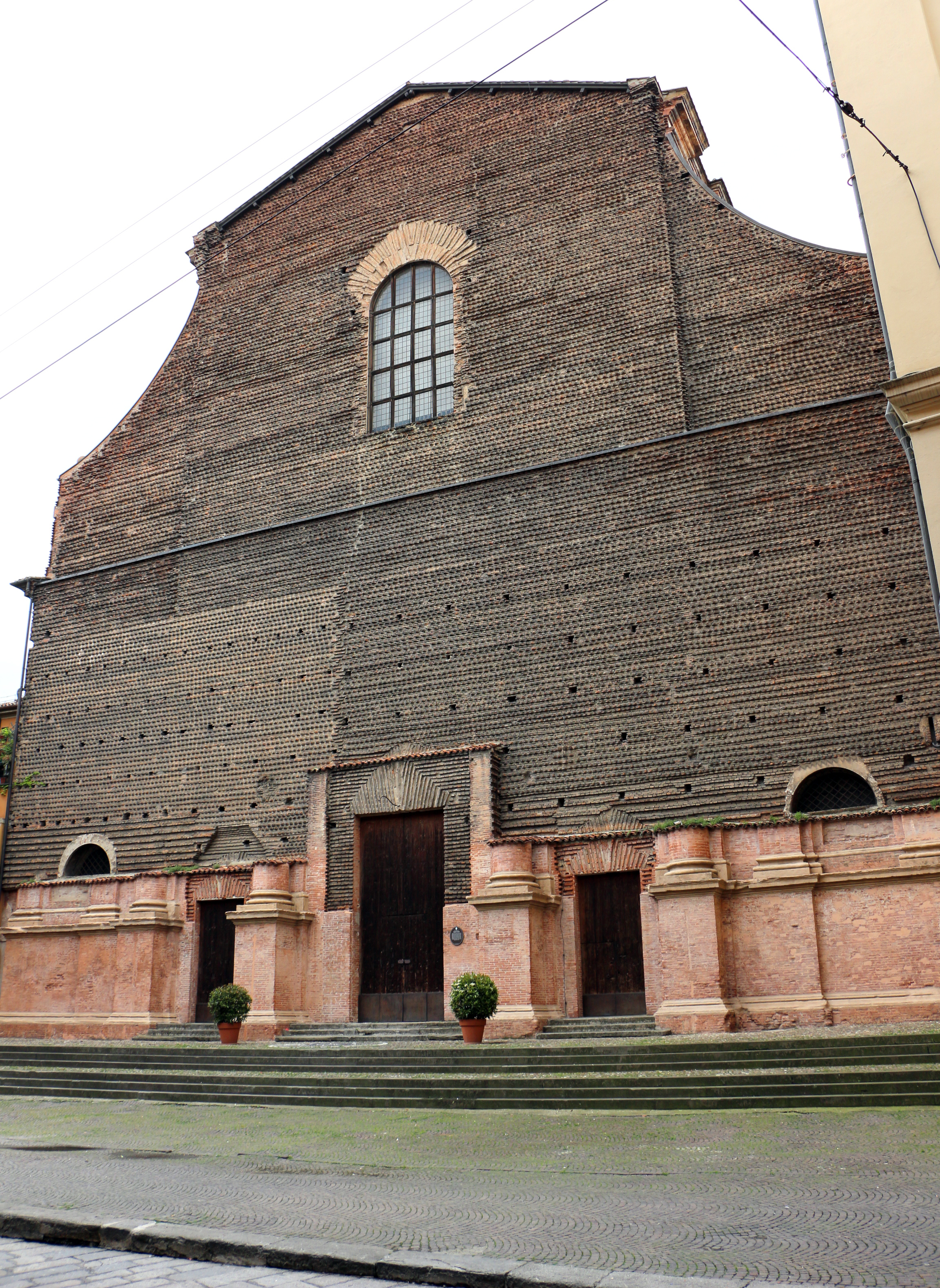
Santa Lucia, Bologna: toothing stones in the upper part of the unfinished Baroque façade

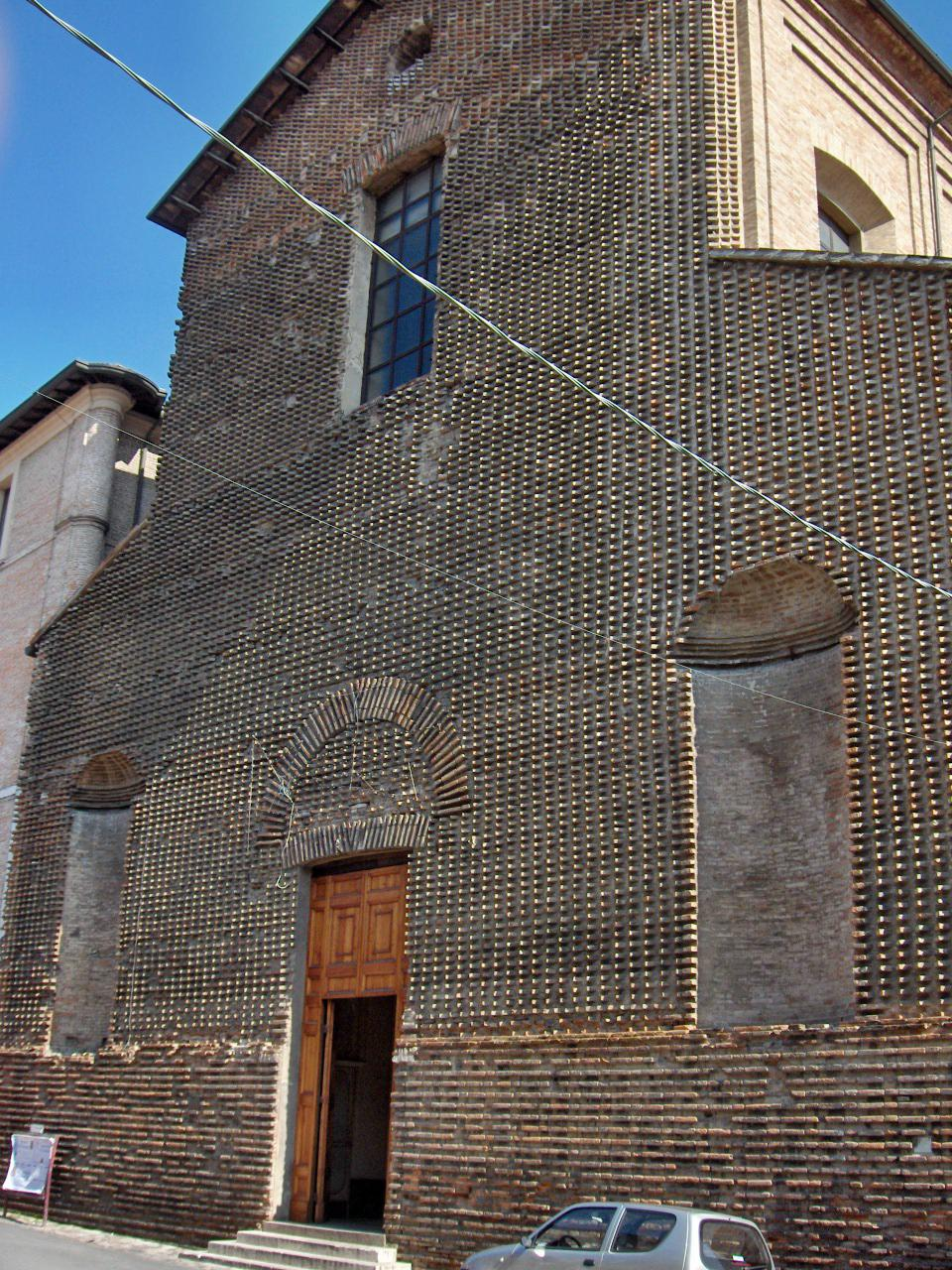
Church of the Suffragio, Rimini: the unfinished façade, with toothing stones

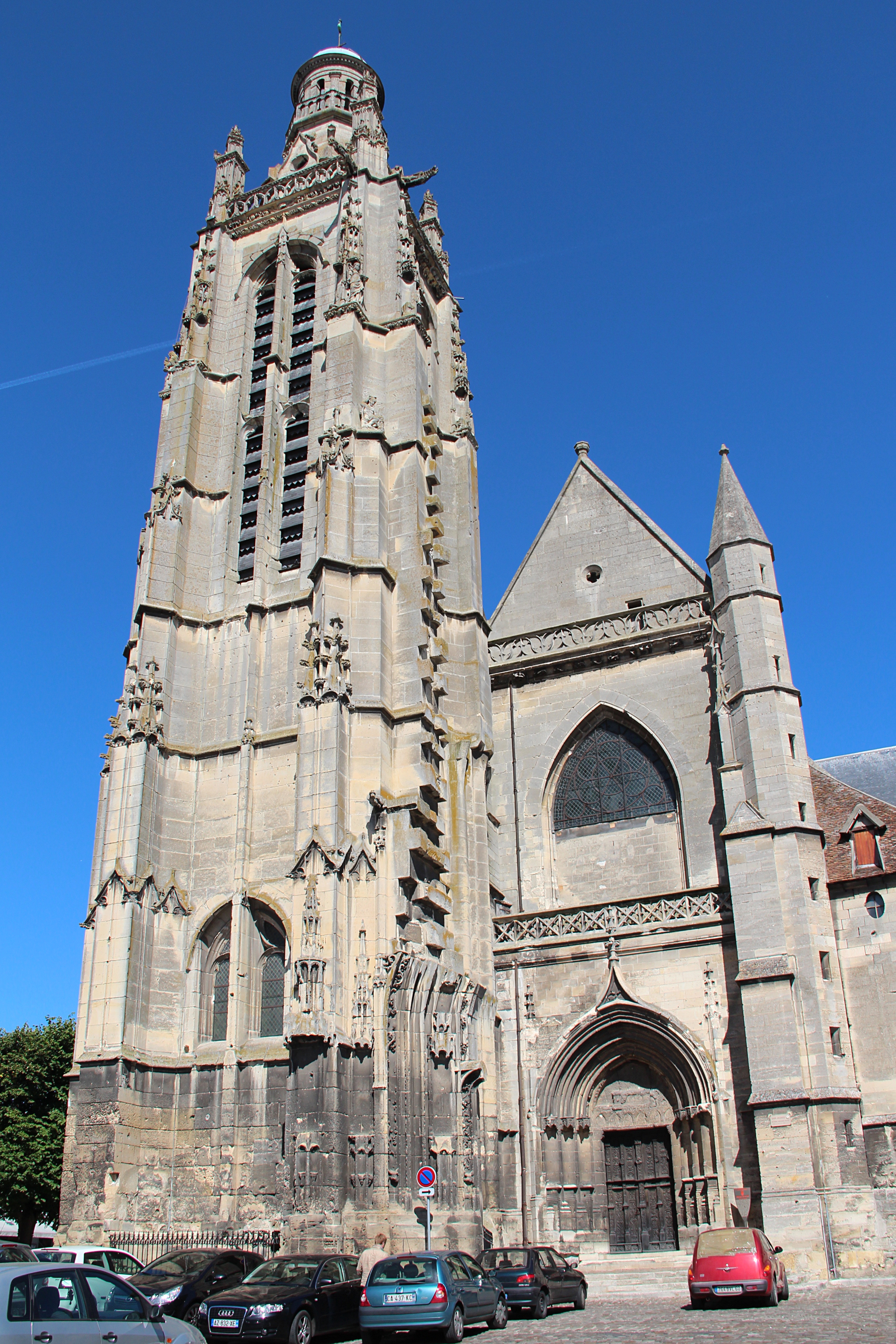
The church of Saint-Jacques in Compiègne

== See also ==
- Joint (building)
- Mortise and tenon
