= Projection (architecture) =

Architectural feature

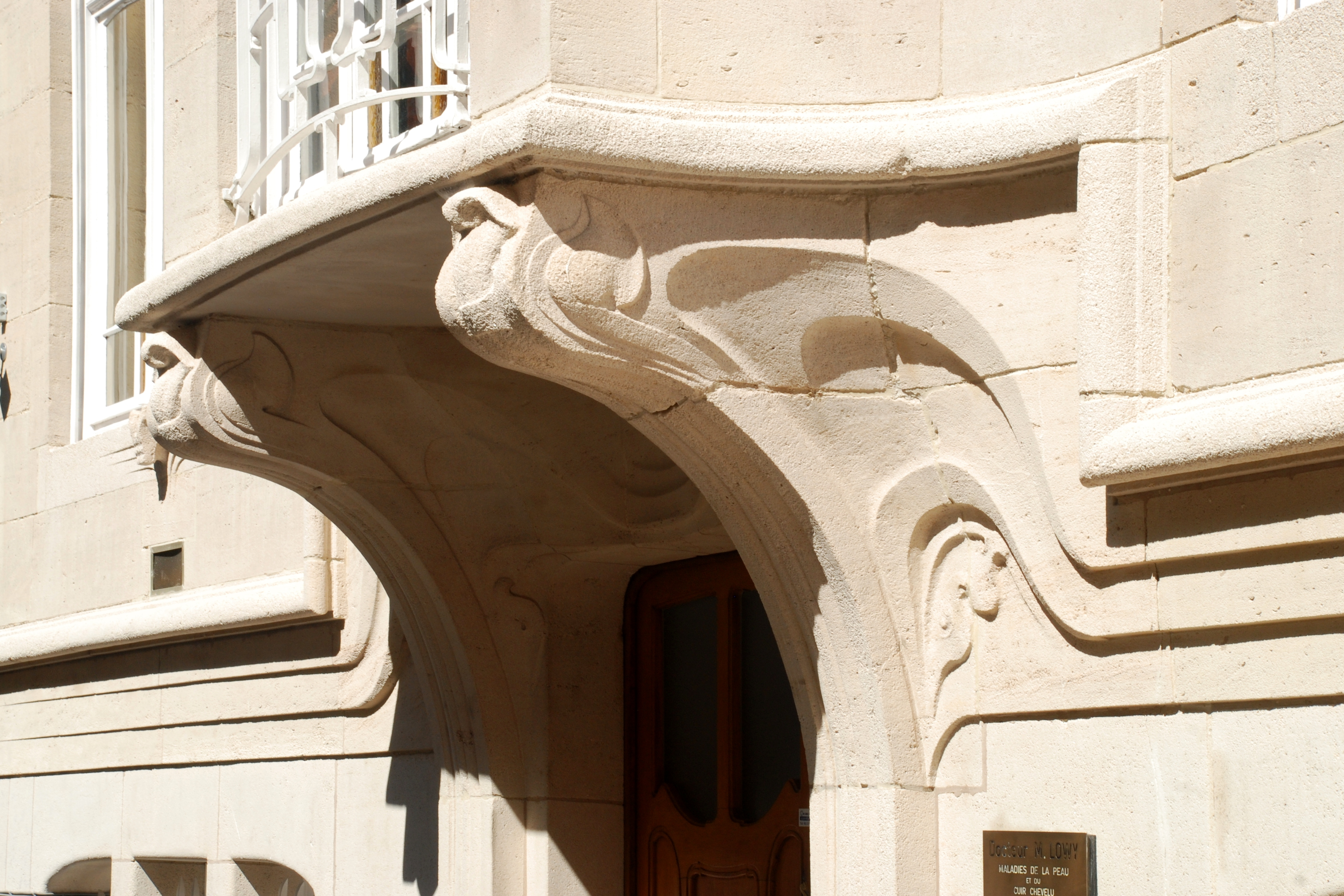
Art Nouveau consoles in Brussels

An avant-corps of the Palais de la Bourse in Bordeaux

In architecture and construction, a projection is a part of a building that extends beyond the surrounding surface. Projecting elements include pilasters, door and window surrounds, plinths, archivolts, cornices, balconies and sills. The term also describes the distance by which an element extends beyond the plane of a wall: for example, the projection of a cornice is measured from the wall's flat surface.

In masonry, projection also refers to stones placed beyond the main wall face to give the surface a rough or rustic appearance.

== Forms and functions ==
A corbel can support an overhanging member or course of masonry, or serve as an ornament. In corbelling, successive projections step farther out as the masonry rises. A cantilever extends horizontally beyond its support; a cantilever beam is supported at one end only.

Projections are also used to channel rainwater. A hood mould, or drip moulding, projects around the top of a door or window to shed water. At a roof edge, a projecting drip edge directs rainwater off the roof.

== Terminology ==
A fascia is a flat horizontal member with little projection, such as one of the bands of an Ionic or Corinthian architrave.

In French architectural terminology, the flat surface from which projections are measured is called the nu. In his 1814 architectural vocabulary, J. M. R. Morisot used the term face for a broad, flat member with little projection, such as a band of an architrave or the face of a cornice. He defined alignment as bringing several elements to the same projection; masonry walls are aligned when their stones appear to lie in a straight line when sighted along. Overhanging and corbelled elements are forms of projection.

=== Projecting elements and related terms ===
Morisot's vocabulary describes the following architectural elements and construction details in terms of their projection:

- Avant-corps (also German: Risalit): a part of a building that projects beyond another part.
- Toothing stones (pierres d'attente): stones left projecting in alternate courses at the end of a wall, so that another wall can subsequently be bonded to it.
- Balcony: a stone projection in front of one or more windows.
- Bandeau: a plain, flat band projecting from a wall around a door or window opening, forming a surround.
- Bossage: projecting material, including rough masses left for carving column capitals, modillions, keystones, consoles, decorative panels and coats of arms, or projections in stone or plaster at the corners of external walls.
- Console: an S-shaped projecting ornament supporting the underside of an entablature cornice or an interior cornice, a window sill or a balcony.
- Corbel: a projecting stone course cut in the form of a bracket, used to support a floor beam or wall plate.
- Cordon: a stone projection with a square or semicircular profile, used in the retaining walls of quays or terraces.
- Cornice: a projecting, moulded feature that crowns an architectural element.
- Corps: a part of a building that projects beyond the wall face and rises from the foot of the main building.
- Footing (empattement): the projection of a foundation wall beyond either face of the wall above it.
- Empaume: a projection left on the face of a stone block or column drum during dressing to facilitate its placement.
- Corbelling: a projection beyond the face of a wall formed by one or more stones; where several stones are used, each projects beyond the one below.
- Entablature: the projecting structure that crowns a classical order, consisting of an architrave, frieze and cornice. Morisot also used the term for a simple cornice at the top of an external wall beneath the eaves.
- Gutta: a small projection in the form of a truncated cone on a cornice.
- Lip (lèvre): a projection at the top of the drum of a capital.
- Modillion: a projecting bracket that appears to support the underside of the corona of an entablature or cornice, also used beneath window sills.
- Moulding: an ornamental projection, square or rounded, straight or curved. Combinations of mouldings form cornices, imposts, door and window surrounds, and the bases of columns and pilasters.
- Naissance: the point at which an element begins to emerge or project, as at the springing of a vault or the curved transition to a column shaft.
- Oreille: a notch cut at the end of a window sill or threshold, allowing it to fit into the side of the opening while retaining its projection beyond the wall face.
- Porte-à-faux: an element that projects or is corbelled out, such as an entablature or balcony, or one that does not stand directly above a foundation. Morisot's examples include a pier built over the middle of the span of an architrave or a supporting beam.
- Overlap (recouvrement): the projection of one stone or slab over the joint with an adjacent stone or slab.
- Threshold: a stone laid at the bottom of a doorway between its jambs. If it projects beyond the wall and stands above ground level, it forms a step; there may be one such stone or two laid one above the other.

== Gallery ==
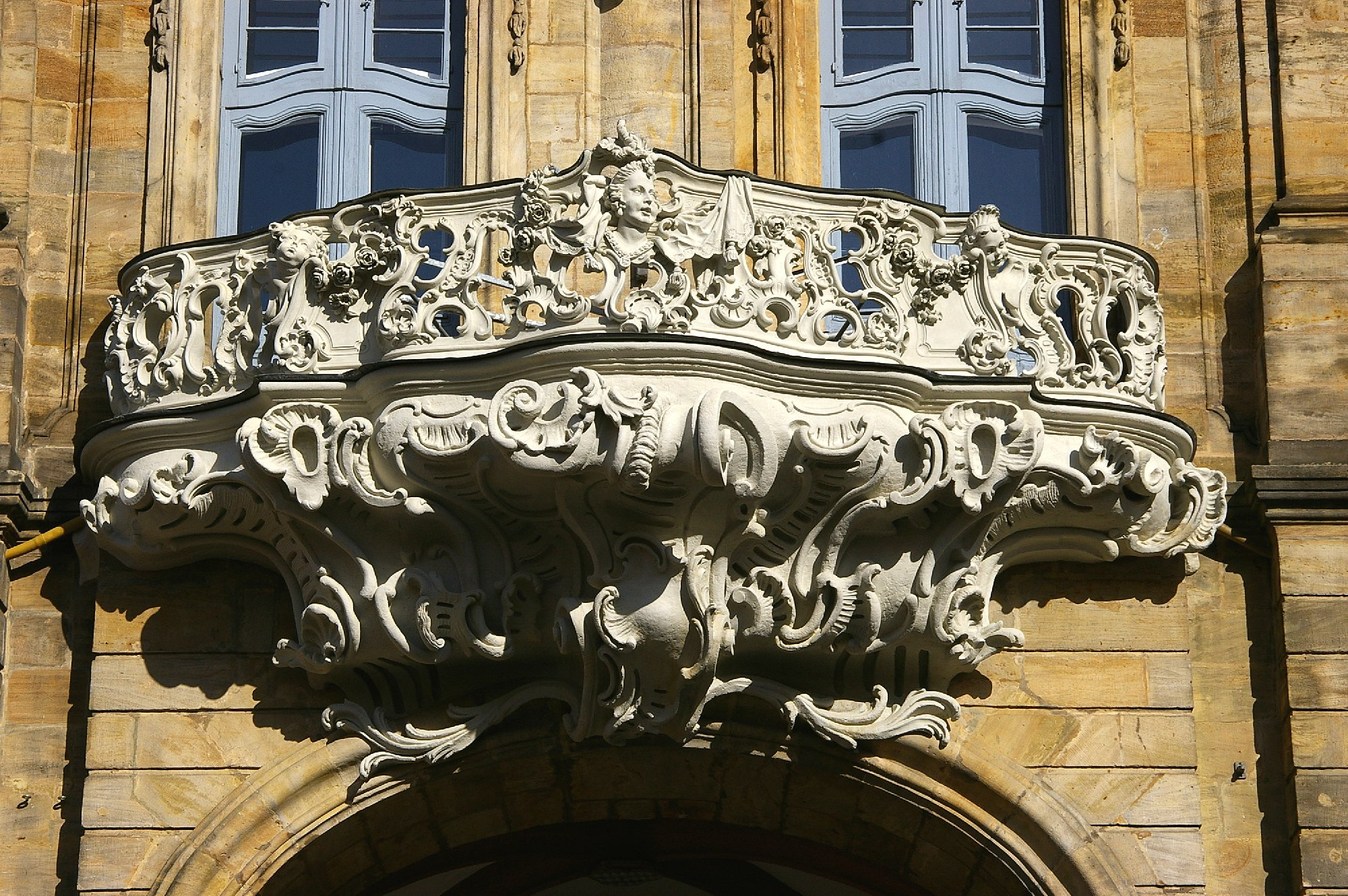
Rococo balcony at the Old Town Hall in Bamberg

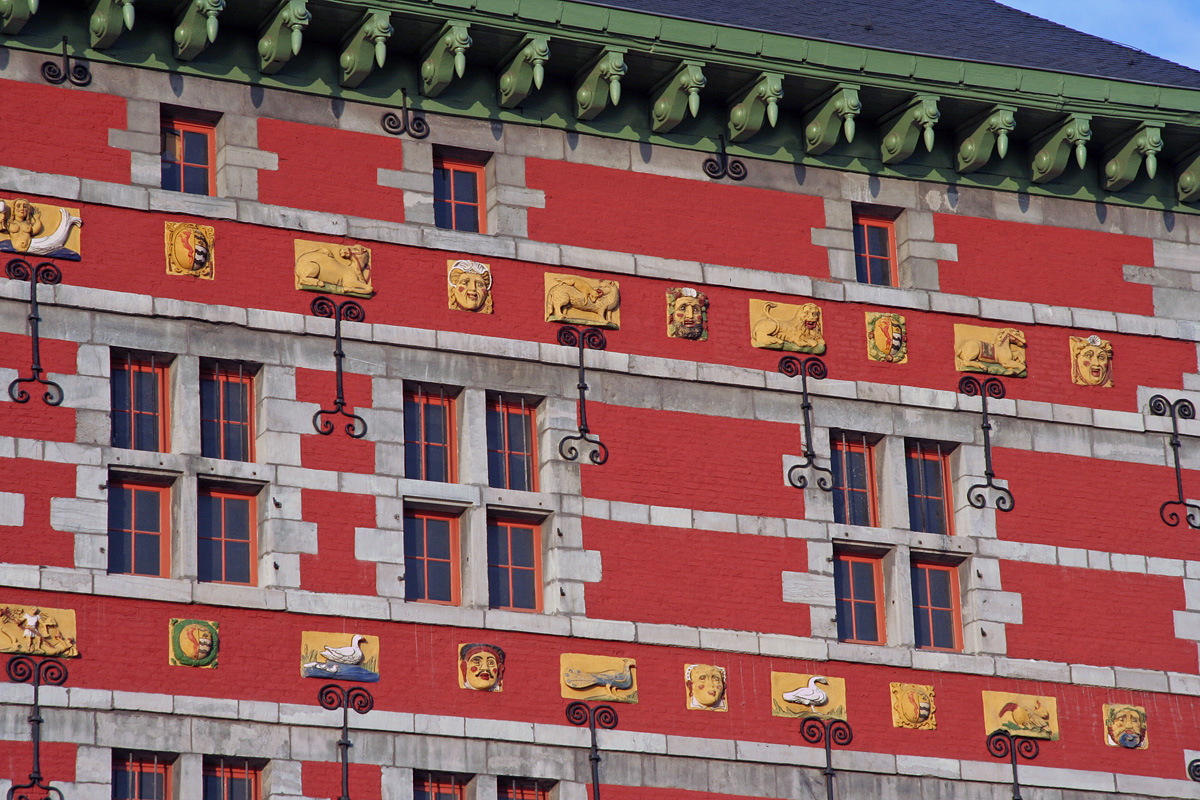
Projecting bands on the Curtius Palace in Liège

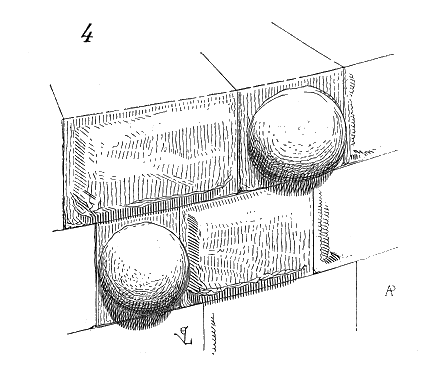
Hemispherical bossage

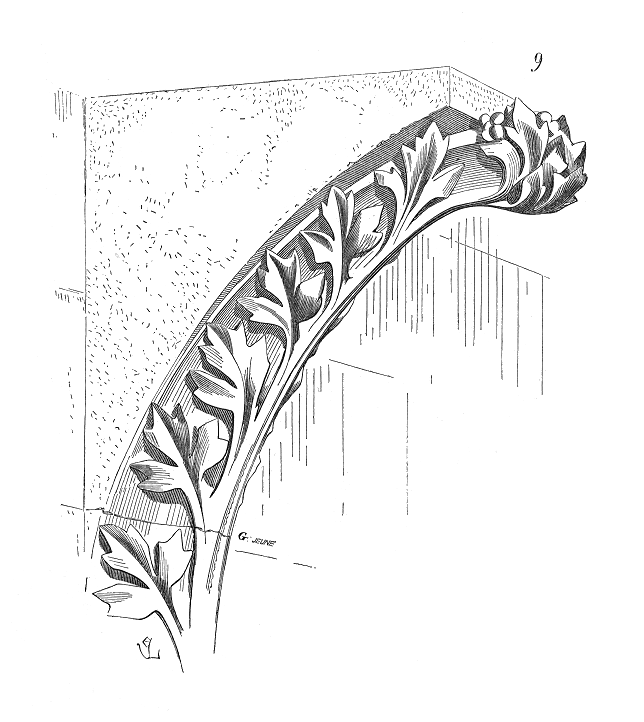
Corbel found near Troyes Cathedral, illustrated by Eugène Viollet-le-Duc

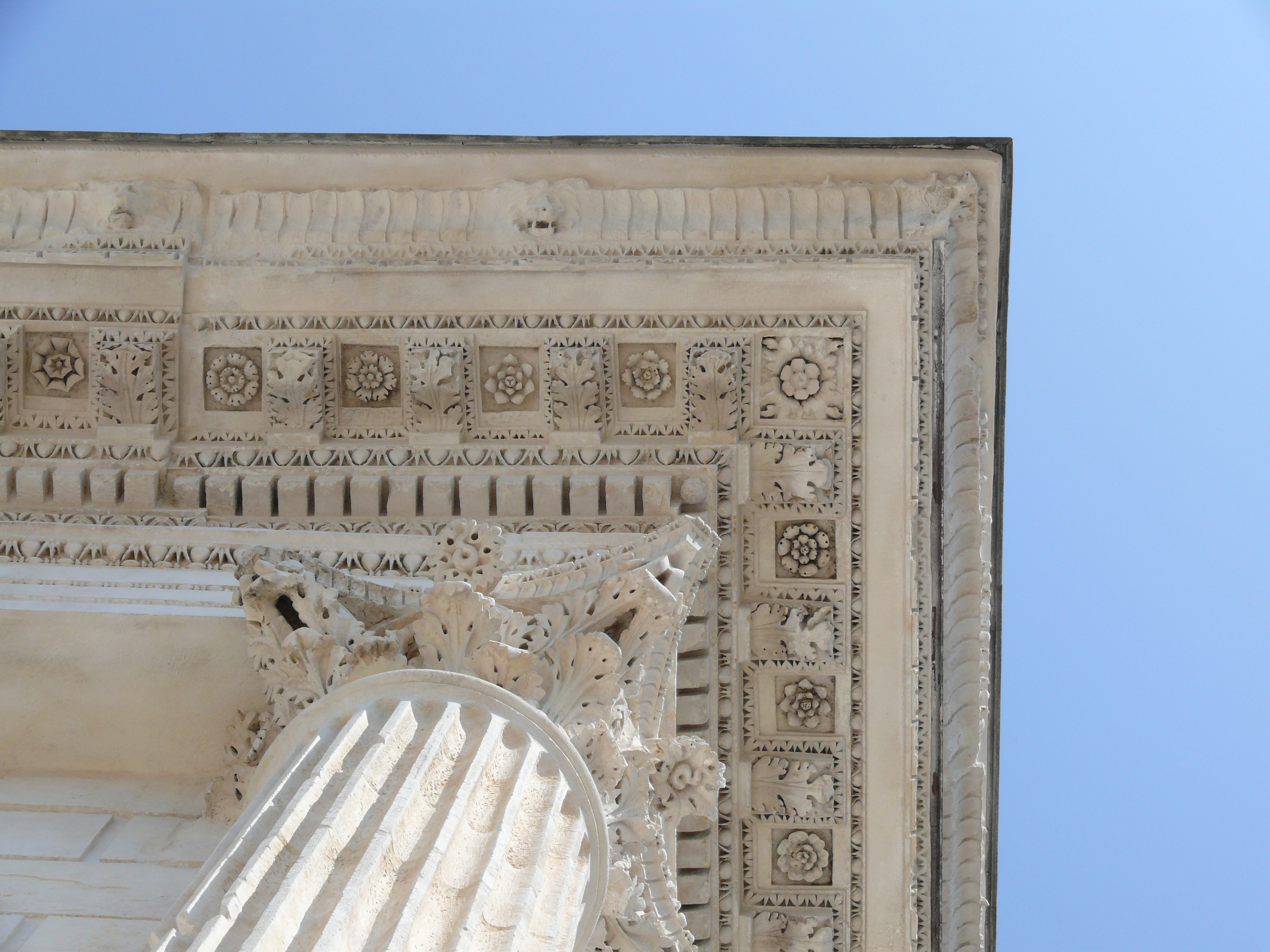
Cornice of the Maison Carrée in Nîmes

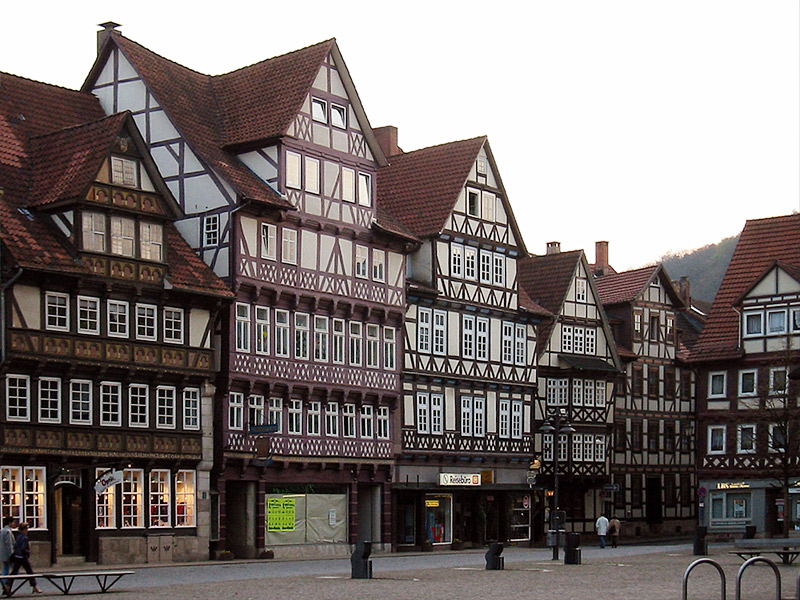
Houses with jettied upper storeys

== See also ==
- Architectural element
