= Medieval bioarchaeology =

Study of human remains recovered from medieval archaeological sites

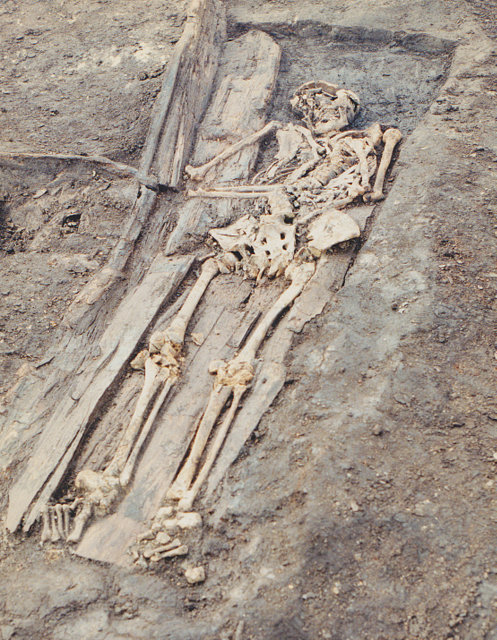
Medieval skeleton from the Netherlands

Medieval bioarchaeology is the study of human remains recovered from medieval archaeological sites. Bioarchaeology aims to understand populations through the analysis of human skeletal remains and this application of bioarchaeology specifically aims to understand medieval populations. There is an interest in the Medieval Period when it comes to bioarchaeology, because of how differently people lived back then as opposed to now, in regards to not only their everyday life, but during times of war and famine as well. The biology and behavior of those that lived in the Medieval Period can be analyzed by understanding their health and lifestyle choices.

== Non-specific stress indicators ==
=== Dental non-specific stress indicators ===
==== Enamel hypoplasia ====
Linear enamel hypoplasias are examples of periods of stress or disruption in a child's health where horizontal bands form on the teeth that can be examined macroscopically and represent a localized decrease in enamel thickness. Enamel hypoplasias are used in bioarchaeological research as markers of childhood physiological stress.

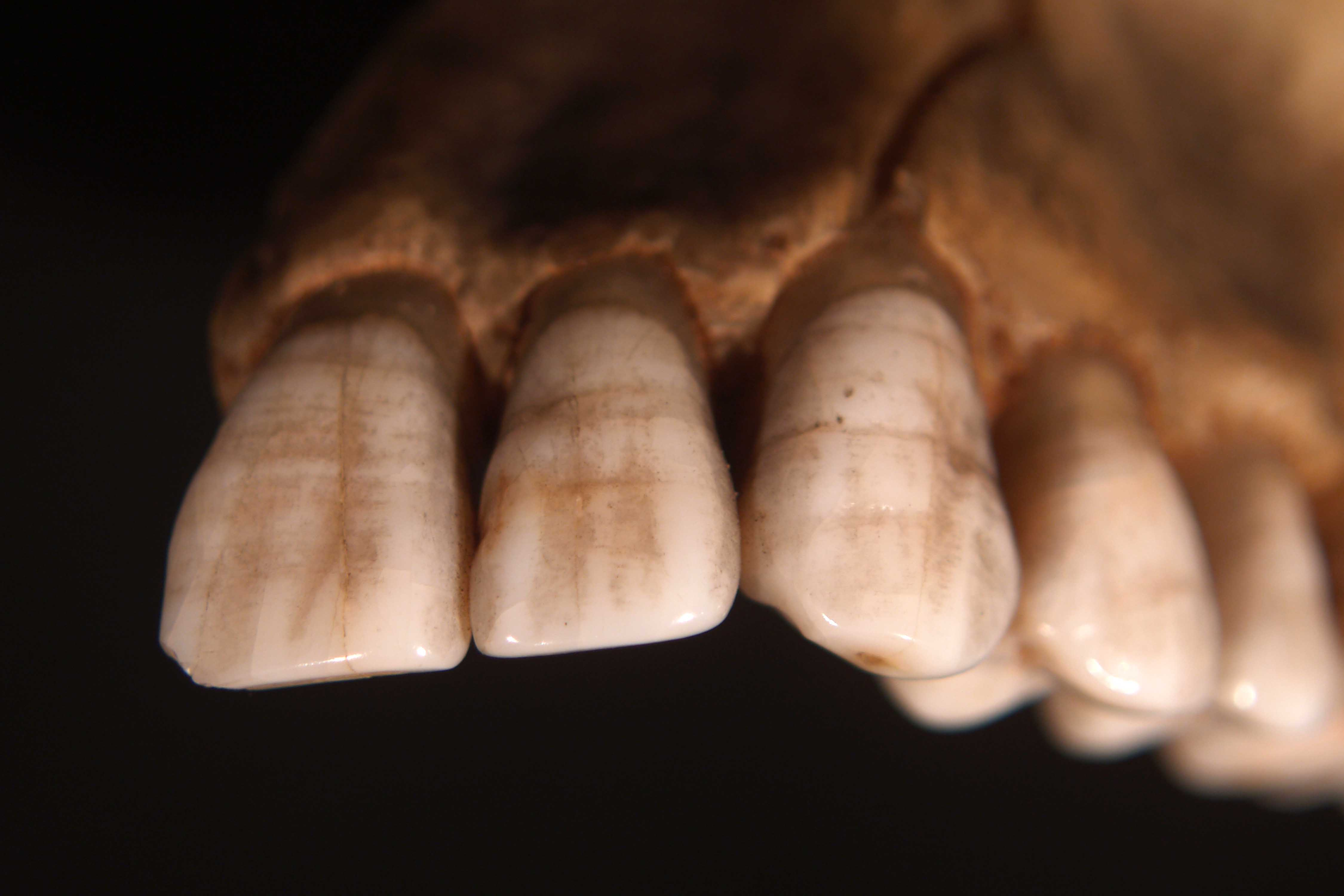
Teeth displaying enamel hypoplasia lines

Justyna Jolanta Miszkiewicz, from the University of Kent, studied linear enamel hypoplasia and age-at-death in the medieval population of Canterbury, UK. She specifically focused on the populations at St. Gregory's Priory and Cemetery. She found 374 teeth with linear enamel hypoplasia in either the mandibular or maxillary permanent teeth. She also found that there were significantly greater frequency of linear enamel hypoplasia in the cemetery compared to the Priory. The mean number of teeth with linear enamel hypoplasia in the cemetery was 17.6 and the mean number at the Priory was 7.9. This study also measured age-at-death of the individuals as well as what types of social groups they represented. The results indicated that childhood stress might reflect adult mortality and that the health of individuals from diverse social backgrounds can be assessed using linear enamel hypoplasia analysis.

=== Skeletal non-specific stress indicators ===
==== Porotic hyperostosis and cribra orbitalia ====
Porotic hyperostosis is a pathological condition affecting the cranial vault. It is characterized by porosities in the outer table of the cranial vault or orbital roof. When porosities are exhibited in the orbital roof it is called cribra orbitalia. Since the 1950s, the most widely accepted probable cause of porotic hyperostosis and cribra orbitalia is chronic iron-deficiency anemia. While dietary deficiencies are the most probable cause, other possibilities include nutrients lost to intestinal parasites.

Anne L. Grauer, Professor of Anthropology at Loyola University Chicago, assessed the presence of porotic hyperostosis and periosteal reactions in the population (n=1,014) from St. Helen-on-the-Walls in York, England. She used porotic hyperostosis and periosteal reactions to examine health and disease in urban medieval England. Grauer discovered that 58% of the population displayed evidence of porotic hyperostosis and 21.5% displayed evidence of periosteal reactions.

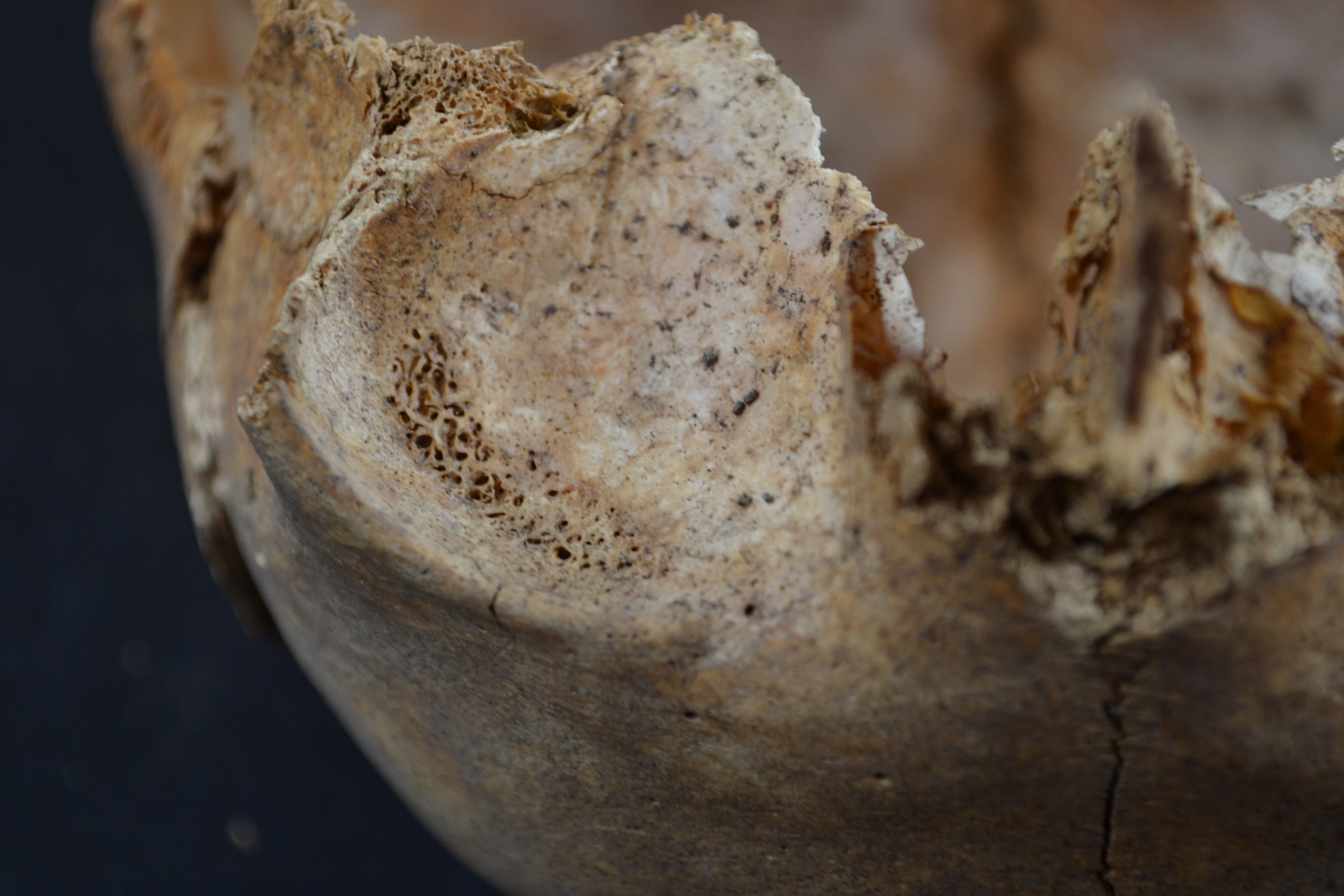
Cribra orbitalia in a young child.

In 2002, J. Piontek and T. Kozlowski, from the Adam Mickiewicz University and Nicholas Copernicus University, respectively, studied that frequency of cribra orbitalia in Medieval Polish populations. The purpose of this study was to present data on the frequency of cribra orbitalia in skulls of children from a cemetery in Gruczno, Poland and compare these results with the frequency of cribra orbitalia in adult populations. They found frequencies of 47.1% of cribra orbitalia in children aged 0–7 at death and frequencies of 50% in children who died between ages 7 and 15. The authors concluded that the living conditions of the medieval populations in Gruczno did not necessarily guarantee the good health of children and adolescents due to the exposure of pathological factors that disturbed their growth and development.

==== Harris lines ====
Harris lines are stress indicators on the skeleton that form due to malnutrition, disease, or other stress factors during childhood. During this time, bone growth is temporarily stopped or slowed down but bone mineralization will continue. Once the stress has decreased or stopped, bone growth will resume, which results in a line of increased mineral density that can be seen in radiographs. If there is no recovery from stress, no line will be formed.

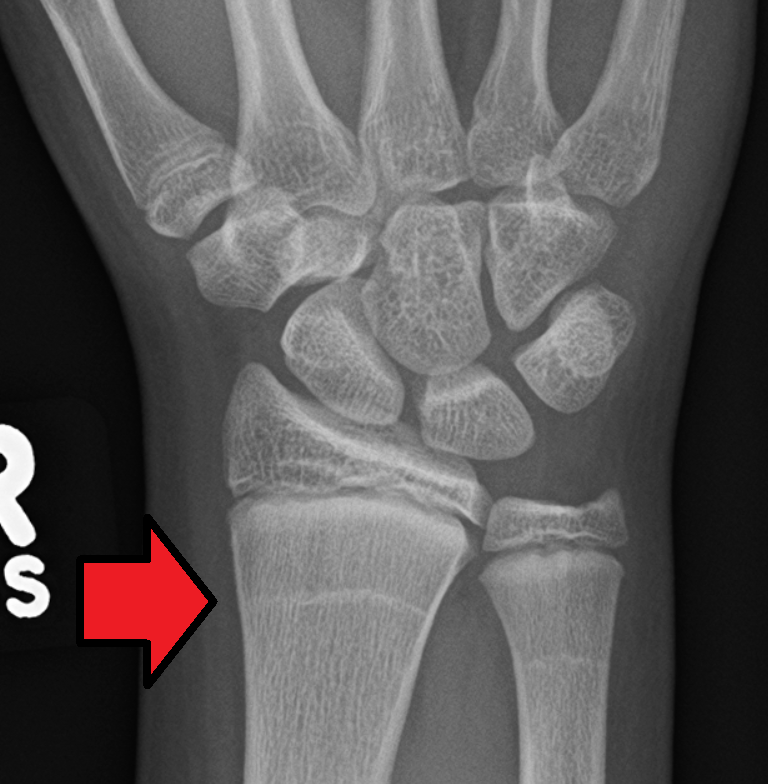
Harris lines in child with growth arrest due to bone disease.

Ameen et al. (2005) studied the incidence of Harris lines in medieval populations from Berne, Switzerland. the scholars from the University Hospital of Berne collected radiographs of the tibia from 112 well-preserved skeletons that lived during the 8th-15th centuries. They also compared their results with the radiographs of 138 living patients in the same geographic region. They found evidence of Harris lines in 88 of the 112 (80%) medieval skeletons and in 28 of 138 (20%) of the living individuals. In both populations, Harris lines were found at age 2 and between ages 8 and 12. The occurrence of Harris lines was associated with degenerative bone disease, trauma, osteoporosis, peripheral vascular diseases, rickets, rheumatoid arthritis, and bony deformities. The authors concluded that the medieval populations in Switzerland probably experienced difficult living situations and poor hygienic conditions and the Harris lines in children of the population reflected poor care and neglect.

Cortisol level in hair

Changes in protein and cortisol levels during growth and stress will have an impact on the composition of hair. These changes usually reflect the last few months before the death of a person, not including the last two weeks. Hair samples can be analyzed by looking at the levels of Nitrogen-and-carbon-isotopes. Cortisol levels from hair samples can provide evidence for stressors caused due to physical events but usually reflect dietary changes and movement.

== Mechanical stress and activity indicators ==
Bioarchaeologists can study the effects that activities and workload have on the skeleton in order to understand the kinds of labor that people were doing in the past. Stress markers can also indicate patterns in the division of labor and how certain activities were structured within society. Wolff's law states that bones are affected and remodeled by repetitive physical activity or inactivity. Mechanical stress changes the cross-sections of bones and may, to a limited extent change entheses, while prolonged inactivity can lead to bone loss. Because things had to be done manually, such as agriculture and carrying activities, physical stress affected both men and women during this time. Degenerative disorders were more prominent than disease. Physical stress is easier to see on the bones, compared to disease on the bone, because it takes a significant amount of time for evidence to appear on the bone, and without medical treatment, these people would die before the disease would show itself on the bone.

=== Injury and workload ===
Amanda Agnew and Hedy Justus, from the Ohio State University, studied examples of trauma and stress in the population of Medieval Giecz in Poland. During this time, Giecz was an important political and religious center. The sample included 275 burials that were analyzed for trauma and stress, but only adults were analyzed for trauma. Most cases of trauma were non-violent, although 3.4% of individuals with trauma had injuries that were clearly due to violent intent. The low evidence of intentional violence led the authors to conclude the unlikelihood of members of the population being involved in military activity, which was common in the area. However, the stress-related traumatic injuries indicated a population that had a very laborious lifestyle, often associated with agricultural activities. For example, the population exhibited a high frequency of spinal trauma, including compression fractures and spondylolysis. Vertebral trauma is indicative of heavy compression loads over long periods of time. The authors also studied osteochondritis dissecans, which can be caused by repetitive traumatic events and the overuse of joints due to physical activity. The study concluded that heavy workload and strenuous activities extended to males, females, and adolescents. Furthermore, the authors found that the population at Giecz experienced stressful environmental conditions like poor nutrition and infections.

As far as vertebral trauma goes, it was very common in most adults, especially males, according to H. Nathan's study done on 400 vertebral columns in hopes of their osteophytes providing accurate results. This study was on the development according to age, race, and sex with considerations as to their etiology and significance. This study showed that 100% of the 400 individuals developed either spondylosis deformans or osteochondrosis by the time they were 40 years old, which was most likely due to historic gender-specific labor distribution.

== Diet and dental health ==
Diet is an important area of study for bioarchaeologists because it can reveal many aspects of an individual and the population. The types of foods that were produced and eaten can yield information on how society was structured, on various settlement patterns, and on how healthy or unhealthy the population was.

Diet is studied through a variety of methods. Bioarchaeologists can examine teeth and look for the presence or absence of dental caries (cavities), use tooth wear analysis, or they can use stable isotope analysis, specifically through carbon and nitrogen isotopes.

=== Dental caries ===
Dental caries is the scientific term for cavities or tooth decay as a result of bacteria fermenting carbohydrates in the mouth. Caries is associated with poor cleaning of the mouth and receding gums that expose the roots of teeth.

A study done on the frequency of dental caries in a medieval population in Southwest France was done by researchers at the Université Paul-Sabatier. They studied 58 adults, both men and women, and found the prevalence of dental caries to be 17.46% with the most frequent types of caries being occlusal or proximal. Additionally, caries was mostly found on the second and third molars in both maxillary and mandibular teeth. The study found no statistically significant difference between the frequencies of caries in men and women but noted that the low levels of caries found overall was most likely due to attrition and noncariogenic foods.

== Stable isotope analysis ==
Stable isotope analysis allows bioarchaeologists to study diet and migration in populations. Analysis of carbon and nitrogen in bone collagen yields information about diet and nutrition while the analysis of strontium and oxygen can reveal migration patterns of individuals. Isotope analyzing can be used to study the food source through δ^{13}C and δ^{15}N values, as a higher in δ^{15}N is an indication of higher reliability on aquatic food source compared to land-based food source. Oxygen signatures can get into teeth before an individual reaches 12 years of age through the consumption of ground water. Variability in mammalian skeletal tissue δ^{18}O levels is caused mainly due to consumption of various foods and water. Different environments like mountain slopes and proximity to coastal areas give varying readings depending on the baseline of the area that can help trace movement. These signatures differ from area to area and the oxygen's signatures in teeth can be compared to signatures in ground water from different regions.

Anna Linderholm and Anna Kjellström, from Stockholm University in Sweden, studied approximately 800 individuals from several medieval cemeteries in Sigtuna, Sweden, to understand social differences between them. One portion of the study was dedicated to using stable isotope analysis on individuals to reveal any dietary differences related to class. The authors used stable isotope analysis on a total of 25 individuals and five animals to aid in their understanding of social differences at these sites. Six of the individuals came from a cemetery on the outskirts of a churchyard where many victims expressed signs of leprosy. This location suggests that these individuals belonged to a lower social stratum. Their results indicated no significant differences in δ^{13}C and δ^{15}N values which means that the individuals buried in the "healthy" regions and those buried in the "unhealthy" regions appeared to have had similar diets.

In 2013, Kristina Killgrove, a classicist and bioarchaeologist, studied individuals from a medieval cemetery site in Berlin, Germany. The cemetery, known as Petriplatz, contained over 3,000 individuals who were buried between the mid-13th century and the mid-18th century. The cemetery was excavated by directors Claudia Melisch and Jamie Sewell between 2007 and 2010. Killgrove analyzed the first molars of 22 individuals from roughly 1200–1300 A.D. and found that three of the individuals showed strontium levels that are two standard deviations outside of the local range. Killgrove concluded that it is possible that two of the individuals migrated to Berlin from west-central Germany and the other migrated from south-central Germany.
