= Buildings archaeology =

Archaeological discipline

Buildings archeology or archaeotecture is a branch of archaeology that focuses on the study of above-ground structures, or elevations, of various types of buildings. These include religious structures (churches, abbeys), civil constructions (houses, apartment buildings, industrial, commercial, and agricultural structures, transportation infrastructure, and hydraulic works), and military edifices (castles, fortifications). The term "archaeology of elevations" reflects its focus on these standing structures, which are typically built with durable materials like stone, though less commonly with perishable materials such as wood or wattle and daub.

== Core principles ==
Archaeology is often associated with excavating subsurface remains, but the archaeology of construction has always included the study of above-ground structures. This discipline involves two primary approaches:

- "Reading the walls" (as described by R. Krautheimer) to identify construction phases, traces of modifications, and transformations. It views buildings as dynamic entities, altered by their inhabitants over time, and aims to reconstruct their history and relative chronology by analyzing structural changes, such as openings, sealed doorways, or raised floors.
- Understanding the process of construction, including how building sites were organized, the techniques used by builders, and the technologies employed.

== Methods ==
Similar to traditional archaeology, every modification or element in a building—floors, plaster, wallpaper, paint, walls, or doors—is treated as a stratigraphic unit. However, in construction archaeology, the stratigraphy is vertical rather than horizontal.

Archaeologists, when time permits (particularly in preventive archaeology, which often imposes tight schedules), conduct a "stone-by-stone" survey of facades to detect construction breaks and phases. Increasingly, they rely on archaeometry, including carbon-14 dating, thermoluminescence, rock identification, and mortar analysis.

Key areas of study include:

- Analysis of stones, including their type, size, shape, bonding patterns, assembly, and geographic origin, as well as identifying masons' marks, scaffolding traces, and tool marks.
- Examination of mortars, plasters, and decorative elements (e.g., frescoes, wall paintings), focusing on their physicochemical composition, colors, history, and significance. The layering of plaster (vertical stratigraphy) reveals different decorative phases and structural modifications, such as the creation or sealing of openings.
- Study of timber frameworks and assembly techniques.

== History ==
The archaeology of construction traces its roots to the 15th century, within classical archaeology, when antiquarians during the Humanist period, such as Cyriac of Ancona, Flavio Biondo, Poggio Bracciolini, Antonio Loschi, and Pomponio Leto, who founded the Accademia Romana in 1466, began studying ancient structures. The antiquarian movement peaked in the 18th century and waned in the late 19th century as archaeology became a distinct scientific discipline, independent of philology or history. This was driven by three pillars: the classification of artifacts through typology, archaeological stratigraphy, and the history of technology.

In France, the French Revolution sparked patriotism and a "sentimental interest" in monuments preserving national memory, exemplified by the establishment of the Musée des Monuments Français by Alexandre Lenoir in 1795. The term "National Antiquities," coined in 1790 by Aubin-Louis Millin in his work Antiquités Nationales ou recueil des monuments qui peuvent servir à l'histoire de France, referred to medieval or modern artworks declared national heritage. Interest in classical archaeology grew alongside enthusiasm for monumental archaeology (focusing on major, often religious, monuments) from the second quarter of the 19th century. Influenced by Romanticism (Victor Hugo's Notre-Dame de Paris, Eugène Viollet-le-Duc, Arcisse de Caumont), the focus shifted from ancient monuments (e.g., amphitheatres, theatres) to medieval ones (e.g., Carcassonne, Fontevraud Abbey).

In France, the discipline was formalized in the 1970s and 1980s, driven by researchers like Nicolas Reveyron, Rollins Guild, Jean-François Reynaud, Daniel Prigent, Catherine Arlaud, Christian Sapin, and Joëlle Burnouf. It is often modestly termed "archéologie du bâti," though some prefer "archaeology of elevations." The variety of terms reflects challenges in defining this approach clearly, both semantically and in practice, as well as in legislative recognition. It emerged from preventive archaeology (also known as preventive archaeology) operations in urban centers, particularly during renovations of protected historic buildings, and distinguished itself from monumental archaeology through its methods, focusing on four approaches: the archaeology of construction materials, techniques of material implementation, interior and exterior fittings, and three-dimensional spatial studies to understand architectural choices and modifications.

== Medieval construction archaeology ==
Construction archaeology is extensively applied to the medieval period, where a greater number of standing structures survive compared to earlier eras. Both civil and religious buildings, whether well-preserved or in ruins, provide rich insights into their design and construction techniques.

Textual sources, such as notarial deeds and accounting records, vary by region and period but can offer detailed information about construction and maintenance. Combining these written sources with archaeological evidence enables a detailed reconstruction of medieval buildings. For example, construction accounts can clarify missing parts of a structure (e.g., upper sections or lost walls) or details like the presence of glass windows or painted plaster. Material studies (stone, wood, earth) reveal the economics of construction sites, while archaeological remains address gaps in textual records, identifying tools, techniques, and the evolution of a building over time.

== Construction archaeology and restoration ==
As noted by René Dinkel, author of L'Encyclopédie du patrimoine, conservators and architects are often challenged by the diversity of techniques and the heterogeneity of walls. Traditional decorative criteria alone can lead to oversimplifications, such as assuming older walls are beautifully crafted with neatly cut stones, while later ones are rougher. Modern research by art historians and archaeologists provides a more nuanced chronology of forms, guiding restoration efforts based on construction techniques.

Analysis focuses on changes in masonry patterns, repairs, or seams, establishing a relative chronology that serves as the architectural history of a monument, even without written records. Preserving original facades is critical, avoiding excessive new stone, aggressive cleaning that erases tool marks, or inappropriate plastering. Comprehensive sanitary and archaeological analysis is essential not only for walls but also for foundations and surroundings, particularly for semi-troglodytic sites or those with altered bases, where geological and archaeological study is crucial. (Note: Examples include studies of Fleckenstein and Petit-Koenigsbourg (Bas-Rhin) by the Centre d'étude des châteaux-forts, commissioned by the DRAC-Conservation régionale des monuments historiques d'Alsace.)

Detailed documentation, compiled by independent researchers, study centers, or organizations like the Société française d'archéologie, the Centre d'étude des châteaux forts, or GRAHAL, includes chronologies, historical summaries, analytical reports, and iconographic collections. These serve as essential references for any intervention on a building or site.

== Documentation and planning ==
Restoration projects require detailed surveys conducted by archaeologists, architectural historians, or skilled restorers. Statistical studies of masonry, such as those at Fontevraud Abbey, Otterberg Abbey in the Palatinate, and the Montpellier region, exemplify recommended approaches.

Accurate documentation is vital to support archaeological analysis of walls, ensuring a reliable record for future study and intervention.

== Recommendations of 1849 by the Commission des Arts et Édifices Religieux ==
On 26 February 1849, the Commission des Arts et Édifices Religieux, including Eugène Viollet-le-Duc and Prosper Mérimée, issued guidelines emphasizing the need for thorough structural analysis before restoration. Architects were urged to study the style and construction of monuments to understand their weaknesses and appropriate repair methods. For example, Romanesque buildings north of the Loire, built until the late 12th century with small stones and poorly bonded walls, required cautious repairs due to weak internal fill. In contrast, 13th- and 14th-century structures, with well-bonded, thin walls, should retain degraded surfaces rather than replace them with shallow stones. For 15th-century buildings, often made of soft stone in large blocks, maintaining original dimensions was critical to stability.

The commission noted that monuments from the same period and region share similarities due to shared materials and practices, urging architects to study local churches alongside major cathedrals to inform restoration.

== See also ==
- Archaeometry
- Building material
- Conservation and restoration doctrines and techniques
- History of architecture
- Medieval archaeology
- Stratigraphy (archaeology)

== Bibliography ==
- Arlaud, Catherine; Burnouf, Joëlle (1993). "L'archéologie du bâti médiéval urbain" [Urban medieval construction archaeology]. Les Nouvelles de l'archéologie (in French) (53–54).
- Aceto, Francesco (1996). Chantiers médiévaux [Medieval construction sites] (in French). Paris: Desclée de Brouwer. p. 364.
- Bessac, Jean-Claude (1986). L'outillage traditionnel du tailleur de pierre de l'Antiquité à nos jours [Traditional stonecutting tools from antiquity to the present] (in French). Paris: Editions du Centre national de la recherche scientifique. p. 319. ISBN 9782222036074.
- Dinkel, René (1997). L'Encyclopédie du patrimoine (Monuments historiques, Patrimoine bâti et naturel : Protection, restauration, réglementation. Doctrines : Techniques) [The encyclopedia of heritage (Historic monuments, built and natural heritage: Protection, restoration, regulation. Doctrines: Techniques)] (in French). Paris: Éditions Les Encyclopédies du patrimoine. p. 1512. ISBN 978-2-911200-00-7. "Chapter II "Lumières sur les pierres", pp. 33–51; Notices "Analyse archéologique des murs", p. 385, and "Archéologie", pp. 392–393"
- Journot, Florence (1999). "Archéologie du bÂti". L'archéologie du bâti, la construction en pierre [Construction archaeology, stone building] (in French). Paris: Éditions Errance. pp. 133–150.
- Parron-Kontis, Isabelle; Reveyron, Nicolas (2005). Archéologie du bâti : Pour une harmonie des méthodes [Construction archaeology: Toward a harmony of methods] (in French). Paris: Errance. p. 160. ISBN 2-87772-296-1. Archived from the original on 18 June 2022.
- Reveyron, Nicolas (23 April 2012). "L'apport de l'archéologie du bâti dans la monographie d'architecture" [The contribution of construction archaeology to architectural monographs]. In Situ (2). doi:10.4000/insitu.1200. Archived from the original on 27 December 2017.
- Vanetti, Alice (2021). Archéologie du bâti: Histoire et épistémologie des origines à nos jours (France, Italie, Suisse) [Construction archaeology: History and epistemology from its origins to the present (France, Italy, Switzerland)]. Supplément à la revue archéologie de l'Est (in French). Vol. 51. Dijon: Presses universitaires de Dijon. p. 298. ISBN 978-2-36441-387-0.
- Bibliothèque municipale de Lyon (1997). Au fil du chantier. Archéologie de la construction au Moyen Âge [Through the construction site: Archaeology of medieval construction] (in French). Lyon: CERIAH-Bibliothèque Municipale de Lyon. p. 77.
- Reveyron, Nicolas (2000). "Comment construisait-on au Moyen Âge ?" [How was construction done in the Middle Ages?]. Les dossiers d'archéologie (in French) (251). ISBN 978-2-916125-46-6. Archived from the original on 2 June 2018.
- Mouton, Benjamin (1993). Méthodes d'analyse destructives et non destructives pour les structures historiques [Destructive and non-destructive analysis methods for historic structures] (in French). Paris: Direction du patrimoine. Archived from the original on 10 March 2022.
- L'échantillon archéologique : du prélèvement à l'interprétation des résultats d'analyse archéométrique [The archaeological sample: From collection to interpretation of archaeometric analysis results]. École thématique (in French). Valbonne: Centre de recherche archéologique du CNRS. 1999.
