= Italia in Miniatura =

Miniature park in Rimini, Italy

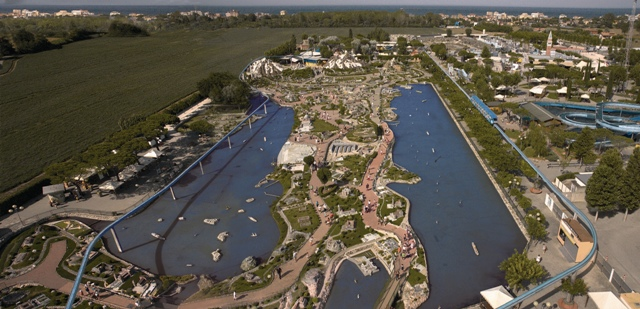
- Aerial view of the park, June 2012
- Interactive map of Italia in Miniatura
- Location: Viserba, Emilia-Romagna, Italy
- Coordinates: 44°5′24.38″N 12°30′50.53″E
- Public transit: Route 8 bus
- Opened: 4 July 1970
- Owner: Costa Edutainment SpA
- Theme: Miniature park
- Attendance: c. 500,000 annually
- Area: 85,000 m^{2} (910,000 sq ft)
- Website: www.italiainminiatura.com

Italia in Miniatura (lit. 'Italy in Miniature') is a miniature park in Viserba, a frazione of Rimini in the region of Emilia-Romagna, northern Italy.

Opened on 4 July 1970, Italia in Miniatura is Italy's fourth-oldest theme park, and attracts 500,000 visitors per year. It features 273 polyurethane models over an outdoor area of 85,000 square metres (910,000 sq ft). As well as Italian monuments, the models include European landmarks and geographic features such as mountains and volcanoes. A 1:5 reproduction of 119 buildings in Venice can be traversed with a gondola ride along the Grand Canal. Other attractions include a driving school, a suspended monorail, interactive spaces dedicated to science education, a parrot aviary, hot air balloons, a log flume, and a Pinocchio-themed train ride.

The park is located on the SS16 state road between Rimini and Ravenna, on the ancient Via Popilia. It occasionally hosts evenings with late closing hours in the summer. The park is owned by Costa Edutainment SpA, who also own the Aquarium of Cattolica and the Aquafan water park in Riccione.

== History ==
The miniature park was founded by Ivo Rambaldi, a plumber from Ravenna. After visiting Swissminiatur, a miniature park near Lugano, Switzerland, in 1968, Rambaldi was inspired to create an Italian counterpart; he documented his visit on film and began working on the park in his home garage with Sergio Fabbri, his brother-in-law and a modelmaker, and Paolo, his son and a student at an institute of surveyors. Rambaldi travelled 27,000 kilometres (17,000 mi) to visit and measure monuments, taking over 6,200 photographs. The first models were monuments from Ravenna: Tomb of Dante, the Capanno Garibaldi, and Sant'Apollinare in Classe, which Rambaldi modelled five times. As the project grew, the workshop moved to a warehouse of Rambaldi's elder brother, Anselmo, and reached sixteen craftsmen. The partners decided to site the park in Viserba for its convenience to the SS16 state road, having previously considered sites near the SS72 state road to San Marino and a site adjacent to the Misano World Circuit. The park cost 300 million lire to build.

Italia in Miniatura opened on 4 July 1970; its inauguration was notable for its rain. It was the fourth theme park to open in Italy after Perugia's Città della Domenica, Naples' Edenlandia (1965), and Fiabilandia (1966), also in Rimini. Local residents saw the attraction as part of the 1960s Americanisation of the seaside resort. At the time of its inauguration, it numbered between 49 and 61 models, many of monuments from Emilia-Romagna, over an outdoor area of 20,000 square metres (220,000 sq ft).

In May 2012, a Sammarinese association suggested that the park could move to a 300,000-square-metre (3,200,000 sq ft) state-owned agricultural area in Cinque Vie, citing the park's continued threat to relocate from Viserba given its difficulties in acquiring adjacent land.

In March 2014, Costa Edutainment SpA rented the park from the Rambaldi family, with the option to purchase the park after two years, in a deal valued at between €15 million and €16 million. Costa had already acquired the Aquarium of Cattolica in 2000 and Aquafan in Riccione in 2013. On 15 April 2015, the previous management company was declared bankrupt after accumulating liabilities exceeding €1.5 million. Its directors were investigated by the Guardia di Finanza for diverting over €500,000 away from creditors, and were acquitted by the Court of Forlì on 24 April 2019.

The park was renovated between 2018 and 2021, at a cost of €3 million, featuring new attractions Esperimenta, Pinocchio and Pappamondo, and a new entrance with fountains and a statue of a child that is 10 metres (33 ft) tall.

On 6 August 2021, to celebrate its fiftieth anniversary, the park offered free entry to 1,000 Riminese residents. Among its guests were Stefano Bonaccini, President of Emilia-Romagna, senators Marco Croatti and Sergio Romagnoli, poet Beppe Costa, and media personalities Lia Celi and Kleidi Kadiu.

== Features ==
The park's grounds include 10,000 plants, half of which are real miniature trees. Its canals are filled with 2,500 cubic metres (88,000 cu ft) of water. Eighteen model trains operate in the park.

Italia in Miniatura features three restaurants and several kiosks for snacks and ice creams, as well as a picnic area.

=== Models ===
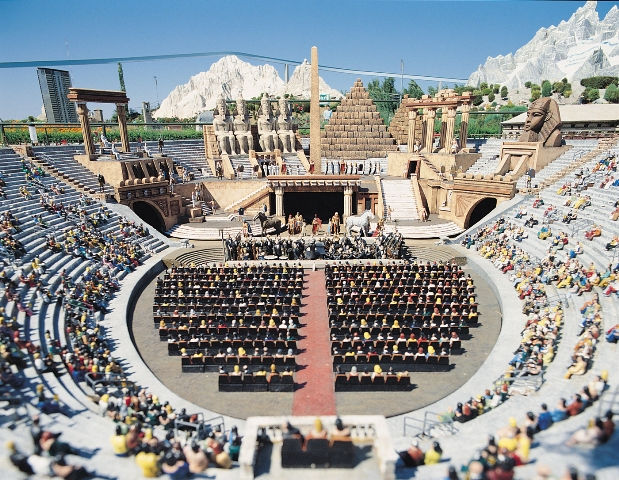
The model of Verona Arena, June 2012

The park consists of 273 miniatures over an outdoor area of 85,000 square metres (910,000 sq ft). Most of the models are of scale 1:25 (like Sant'Apollinare in Classe), 1:33 (like Pisa's Piazza dei Miracoli), and 1:50 (like Milan Cathedral). The models are made of polyurethane, which is resistant to the weather. The models are decorated with figurines of people. While most models are of Italian landmarks, a European section includes models from European capitals. Natural features including rivers, waterfalls, and volcanoes are also modelled.

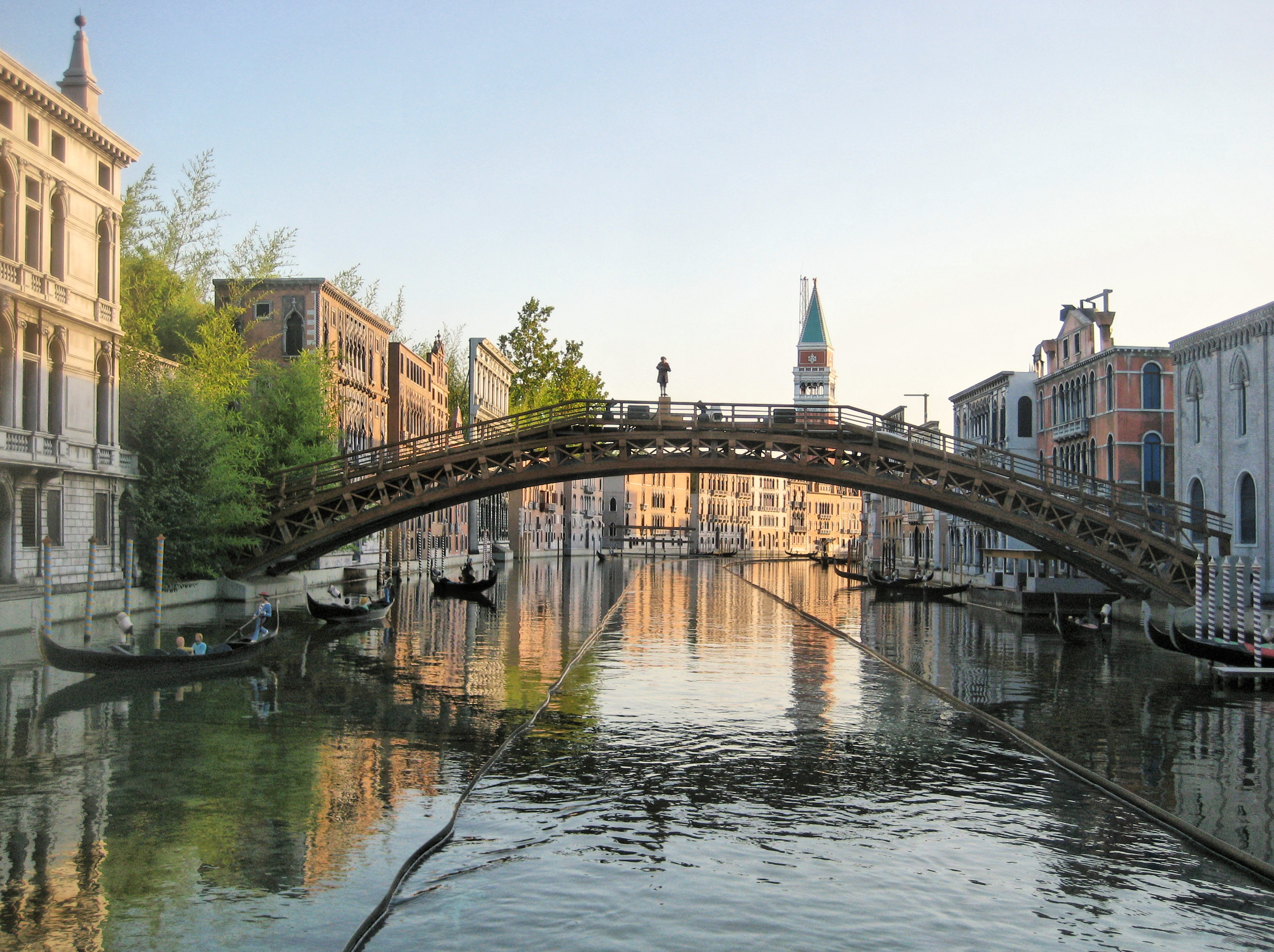
The Venice sector, July 2009

Among notable models, the park features a 1:5 reproduction of 119 buildings in Venice, with a surface area of 6,600 square metres (71,000 sq ft). St Mark's Campanile reaches a height of 20 metres (66 ft). Visitors can ride a gondola through the reproduction of the Grand Canal, with an audio guide from Giacomo Casanova. The Venetian sector took nine years to construct.

Cannonacqua is a 1:3 reproduction of Rimini's Castel Sismondo. The castle occupies 1,600 square metres (17,000 sq ft), its towers reaching a height of 7 metres (23 ft), and is equipped with 32 water cannons.

Buttons animate some scenes, such as a performance of Giuseppe Verdi's Aida at the Verona Arena, a fire in Porto Marghera, and the opening of the Ponte Girevole swingbridge.

List of modelled landmarks by region
Region	Landmarks
Aosta Valley	Matterhorn, Mont Blanc, Aosta: Arch of Augustus, Fénis: Fénis Castle
Apulia	Alberobello: Trulli, Andria: Castel del Monte, Bari: Bari Cathedral, Taranto: Ponte Girevole, Trani: Trani Cathedral
Campania	Caserta: Reggia di Caserta, Paestum: Second Temple of Hera
Emilia-Romagna	Bologna: Towers of Bologna, Busseto: Villa Verdi, Codigoro: Pomposa Abbey, Ravenna: Capanno Garibaldi, Sant'Apollinare in Classe, Tomb of Dante, Reggio Emilia: Sala del Tricolore, Rimini: Arch of Augustus, Castel Sismondo, San Leo: Forte di San Leo, Ferrara: Castello Estense, Palazzo Municipale
Europe	Athens: Acropolis, Lisbon: Belém Tower, Paris: Trocadéro
Friuli-Venezia Giulia	Trieste: Trieste Cathedral
Lazio	Rome: Colosseum, St Peter's Basilica
Liguria	Genoa: Old Harbour, Aquarium of Genoa
Lombardy	Milan: Castello Sforzesco, Milan Cathedral, Pirelli Tower
Piedmont	Arona: Sancarlone, Turin: Mole Antonelliana
Sardinia	Nuraghe of Sardinia
Sicily	Agrigento: Temple of Juno, Catania: Castello Ursino
South Tyrol	Tre Cime di Lavaredo
Tuscany	Florence: Florence Cathedral, Palazzo Vecchio, Pisa: Leaning Tower of Pisa, Piazza dei Miracoli, Pisa Baptistery
Umbria	Gubbio: Palazzo del Capitano
Veneto	Venice: Doge's Palace, Grand Canal, Piazza San Marco, Porto Marghera, Rialto Bridge, St Mark's Campanile, Verona: Verona Arena

=== Attractions ===
Particularly on special evenings, the park hosts live shows by street artists, acrobats, dancers, singers, and musicians. Piazza Italia, a square in the park, hosts many such events.

The park's attractions include:

- AreAvventura, a tree-climbing activity area
- Cinemagia 7D, an immersive cinematic experience
- Esperimenta, a pavilion dedicated to physics opened in 2021.
- Giostra Cavalli, a carousel
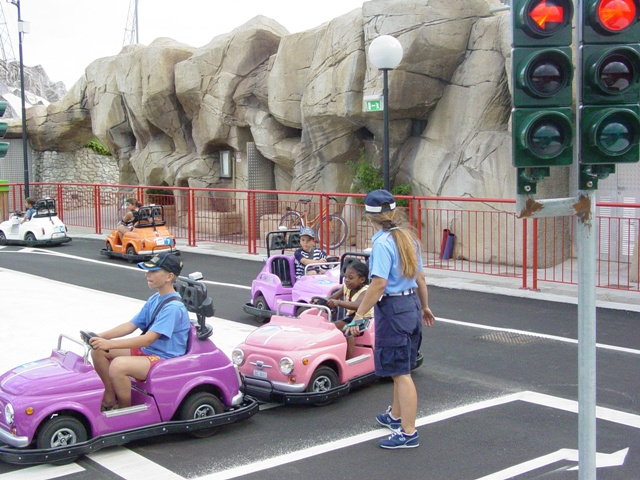
- The Scuola Guida Interattiva, June 2012
  Scuola Guida Interattiva (Interactive Driving School). Measuring 1,300-square-metre (14,000 sq ft), visitors aged 6 to 12 can learn to drive a Fiat 500 through a virtual instructor for printed licences. The attraction has been powered by clean energy since 2010.
- Monorotaia. The park's 730-metre (2,400 ft) monorail is electrified with 12 motors each producing 4 horsepower using alternating current. The 30-metre (98 ft) train accommodates up to 70 people in 12 carriages, reaching a maximum speed of 12 kilometres per hour (7.5 mph). The monorail is suspended in the air, on average 6 metres (20 ft) above the ground.
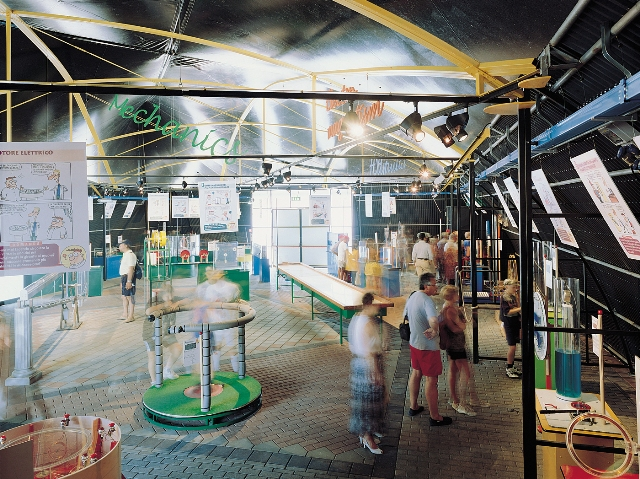
- The Luna Park della Scienza, June 2012
  Luna Park della Scienza (Scientific Luna Park). The 420-square-metre (4,500 sq ft) pavilion hosts educational scientific exhibitions in 10 sections, with interactive laboratories with experimental technologies.
- Pappamondo. Opened in 2021, Pappamondo is a parrot aviary.
- Pinocchio. Opened in 2021, the Pinocchio attraction features a train ride through places and characters inspired by Carlo Collodi's Pinocchio, including Mangiafuoco's theatre.
- Play Mart, a ballpark
- Sling Shot. Modelled as a slingshot, the attraction propels visitors 55 metres (180 ft) into the air.
- Torre Panoramica (Panoramic Tower), a hot air balloon ride with 80,000 miniature figures of visitors to the park
- Vecchia Segheria (Old Sawmill), a log flume

== Transport ==
Start Romagna SpA's route 8 bus serves Italia in Miniatura; the route runs between Rimini's city centre and Viserba railway station. The park is located on the SS16 state road between Rimini and Ravenna, on the ancient Via Popilia. It is accessed from the Rimini Nord exit of the A14 tolled highway.

== Incidents ==
On 26 April 2010, a 46-year-old woman died after disembarking the Sling Shot attraction.

On 2 April 2015, the monorail stopped mid-air with 36 passengers, who were safely rescued by Rimini's fire brigade.

== In popular culture ==
The music video for "Tanti auguri", a 1978 single by Raffaella Carrà, was filmed at Italia in Miniatura. In June 2022, the park featured in the music video of Tuca Tuca Remix, a single by Carmen Russo and Enzo Paolo Turchi in homage to Carrà following her death the previous year.

From the end of the 1970s, the photographer Luigi Ghirri began visiting the park frequently, which he believed resonated with his work on the relationship between fiction and reality. Ghirri took 220 photographs of the park, which he first exhibited in 1979.

== Image gallery ==
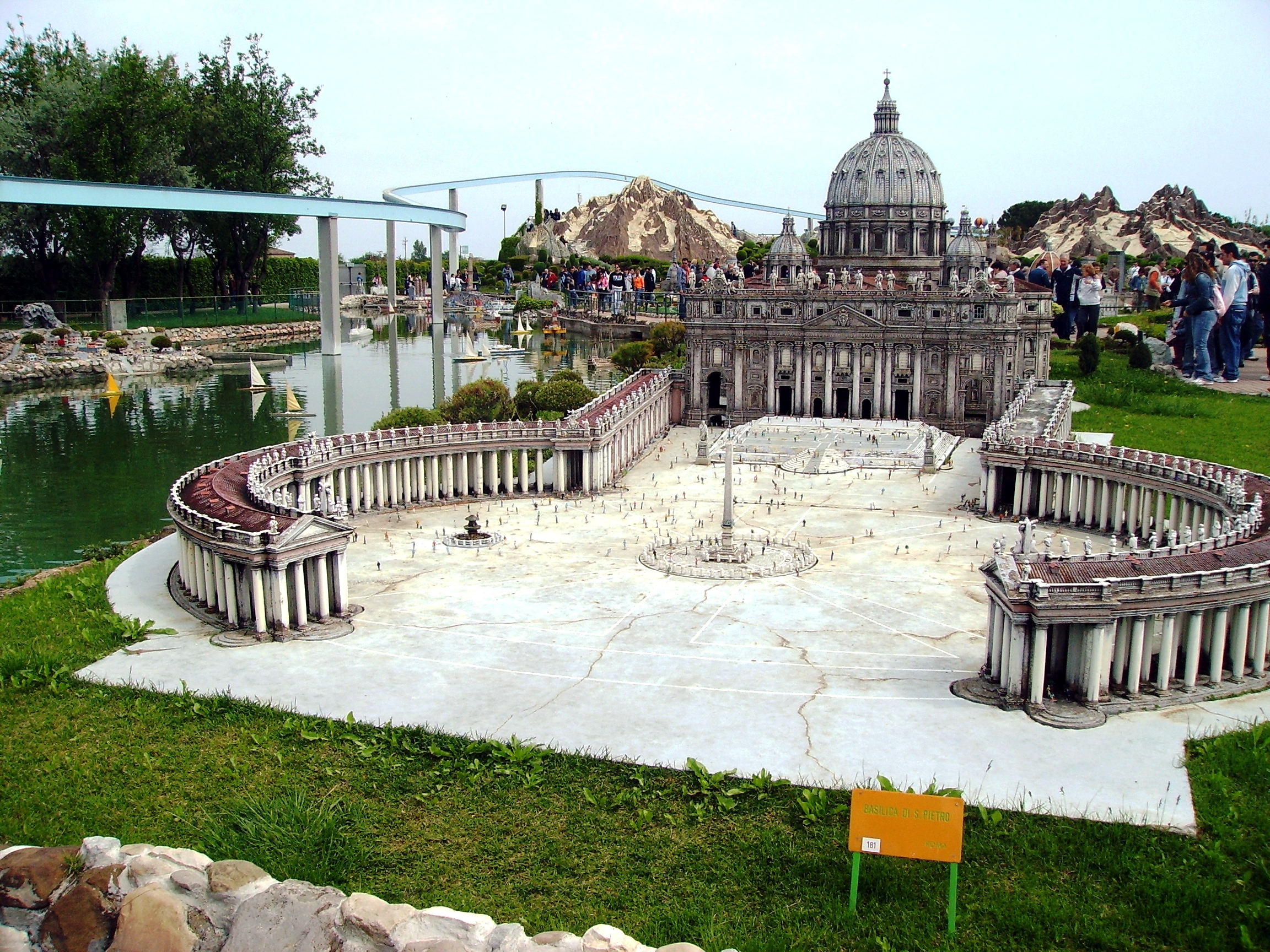
Saint Peter's Square in Rome

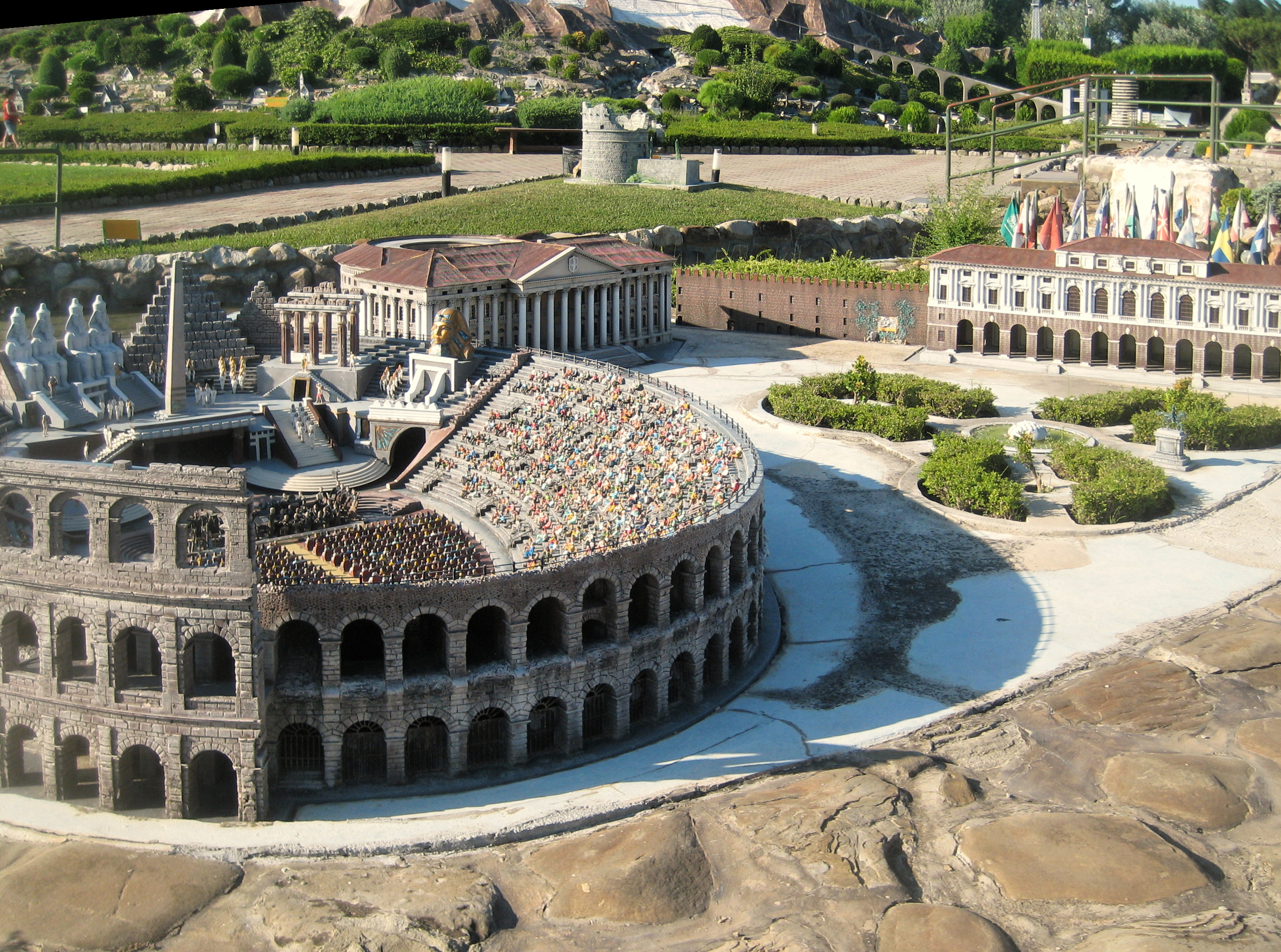
Verona Arena

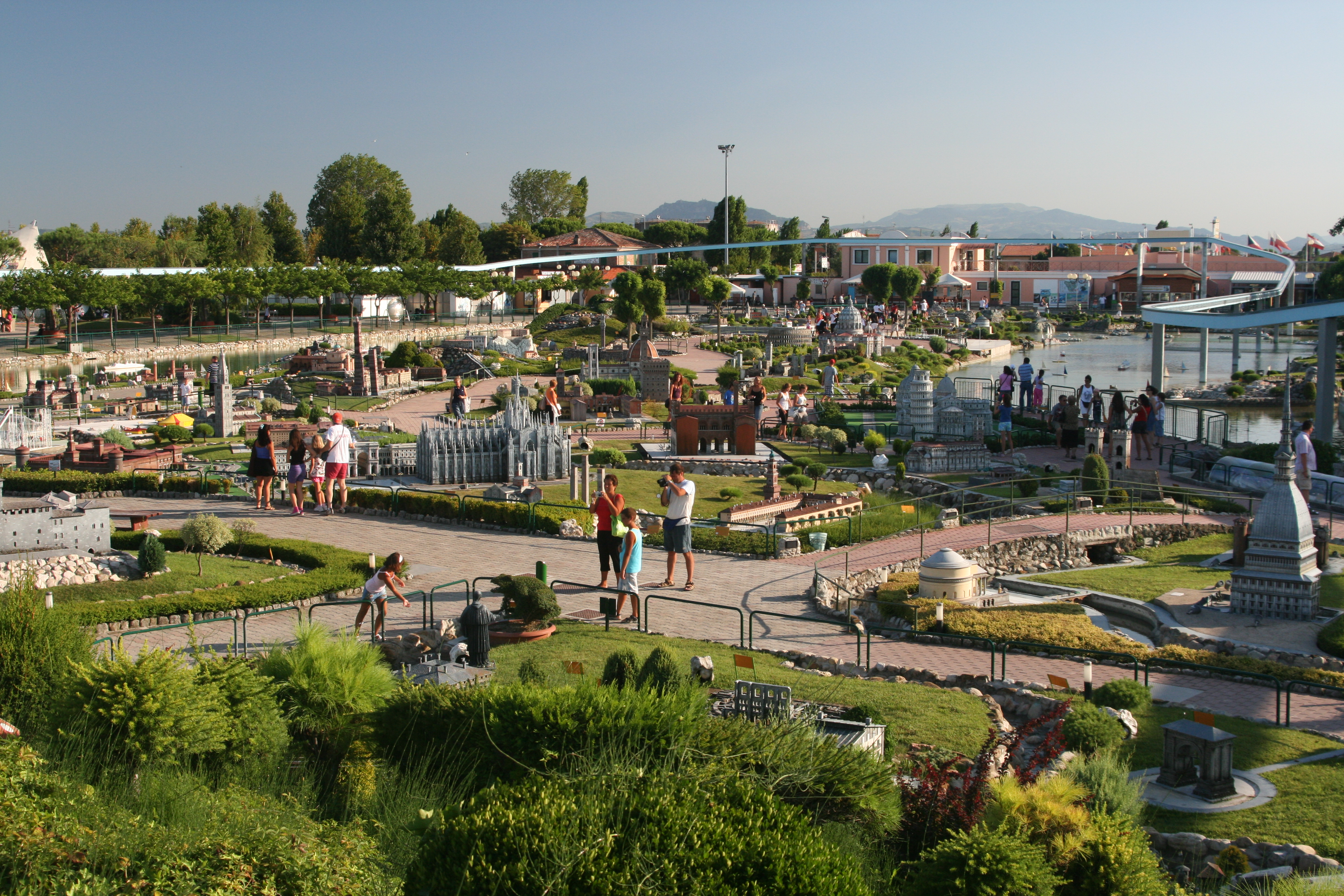
View over the park to the entrance

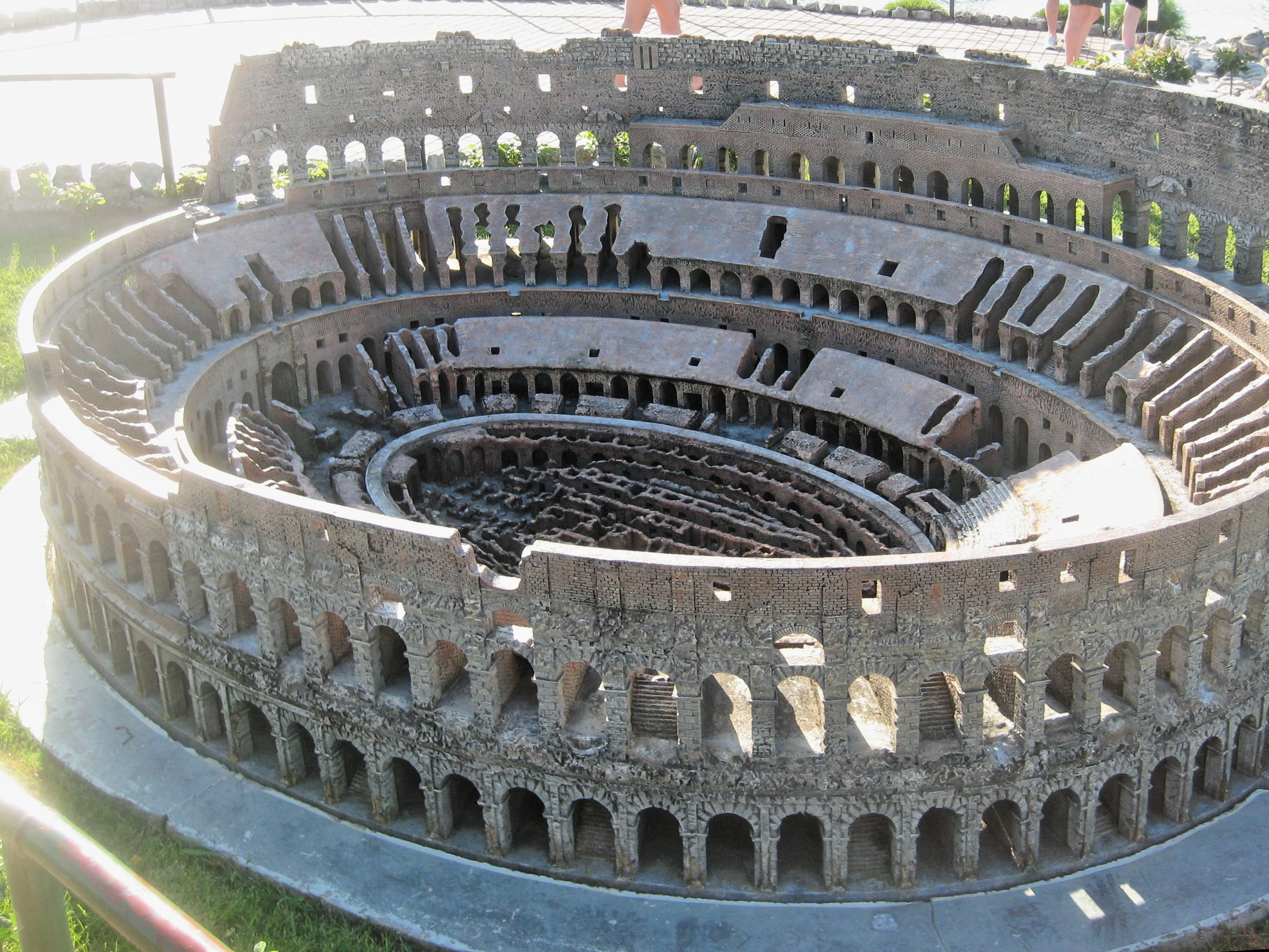
Colosseum

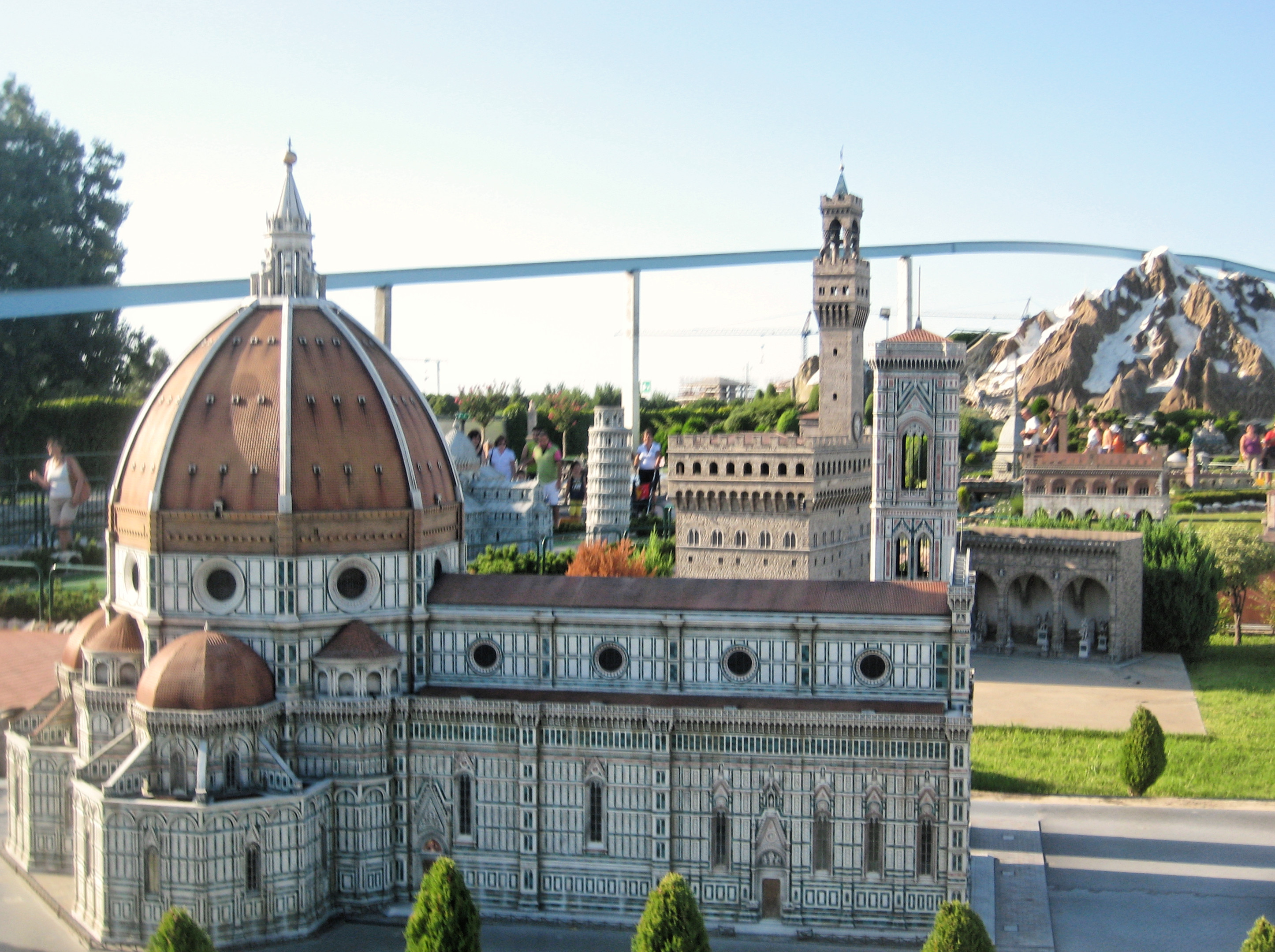
Florence Cathedral

== See also ==
- France Miniature – a miniature park in Élancourt, France
