= Pasquale Ricci =

Pasquale Ricci may refer to:

- Francesco Pasquale Ricci (1732–1817), Italian composer
- Giuseppe Pasquale Ricci (died 1791), government official in the Habsburg port of Trieste
