= Cattolica =

Cattolica Catòlga (Romagnol)
- Comune
- Comune di Cattolica
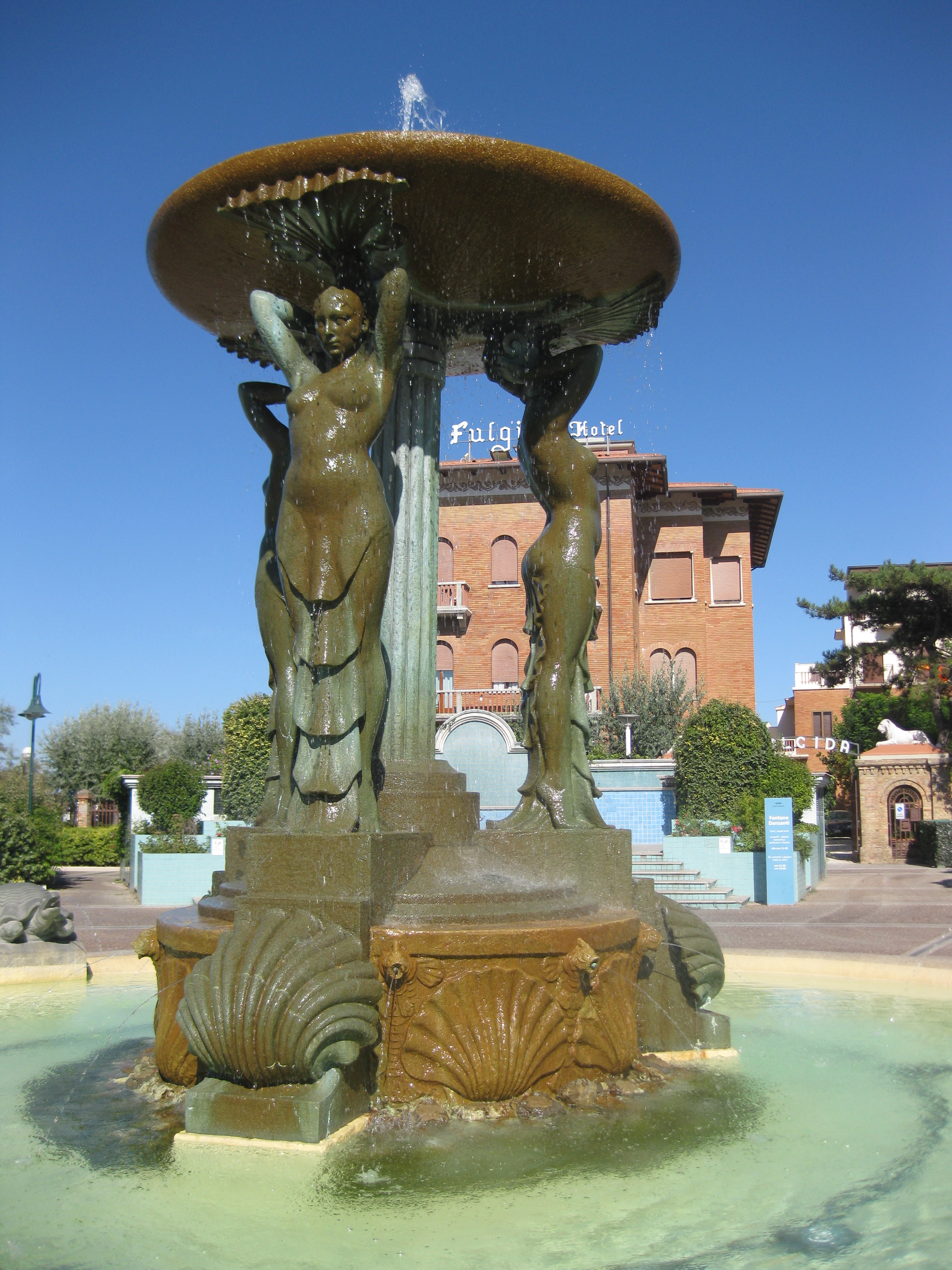
- The Fountain of Sirens

- Flag Coat of arms

- Location within Italy Location within Emilia-Romagna
- Coordinates: 43°58′N 12°44′E
- Country: Italy
- Region: Emilia-Romagna
- Province: Rimini (RN)

Government
  - Mayor: Franca Foronchi (Partito Democratico)

Area
  - Total: 5 km^{2} (1.9 sq mi)
- Elevation: 12 m (39 ft)

Population (30-06-2017)
  - Total: 17,228
  - Density: 3,400/km^{2} (8,900/sq mi)
- Demonym: Cattolichini
- Time zone: UTC+1 (CET)
  - Summer (DST): UTC+2 (CEST)
- Postal code: 47841
- Dialing code: 0541
- Patron saint: St. Pius V
- Saint day: 30 April
- Website: Official website

Cattolica (Italian: [katˈtɔːlika]; Romagnol: Catòlga) is a town and comune in the Province of Rimini, Italy, with 16,233 inhabitants as of 2007.

== History ==
Archaeological excavations show that the area was already settled in Roman times.

According to one legend, Cattolica received its name after Gaudentius of Rimini, with seventeen other bishops, retreated to the settlement during the closing stages of the Council of Ariminum, before Gaudentius' martyrdom. Cattolica rose as a resting place for pilgrims who traveled the Bologna-Ancona-Rome route, on their way to the sanctuary of Loreto or to St. Peter's in Rome. In 1500, it counted more than twenty taverns and inns.

Under the Kingdom of Italy, on 5 December 1895, Cattolica gained municipal autonomy; it was previously a village within the jurisdiction of the municipality of San Giovanni.

Only from the second half of the 19th century did the fishing industry became relevant in the economy of the town.

One of the first notable visitors to Cattolica's beach was Lucien Bonaparte, brother of the French Emperor, who preferred it to noisy Rimini, in 1823. The town became an independent commune in 1896.

After the end of World War I the tourism industry became predominant.

== Main sights ==
- Church of San Apollinare (13th century)
- Torre Malatestiana (Malatesta tower) (1490)
- Museo della Regina di Cattolica archaeological museum
- S. Croce Gallery (16th century)
- Watchtower (now included in a closed disco)
- Le Navi, Aquarium of Cattolica

== People ==
- Cesare Pronti (1626–1708), painter
- Emilio Filippini (1870–1938), painter
- Guido Morganti (1891–1954), Righteous Among the Nations
- Egidio Renzi (1900–1944), martyr of Fosse Ardeatine
- Domenico Rasi (1924–1944), patriot
- Vanzio Spinelli (1924–1944), patriot
- Giuseppe Ricci,(1890-1972) politician
- Enrico Molari, motorcycle racer
- Giovanna Filippini, politician
- Eraldo Pecci, (1955) footballer
- Alberta Ferretti (1950), fashion designer
- Umberto Paolucci (1944), Director of Microsoft Europe
- Vincenzo Cecchini (1934), painter
- Samuele Bersani (1970), singer
- Guido Paolucci (1932-2006), doctor
- Gianluca Magi, writer
- Marco Simoncelli (1987–2011), motorcycle racer
- Giampiero Ticchi (1959), basketball coach
- Andrea Cinciarini, basketball player
- Luca Leardini, pilot
- Niccolò Antonelli, motorcycle racer
- Mauro Piani (1959), yachtsman Azzurra
- Andrea Migno, motorcycle racer
- Riccardo Raffaelli, Public figure

== International relations ==
Cattolica is twinned with:

- Cortina d'Ampezzo, Italy
- Hodonín, Czech Republic
- Saint-Dié-des-Vosges, France
- Faches-Thumesnil, France
- Debrecen, Hungary

== Events ==
- The feast of Stella Maris: fishing vessels and vongolaie leads in the midst of the sea, the statue of the Virgin Mary "Stella Maris", after a religious procession.
- The Festival of the flowers: since 1950s, Cattolica hosts a show of flower markets with many stalls along the streets of the city.
- The Pink Night, celebrated in town along the coast from Cattolica to Bellaria. It is a festival which is celebrated in June–July and is quite recent: the opportunity for all the shops, bars and restaurants adorn the premises of pink, with dancing to the beach and dive into the sea at midnight.
- The Fair of the ancient flavors of land and sea, with local wine tasting acoompagnate animations and concerts.
- International Mystery Film Festival of Cattolica (known in Italian as Festival internazionale del giallo e del mistero di Cattolica but internationally mostly known by its commonly used abbreviation "MystFest" (it).

== Languages and dialects ==
In addition to Italian, in Cattolica a local variant of the Romagnolo dialect is spoken. Even though it is located right next to Marche, this is not considered a border area from a linguistic point of view, since the dialect spoken across the border is classified within the Emilia-Romagna continuum.

== Theatre ==
The "Teatro della Regina" offers a full season of performances with many different genres during the year. Also in Snaporaz cinema theatre shows and artistic performances are held.
