= Capanno Garibaldi =

Historic hunting cabin in Ravenna, Italy

Garibaldi's Hut
- Italian: Capanno Garibaldi
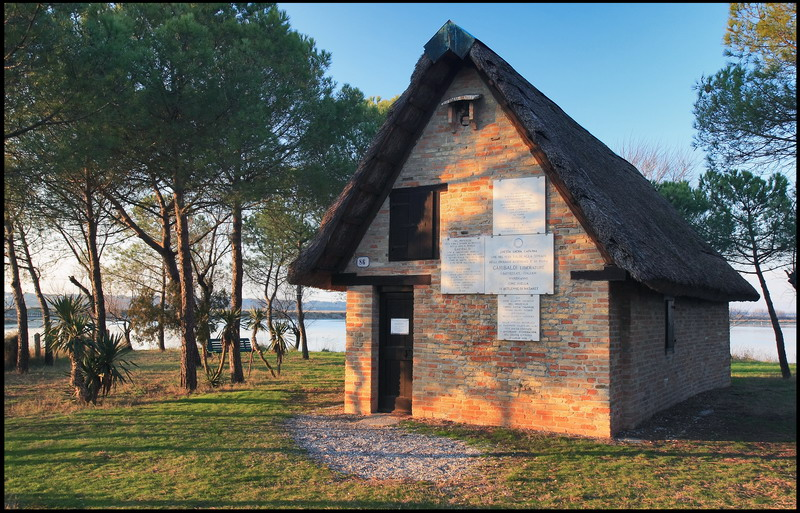
- The Capanno Garibaldi in January 2007
- Interactive map of the Garibaldi's Hut area
- Former names: Il Pontaccio

General information
- Type: Hunting cabin
- Location: via Baiona, Ravenna, Emilia-Romagna, Italy
- Coordinates: 44°28′35.40″N 12°14′47.55″E
- Named for: Giuseppe Garibaldi
- Completed: 1810
- Renovated: 1834, 1844, 1911
- Operator: Società Conservatrice del Capanno Garibaldi

Technical details
- Floor count: 2

Website
- capannogaribaldi.it

The Capanno Garibaldi (lit. 'Garibaldi's Hut') is a hunting cabin 8 kilometres (5.0 mi) north of Ravenna, in the region of Emilia-Romagna, northern Italy, known for having sheltered Italian revolutionary Giuseppe Garibaldi on the night of 6–7 August 1849, during his escape from Italy after the fall of the short-lived Roman Republic.

Originally constructed in 1810, in the delta wetlands between Ravenna and Porto Corsini, the hut was rebuilt in 1834 and 1844. In 1879, the Capanno Garibaldi Conservation Society (Italian: Società Conservatrice del Capanno Garibaldi) was founded to preserve the hut's historical legacy. The hut was rebuilt after being damaged by a fire in 1911.

The Capanno Garibaldi features on regional tourist itineraries, especially those of Garibaldi's life, and hosts local celebrations for Garibaldi and the Risorgimento.

== History ==
=== Construction and early years ===
On 5 January 1810, the Kingdom of Italy's director of state property granted Giuseppe Roncuzzi, a local priest, permission to build a hut, to be used as a hunting cabin within the Pontaccio swamp. The original hut, which came to be known as Il Pontaccio, was built with reeds and oak wood, plastered with clay. The hut is located 8 kilometres (5.0 mi) north of Ravenna, in the delta wetlands on the road to Porto Corsini.

In the decades following Roncuzzi's death in 1818, the hut passed through various local owners. On 20 September 1834, it was destroyed by a fire, after which it was rebuilt. In 1844, the hut was rebuilt with brick and limestone walls.

=== Garibaldi's stay ===
In August 1849, following the collapse of the short-lived Roman Republic, revolutionary Giuseppe Garibaldi and his followers fled Rome while being chased by the Austrian Empire, an escape known as the Trafila Garibaldina. Having passed through San Marino, on his way to safety in Venice, several of Garibaldi's party were captured and executed in Comacchio. Garibaldi's wife, Anita, died on the journey on 4 August. With the Austrian party several kilometres behind Garibaldi, he could not stay for her burial.

On the night of 6–7 August, on the road from Comacchio to Ravenna, Garibaldi sheltered in Il Pontaccio with several disciples, including Giovanni Battista Culiolo. They broke into the locked hut. The following morning, one of Garibaldi's followers recruited a local man, Luigi Sanzani, nicknamed Mezzanotte (lit. 'Midnight'), to help the fugitives. Mezzanotte recognised Garibaldi and agreed to deliver a letter to the patriots in Ravenna, with whom Garibaldi's party had lost contact. Despite being questioned and beaten by Austrians on the road, Mezzanotte did not betray Garibaldi, and delivered the letter. Having reconnected with the patriots in Ravenna, Garibaldi's party left the Pontaccio to continue its journey at 7:30 p.m.

=== Conservation ===
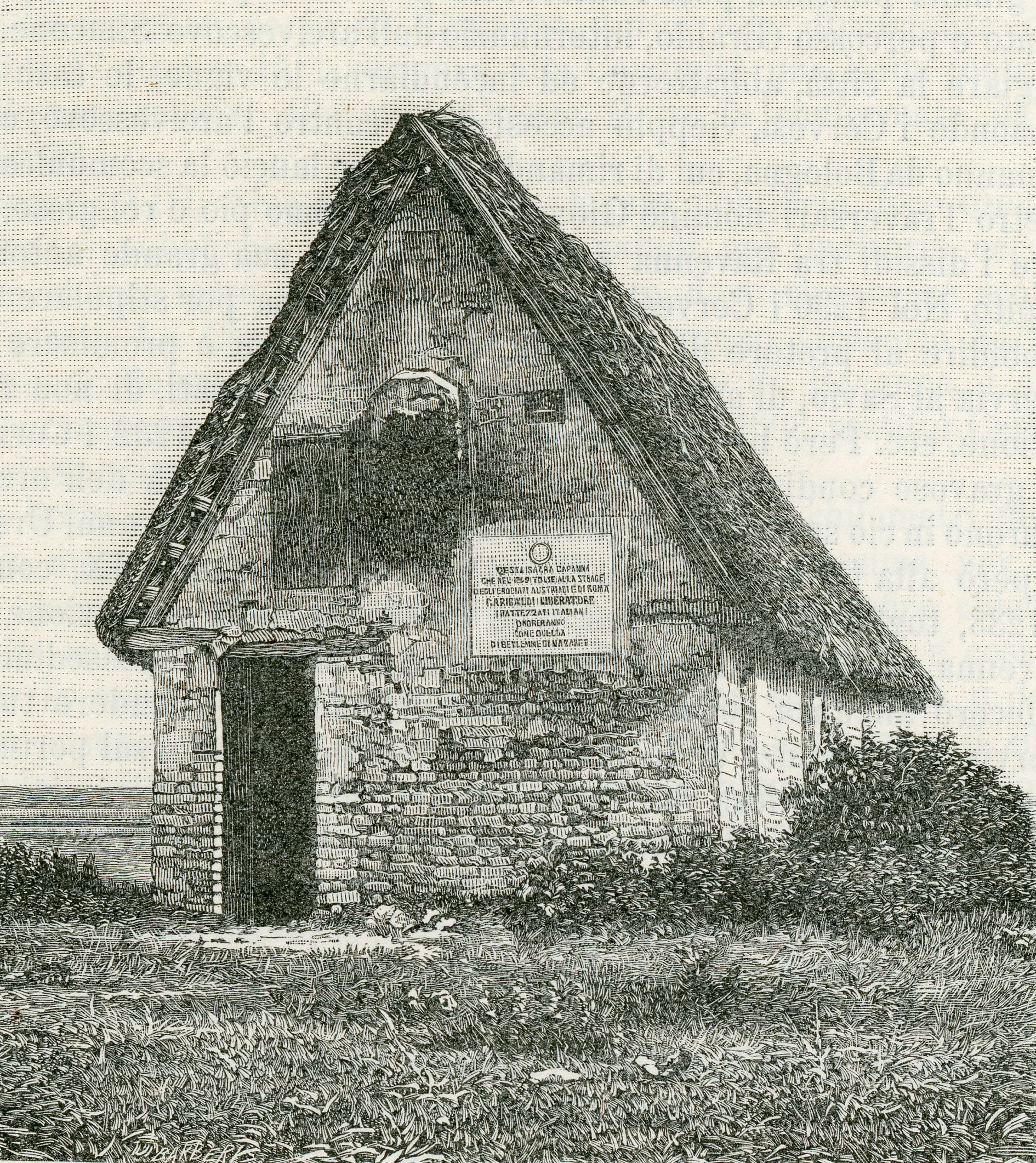
Giuseppe Barberis' 1900 illustration of the Capanno Garibaldi

On 20 August 1867, an association called the Democratic Union (Italian: Unione Democratica) purchased the shed for 150 lire, with a view to preserving its history. The Democratic Union dissolved in 1874; in 1879, some former members founded a successor organisation, the Capanno Garibaldi Conservation Society (Società Conservatrice del Capanno Garibaldi).

On 29 March 1882, Primo Uccellini, who had collected soldiers' testimonies about Garibaldi's stay, passed away. Uccellini's death prompted Ravenna's municipal government to agree to purchase the Capanno Garibaldi on 5 October of the same year, culminating in the approval of the conservation society's statutes on 21 October.

On the night of 3–4 November 1911, the hut was set alight, partially destroying it. It was repaired according to the previous design, under the direction of the engineer Giovanni Baldini.

The hut's location in the river wetlands leaves it exposed to damage from natural elements. In 1975, after concern that the land was subsiding, the Capanno Garibaldi was raised by 125 centimetres (49 in). In 1981, the municipal government installed a stone embankment to protect the hut from waterside erosion. The driveway leading to the hut was raised by 65 centimetres (26 in) in 1998.

In 2023, the hut was listed by the regional government of Emilia-Romagna as part of the Case e studi delle persone illustri initiative, which recognises sites associated with the region's historical figures.

== Architecture and layout ==
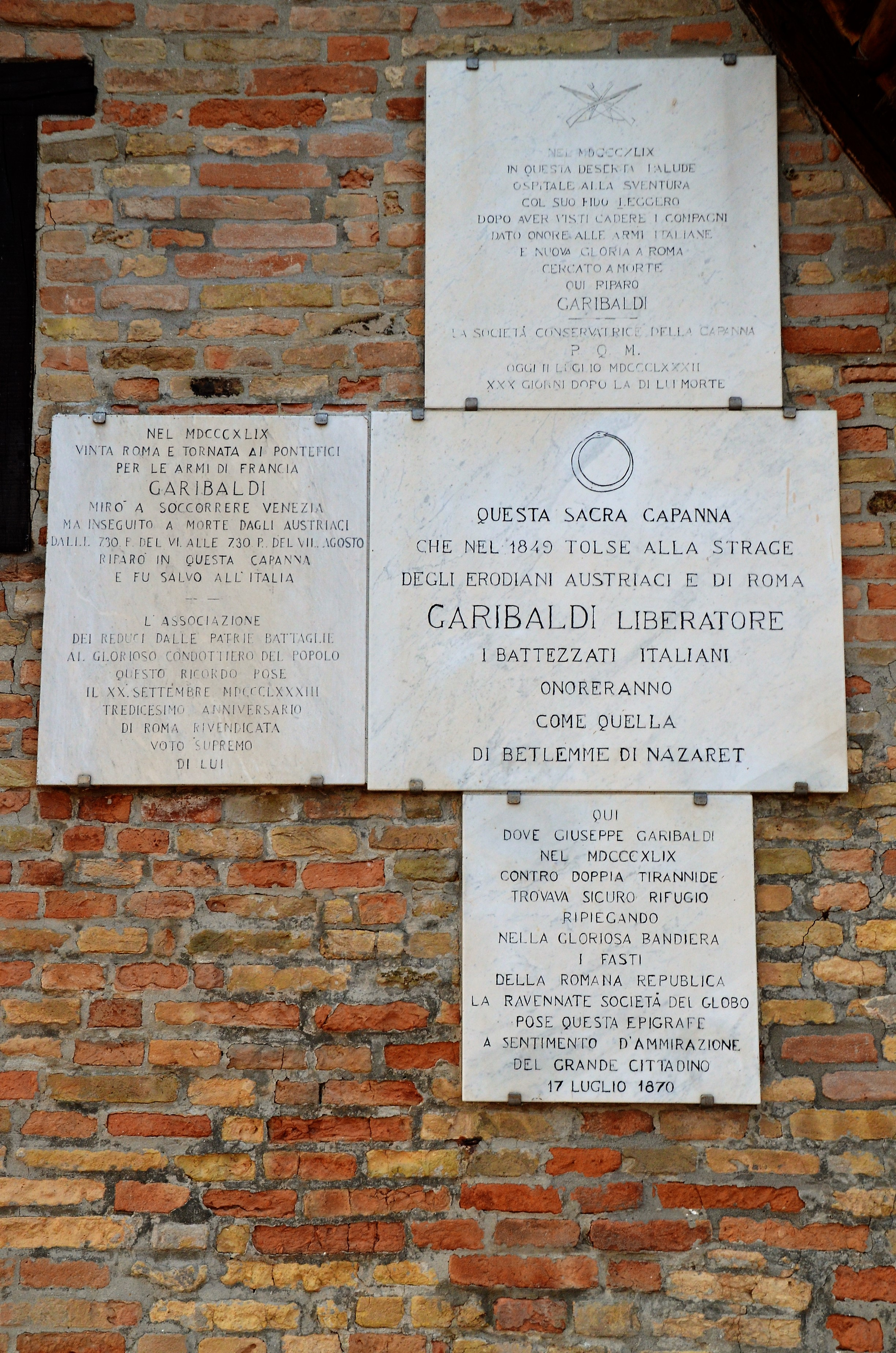
Plaques on the Capanno Garibaldi's wall, August 2017

The hut's walls are made of stone, while its sloping roof is covered with reeds. Being susceptible to water infiltration, it requires regular reroofing, as occurred in 2007 (in collaboration with the Museo delle Civiltà Palustri of Villanova di Bagnacavallo) and 2021. Four memorial plaques commemorating the hut's history are affixed to the hut's façade. One of the inscriptions reads:

This sacred shack, that in 1849 saved Garibaldi the Liberator from the massacre of the Austrian Herodians and of Rome, the baptised Italians honour as that of Bethlehem of Nazareth.

The ground floor contains two rectangular rooms. The larger chamber, which measures 5.85 metres (19.2 ft) by 3.85 metres (12.6 ft), contains a fireplace and a wooden staircase leading to a wooden attic. The smaller room, which measures 4.15 metres (13.6 ft) by 2.65 metres (8.7 ft), was likely used to store hunting equipment.

The hut is accessed by a dirt road, with a concrete bridge connecting it to the via Baiona aqueduct. The concrete bridge dates to the 1970s, and replaced an earlier wooden bridge. In 1999, the bridge was raised to protect it from high tides.

Since the 1970s, several pines, olive trees, and tamarisks have been planted in the surrounding land to enhance the hut's aesthetic appearance and protect it from the wind and summer sun.

== In popular culture ==
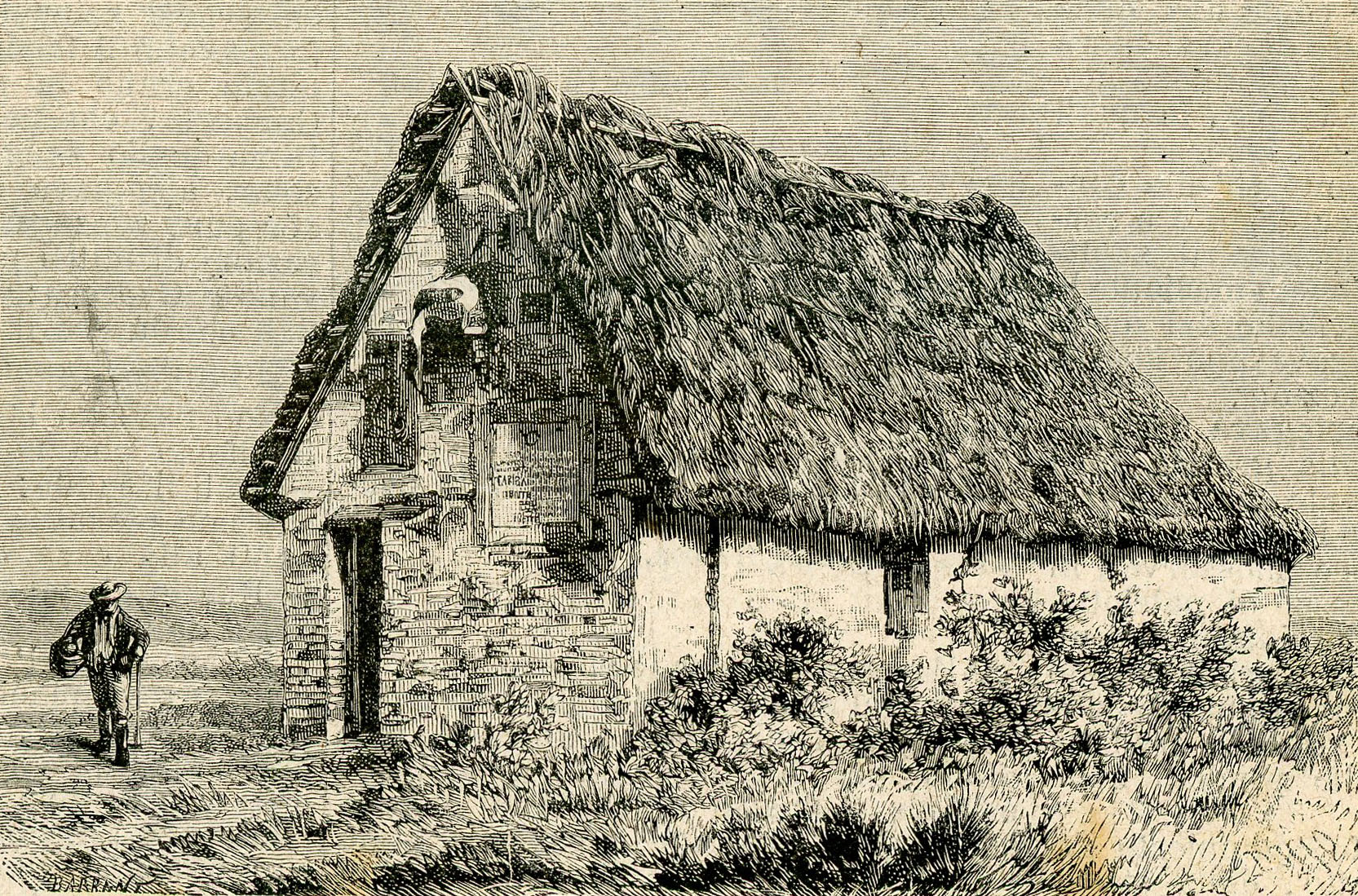
Charles Barbant's 1884 illustration of the Capanno Garibaldi in L'Illustrazione Popolare

As of April 2024, the Capanno Garibaldi is open to visitors with free entry between mid-March and November. It features on regional tourist itineraries, especially those of Garibaldi's life.

The hut hosts local historical celebrations for Garibaldi and the Risorgimento, including the Festa della Repubblica on 2 June, the date of Garibaldi's death. Since 2010, the Capanno Garibaldi has hosted a toast to Garibaldi each New Year's Eve, completed with panettone and mulled wine. The event begins with a torchlight procession from the bridge leading to the hut.

The hut was included in Charles Yriarte's travel guide De Ravenna à Otrante (1877). Artists who have painted, illustrated, or engraved the Capanno Garibaldi include Norberto Pazzini, Vittorio Guaccimanni, and Orazio Toschi.

Garibaldi's stay at the hut is mentioned in Luigi Orsini's 1921 poem La morte di Anita:

That Brave One erred, broken by the elements
within the Forest that holds so much
mystery of leaves and strange enchantments.
Short was the stay which protected the rugged
Capanno, good for hosting that Great One,
between the lonely and bare walls.

— Luigi Orsini, La morte di Anita (1921)

The Capanno Garibaldi was among the first monuments to be modelled for Italia in Miniatura, a miniature park in Viserba founded in 1968 by a plumber from Ravenna.

== Gallery ==
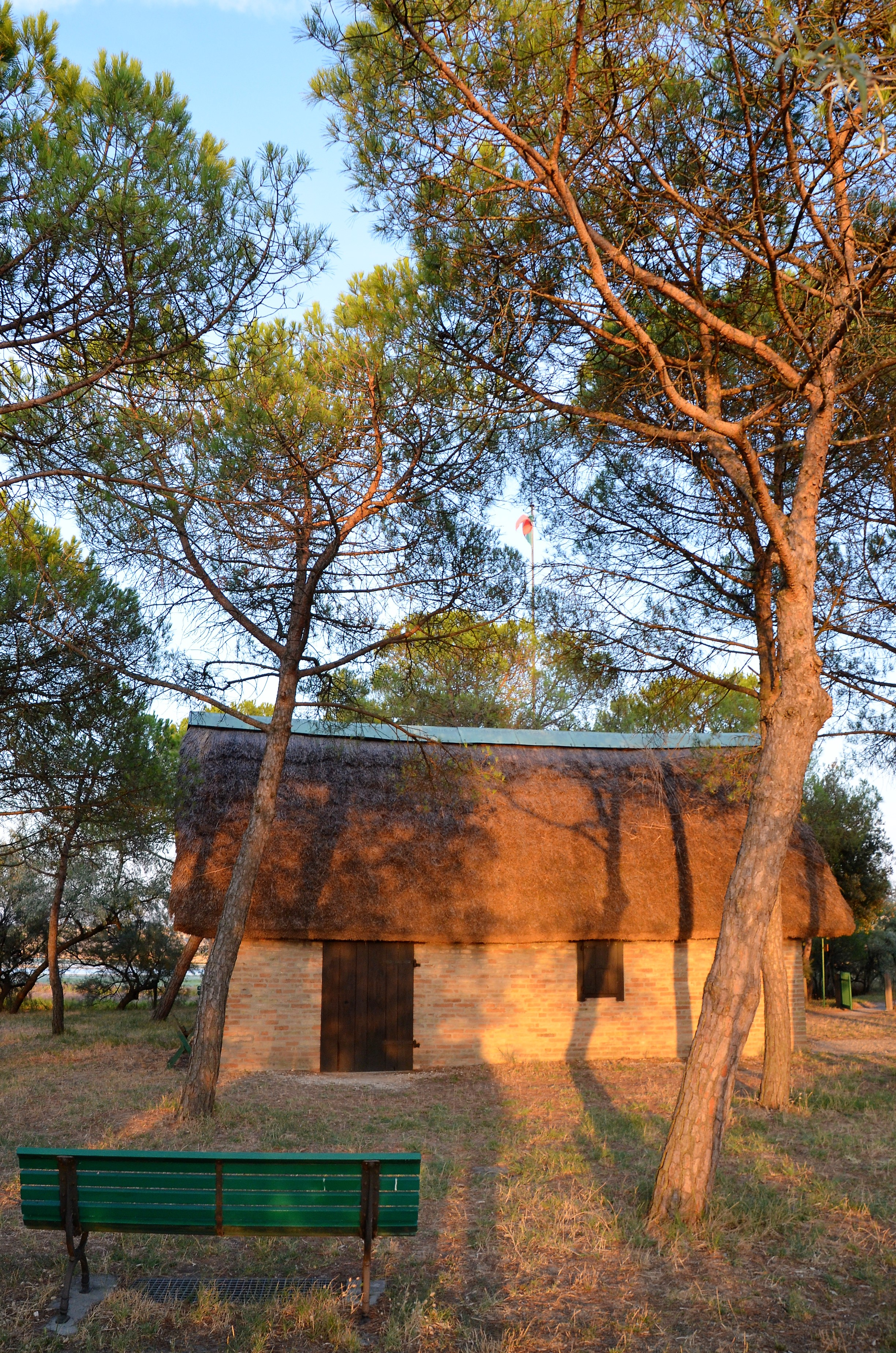
Profile view of the Capanno Garibaldi, August 2017

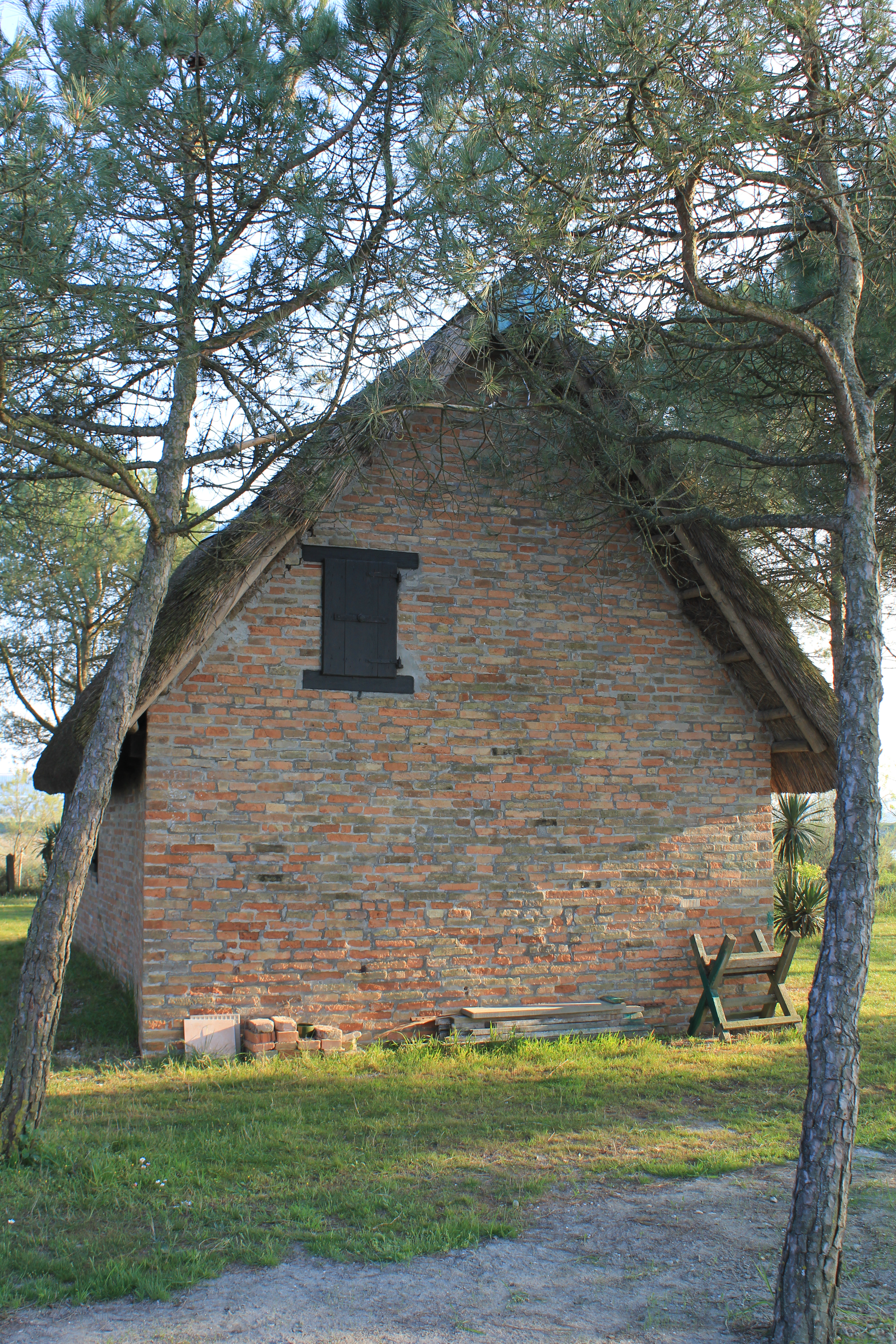
The back wall of the Capanno Garibaldi, April 2016

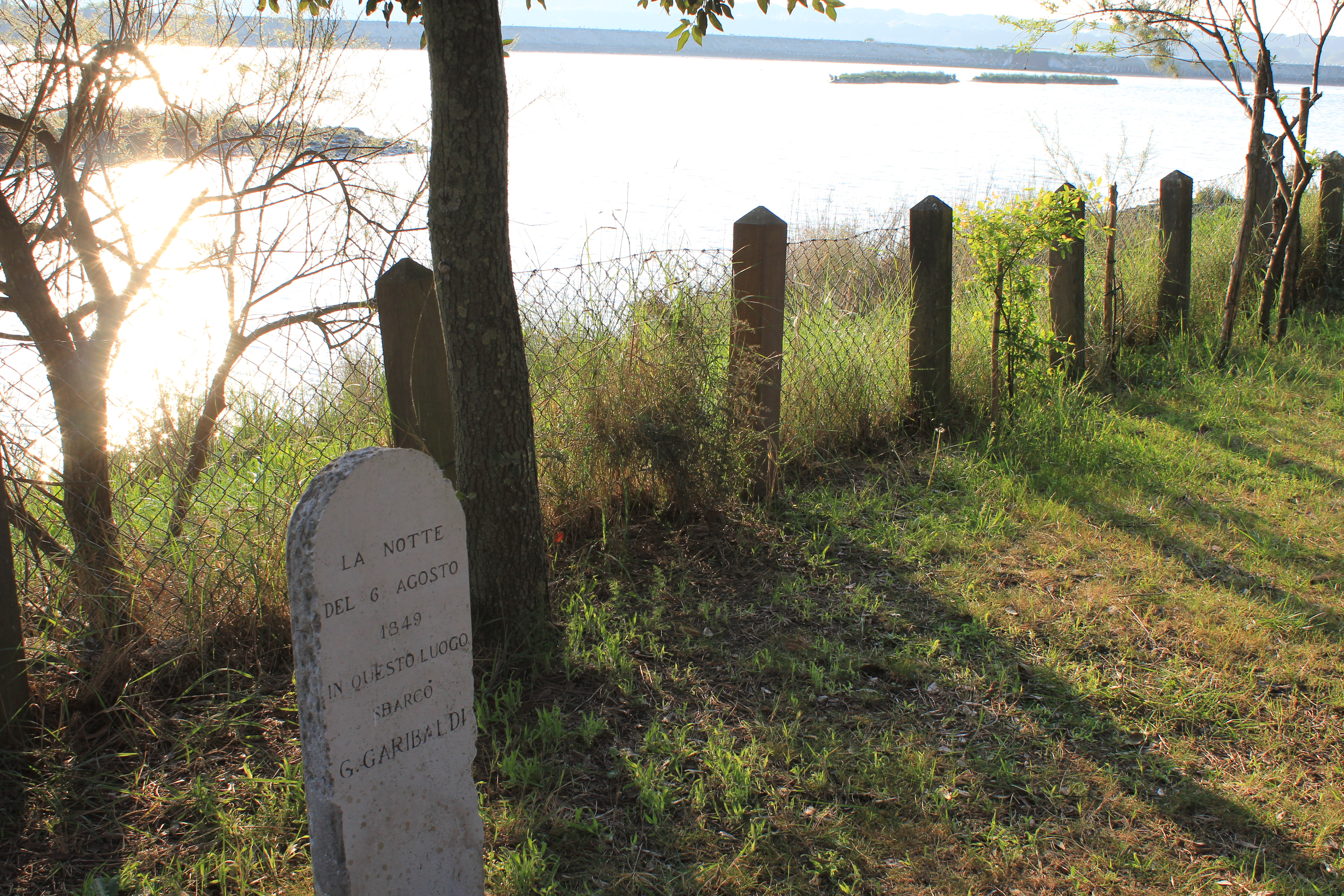
A memorial stone commemorating Garibaldi's stay, September 2016
