= Giuseppe Ricci =

Italian painter (1853–1901)

Giuseppe Ricci (1853 – April 21, 1901) was an Italian painter, primarily of indoor genre themes.

== Biography ==
While he was born and resided in Genoa, he trained first in Turin with Enrico Gamba and then in Paris with Léon Bonnat. In 1880, he exhibited Bozzeto di mendicante. In 1892, the Civic Museum of Turin acquired Una lezione di musica (The Music Lesson). In 1900, he painted Voci Intime (Intimate Voices); Madonna del Fiore (won Alinari Prize); and Le pain be'nit (1900). He was strongly influenced by the French painter Eugène Carrière. Giuseppe Pasquale Ricci, who bears no known relationship, was a merchant of the city of Trieste.

In 1880 at the Exhibition of Turin, Ricci displayed Buon viaggio; and in 1884, Diogene and In processione. In 1883 at the Exhibition of Rome, he exhibited Per la processione. In 1880, at the Fine Arts Exhibition of Milan, he displayed the realist style painting of Mendicante (Beggar). Ricci died in Turin in 1901.
