= Aquarium of Cattolica =

Coordinates: 43.97°N 12.72°E

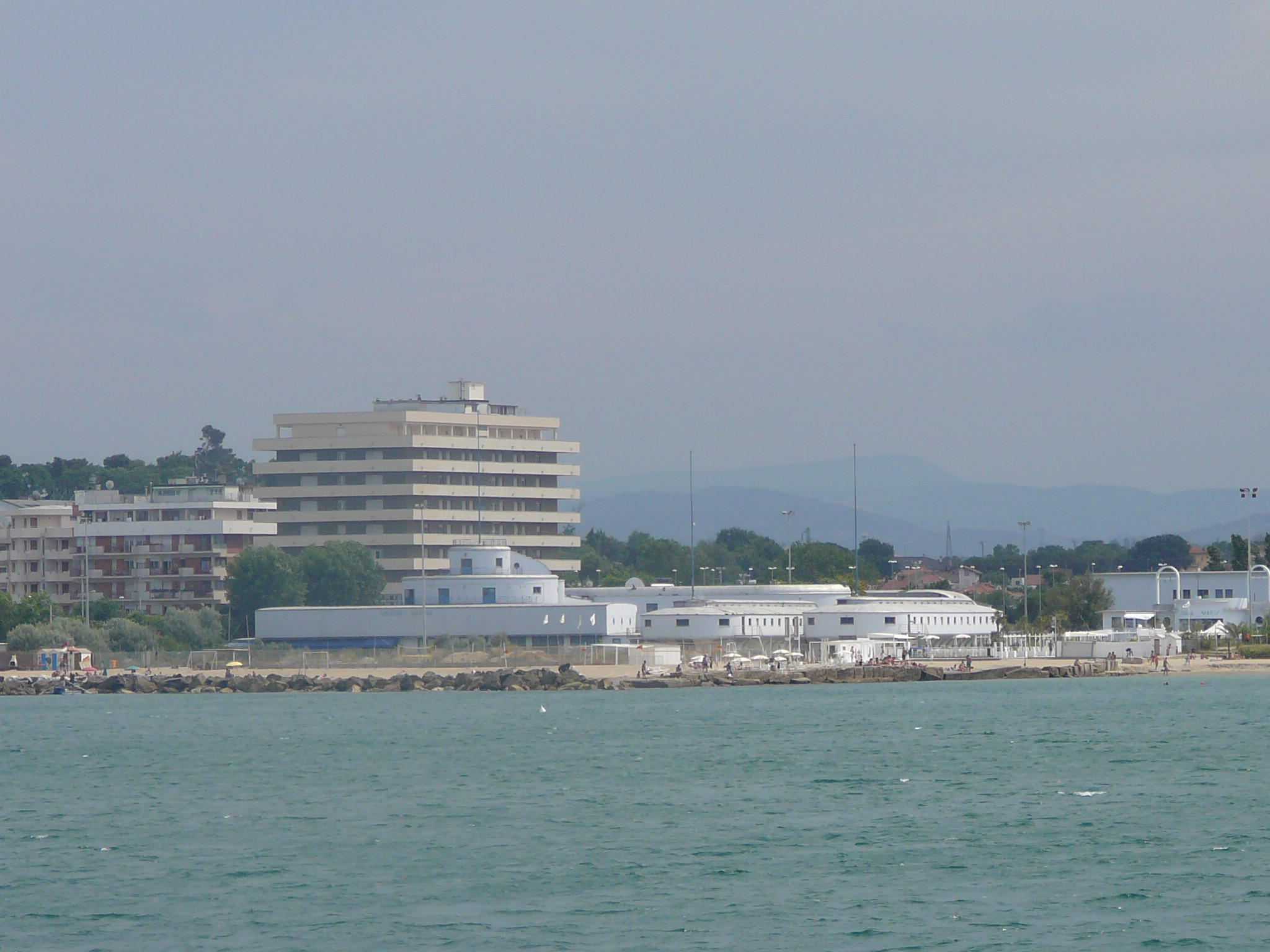
- The Aquarium as seen from the sea
- Interactive map of Aquarium of Cattolica
- Date opened: 2000
- Location: Cattolica, Italy
- No. of animals: 3000+
- No. of species: 400
- Volume of largest tank: 700,000 L (180,000 US gal)
- Total volume of tanks: 2,500,000 L (660,000 US gal)
- Website: www.acquariodicattolica.it

The Aquarium of Cattolica is the second largest public aquarium in Italy. It is located in Cattolica on the Adriatic coast. It was inaugurated in 2000.

== Key features ==
The aquarium has a summer camp for the children of Italians who formerly lived abroad. The renovations ended in June 2000, under the aegis of the Soprintendenza per i Beni Ambientali e Architettonici, which were intended to improve the aquarium's ties to history and sea traditions. The Aquarium is on an area of 110 thousand square metres, towards the sea, integrated in the urban texture of Cattolica. In the big garden (more than 49.000 square metres) one can find recreational areas, including restaurant, bar, shops, children entertainment, exhibitions, cultural and sport events.
