= Sergio Romagnoli =

Italian politician

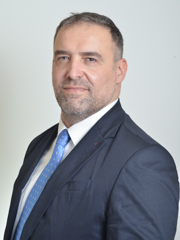

Senator of the Legislature XVIII of Italy
- Incumbent
- Assumed office March 2018
- Constituency: Marche

Personal details
- Born: August 16, 1969 (age 56) Fabriano
- Party: Five Star Movement

Sergio Romagnoli (b. Fabriano, on August 16, 1969) is an Italian politician. He is a member of the XVIII legislature of Italy.

== Biography ==
=== Election as Senator ===
In the 2018 general elections of Italy, he was elected to the Senate of the Republic. He was nominated and elected on the platform of the Five Star Movement in the Marche district.
