= Giuseppe Pasquale Ricci =

Italian merchant

Giuseppe Pasquale Ricci (died 1791) was a leading figure in late-18th-century Trieste, at the time a free port within the Habsburg Empire.

Ricci came from a merchant family from Livorno, and probably came to Trieste initially as a merchant, in the early 1750s. He married Marianna Grossel, daughter of a merchant from Ljubljana, in 1754. He quickly developed a network of contacts and forsook business for a career as a government official.

By 1761, Ricci was Commerce Councilor of the Intendancy (Trieste's de facto government), in which capacity he recommended in a report to Vienna that Greeks and Jews should be invited to the city to develop its commerce, on the strength of those groups' reputations as merchants. In 1763 he proposed a commission to study manufacturing and factories on the Habsburg littoral; he was appointed head of the commission, serving from 1763 to 1776. He held a number of other posts in the Trieste administration as well, among them: government delegate to the non-Uniate Greek community, president of the tribunal of the mercantile exchange, president of the police commission, provisional health magistrate, and interim governor.

He was ennobled in 1776, and made patrician by the Trieste city council in 1779. He died in Trieste in 1791.
