= Madonna della Scala, Rimini =

Church building in Rimini, Italy

Coordinates: 44.0664°N 12.5678°E

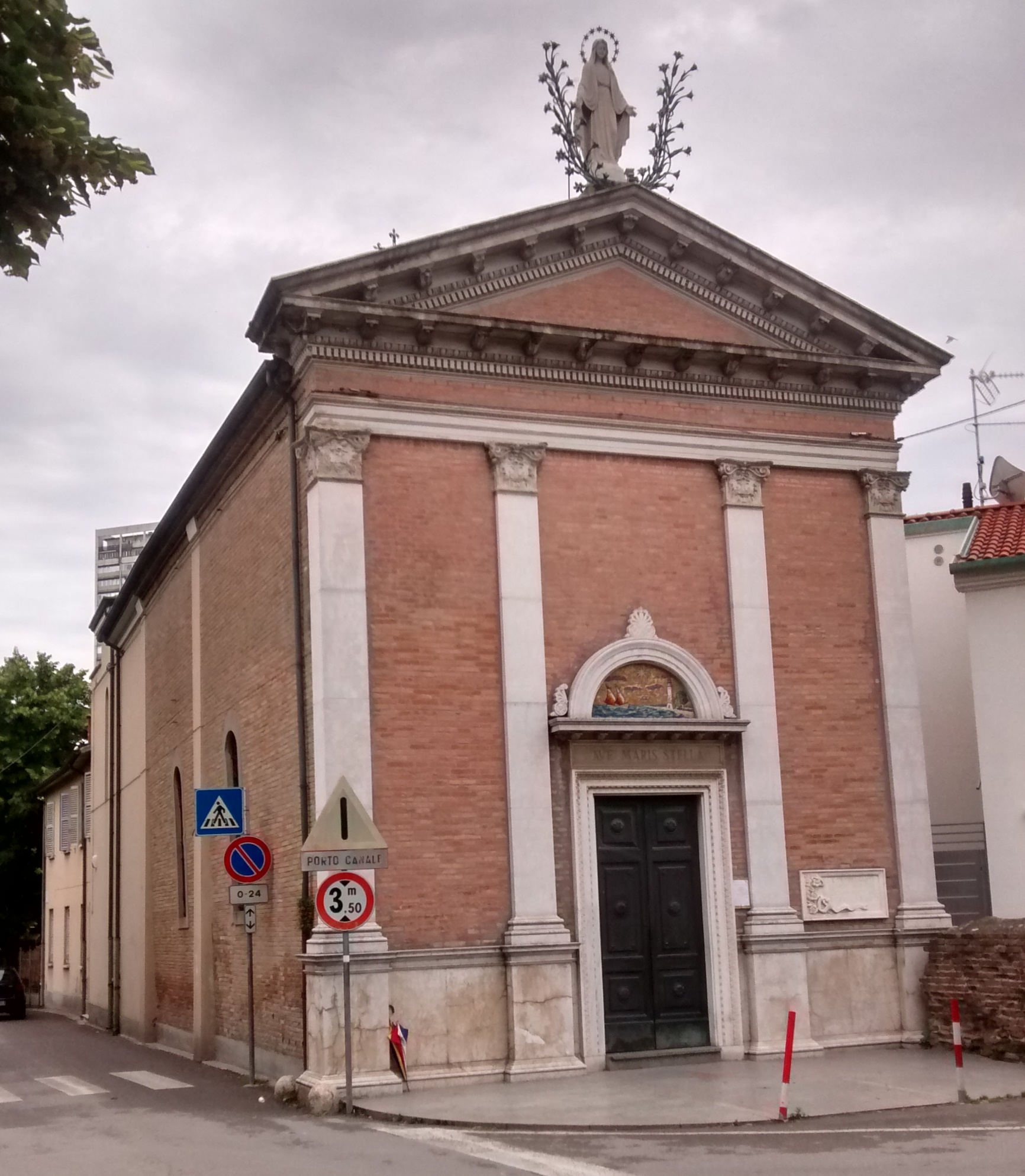
Facade

The Madonna della Scala is a Baroque-style Roman Catholic church in via Madonna della Scala #2 in the neighborhood of San Giuliano in the city of Rimini, Italy.

== History ==
The church was built in 1611, near the former Porta Gervasona in the medieval walls of the city. The church was built near the site of a miracle. In 1608, a young man and his horse fell into the river Marecchia near a tower at the site, with stairs (Scala) leading to the bank. He prayed for help from an icon of the virgin that had been painted on the tower. His rescue led to veneration of the icon by sailors. The icon, painted by the local painter Alessandro Codrini in 1608, became a source of veneration for sailors; it has been restored over the centuries. The church was refurbished in 1717.
