= Marco Battagli =

Italian historian and chronicler

Marco Battagli or Marcus de Battaglis (died 1370/76) was a historian from Rimini in North Eastern Italy. He wrote a universal chronicle in Latin. He is one of the very few people who survived after contracting pneumonic plague.
