= Emilia-Romagna =

Region of Italy

Coordinates: 44°30′38″N 10°57′25″E

Emilia-Romagna Emégglia-Rumâgna / Emîlia-Rumâgna (Emilian) Emélia-Rumâgna (Romagnol)
- Region
- Flag Coat of arms

- Country: Italy
- Capital: Bologna

Government
  - Type: Presidential system
  - President: Michele De Pascale (PD)
  - Vice President: Vincenzo Colla

Area
  - Total: 22,509.67 km^{2} (8,691.03 sq mi)

Population (2026)
  - Total: 4,477,009
  - Density: 198.8927/km^{2} (515.1297/sq mi)
- Demonyms: English: Emilian-Romagnol; Emilian: emigliàn (man), emiglièna (woman); Romagnol: rumagnòl (man), rumagnòla (woman); Italian: emiliano and romagnolo (man), emiliana (woman) and romagnola (woman)

GDP
  - Total: €198.395 billion (2024)
  - Per capita: €44,473 (2024)
- Time zone: UTC+1 (CET)
  - Summer (DST): UTC+2 (CEST)
- ISO 3166 code: IT-45
- NUTS Region: ITH
- HDI (2021): 0.935 very high · 1st of 21
- Website: www.regione.emilia-romagna.it/en/

Emilia-Romagna (UK: /ɪˌmiːliə roʊˈmɑːnjə/, US: /eɪˌ-/, both also /ɛˌ-/, Italian: [eˈmiːlja roˈmaɲɲa]) is an administrative region of northern Italy, comprising the historical regions of Emilia and Romagna. Its capital is Bologna. It has a population of over 4.4 million in an area of 22,509.67 km^{2} (8,691 sq mi).

Emilia-Romagna is one of the wealthiest and most developed regions in Europe, with the third highest gross domestic product per capita in Italy. It is also a cultural centre, being the home of the University of Bologna, the oldest university in the world. Some of its cities, such as Modena, Ferrara, and Ravenna, are UNESCO World Heritage Sites. It is a centre for food and automobile production (such as Ferrari, Lamborghini, and Maserati). It has coastal resorts such as Cervia, Cesenatico, and Rimini. In 2018, the Lonely Planet guide named Emilia-Romagna as the best place to see in Europe.

== Etymology ==
The name Emilia-Romagna dates back to Ancient Rome. Emilia derives from the via Aemilia, the Roman road connecting Piacenza to Rimini, completed in 187 BC, and named after the consul Marcus Aemilius Lepidus. Romagna derives from Romània, the name of the Eastern Roman Empire applied to Ravenna by the Lombards when the western Empire had ceased to exist and Ravenna was an outpost of the east (540–751).

== History ==
=== Prehistory and antiquity ===
Before the Romans took control of present-day Emilia-Romagna, it was part of the Etruscan world and later the Gauls. During the first thousand years of Christianity, trade flourished, as did culture and religion, thanks to the region's numerous monasteries.

=== Early origins ===
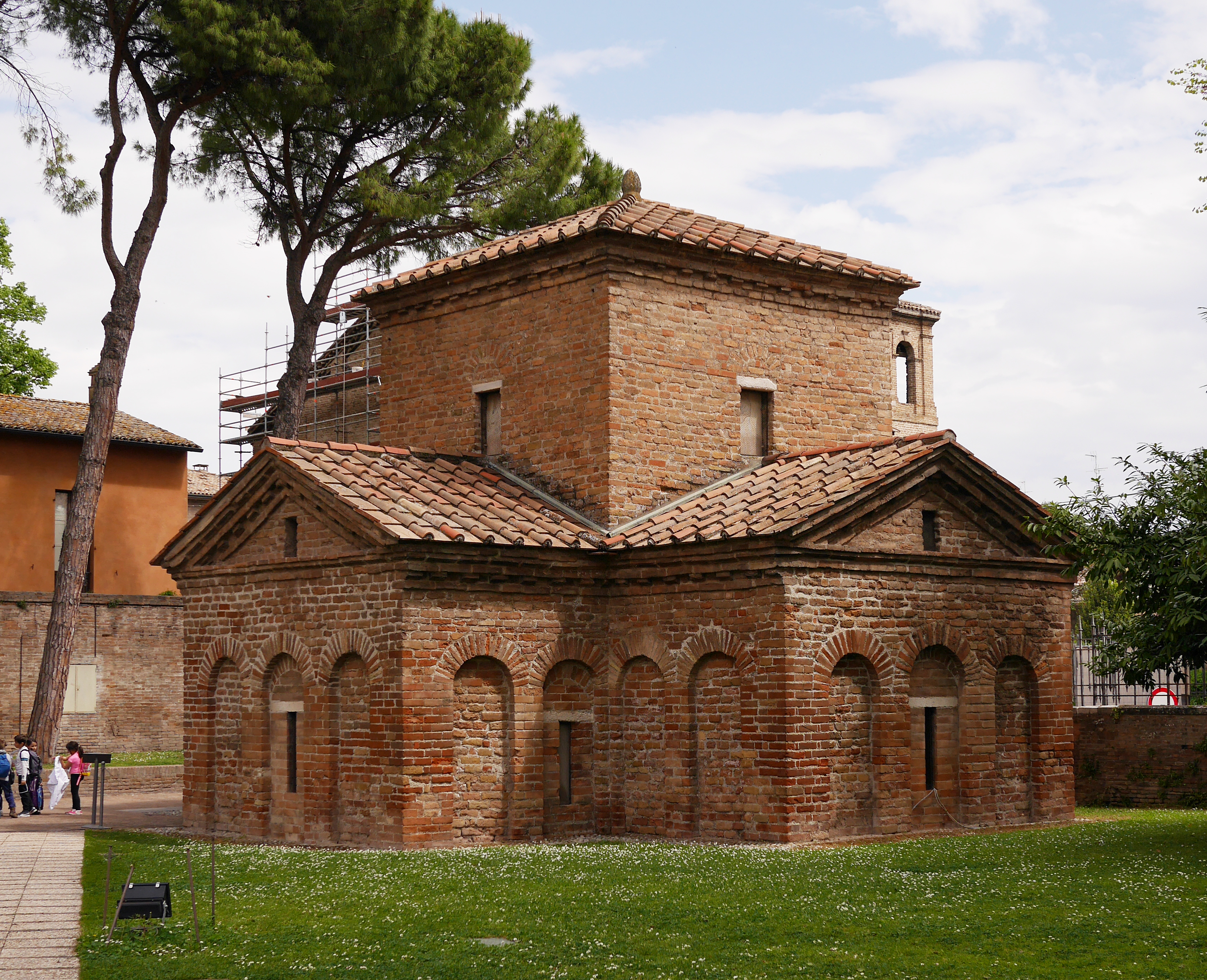
Mausoleum of Galla Placidia, early Christian Monuments of Ravenna

The history of Emilia-Romagna dates back to Roman times, when imperial judges linked to the nearby regions of either Liguria or Tuscany ruled the region of Emilia. After the fall of the Western Roman Empire in the 5th century, the Lombards, a Germanic tribe, founded the kingdom of Lombardy in northern and central Italy. This kingdom, which included the region known as Emilia, flourished until the Lombard dynasty was overthrown by the Frankish king Charlemagne in 774. From the 6th to 8th centuries, the region of Romagna was under Byzantine rule, and Ravenna was the capital of the Exarchate of Italy within the Eastern Roman Empire. In the 8th century, this region became a province of the Papal States when Pepin, Charlemagne's father, donated the land to the Pope in 754.

=== High Middle Ages to early modern period ===
In the 10th century, northern Italy became part of the Holy Roman Empire under the Germanic leader Otto I. Holy Roman emperors held varying degrees of control over northern Italy until the end of the Middle Ages. In the 12th century, the papacy extended its political influence, and city-states began to form in opposition to the Holy Roman emperors.

The northern cities, supported by the Pope, formed the Lombard League and reduced the Hohenstaufen dynasty's influence over their lands. Division between imperial partisans and their opponents created factions called the Guelphs and the Ghibellines, which would divide the cities for centuries. For the next few centuries, papal legates, or representatives of the Pope, ruled both Emilia and Romagna.

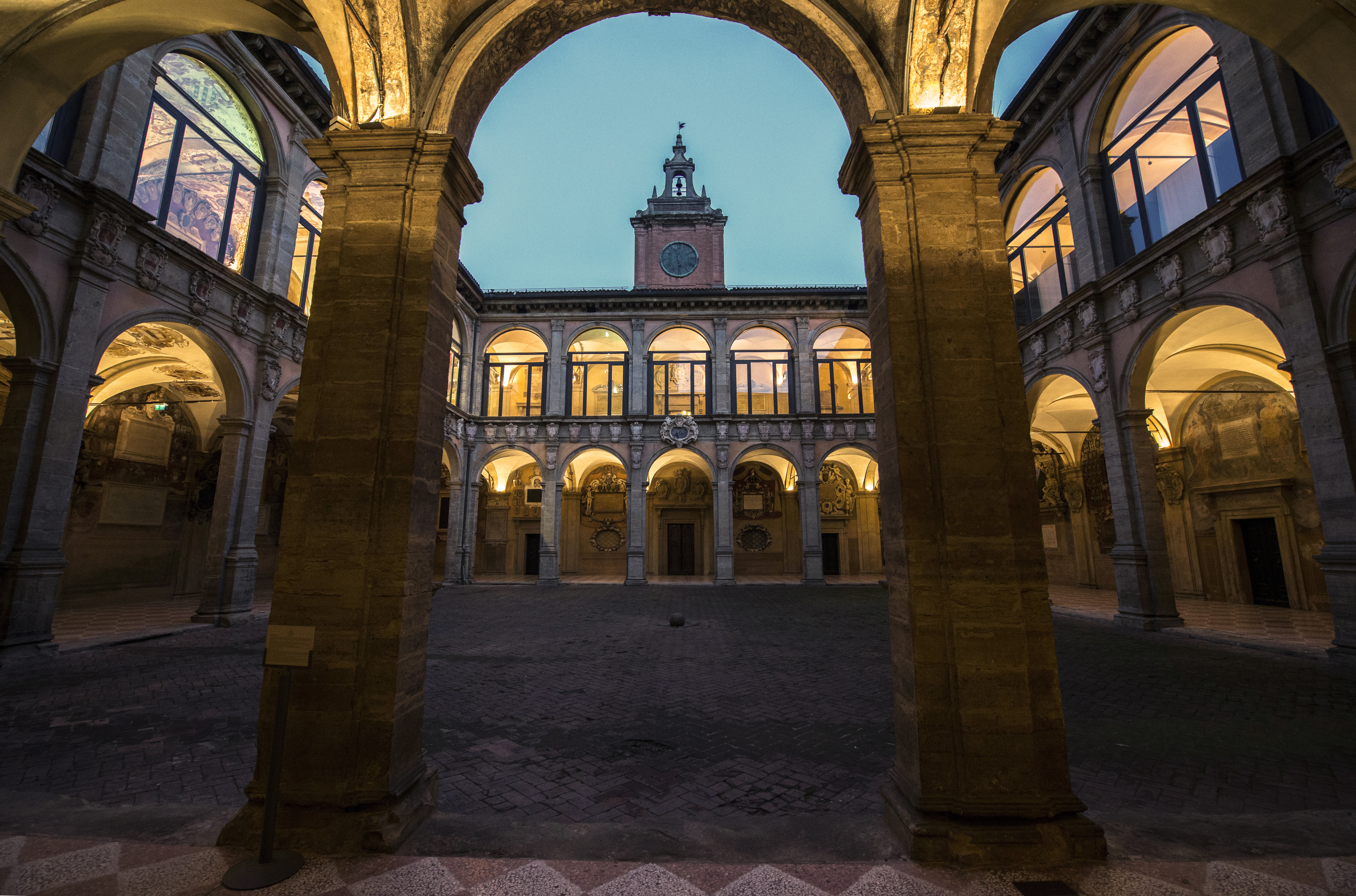
The University of Bologna, founded in 1088, is the world's oldest university in continuous operation.

The University of Bologna—the world's oldest university, established in AD 1088—and its bustling towns kept trade and intellectual life alive. Local nobility like the Este of Ferrara, the Malatesta of Rimini, the Popes of Rome, the Farnese of Parma and Piacenza, and the Duchy of Modena and Reggio, jostled for power and influence.

Castle Estense in Ferrara

The House of Este gained a notable profile for its political and military might and its patronage of the arts: it left behind a vast heritage of splendid Renaissance palaces, precious paintings and literary masterpieces, such as the works of Ludovico Ariosto, Torquato Tasso and Matteo Maria Boiardo.

Flag of the Cispadane Republic, which was the first Italian tricolour adopted by a sovereign Italian state (1797)

Following the rise of Napoleon, the region of Emilia came under French control. The first red, white and green national flag of a sovereign Italian state was adopted on 7 January 1797, when the Fourteenth Parliament of the Cispadane Republic (1797), on the proposal of deputy Giuseppe Compagnoni, decreed "to make universal the ... standard or flag of three colours, green, white, and red ...": For having proposed the green, white and red tricolour flag, Giuseppe Compagnoni is considered the "father of the Italian flag".

After the Congress of Vienna in 1815, a growing movement for Italian national unity and independence emerged. In 1848, a revolution in Vienna initiated uprisings against Austrian rule. Over the following decades, uprisings spread to several regions, and in 1861 the Kingdom of Italy was established. During this Italian Unification, the territories of Emilia and Romagna were incorporated into the new nation.

=== Late modern and contemporary ===
In the 16th century, the Papal States seized most of what would become Emilia-Romagna, but the territories of Parma, Piacenza, and Modena remained independent until Emilia-Romagna became part of the Italian kingdom between 1859 and 1861.

After the First World War, Emilia-Romagna was at the center of the so-called Biennio Rosso, a period of left-wing agitations that paved the way for Benito Mussolini's coup d'état in 1922 and the birth of the Fascist regime in Italy. Mussolini, a native of Emilia-Romagna, sponsored the rise of many hierarchs from his region, such as Italo Balbo, Dino Grandi, and Edmondo Rossoni.

Towards the end of the Second World War, Emilia-Romagna was occupied by Germany and was the theatre of numerous Nazi war crimes, such as the Marzabotto massacre in which 770 innocent civilians were brutally executed by German troops.

During the Cold war era, Bologna, traditionally a left-wing city, was particularly hit by political street violence and terrorism; in 1980 a far-right terrorist group detonated a bomb at the city's main railway station, killing 85 people and wounding more than 200.

After the referendum of 2006, seven municipalities of Montefeltro were detached from the Province of Pesaro and Urbino (Marche) to join that of Rimini on 15 August 2009. The municipalities are Casteldelci, Maiolo, Novafeltria, Pennabilli, San Leo, Sant'Agata Feltria and Talamello.

On 20 and 29 May 2012, two powerful earthquakes struck the central area of the region, killing 27 people and causing substantial damage to the region's artistic heritage as well as to numerous manufacturing facilities. The 5.8 magnitude earthquake left 14,000 people temporarily homeless.

== Geography ==
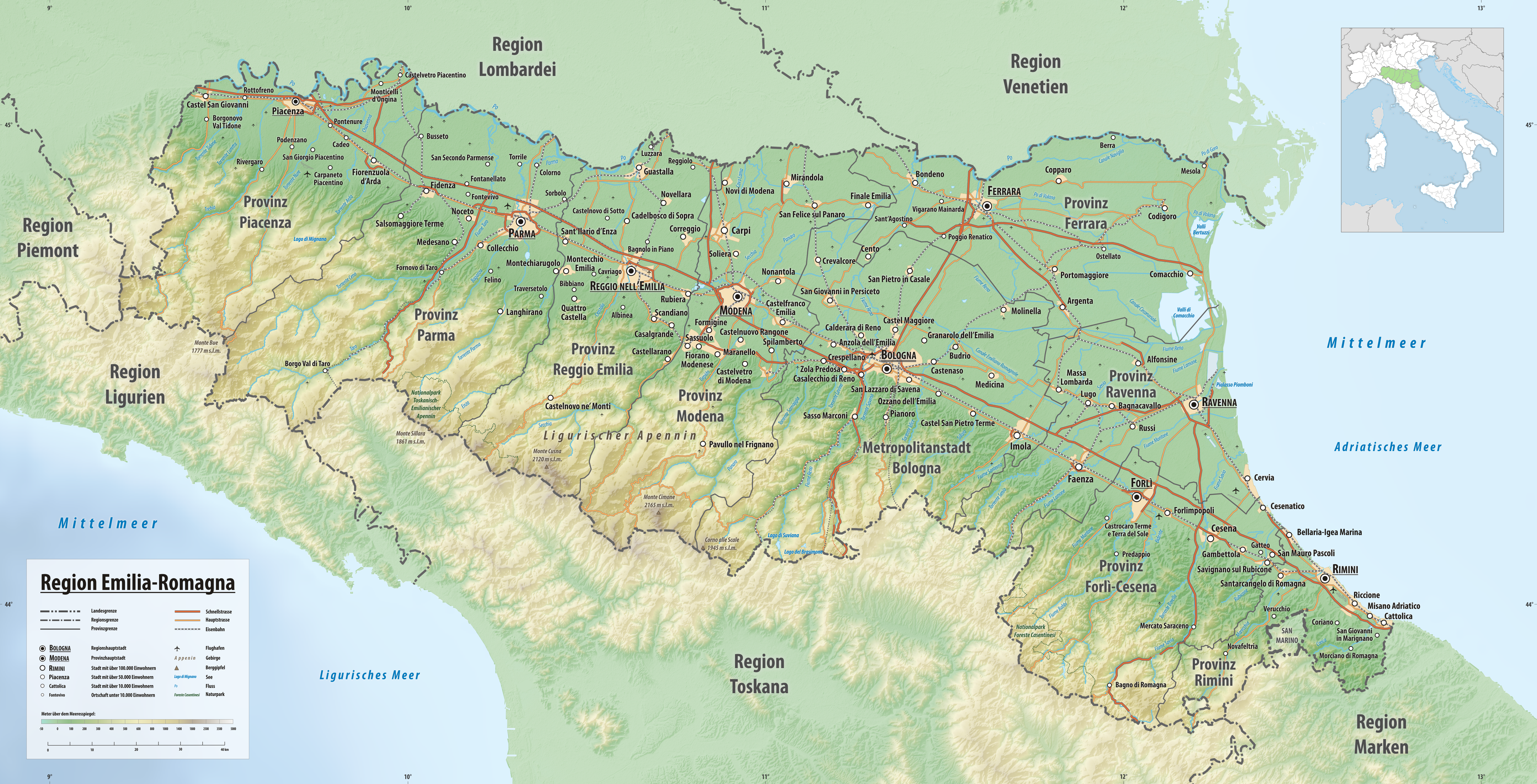
Relief map of Emilia-Romagna

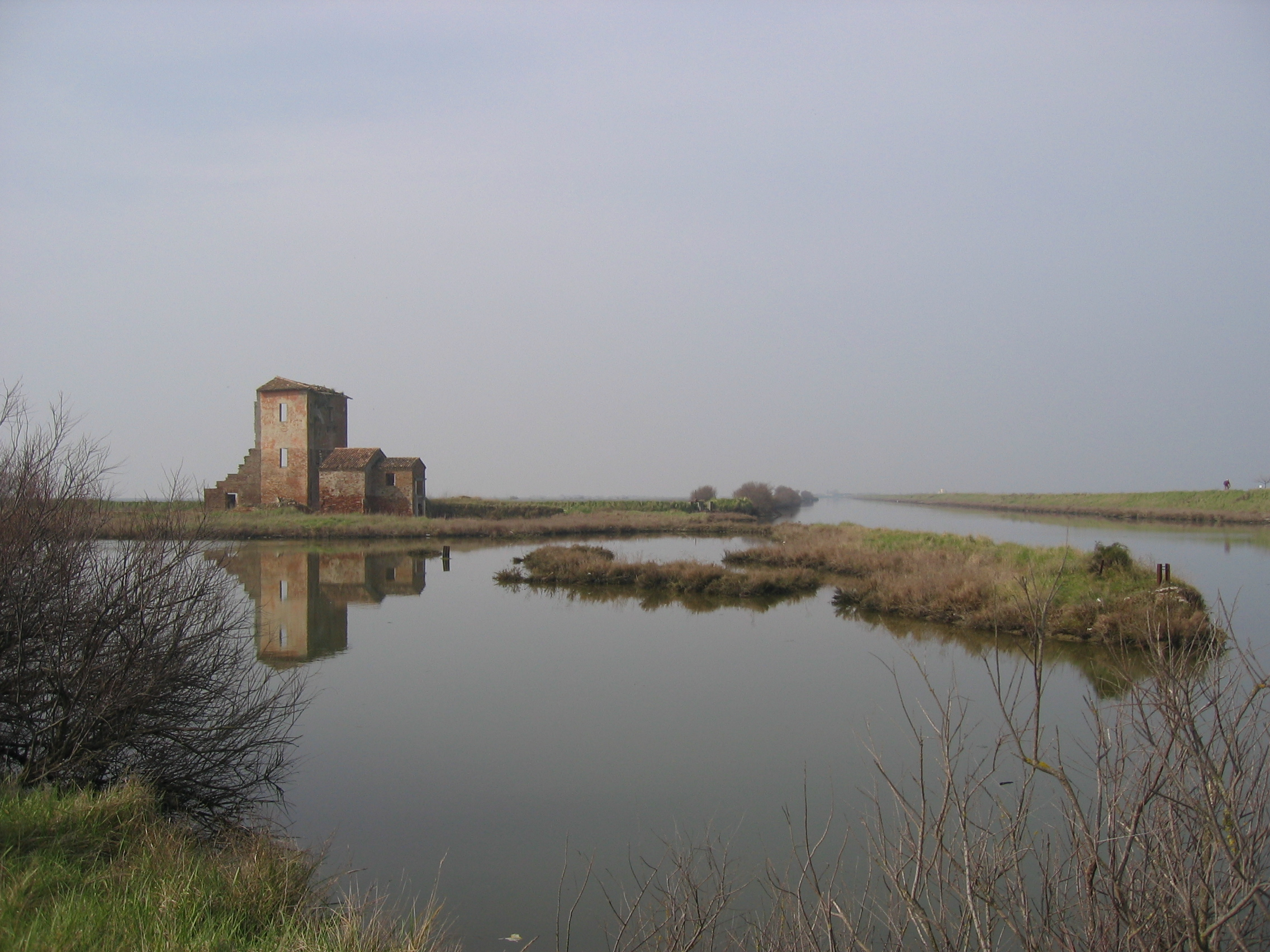
Lagoons along the Po delta

The region of Emilia-Romagna consists of nine provinces and covers an area of 22,446 km^{2} (8,666 sq mi), ranking sixth in Italy. Nearly half of the region (48%) consists of plains while 27% is hilly and 25% mountainous. The region's section of the Apennines is marked by areas of flysch, badland erosion (calanques) and caves. The mountains stretch for more than 300 km (186.41 mi) from the north to the south-east, with only three peaks above 2,000 m – Monte Cimone (2,165 m), Monte Cusna (2,121 m) and Alpe di Succiso (2,017 m).

The plain was formed by the gradual retreat of the sea from the Po basin and by the detritus deposited by the rivers. Almost entirely marshland in ancient times, its history is characterised by the hard work of its people to reclaim and reshape the land in order to achieve a better standard of living.

The geology varies, with lagoons and saline areas in the north and many thermal springs throughout the rest of the region as a result of groundwater rising towards the surface at different periods of history. All the rivers rise locally in the Apennines except for the Po, which has its source in the Alps in Piedmont. The northern border of Emilia-Romagna follows the path of the river for 263 km (163 1/2 mi).

The region has temperate broadleaved and mixed forests and the vegetation may be divided into belts: the Common oak-European hornbeam belt (Padan plain and adriatic coast) which is now covered (apart from the Mesóla forest in Province of Ferrara) with fruit orchards and fields of wheat and sugar beet, the Pubescent oak-European hop-hornbeam belt on the lower slopes up to 800–900 m, the European beech-Silver fir belt between 800–900 m and 1,700 m and the final mountain heath belt above 1,700–1,800 m. Emilia-Romagna has two Italian National Parks, the Foreste Casentinesi National Park and the Appennino Tosco-Emiliano National Park.

=== Land use ===
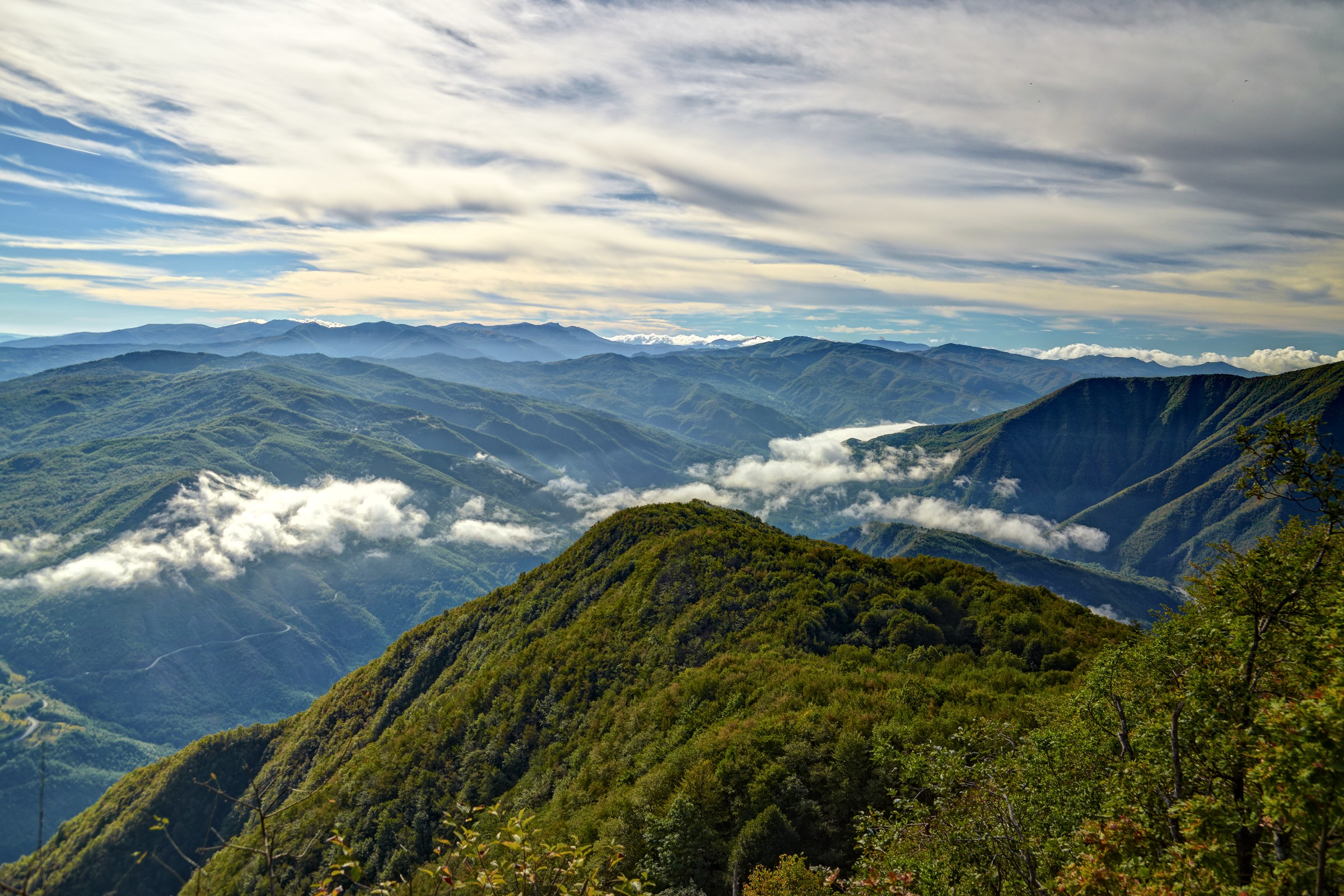
Val Trebbia, near Piacenza

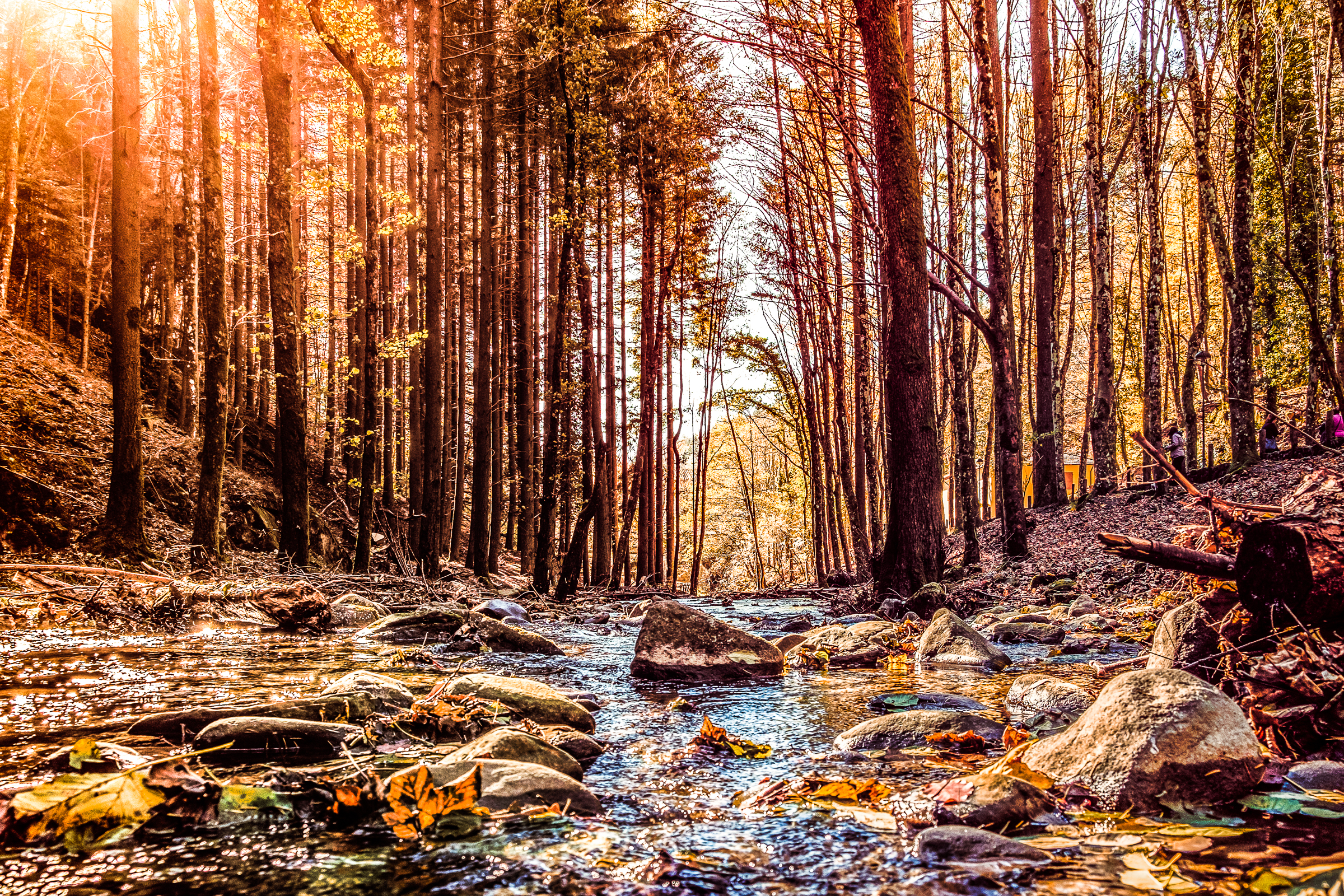
Casentinesi Forests

Emilia-Romagna has been a highly populated area since ancient times. Inhabitants over the centuries have radically altered the landscape, building cities, reclaiming wetlands, and establishing large agricultural areas. All these transformations in past centuries changed the aspect of the region, converting large natural areas to cultivation, up until the 1960s. The trend then changed, and agricultural lands began giving way to residential and industrial areas. The increase of urban-industrial areas continued at very high rates until the end of the 2010s. In the same period, hilly and mountainous areas saw an increase in the registration of semi-natural areas, because of the abandonment of agricultural lands.

Land use changes can have strong effects on ecological functions. Human interactions such as agriculture, forestation and deforestation affect soil function, e.g. food and other biomass production, storing, filtering and transformation, habitat and gene pool.

In the Emilia-Romagna plain, which represents half of the region and where three quarters of the population of the region live, the agricultural land area has been reduced by 157 km^{2} while urban and industrial areas have increased to over 130 km^{2} between 2003 and 2008. The impact of land use, particularly the urbanisation of the Emilia-Romagna plain during this period, has had significant consequences for the economic and ecological assessment. The loss of arable land is equivalent to a permanent loss of the capacity to feed 440,000 persons per year from resources grown within the region. Increased water runoff from soil sealing requires adaptation measures for rivers and irrigation canals, such as building retention basins, at a total cost estimated in the order of billions of euros.

In 2000 there were 103,700 farm holdings and in 2010 there were 73,470, or a -29.2% loss in holdings for the region. The total utilised agricultural area (UAA) was 1,114,590 hectares (2,754,200 acres) in 2000 and 1,064,210 hectares (2,629,700 acres) in 2014 for a loss of 4.5%, indicating a downturn of smaller farm ownership. During this same timeframe there was a 14.5% decrease in the farm labor workforce.

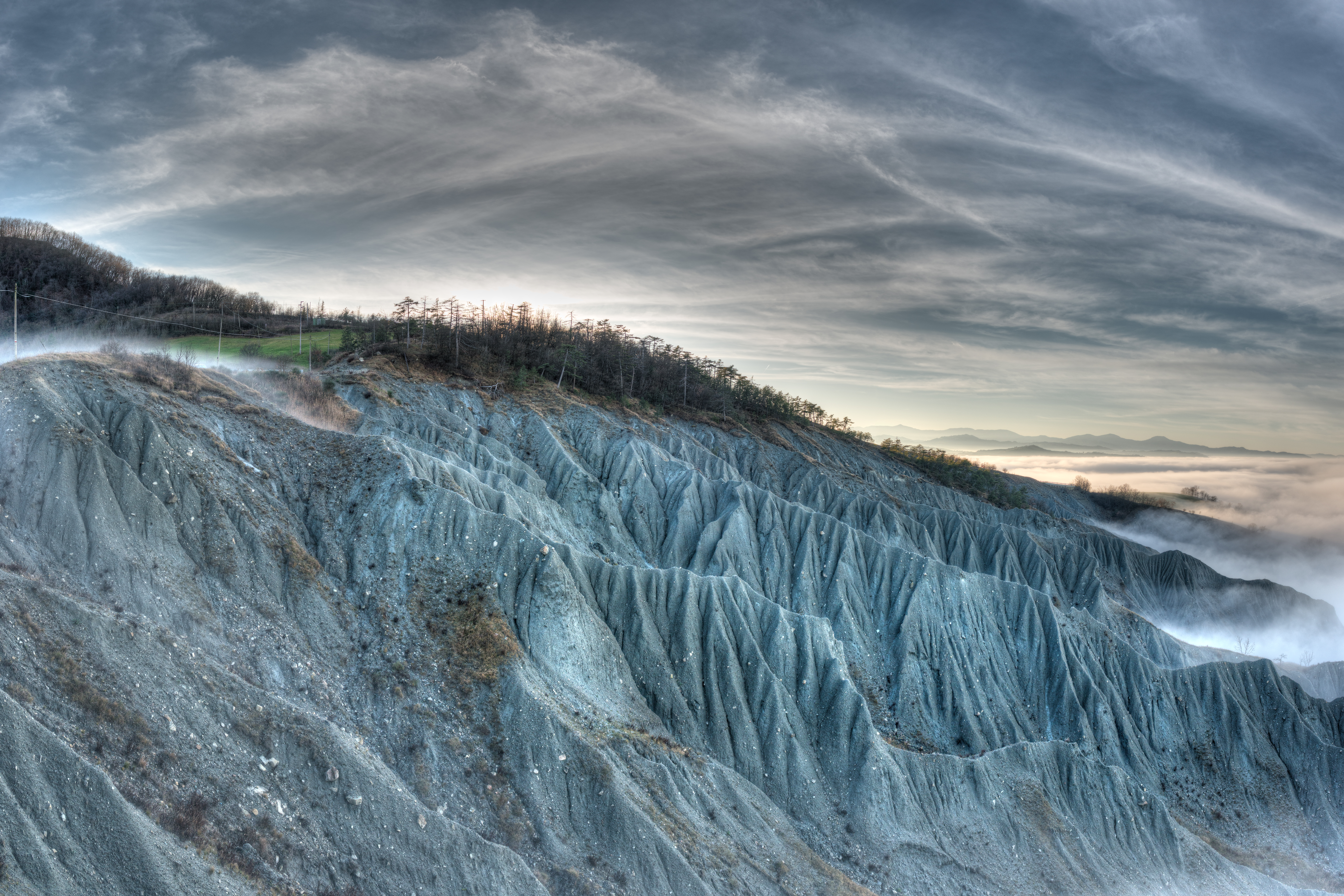
Badlands of Canossa

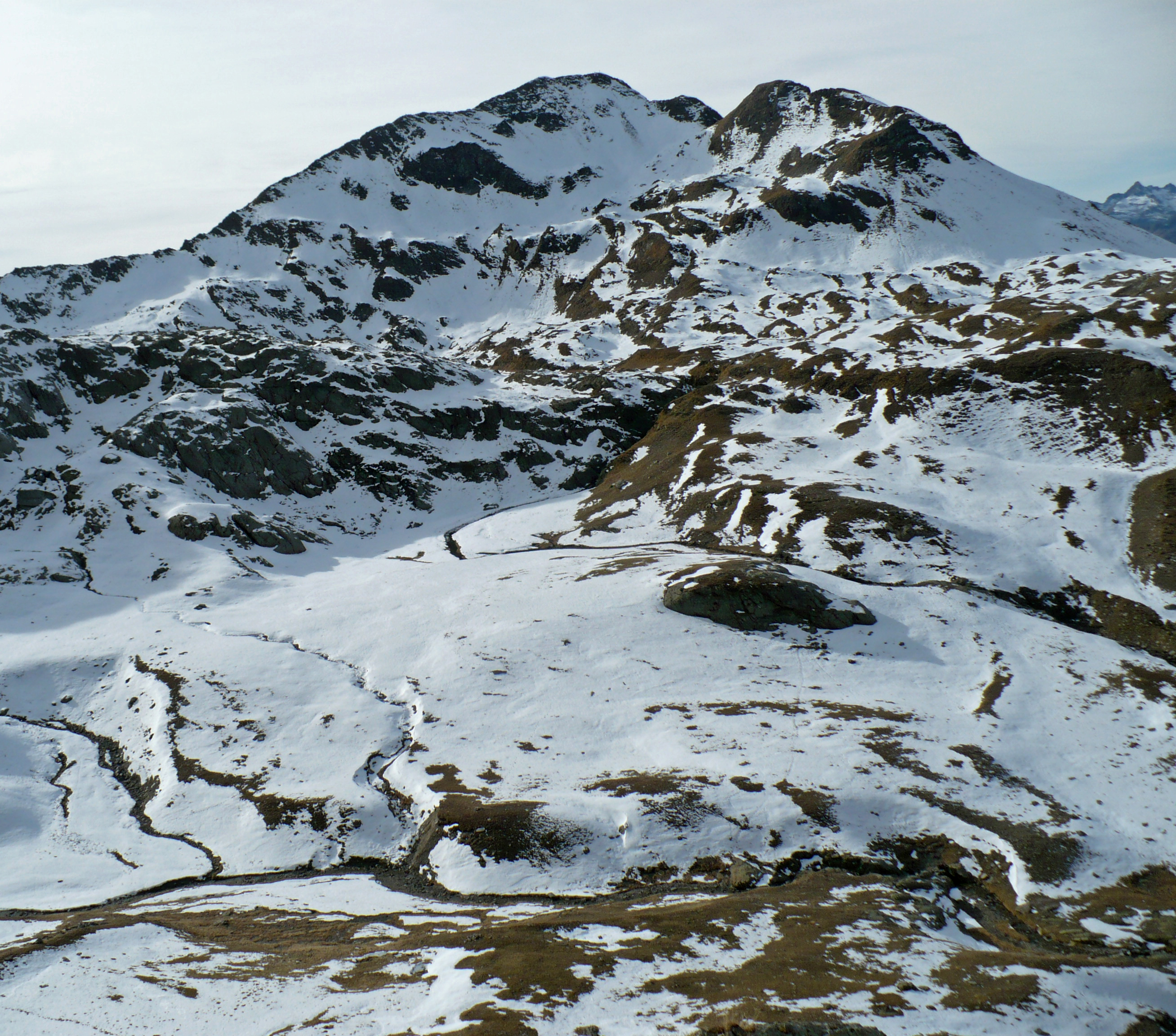
Monte Cimone, in the Apennines

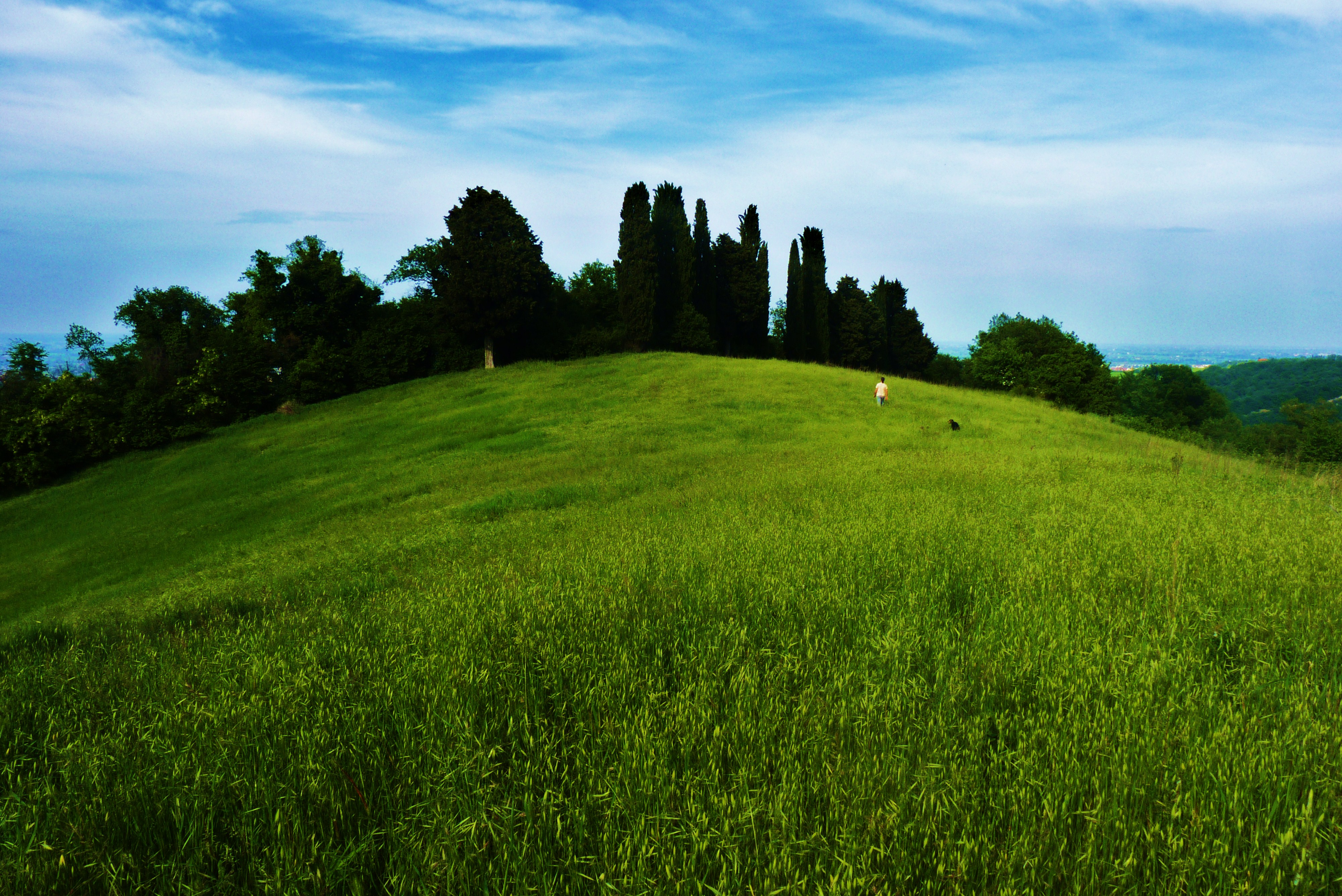
Hills around Bologna

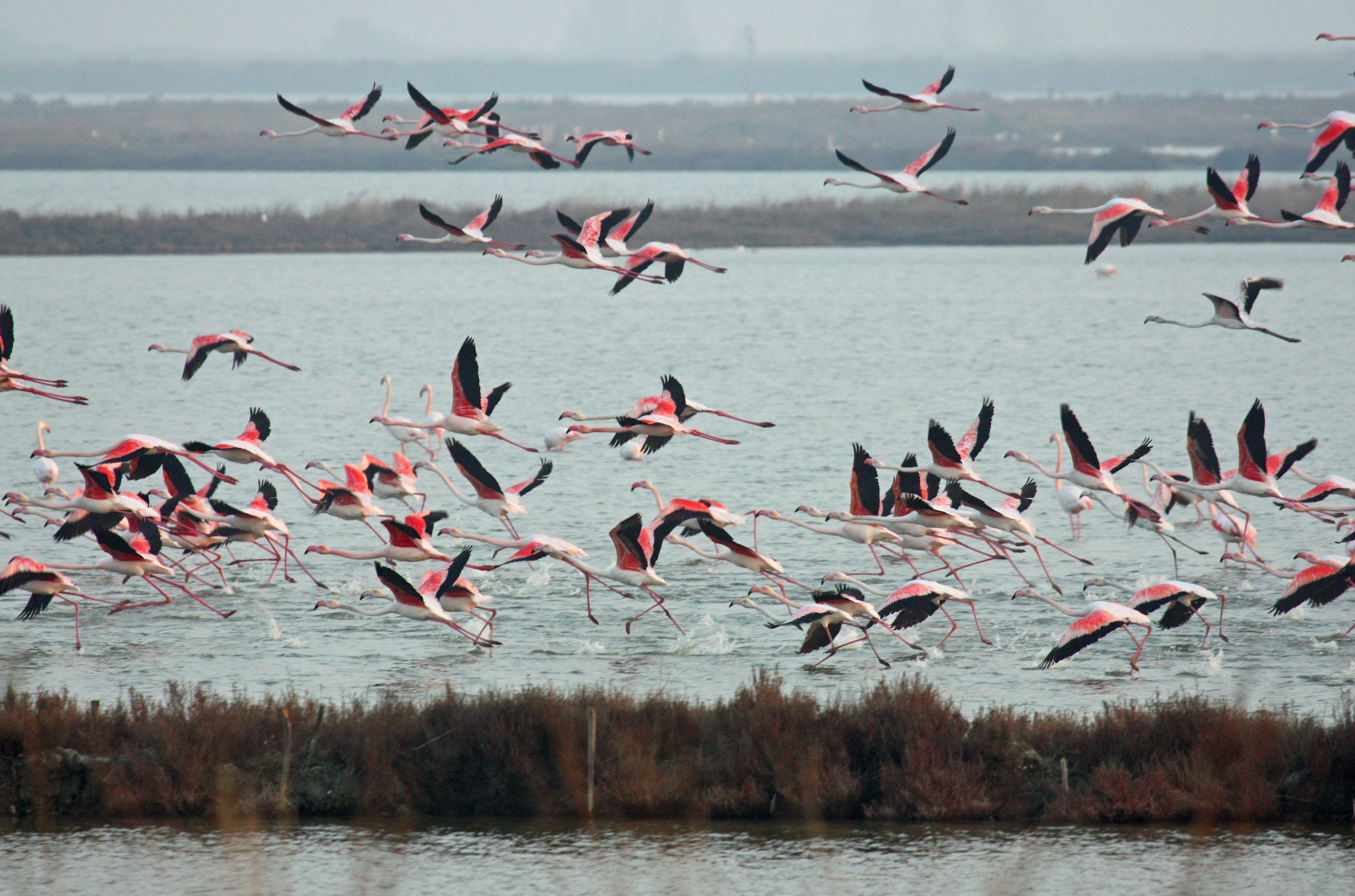
Flamingos in the delta of the Po river

== Government and politics ==
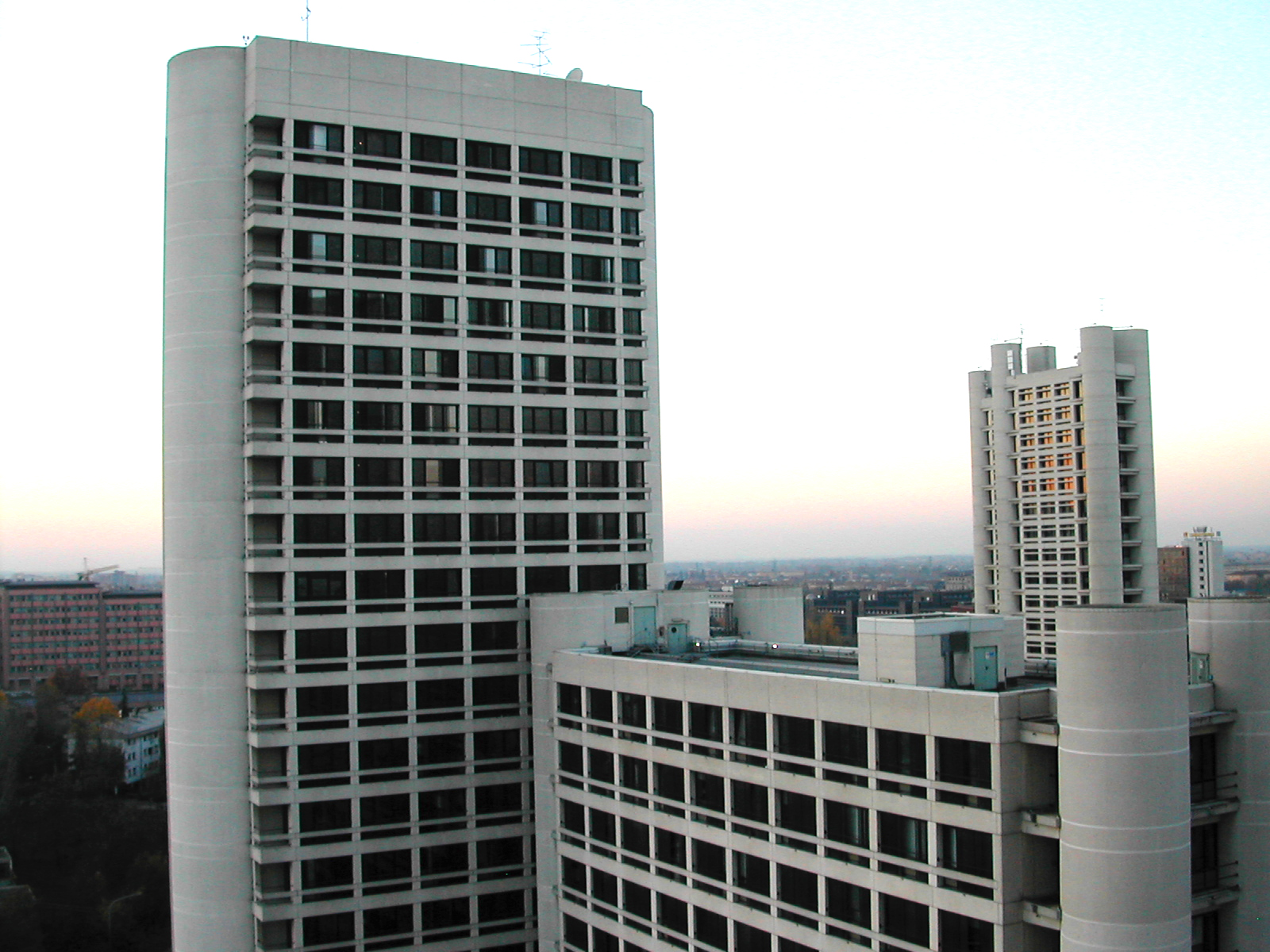
Seat of the Regional Assembly of Emilia-Romagna in Bologna

The Regional Government (Giunta Regionale) is presided by the President of the Region (Presidente della Regione), who is elected for a five-year term. The Regional Government is composed of the President and the Ministers (Assessori), of which there are currently twelve including the Vice President and the Under-Secretary for the President's office.

Apart from the province of Piacenza, Emilia-Romagna was historically a stronghold of the Italian Communist Party, forming the Italian "Red Quadrilateral" or sometimes called the "Red Belt" with Tuscany, Umbria and Marche. This is probably due to the strength of the anti-fascist resistance around the time of World War II as well as a strong tradition of anti-clericalism dating from the 19th century, when part of the region belonged to the Papal States. The strength of the anti-fascist resistance is one of the main factors, along with the effectiveness of trade-unionism, that led to the dominance of the PCI in the region.

Emilia-Romagna has since World War II been a left-wing stronghold, nowadays led by the Democratic Party, since its creation in 2007.

=== Administrative divisions ===
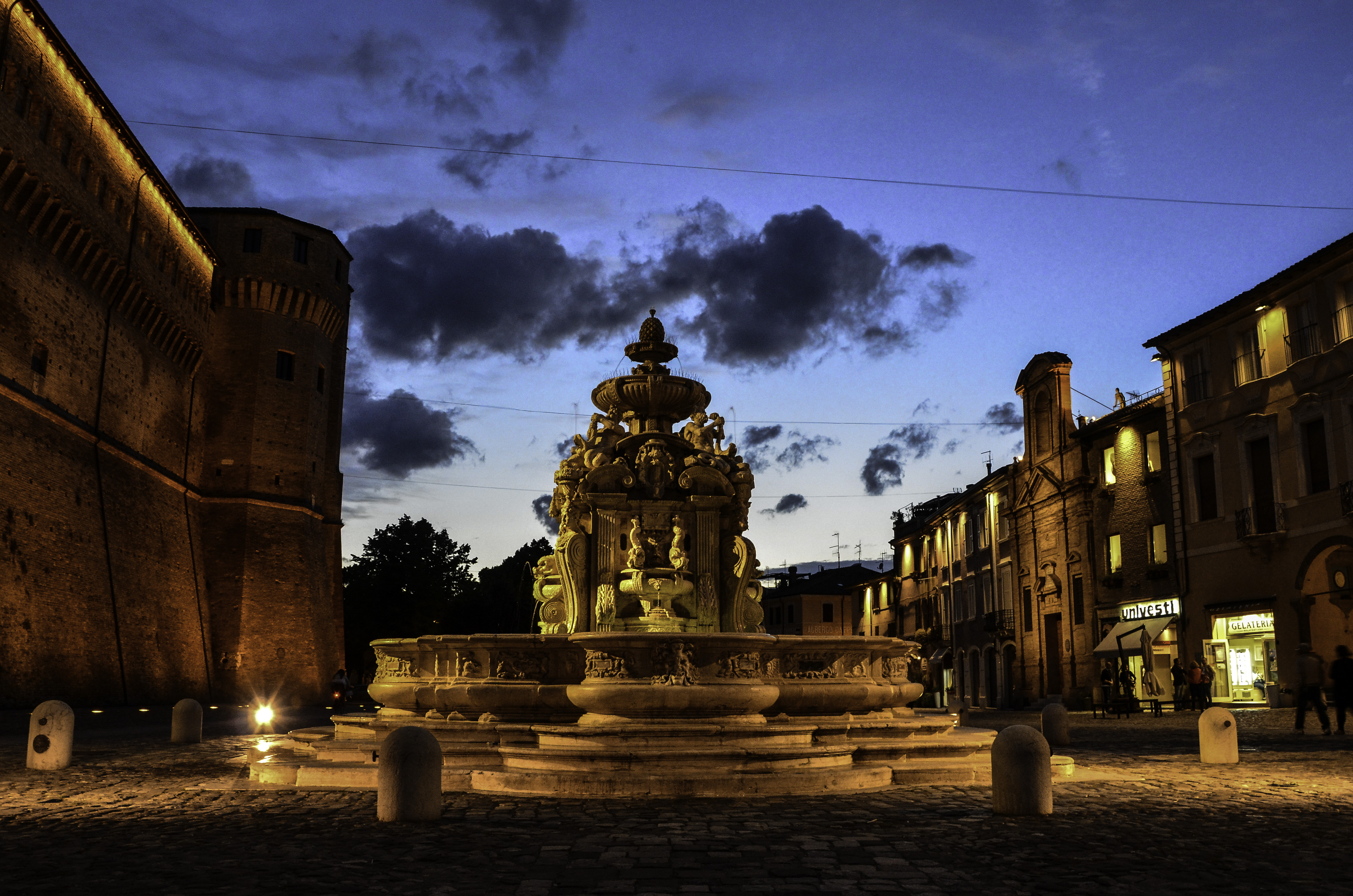
Piazza del Popolo in Cesena

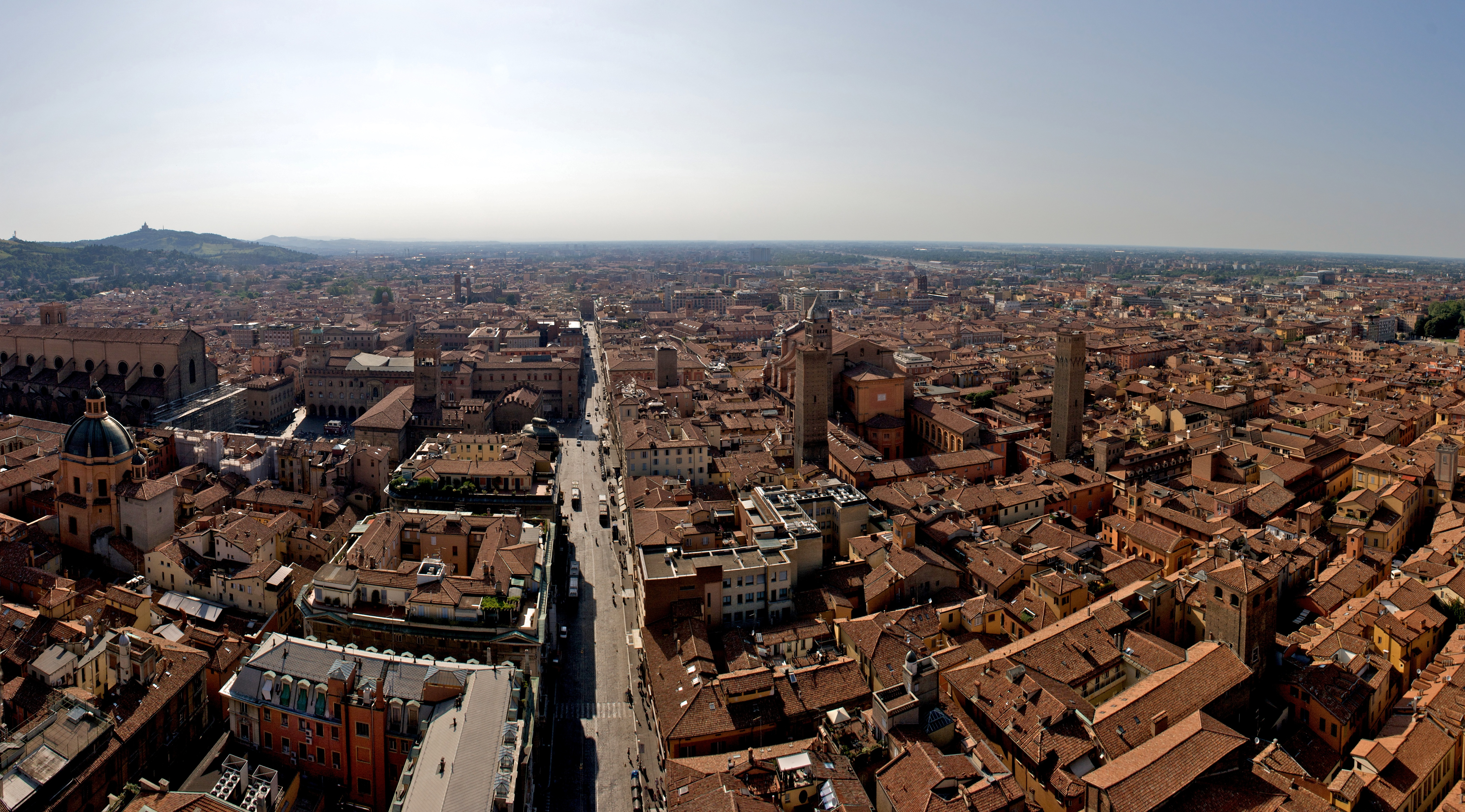
View of Bologna

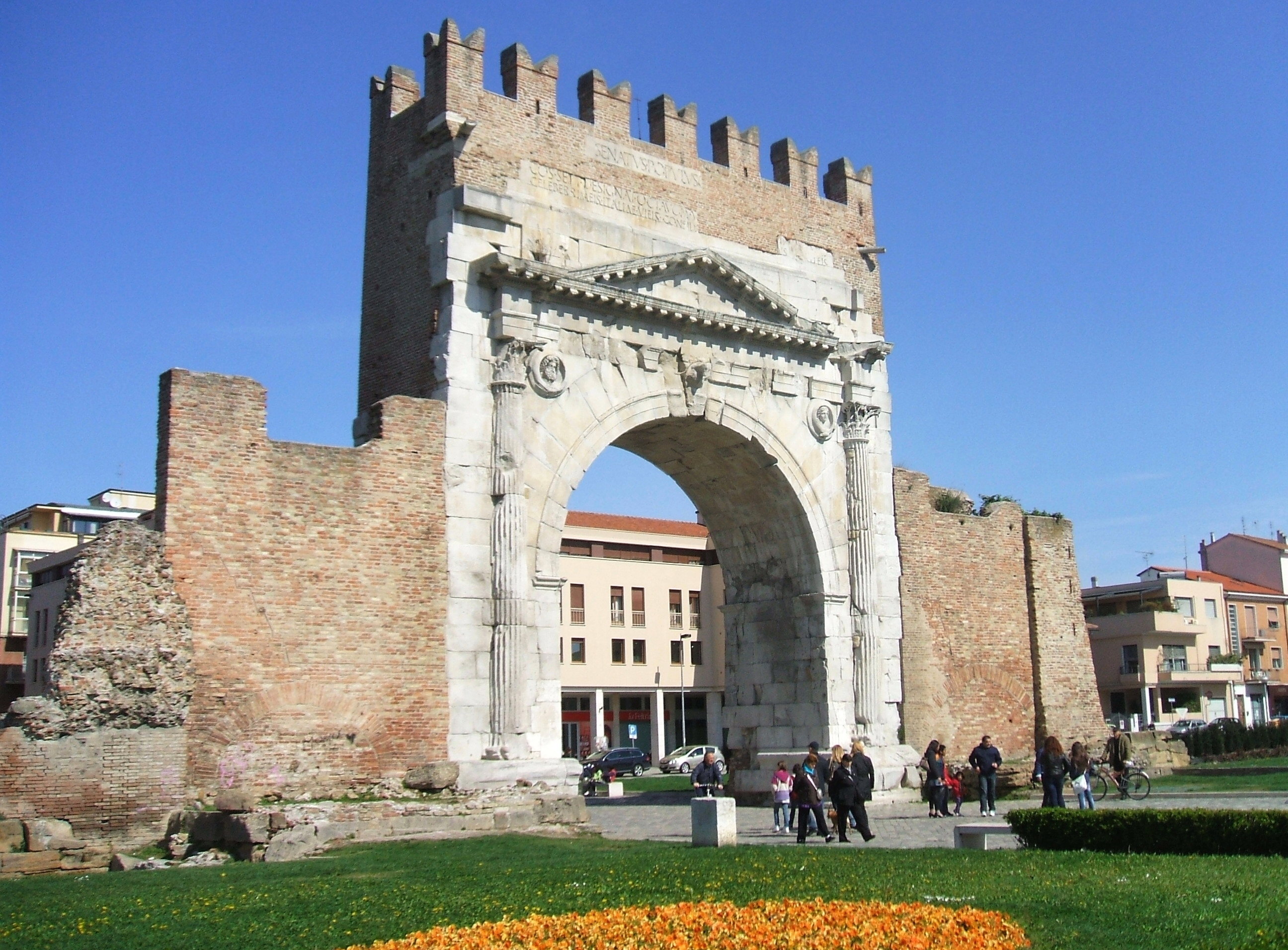
Arch of Augustus in Rimini

Emilia-Romagna is divided into nine provinces. Apart from the creation of the Metropolitan City of Bologna, plans to reduce the number of provinces from nine to four have been dropped.

Province	Population (2026)	Area (km^{2})	Density (inh./km^{2})	Region
Metropolitan City of Bologna	1,024,290	3,702.32	276.7	Emilia - Romagna
Province of Ferrara	340,482	2,635.12	129.2	Emilia
Province of Forlì-Cesena	394,337	2,378.40	165.8	Romagna
Province of Modena	711,502	2,688.02	264.7	Emilia
Province of Parma	457,509	3,447.48	132.7	Emilia
Province of Piacenza	287,745	2,585.86	111.3	Emilia
Province of Ravenna	387,743	1,859.44	208.5	Romagna
Province of Reggio Emilia	532,157	2,291.26	232.3	Emilia
Province of Rimini	341,244	921.77	370.2	Romagna

== Demographics ==
Historical population
Year	Pop.	±%
1861	2,102,490	—
1871	2,250,117	+7.0%
1881	2,313,302	+2.8%
1901	2,573,910	+11.3%
1911	2,841,580	+10.4%
1921	3,107,534	+9.4%
1931	3,298,757	+6.2%
1936	3,371,889	+2.2%
1951	3,578,018	+6.1%
1961	3,692,787	+3.2%
1971	3,866,218	+4.7%
1981	3,977,104	+2.9%
1991	3,928,841	−1.2%
2001	4,003,196	+1.9%
2011	4,344,755	+8.5%
2021	4,425,366	+1.9%
Source: ISTAT

As of 2026, the population is 4,477,009, of which 49.2% are male, and 50.8% are female. Minors make up 14.4% of the population, and seniors make up 25.2%.

The population density of 198.9 inhabitants per km^{2} is slightly above the national average of 195.1. The population of this region is traditionally evenly distributed, with no dominant metropolis but rather a line of medium-sized cities along the Via Emilia, where two thirds of the population and the majority of the industrial production are concentrated. The coast of Romagna is also densely populated due to the booming seaside tourism in recent decades. In the peripheral areas of the Apennine Mountains and the agricultural plains around Ferrara and Piacenza, the population is less dense.

=== Largest cities and towns ===
The region has nine cities with populations exceeding one hundred thousand: Bologna, Parma, Modena, Reggio Emilia, Ravenna, Rimini, Ferrara, Forlì and Piacenza. These cities rank among the 50 most populous in Italy. The regional capital, Bologna, has about 400,000 inhabitants and lies at the heart of a metropolitan area of about one million residents.

Largest cities or towns in Emilia-Romagna ISTAT - January 2026
Rank		Province	Pop.	Rank		Province	Pop.
1	Bologna	Bologna	391,473	11	Carpi	Modena	74,041
2	Parma	Parma	199,450	12	Imola	Bologna	69,702
3	Modena	Modena	184,361	13	Faenza	Ravenna	58,750
4	Reggio nell'Emilia	Reggio nell'Emilia	172,921	14	Sassuolo	Modena	41,123
5	Ravenna	Ravenna	156,475	15	Cento	Ferrara	35,836
6	Rimini	Rimini	150,774	16	Casalecchio di Reno	Bologna	35,359
7	Ferrara	Ferrara	129,048	17	Formigine	Modena	34,496
8	Forlì	Forlì	118,053	18	Riccione	Rimini	34,367
9	Piacenza	Piacenza	103,737	19	Castelfranco Emilia	Modena	33,625
10	Cesena	Forlì	95,620	20	San Lazzaro di Savena	Bologna	32,950

=== Migration ===
Between 1876 and 1976, about 1.2 million people emigrated from Emilia-Romagna to other countries.

Foreign population by country of birth (2025)
Country of birth	Population
Albania	77,092
Morocco	74,090
Romania	68,594
Moldova	48,620
Ukraine	41,681
Pakistan	31,313
Tunisia	24,842
India	23,477
China	22,731
Senegal	15,459
Bangladesh	15,190
Nigeria	14,972
Philippines	13,455
Germany	11,453
Ghana	11,194

As of 2025, Emilia-Romagna has the highest share of immigrants out of all Italian regions, as they make up 15.9% of the population. The 5 largest foreign countries of birth are Albania, Morocco, Romania, Moldova, and Ukraine.

=== Language ===
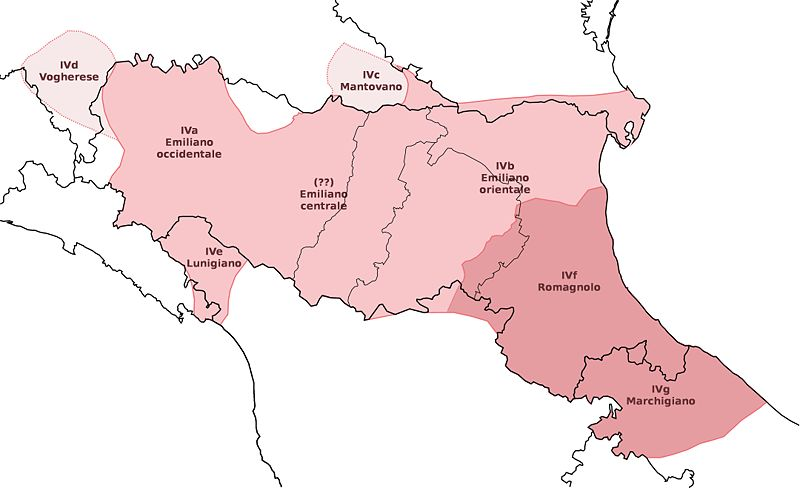
Emilian language Romagnol language Transition between Emilian and Lombard language

Emilian–Romagnol (Italian: emiliano-romagnolo) is a linguistic continuum that is part of the Gallo-Italic languages spoken in the northern Italian region of Emilia-Romagna. It is divided into two main varieties, Emilian and Romagnol.

As part of the Gallo-Italic languages, Emilian–Romagnol is most closely related to the Lombard, Piedmontese and Ligurian languages, all of which are spoken in neighboring regions.

Among other Gallo-Italic languages, Emilian–Romagnol is characterized by systematic raising and diphthongization of Latin stressed vowels in open syllables, as well as widespread syncope of unstressed vowels other than /a/ and use of vowel gradation in the formation of plurals and certain verb tenses.

Apart from standard Italian, Emilian and Romagnolo, two closely related languages that are part of the Emiliano-Romagnolo language family, are the local languages of Emilia-Romagna. They are Romance languages spoken in the region, in Northern Marche and other nearby areas such as parts of Massa-Carrara, Mantua, Pavia and Rovigo provinces and in San Marino. The Sillaro river (Emilian: Séllar in Emilian), near the town of Castel San Pietro Terme, is the border between Emilia and Romagna. They belong to the Northern Italian group within Romance languages (like Piedmontese, Lombard, Ligurian and Venetian), which is included in the wider group of western Romance languages (including French, Occitan and Catalan). They are considered minority languages, structurally separated from Italian by the Ethnologue and by the Red Book of Endangered Languages of UNESCO.

== Culture ==
=== Cinema ===
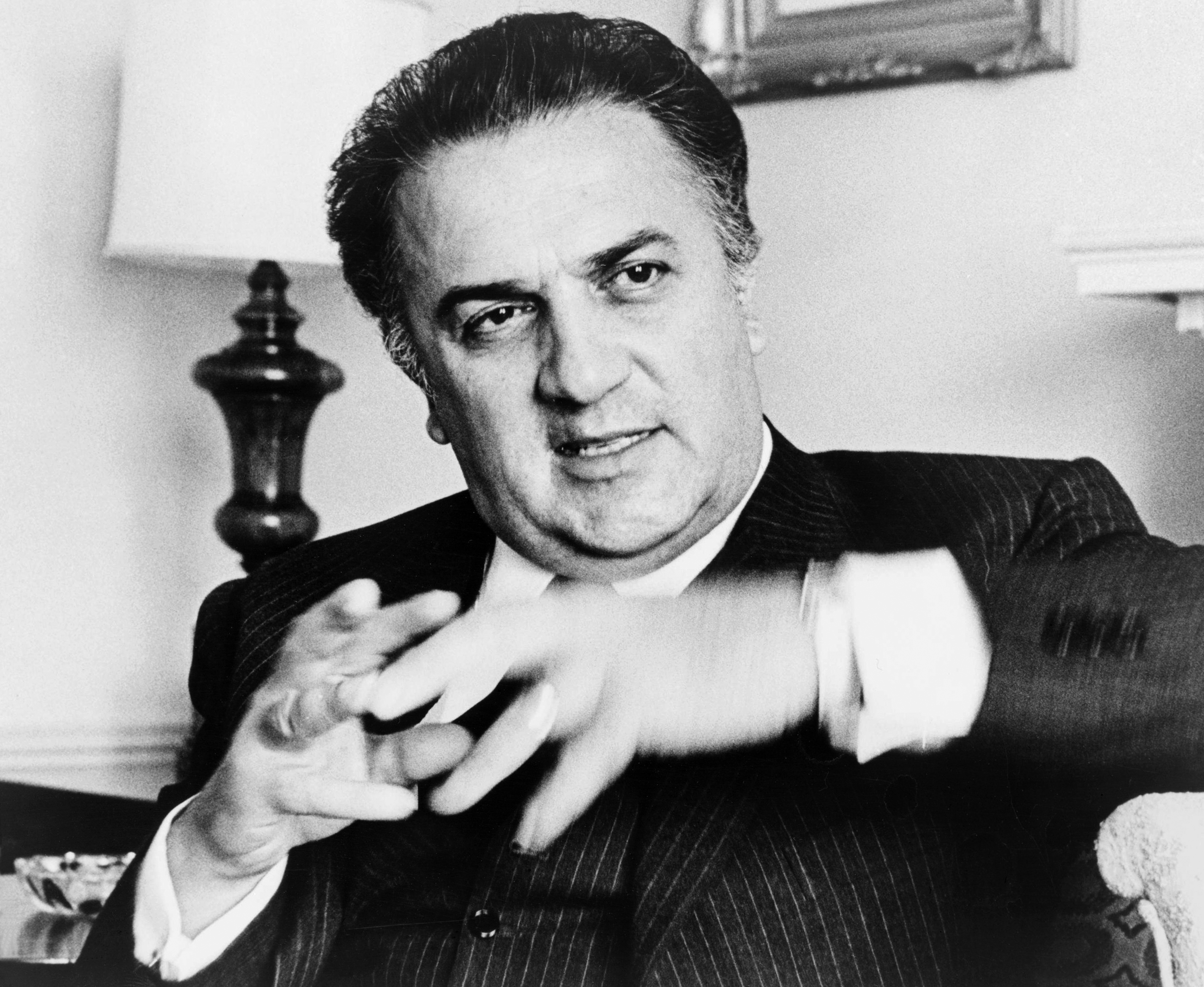
Federico Fellini

Emilia-Romagna has given birth to a number of important filmmakers and actors and was the main setting for numerous important movies. Bernardo Bertolucci was a native of Parma and his 1976 masterpiece, 1900, was partially set in Emilia-Romagna. Federico Fellini, a native of Rimini, shot many movies in the region, among them Amarcord. Pier Paolo Pasolini, a native of Bologna, in addition to being a film director, was a poet, writer, and intellectual, who also distinguished himself as an actor, journalist, novelist, playwright, and political figure. Michelangelo Antonioni, a native of Ferrara, shot his 1964 movie Red Desert in Ravenna. Florestano Vancini, also from Ferrara, shot there his 1960 film Long Night in 1943. Pupi Avati, a native of Bologna, shot numerous movies in the region, including the 1976 horror-thriller The House with Laughing Windows. Marco Bellocchio, a native of Bobbio, near Piacenza, directed many award-winning movies, such as his 2009 biopic Vincere. Liliana Cavani, a native of Carpi, near Modena, became internationally known after the success of her 1974 feature film The Night Porter. In addition, actor and filmmaker Vittorio De Sica shot in Ferrara his 1970 movie The Garden of the Finzi-Continis. Other actors from Emilia-Romagna include Gino Cervi, who played Peppone in the Don Camillo 1950s–1960s movie series; Rossano Brazzi, who acted in numerous English-language films, including the 1954 drama film The Barefoot Contessa; and the 1980s comedy duo Gigi e Andrea.

=== Cuisine and gastronomy ===
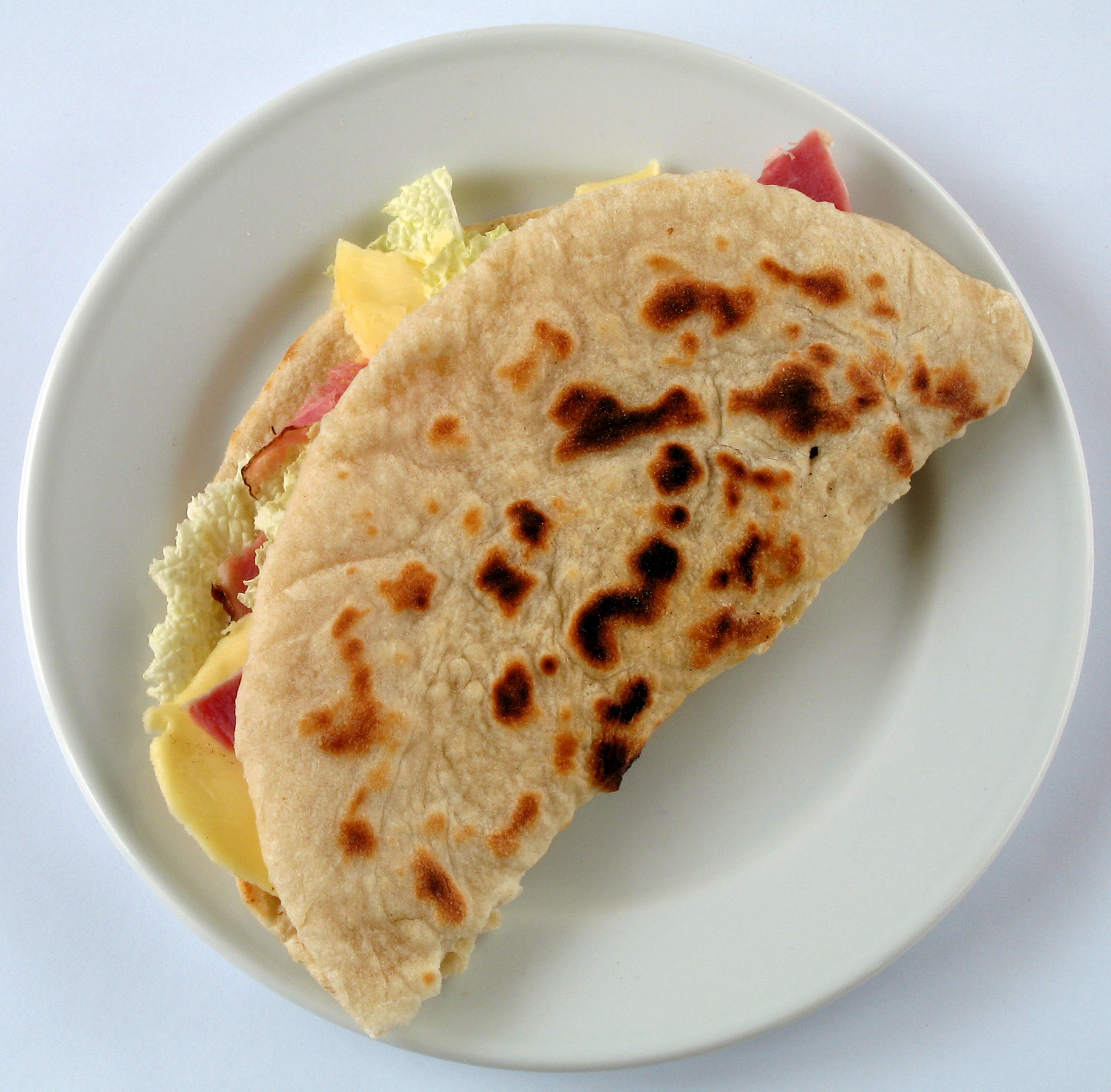
Piadina

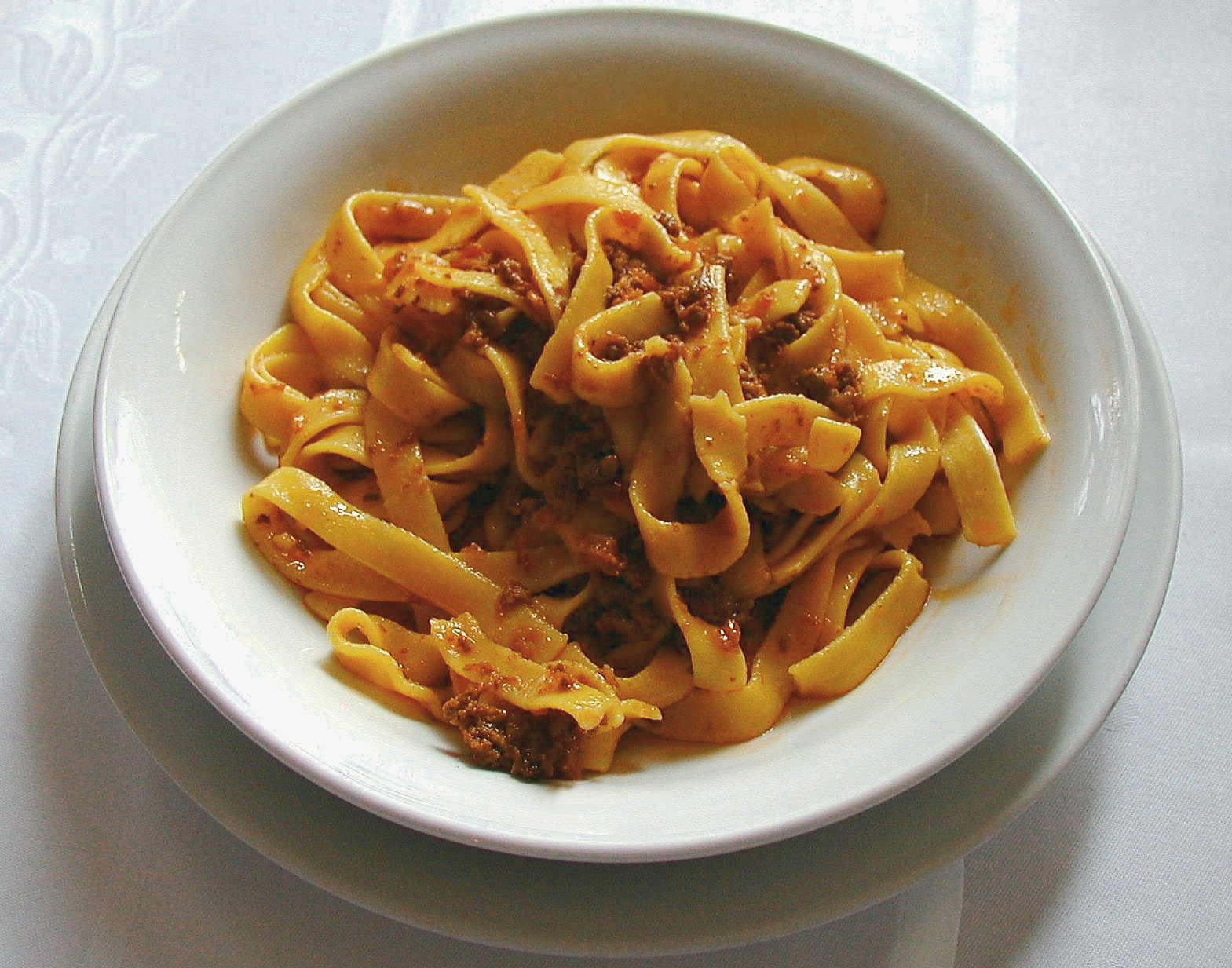
Tagliatelle with ragù

Emilia-Romagna is considered one of the richest regions of Italy with regard to its gastronomic and wine-making tradition. The region is known for its egg and filled pasta made with soft wheat flour. Bologna is notable for pasta dishes like tortellini, lasagne, gramigna and tagliatelle made by sfoglini out of sfoglia. These are found also in many other parts of the region in different declinations. The Romagna subregion is known as well for pasta dishes like garganelli, strozzapreti, sfoglia lorda and tortelli alla lastra. In the Emilia subregion, except Piacenza which is heavily influenced by the cuisines of Lombardy where rice is more common, rice is eaten to a lesser extent. Polenta, a maize-based dish, is common both in Emilia and Romagna. The celebrated balsamic vinegar is made only in the Emilian cities of Modena and Reggio Emilia, following legally binding traditional procedures. Parmigiano Reggiano (Parmesan Cheese) is produced in Reggio Emilia, Parma, Modena and Bologna and is much used in cooking, while Grana Padano variety is produced in the rest of the region.

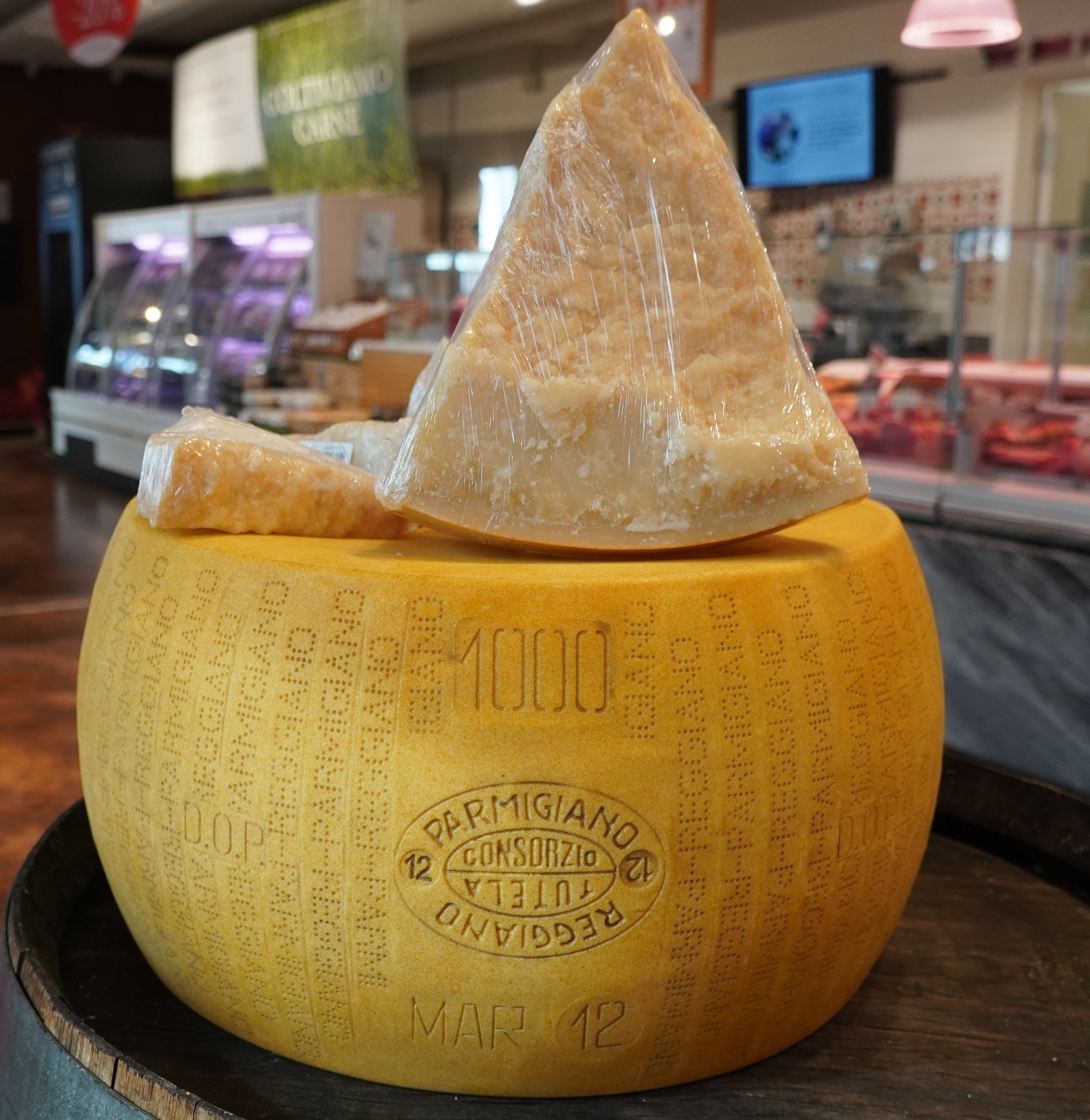
Parmesan cheese

Although the Adriatic coast is a major fishing area which produces eels and clams, the region produces more meat products, especially pork-based, including Parma's prosciutto, culatello and Salame Felino, Piacenza's pancetta, coppa and salami, Bologna's mortadella and salame rosa, Modena's zampone, cotechino and cappello del prete and Ferrara's salama da sugo. Reggio Emilia is the origin of the fresh egg-made pasta cappelletti (similar to Bologna's tortellini but differing in size), the typical Erbazzone Reggiano (Emilian spinach cheese pie) and Parmigiano Reggiano salted cake, and Gnocco Fritto, mixed flour stripes fried in boiling oil, eaten in combination with ham or salami. Crescentina, also improperly called tigella, is a thin round bread that originates in the Apennines around Modena and is usually filled with cunza (a spread made from pork lard and flavoured with garlic and rosemary) or with cold cuts, cheese and salty dressings or sweet spreads. Piacenza and Ferrara are also known for some dishes prepared with horse and donkey meat. Regional desserts include zuppa inglese (custard-based dessert made with sponge cake and Alchermes liqueur) and panpepato (Christmas cake made with pepper, chocolate, spices, and almonds). An exhaustive list of the most important regional wines should include Sangiovese from Romagna, Lambrusco from Reggio Emilia or Modena, Cagnina di Romagna, Gutturnio and Trebbiano from Piacenza.

=== Music ===
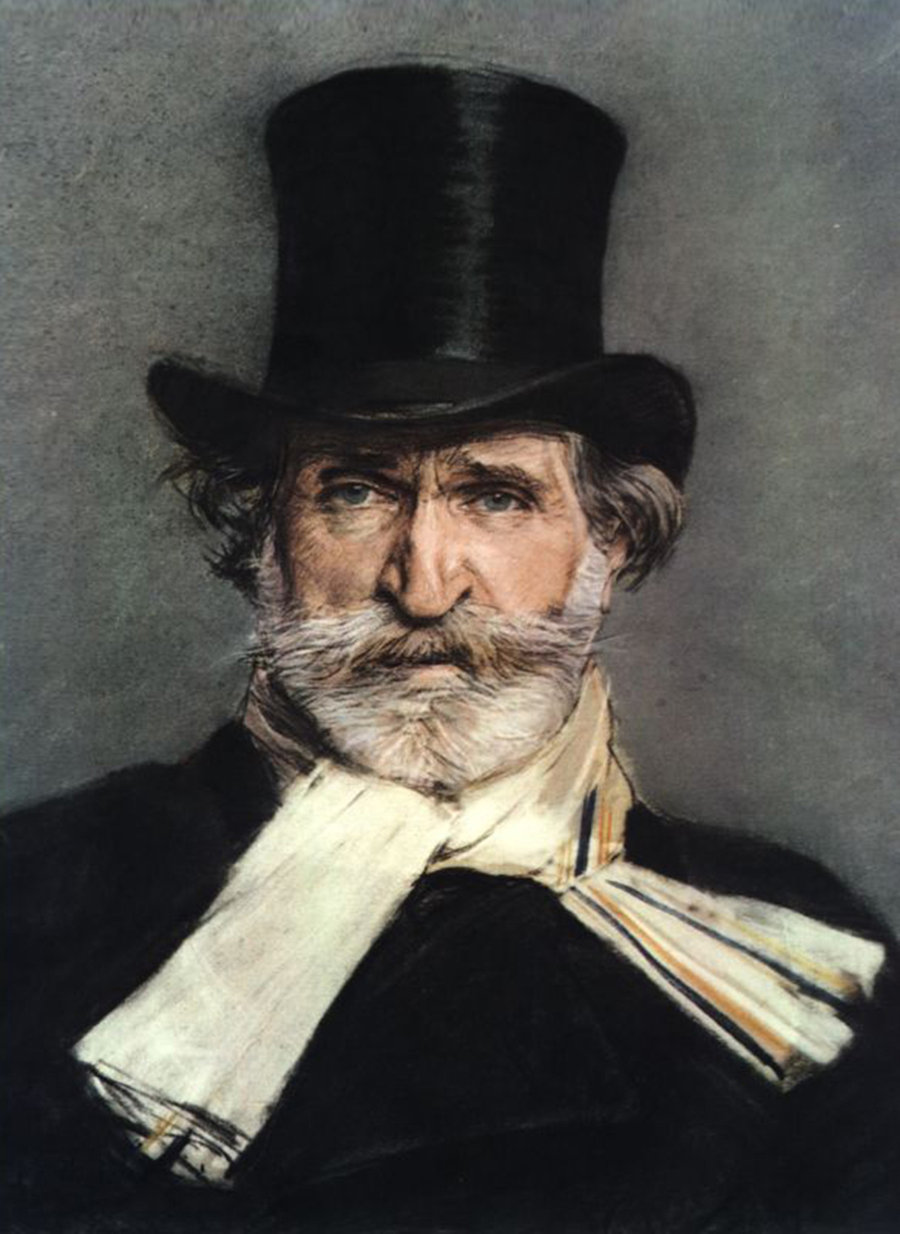
Giuseppe Verdi, one of the most popular and acclaimed opera composers

Emilia-Romagna gave birth to one of the most important composers in the history of music, Giuseppe Verdi, as well as Arturo Toscanini, one of the most acclaimed conductors of the 20th century, and the operatic tenor Luciano Pavarotti.

The region is well known in Italy for its rock and folk musicians, such as Laura Pausini, Raffaella Carrà, Samuele Bersani, Luciano Ligabue, Lucio Dalla, Francesco Guccini, Vasco Rossi and Zucchero. "Romagna mia", a song written in 1954 by Secondo Casadei, is considered by many as the unofficial anthem of Romagna.

== Economy ==
Emilia-Romagna today is considered one of the richest European regions and the third wealthiest Italian region by gross domestic product (GDP) per capita. These results have been achieved by developing a balanced integration of agriculture and manufacturing and of different industries.

=== Agriculture ===
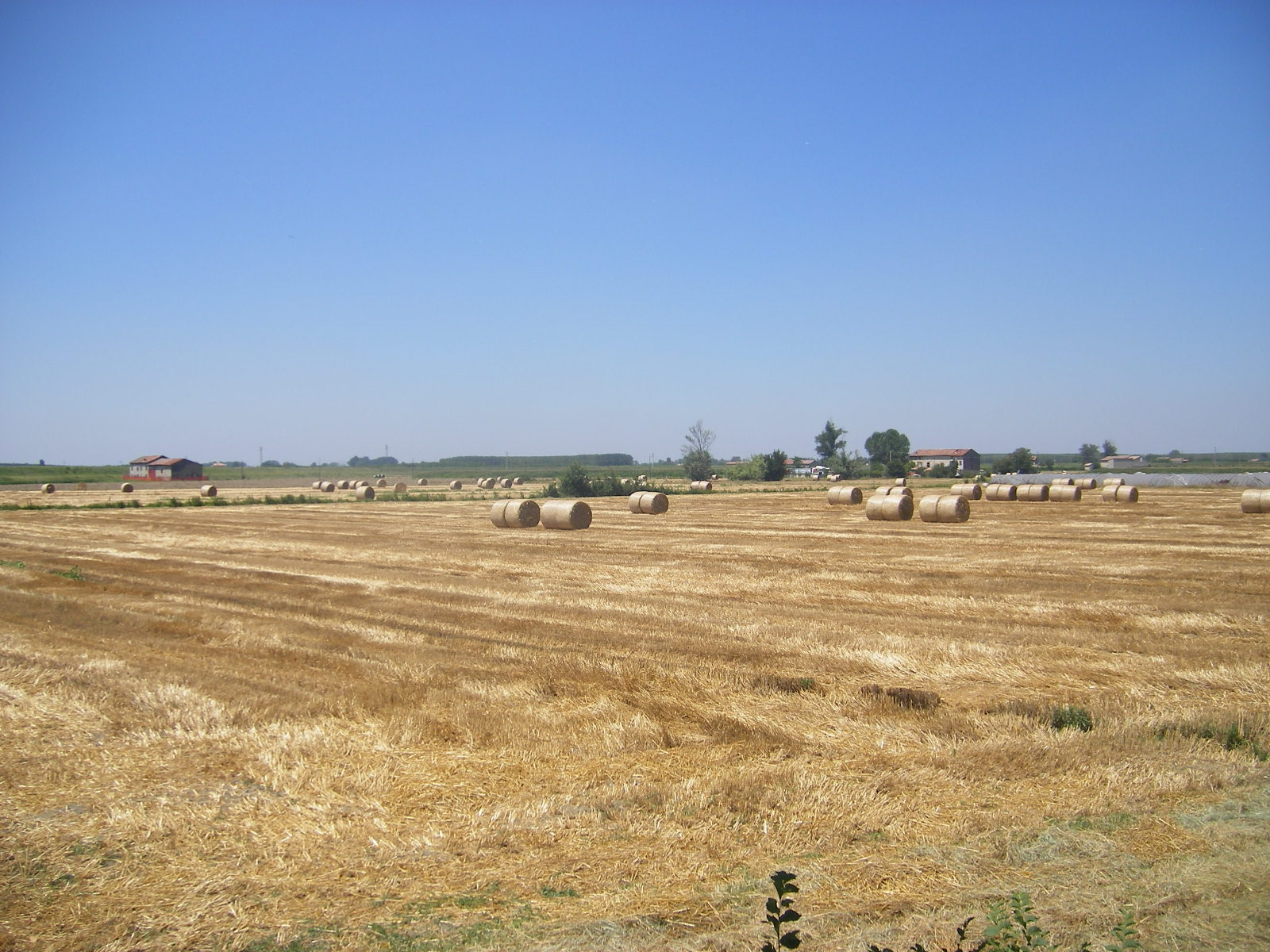
Wheat fields in province of Reggio Emilia

In spite of the depth and variety of industrial activities in the region, agriculture has not been eclipsed. Emilia-Romagna is among the leading regions in the country, with farming contributing 5.8% of the gross regional product. The agricultural sector has aimed for increased competitiveness by means of structural reorganisation and high-quality products, and this has led to the success of marketed brands. Cereals, potatoes, maize, tomatoes and onions are the most important products, along with fruit and grapes for the production of wine (of which the best known are Emilia's Lambrusco, Bologna's Pignoletto, Romagna's Sangiovese and white Albana). Alongside cereals, which for centuries remained the first local product, the cultivation of fruit trees has developed (especially peaches, but also apricots, plums, apples and pears).

Cattle and pig breeding are also highly developed. Farm cooperatives have been working along these lines in recent years. With their long tradition in the region there are now about 8,100 cooperatives, generally in the agricultural sector and mainly located in the provinces of Bologna (2,160) and Forlì-Cesena (1,300).

=== Industry ===
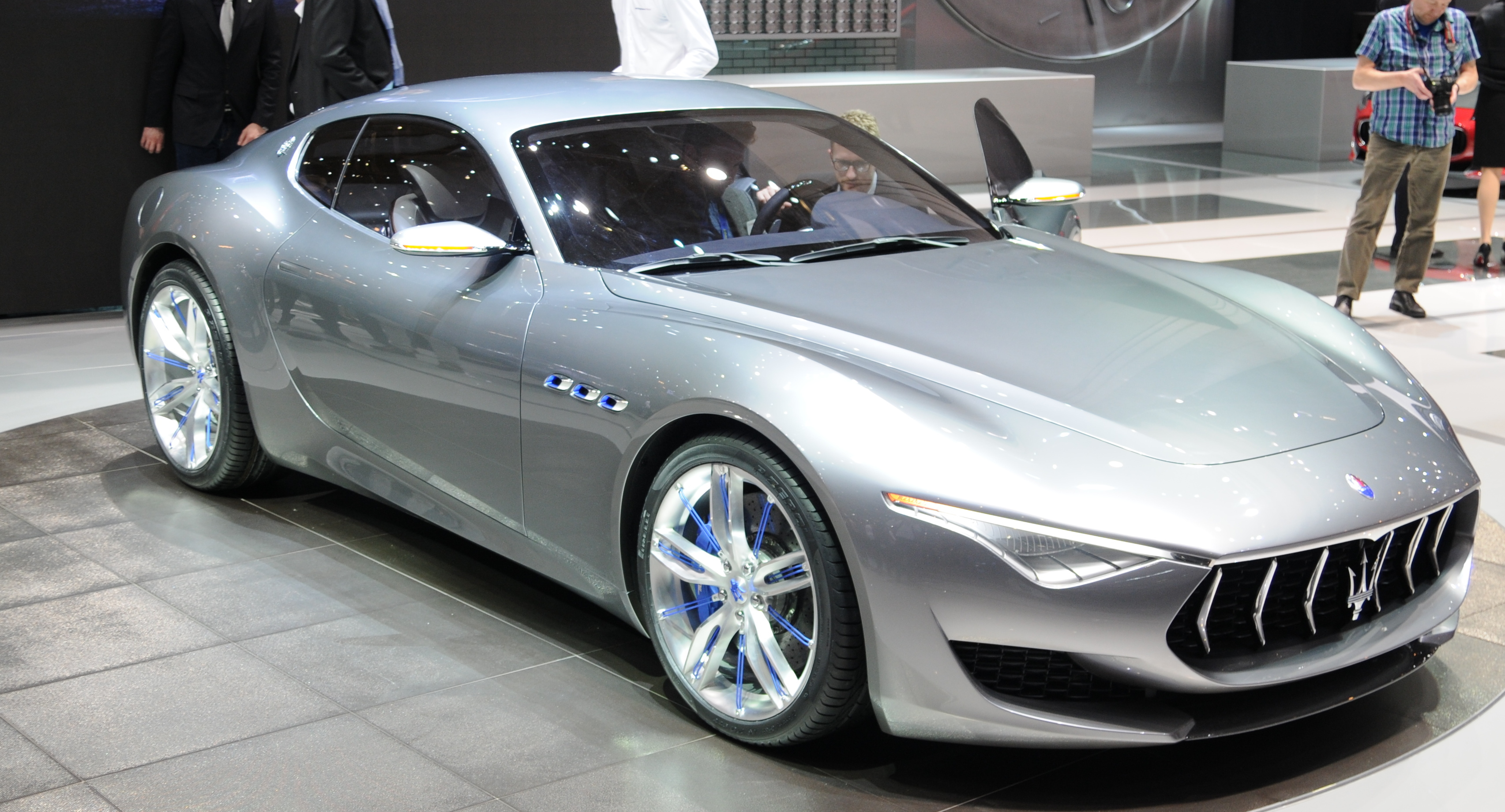
Maserati Alfieri

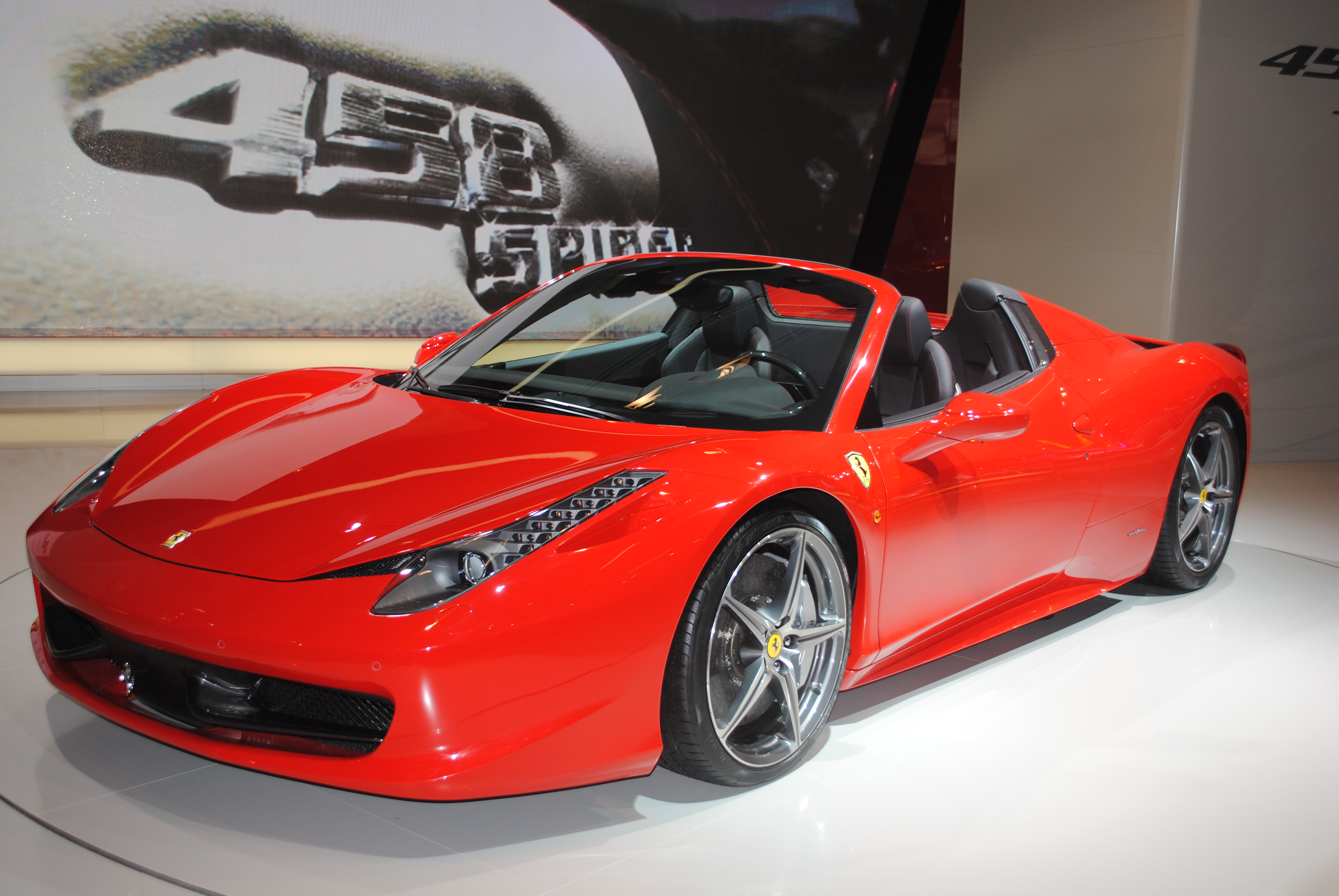
Ferrari 458 Spider

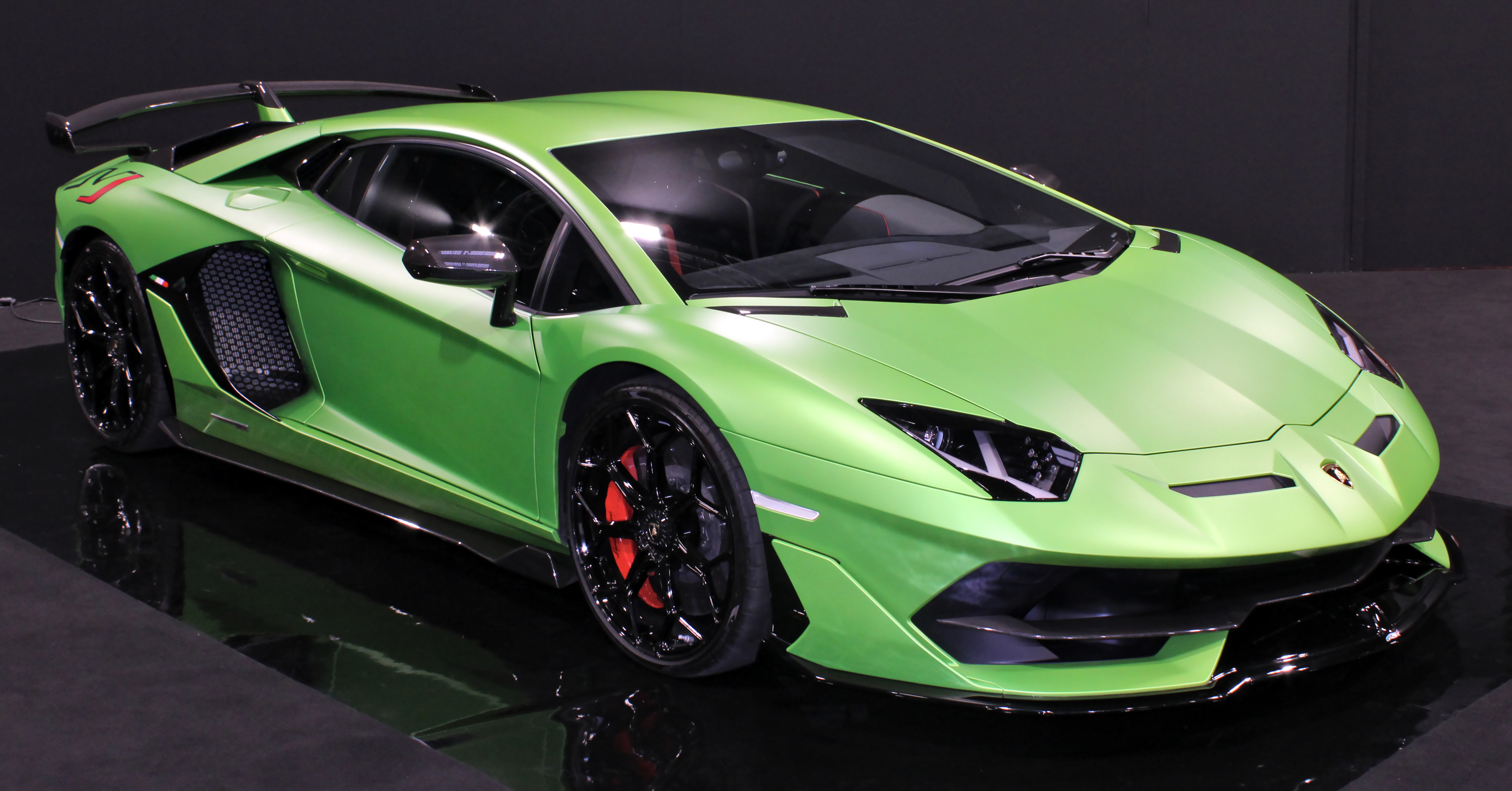
Lamborghini Aventador

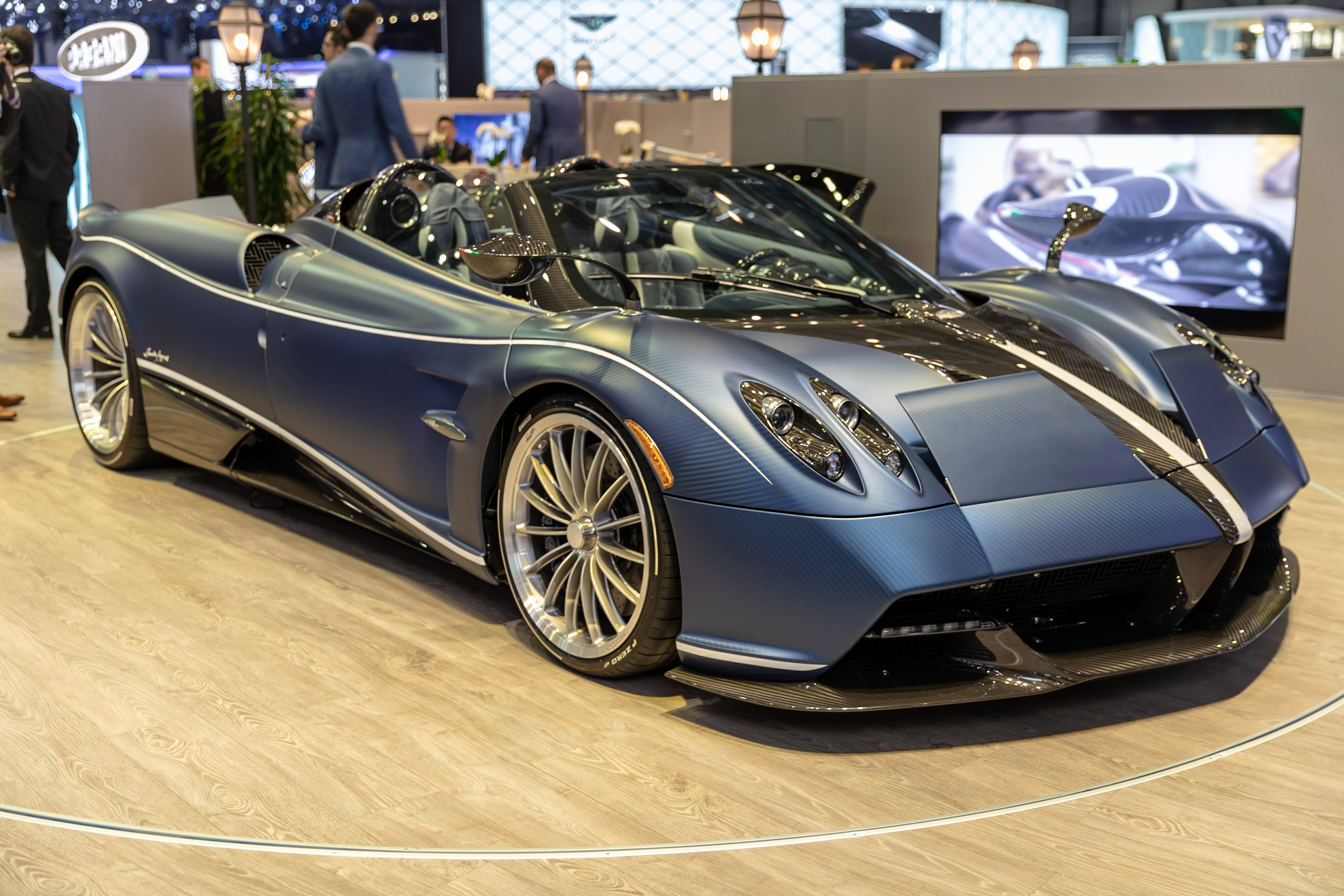
Pagani Huayra

The regional economy is more geared to export markets than other regions in the country: the main exports are from mechanical engineering (53%), the extraction of non-metallic minerals (13%) and the clothing industry (10%). Industry in the region presents a varied and complex picture and is located along the Via Emilia.

The food industry (e.g. Barilla, Parmalat, Granarolo, Zanetti, Grandi Salumifici Italiani, Cremonini, Fini, Conserve Italia) is particularly concentrated in Parma, Modena and Bologna. Very important is production of Parma ham, Parmesan and Grana Padano cheeses, Modena balsamic vinegar, and Mortadella sausages. It is not restricted to these famous products, but also include production of sausages, other cheese, dairy products, coffee, sugar, fruit and vegetable conserves and stuffed pasta.

Automotive industry produces sports cars (Ferrari, Lamborghini, Maserati, Pagani), trucks (Astra), buses (Menarinibus) and motorcycles (Ducati, Bimota).

Machine building is represented with fork-lifts (OM Still, FMTH Fantuzzi), skid-steer loader (CNH Industrial), tractors (Argo, Goldoni, Arbos), motors (VM Motori, Lombardini), vehicle gas-fuel equipment (Landi Renzo), undercarriages (ThyssenKrupp Berco), ceramic machine (SACMI), packaging machine (Coesia, SACMI, IMA), pumps (Interpump), wood-working machine tools (SCM Group), home appliance (Smeg, Saeco), automatic data capture equipment (Datalogic) etc.

There is a chemical industrial park in Ferrara, where different companies manufacturing polyethylene, polypropylene, synthetic rubber and nitrogenous fertilizers. Other industrial park is Mirandola Biomedical District. In Parma there is pharmaceutical manufacturing from Chiesi Farmaceutici.

Sport and fitness articles is manufacturing by Technogym in Cesena.

The ceramic sector is concentrated in Faenza and Sassuolo.

Footwear industry is well developed and located in 2 industrial districts San Mauro Pascoli and between Fusignano and Bagnacavallo.

=== Tourism ===
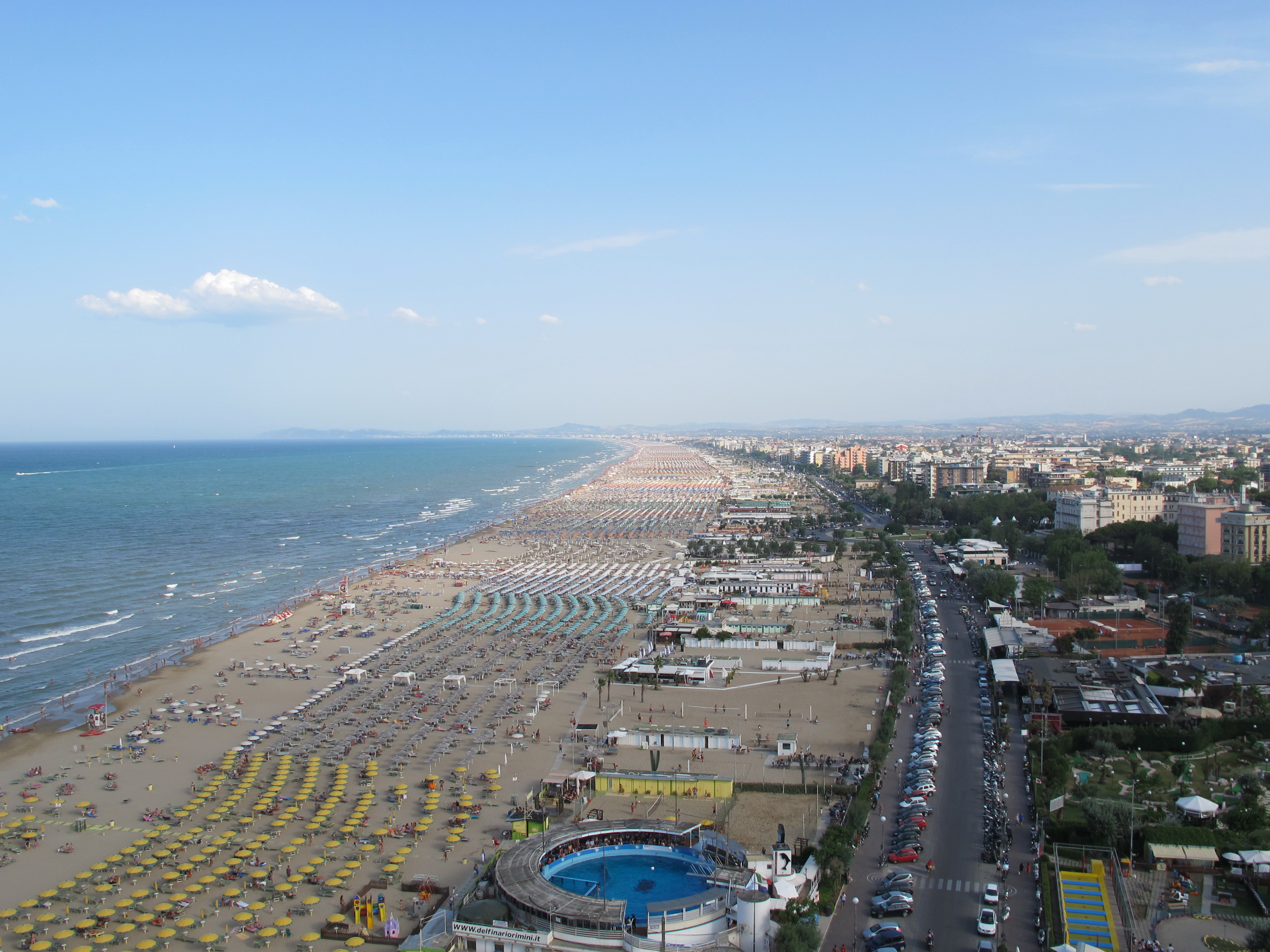
The beach and the coast of Rimini

Tourism is increasingly important, especially along the Adriatic coastline and the cities of art. The coast is a tourist attraction both in summer, for its rich and organized accommodation (over 5,000 hotels), and in other low-season periods thanks to the numerous youth entertainment venues. In 2022, over 42 million presences and 7 million arrivals were recorded. The most popular location for seaside tourism is Rimini. Winter tourism is also good in the ski resorts of the Apennines, including Sestola, Monte Cimone and Corno alle Scale. Tourism in the cities of art is very flourishing, especially from abroad. Overall, in 2022, over 60 million tourist presences were recorded in the region with almost 14 million arrivals.

Emilia-Romagna has many small and picturesque villages, 16 of them have been selected by I Borghi più belli d'Italia (English: The most beautiful Villages of Italy), a non-profit private association of small Italian towns of strong historical and artistic interest, that was founded on the initiative of the Tourism Council of the National Association of Italian Municipalities. These villages are:

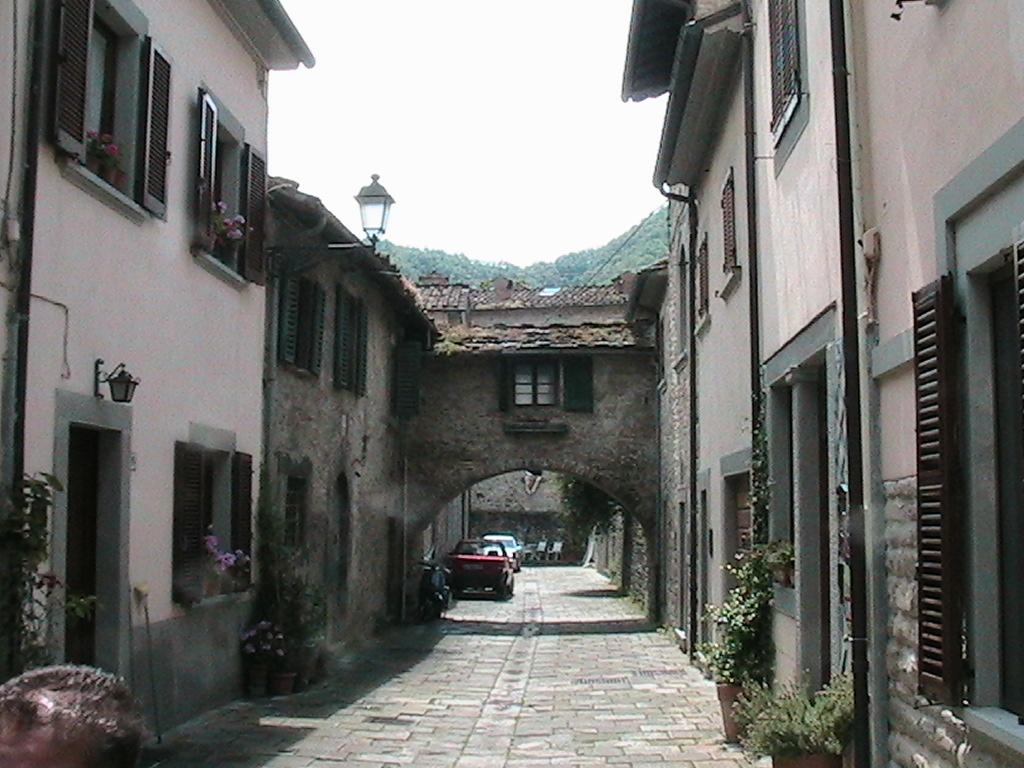
Bagno di Romagna

- Bagnara di Romagna
- Bagno di Romagna
- Bobbio
- Brisighella
- Castell'Arquato
- Compiano
- Dozza
- Fiumalbo
- Gualtieri
- Montechiarugolo
- Montefiore Conca
- Montegridolfo
- San Giovanni in Marignano
- San Leo
- Verucchio
- Vigoleno

=== Unemployment rate ===
The unemployment rate stood at 5.1% in 2022 and was lower than the national average of 8.1%.

Year	2006	2007	2008	2009	2010	2011	2012	2013	2014	2015	2016	2017	2018	2019	2020	2021	2022
unemployment rate (in %)	3.4%	2.8%	3.2%	4.6%	5.6%	5.2%	7.0%	8.4%	8.3%	7.7%	6.9%	6.5%	5.9%	5.5%	5.7%	5.6%	5.1%

== Sport ==
=== Motorsports ===
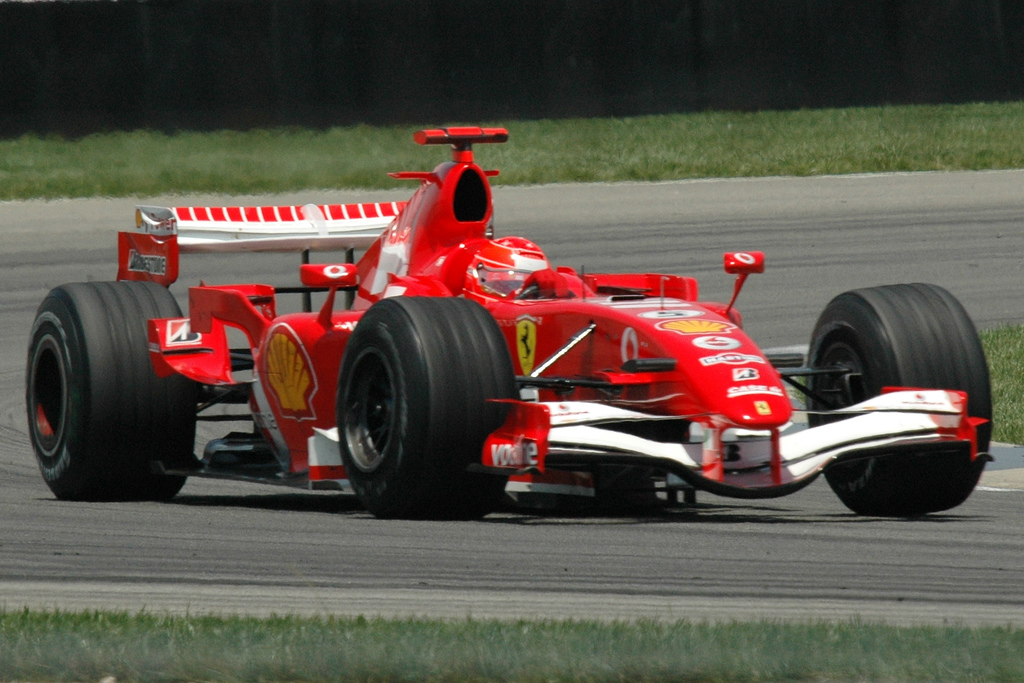
A Ferrari 248 F1 by Scuderia Ferrari, the oldest surviving team in Grand Prix racing, having competed since 1948, and statistically the most successful Formula One team in history

Ferrari's motorsports division Scuderia Ferrari is also run out of Maranello in the Province of Modena, the teams' colours being red. Ferrari's Formula One team has won 15 Drivers' titles and 16 Constructors' titles. The team has also won multiple Le Mans 24 Hours in sports car racing. The most successful Ferrari driver is German racer Michael Schumacher, who won five consecutive Formula One titles between 2000 and 2004 with Ferrari, being the first Formula One driver to achieve that milestone. Among other legendary Ferrari drivers include pre-Formula One era Tazio Nuvolari, and in the Formula One era Alberto Ascari, Juan Manuel Fangio, John Surtees, Niki Lauda and Kimi Räikkönen include among drivers to have won the title in a Ferrari car. Another Formula 1 team is based here, RB Formula One Team in Faenza, the heir of Minardi and Scuderia Toro Rosso.

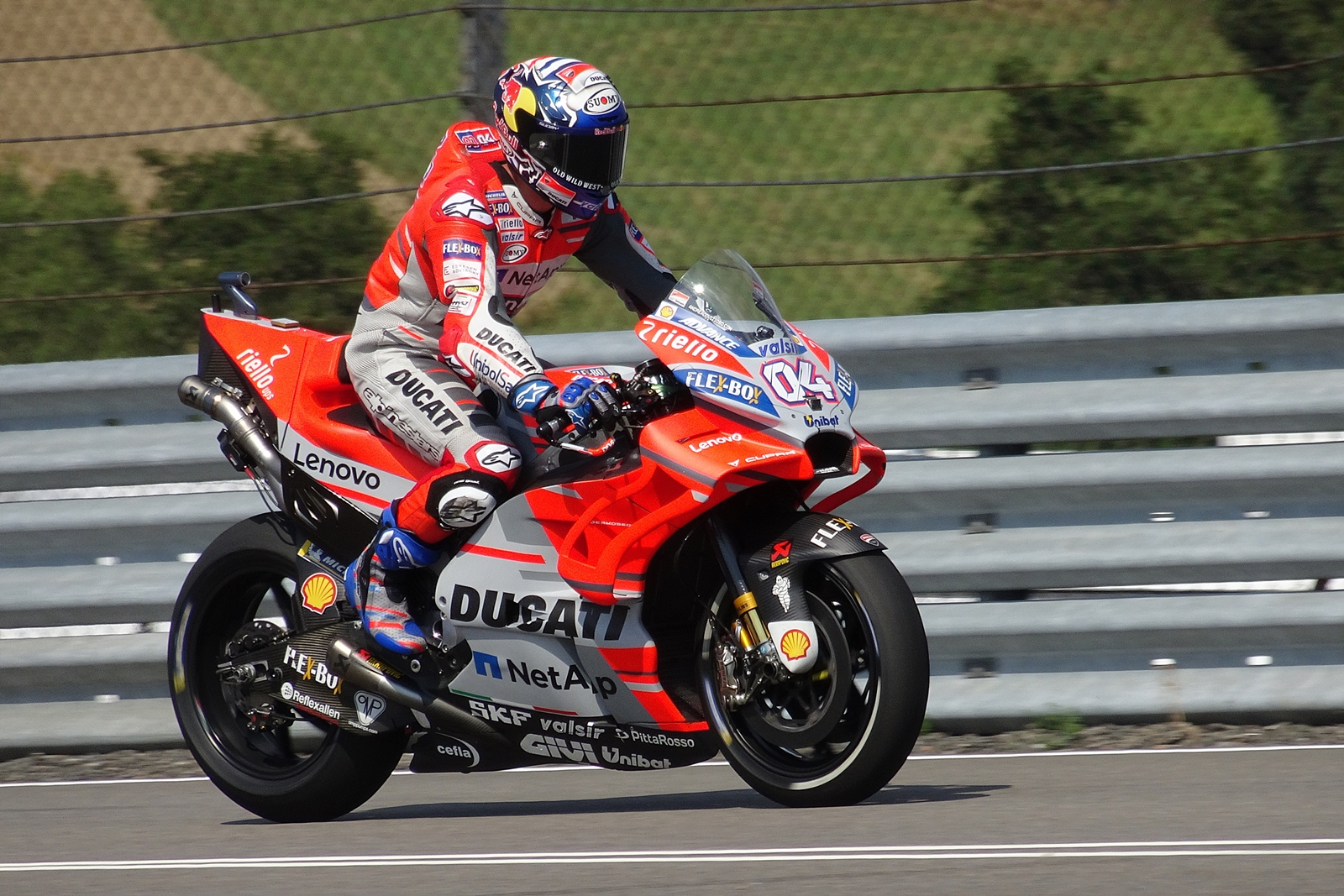
Ducati Desmosedici by Ducati Corse, one of the most successful motorcycle racing teams in history

Ducati Corse is the motorsports division of Ducati's motorcycle company, being the predominant Italian constructor in MotoGP and the Superbike World Championship. Ducati has won two MotoGP titles, with Australian Casey Stoner in 2007 and with Italian Pecco Bagnaia in 2022. Stoner is also the most successful rider for the team in MotoGP, having won 23 Grands Prix in his four seasons. Ducati have had multiple World Champions Valentino Rossi and Jorge Lorenzo race for the team. In 2017, Emilia-Romagna native Andrea Dovizioso finished second in the MotoGP championship for Ducati. The team has frequently had at least one Italian rider in its factory team since its entry into the premier class in 2003 at the beginning of the four-stroke engine era. Its first Grand Prix winner was Emilia-Romagna native Loris Capirossi in the team's inaugural season. Ducati have also won multiple Superbike titles with riders such as Carl Fogarty, Troy Bayliss, and Alvaro Bautista being among title winners.

Aside from Dovizioso and Capirossi, high-profile racers such as Marco Melandri and Marco Simoncelli have also come out of Emilia-Romagna. Simoncelli died in an accident when he was run over on track in the 2011 Malaysian Grand Prix at the age of 24, and was honoured by having the Misano World Circuit named after him.

Emilia-Romagna have two major international race circuits; Autodromo Enzo e Dino Ferrari in Imola and the aforementioned circuit in Misano Adriatico. Imola used to host Formula One between 1980 and 2006, under the banner of San Marino Grand Prix on all but one occasion; as well as hosting two non-championship races in 1963 and 1979. The track was the site for the fatal crash of three-time world champion Ayrton Senna on 1 May 1994, along with a fatal crash the day before of Austrian Roland Ratzenberger. The track was rebuilt after the tragedies and returned to the calendar in a new guise already the following year. Imola was a happy hunting ground for Emilia-Romagna team Scuderia Ferrari during the era on the re-built track, with Michael Schumacher winning the race five times in front of the home crowd. In 2020, Imola returned to the calendar due to the COVID-19 pandemic and hosted the Emilia Romagna Grand Prix.

=== Football ===
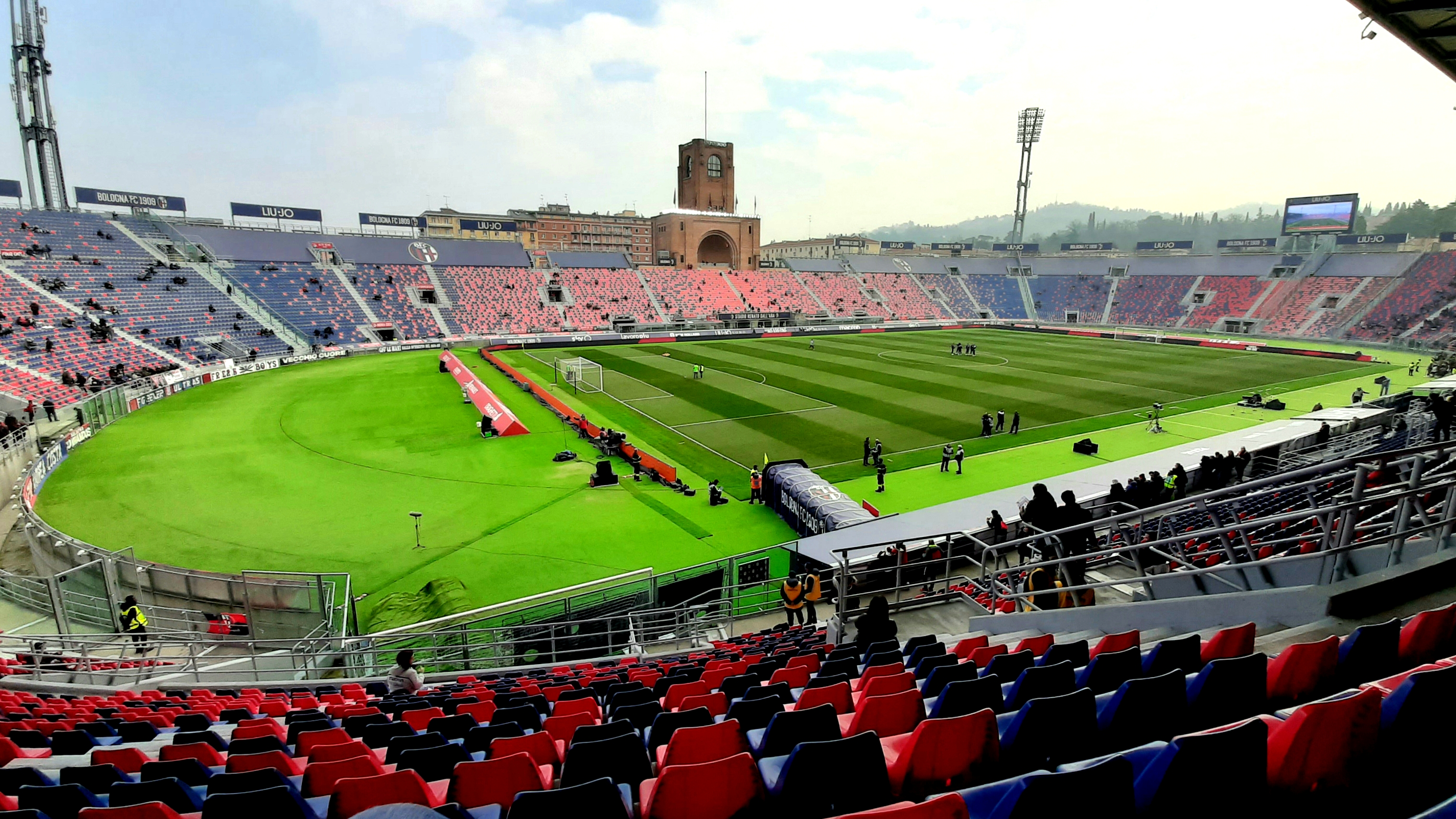
Stadio Renato Dall'Ara in Bologna

Several clubs from Emilia-Romagna compete at a high level on the national stage. Bologna, Parma, and Sassuolo compete in the top-flight of Italian football – in Serie A. The region's two biggest clubs are the only two to win major honours: Bologna, which has won seven scudetti and two Coppa Italia trophies, and Parma, winners of four European trophies (two Europa Leagues, one Cup Winners' Cup and one Super Cup) and three Coppe Italia.

The Derby dell'Emilia features Bologna and Parma, whereas the Derby dell'Enza features Parma and Reggiana.

The region has hosted 42 Italy national football team home matches. With 11 professional clubs in 2022/2023 season, the region is only bettered in terms of number of professional clubs by Lombardy. It also has 747 amateur clubs, 1,522 football pitches and 75,328 registered players.

Included in the table below are all sides in the top three tiers of Italian football (Serie A, Serie B and Serie C), as well as any sides that have won major honours.

Club	Town	Current division	Serie A seasons	Major trophies
Bologna	Bologna	Serie A	78	9
Carpi	Carpi	Serie C	1	0
Cesena	Cesena	Serie B	13	0
Forlì	Forlì	Serie C	0	0
Modena	Modena	Serie B	13	0
Parma	Parma	Serie A	28	8
Ravenna	Ravenna	Serie C	0	0
Reggiana	Reggio Emilia	Serie B	3	0
Rimini	Rimini	Serie C	0	0
Sassuolo	Sassuolo	Serie A	12	0

=== Other sports ===
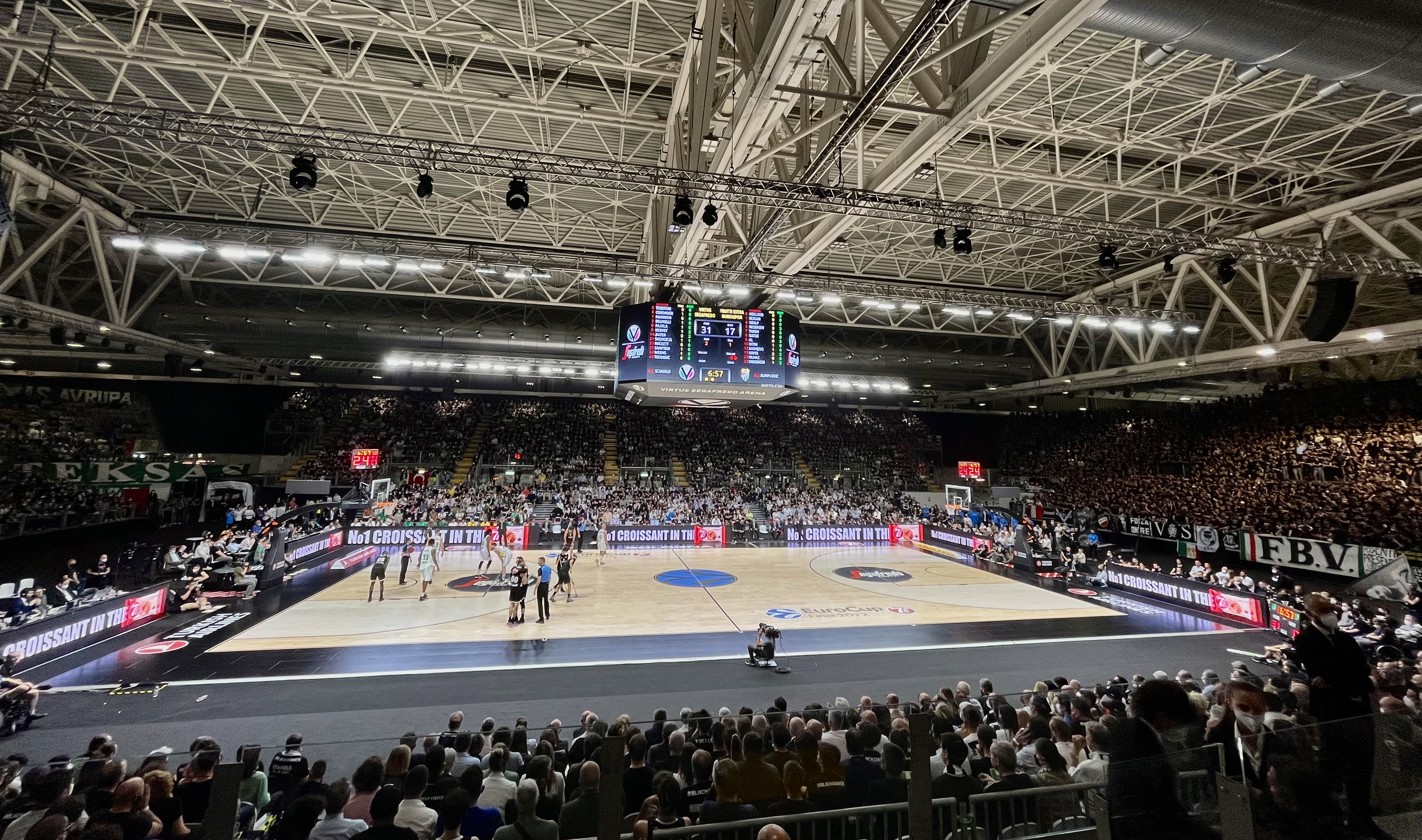
Virtus Segafredo Arena

Another popular sport in this region is basketball. Two teams from Emilia-Romagna currently compete in the Lega Basket Serie A: Virtus Bologna, which with 16 scudetti, 2 Euroleague championships and 8 Coppe Italia is one of the most important teams in Europe, and Reggiana from Reggio Emilia. Fortitudo Bologna, which has also won two scudetti, Cento, Forlì and U.C.C. Piacenza compete in Serie A2, the second tier of the Italian basketball league pyramid.

The region has a very strong tradition in volleyball as well, with three clubs that are among the oldest, most winning and prestigious teams in Italy and Europe: Parma, Modena and Porto Ravenna. These three clubs have won a combined 9 CEV Champions Leagues, 4 won by Modena, 3 by Ravenna and 2 by Parma.

Panthers Parma are one of four American football teams that have participated in every edition of the Italian Football League.

Zebre compete professionally in the United Rugby Championship, the combined Irish, Italian, Scottish, South African and Welsh rugby union league. The club's home ground, the Stadio Sergio Lanfranchi, is located in Parma. Included in the table below are all sides in the top two tiers of Italian rugby.

Club	Town	Current division
Zebre	Parma	URC
Colorno	Colorno	Top10
Lyons	Piacenza	Top10
Valorugby Emilia	Reggio Emilia	Top10
Noceto	Noceto	Serie A
Parma	Parma	Serie A

== Transport ==
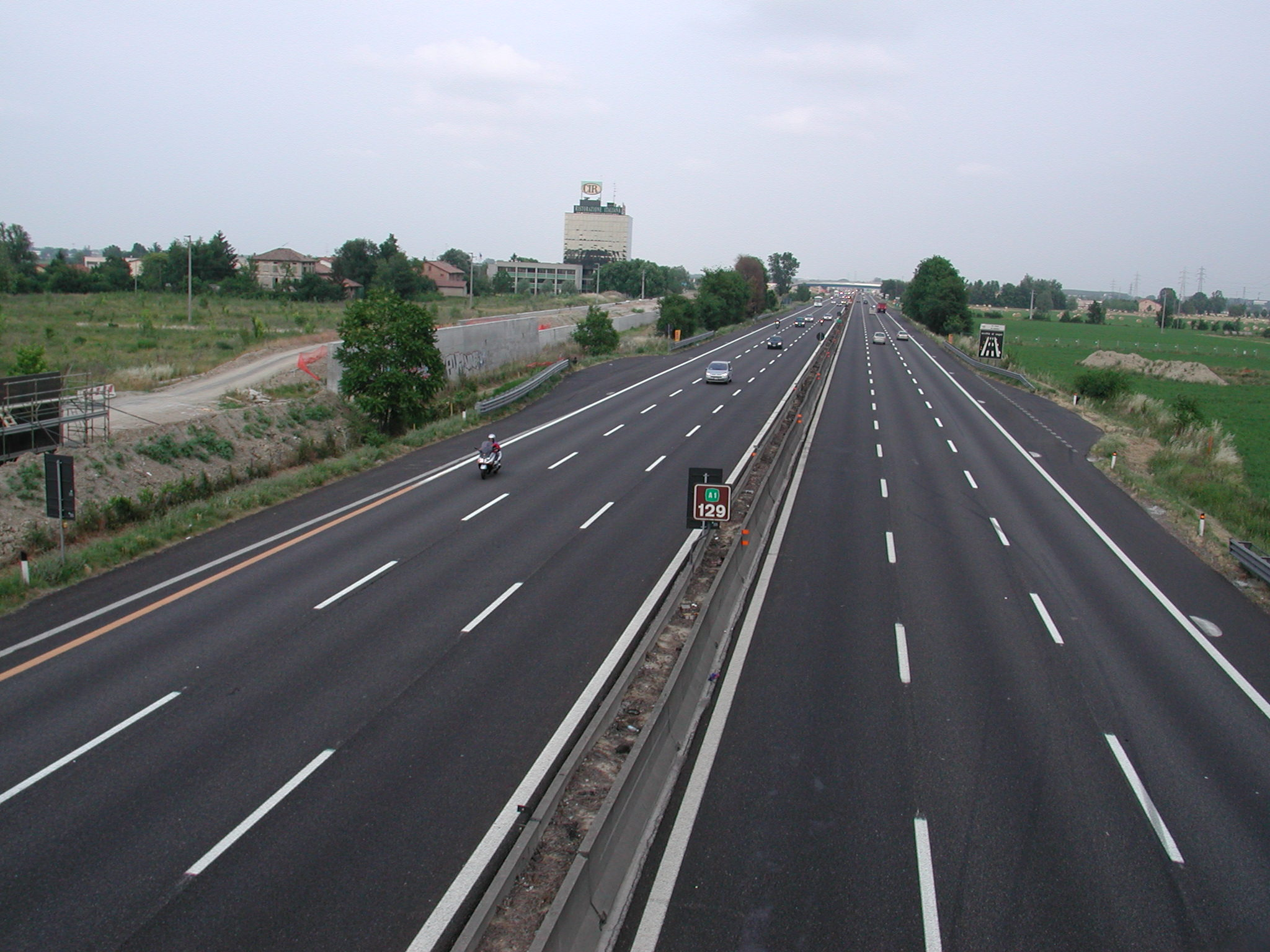
Autostrada A1 at Reggio Emilia

The transport infrastructure system of Emilia-Romagna consists of railways, airports, motorways, roads, maritime and river lines. The region of Emilia-Romagna has a very good system of transport, with 574 km (357 mi) of motorways, 1,053 km (654 mi) of railways and airports in Bologna, Forlì, Parma and Rimini. The main motorway crosses the region from north-west (Piacenza) to the south-east (Adriatic coast), connecting the main cities of Parma, Reggio Emilia, Modena, Bologna, and from here further to Ravenna, Rimini and the Adriatic coast. The region is the most important commercial strategic point of the country: Bologna is a railway hub of primary importance in the North and its freight station is the largest in Italy in terms of traffic volume. Some of the main motorways of the country converge in Emilia (Autostrada A1, Autostrada A13, Autostrada A14, Autostrada A15, Autostrada A21 e Autostrada A22). The port of Ravenna is the largest in the region, and with 26,256,248 tons of freight traffic in 2019, it is the sixth port in Italy in terms of goods flow and the second in the Adriatic Sea after the port of Trieste.

== See also ==
- Emilian-Romagnol language
- List of European regions by GDP
- Emilia-Romagna luthiers
