= SACMI =

Multinational manufacturing group

- Founded: 1919
- Founders: Luigi Santandrea; Filiberto Gamberini; Tiepolo Castaldi; Paolo Nonni; Giovanni Bartoli; Guido Selvatici; Vincenzo Franceschelli; Aldo Galassi; Armando Panari
- Headquarters: Imola, Italy
- Area served: Worldwide
- Website: www.sacmi.com/en-us/

SACMI (Società Anonima Cooperativa Meccanici Imola) is a multinational group manufacturing machines and complete plants for the ceramics, plastics, food and beverage, metals, packaging and advanced materials industries. The group is headquartered in Imola, Italy. SACMI has international branches in 28 countries, including Brazil, Germany, India, Mexico, Russia, Singapore, Spain, the United States, Indonesia, Poland, Portugal and Egypt. The company is a cooperative and was founded in 1919.

In 2024, SACMI achieved a turnover of 1.728 billion euros, with over 4,700 employees, 70 production, distribution and service companies in 25 countries worldwide.

== History ==
Nine unemployed men from Imola founded the cooperative in 1919. The founders were Luigi Santandrea, Filiberto Gamberini, Tiepolo Castaldi, Paolo Nonni, Giovanni Bartoli, Guido Selvatici, Vincenzo Franceschelli, Aldo Galassi, and Armando Panari. Panari was from Mordano, the others were from Imola. They founded the Società Anonima Cooperativa Meccanici Imola which forms the acronym SACMI. It began activity as a mechanical workshop engaged in general construction and repair. Its first administrator was a former mayor of Imola. Its headquarters were in premises donated by the town council.

In the 1920s, SACMI was the target of arson perpetrated by the Blackshirts, who considered it as a "dangerous nest of the anti-Fascists".

During the German occupation that began on 8 September 1943, the company dismantled its machinery and removed it to the rural areas so as not to be shipped to Germany by the occupying power. It restarted in 1945 and its first project was repair to the tile making presses of the Cooperative Ceramica a ceramic tile manufacturer in the vicinity, that had suffered damage in German air-raids. The company realised its ability to manufacture presses that were till then imported from Germany. This project was a turning point in the company's history. The company benefited from the post-war reconstruction efforts in Italy.

In 2003, SACMI acquired a 30 percent share in Riedhammer, Nuremberg. The company develops, distributes, and produces high-temperature kilns for the industrial sector such as the ceramics industry, and is also active in the development of technologies for foam glass production and roller and rotary kilns for the lithium battery industry.

In 2004, the SACMI Group increased its stake in Riedhammer to 90 percent.

== See also ==
- List of Italian companies
