= List of municipalities of the Province of Rimini =

The following is a list of the 27 municipalities (comuni) of the Province of Rimini in the region of Emilia-Romagna in Italy.

== List ==
Municipality	Population (2026)	Area (km²)	Density
Bellaria-Igea Marina	19,562	18.17	1,076.6
Casteldelci	349	49.68	7.0
Cattolica	16,614	6.20	2,679.7
Coriano	10,487	46.77	224.2
Gemmano	1,156	18.85	61.3
Maiolo	783	24.28	32.2
Misano Adriatico	14,171	22.35	634.0
Mondaino	1,357	19.84	68.4
Montecopiolo	1,029	35.81	28.7
Montefiore Conca	2,312	22.32	103.6
Montegridolfo	1,025	6.94	147.7
Montescudo-Monte Colombo	7,004	32.35	216.5
Morciano di Romagna	7,282	5.44	1,338.6
Novafeltria	7,031	41.84	168.0
Pennabilli	2,692	69.80	38.6
Poggio Torriana	5,097	34.74	146.7
Riccione	34,367	17.50	1,963.8
Rimini	150,774	135.71	1,111.0
Saludecio	3,274	34.27	95.5
San Clemente	5,749	20.70	277.7
San Giovanni in Marignano	9,425	21.37	441.0
San Leo	2,877	53.14	54.1
Sant'Agata Feltria	1,957	79.74	24.5
Santarcangelo di Romagna	22,366	45.01	496.9
Sassofeltrio	1,379	21.08	65.4
Talamello	1,081	10.59	102.1
Verucchio	10,044	27.30	367.9

== See also ==
- List of municipalities of Emilia-Romagna
- List of municipalities of Italy
