= Formaggio di fossa =

Italian cheese

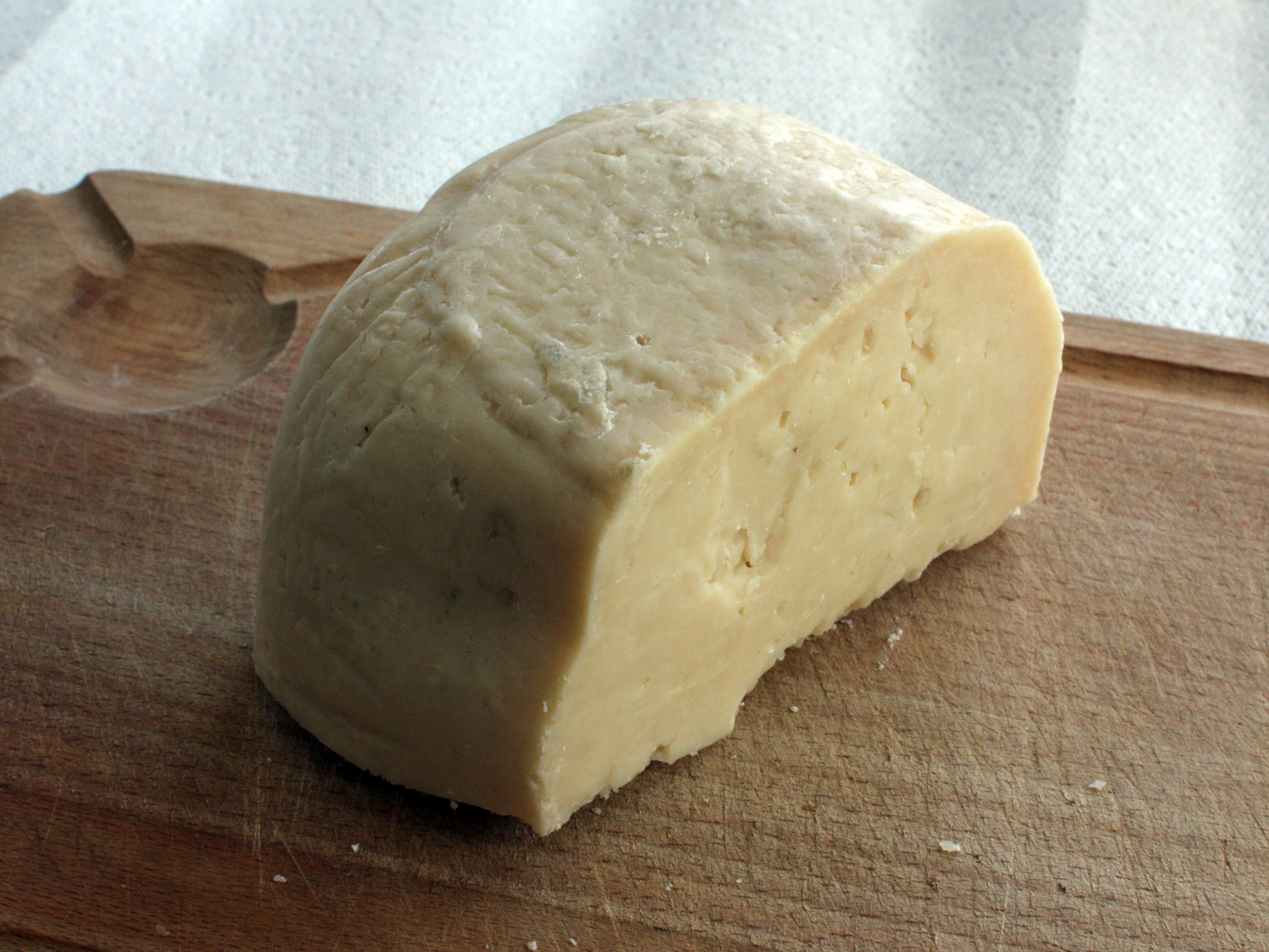
- Country of origin: Italy
- Region: Emilia-Romagna
- Town: Sogliano al Rubicone; Talamello; Perticara
- Source of milk: Cow, sheep, goat, or mixed
- Aging time: 30 days prior to being placed in a pit (fossa), plus 80–100 days inside the fossa, plus 3 months after removal from the fossa
- Certification: DOP

Formaggio di fossa (lit. 'pit cheese') is an Italian cheese originating from Sogliano al Rubicone, in the province of Forlì-Cesena, Emilia-Romagna.

Fossa's production process dates to the 14th century. The cheese matures in pits dug in tufa, where it matures for three months. As well as Sogliano, the cheese is produced in Talamello, where it is known as Ambra di Talamello, and Perticara, a frazione (hamlet) of Novafeltria, both in the province of Rimini.

In November 2009, fossa received denominazione di origine protetta (DOP) status. In 2017, it was estimated that about 112,000 kilograms (247,000 lb) of fossa is produced annually.

== History ==
Fossa's production dates to the 14th century. According to legend, the cheese was found by historical chance: it would be buried in tufa to protect it from raids, such as from Saracens or during the First Italian War. In these pits, the cheese would mature with other foods in a space characterised by a lack of air, enabling anaerobic fermentation. Traditionally, fossa would be buried in mid-to-late August and unearthed on Saint Catherine's Day (25 November), when it was said to be "resurrected".

The cheesemaking pits were also used as secret storerooms, hiding places for outlaws, and stockpile shelters to stabilise prices. The northern cheese producers emphasise that it would be hidden from tax collectors from the Papal States, while the southern cheese producers emphasise that it was a staple during sieges.

From the early 1980s, the cheese was popularised by Antonio Monti, mayor of Talamello, who came from Sogliano al Rubicone. In November 2009, fossa received denominazione di origine protetta (DOP) status. In 2017, it was estimated that about 112,000 kilograms (247,000 lb) of fossa is produced annually.

== Production process ==
=== Locations ===
Fossa's production is particularly associated with Sogliano, in the province of Forlì-Cesena. It is produced between the rivers Rubicon and Marecchia, between the historical regions of Romagna and Montefeltro. The tufa for the cheese is found in a triangle between Sogliano, Talamello, and Sant'Agata Feltria. In Talamello, fossa is known as Ambra di Talamello (lit. 'Amber of Talamello'); Tonino Guerra is crediting for giving the cheese its name.

On 25 August 2009, Novafeltria, Sant'Agata Feltria, and Talamello transferred from the province of Pesaro and Urbino in the Marche region to the province of Rimini in Emilia-Romagna, meaning that fossa is now produced only in Romagna, though it is often still listed as a formaggio marchigiano.

=== Process ===
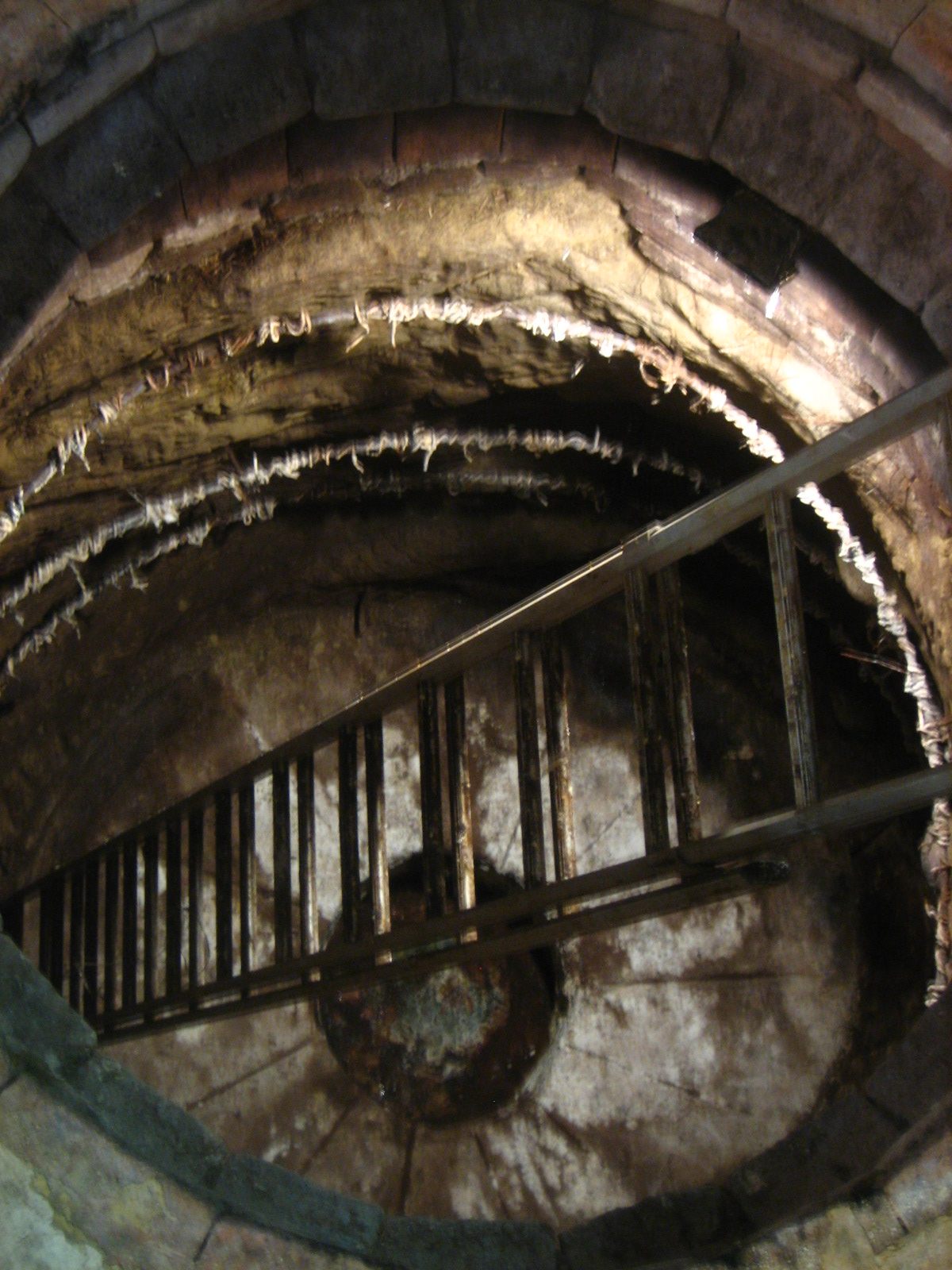
The cheese is buried in a pit (fossa), like the one in Sogliano al Rubicone, pictured here in May 2009.

Fossa is made from sheep's milk, cow's milk, a mixture of the two, or rarely buffalo milk. The milk typically dates to between April and May, when it is richer in aromas and substances. After maturing for twenty to thirty days, the cheese is placed in white cotton, linen, or canvas bags, with approximately ten wheels per bag, each marked with the name of its owner. Once the bagging is complete, the cheese can be placed in layers in the pits, traditionally in mid-to-late August.

The pits are typically flask-shaped, with a depth of 3 metres (9.8 ft) and a base of 2 metres (6.6 ft) in diameter. They must be at least ten years old to ensure that the right colonies of bacteria inhabit it.

Before their burial, large quantities of straw are burned in the pits to sanitise them and remove their humidity. The walls are then covered with dry straw, supported by reeds, and wooden planks are placed at the bottom of the pit. The placement of the bags attempts to minimise the amount of air between bags.

Once the cheese is placed inside, the pits are sealed with plaster, wood, and sand. The cheese matures for between 80 and 100 days, during which time it softens and loses some of its lactose, water, and fat, leading to its distinctive sharp flavour. The lack of air enables anaerobic fermentation.

In Sogliano, the cheese is unearthed on Saint Catherine's Day; the unearthing is a notable local event, with cultural fairs on Sundays in November. In Perticara, a frazione (hamlet) of Novafeltria, the cheese is unearthed on Saint Martin's Day (11 November). A chisel and mallet are used to uncover the lid so that it can be opened. Some fossa is produced in the spring, with discernible differences in taste.

== Presentation ==
Fossa looks dirty white in colour. It has almost no rind, facilitating the formation of mould on its surface. Fossa has a strong and aromatic taste, which is decidedly herbaceous, recalling the straw in the pit. The taste is initially sweet and delicate, and intensifies in spice, and sometimes bitterness. The higher the cheese was placed in the pit, the creamier it is.

Ambra di Talamello is sweeter than Fossa di Sogliano. Ambra is made with sheep's milk, goat's milk, or a mixture of the two, which is produced in Tuscany. As the name implies, Ambra's colour extends to amber or light gold, and its taste has scents of mushroom and steamed chestnut. Fossa from Perticara is even sweeter than Ambra di Talamello.

Pecorino matured in the pits has hints of mould and truffle, with an almost rectangular appearance. It is often vacuum-packed to preserve its freshness.

Once opened, fossa is best preserved wrapped in a cotton cloth and refrigerated. It is best served at room temperature, and can be eaten as an appetiser or dessert accompanied by acacia or chestnut honey, caramelised figs, fresh fruit, or fruit jams. Fossa can also be used to make ravioli, risotto, gnocchi, passatelli, or cappelletti. Alternatively, it can be grated onto pasta. It pairs well with local wines, such as Sangiovese di Romagna, or Valpolicella wines.

== See also ==
- List of Italian cheeses
