= Montescudo =

Town in Emilia-Romagna, Italy

- Comune
- Comune di Montescudo
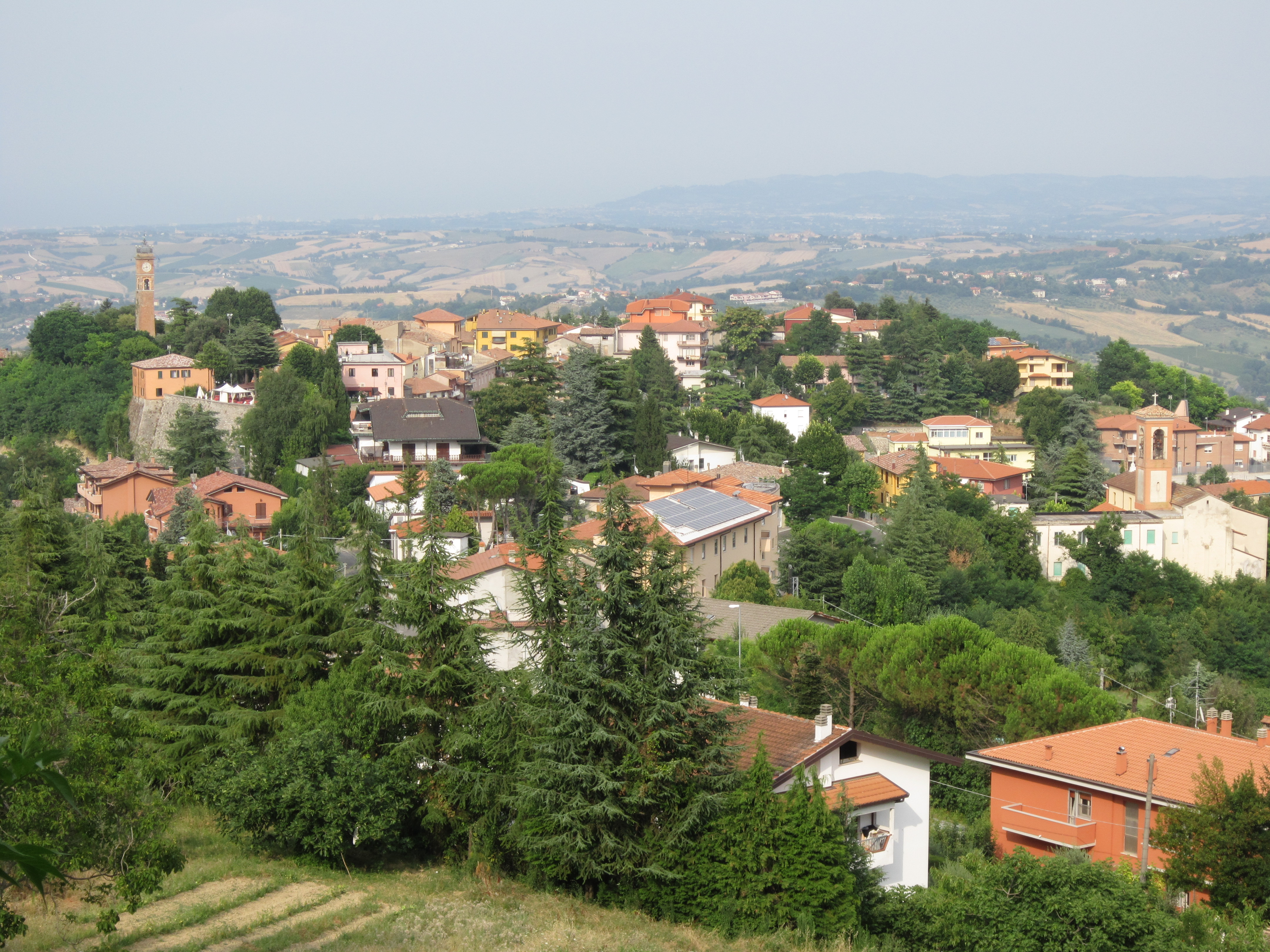

- Coat of arms

- Location within Italy Location within Emilia-Romagna
- Coordinates: 43°55′N 12°33′E
- Country: Italy
- Region: Emilia-Romagna
- Province: Rimini (RN)
- Frazioni: Albereto, Santa Maria del Piano, Trarivi

Government
  - Mayor: Andrea Pula

Area
  - Total: 19.9 km^{2} (7.7 sq mi)
- Elevation: 386 m (1,266 ft)

Population (31 May 2007)
  - Total: 2,841
  - Density: 143/km^{2} (370/sq mi)
- Demonym: Montescudesi
- Time zone: UTC+1 (CET)
  - Summer (DST): UTC+2 (CEST)
- Postal code: 47040
- Dialing code: 0541
- Patron saint: St. Sebastian
- Saint day: January 20
- Website: Official website

Montescudo is a frazione and former comune (municipality) in the Province of Rimini in the Italian region Emilia-Romagna, located about 120 kilometres (75 mi) southeast of Bologna and about 15 kilometres (9 mi) south of Rimini.

Montescudo borders the following municipalities: Coriano, Faetano (San Marino), Gemmano, Monte Colombo, Sassofeltrio.

== History ==
Montescudo is most likely of Etruscan origin. Likely from Italian monte ("mountain") + scudo ("shield"), thus ("shield mountain"). In the Roman era it was a station of the military mail service from Rimini to Rome. In 1209 it was conquered by Emperor Otto I, and later was under the Republic of Venice. In the late Middle Ages, through a series of bloody struggles, it was contended by the House of Malatesta of Rimini and by the Dukes of Urbino. In 1509 it was ceded by the Republic of Venice to the Papal States.

Montescudo was historically part of a district area whose capital was Coriano. During the Cisalpine Republic and Italian Republic, the district capital moved to Montescudo. The return of the Papal States in 1805 restored Coriano's place.

The town was effectively razed during an engagement on the Gothic Line in the Second World War. 576 Allied soldiers were buried in Montescudo, but were reinterred in the newly-built Coriano Ridge War Cemetery shortly afterwards due to the soil's subsistence in Montescudo.

On 1 January 1996, Montescudo joined the municipalities of Gemmano, Montefiore Conca, Saludecio, Mondaino, Montegridolfo, Monte Colombo, San Clemente, and Morciano di Romagna formed the Valconca Union. The union was formed to integrate public services across the municipalities. A clause working towards the comuni's merger was repealed in 2009.

On 1 January 2016, the municipalities of Montescudo and Monte Colombo merged to form the municipality of Montescudo-Monte Colombo.

== Main sights ==
- Civic Tower (14th century)
- Remains of the walls erected by Sigismondo Pandolfo Malatesta, as well as of a Rocca Malatestiana (castle).
- The Ghiacciaia, an ice reservoir dating from the Malatestian era.
- Remains of the 15th century church of Santa Maria Succurrente, in the frazione of Valliano.
