= Montefeltro =

Historical and geographical region in Central Italy

Map of the region before 2021 municipal transfers

Montefeltro is a historical and geographical region in Central Italy. It gave its name to the Montefeltro family, who ruled in the area during the Middle Ages and the Renaissance.

The mountainous region includes San Marino and the upper valleys of the rivers Marecchia and Conca. It is situated at the borders of the Italian regions of Emilia-Romagna, the Marche, and Tuscany.

The region has been historically considered an extension of Romagna.

== Overview ==
Montefeltro covers mostly the mountain part of the province of Pesaro and Urbino (Marche) and the south-western area of the province of Rimini (Emilia-Romagna). It comprises also two municipalities of the province of Arezzo, Tuscany, and the Republic of San Marino. The most important town of the region is Novafeltria. Today it is part of the Roman Catholic Diocese of San Marino-Montefeltro, formerly until 1978 the Roman Catholic Diocese of Montefeltro.

The area is subject to recent territorial changes between the province of Pesaro and Urbino and the Province of Rimini. On 15 August 2009, seven municipalities were transferred from Pesaro and Urbino to Rimini: Casteldelci, Maiolo, Novafeltria, Pennabilli, San Leo, Sant'Agata Feltria and Talamello. On 17 June 2021, the municipalities of Montecopiolo and Sassofeltrio followed.

== History ==
In the late 19th century, the area became a stronghold for republicans and supporters of Giuseppe Garibaldi, leading to considerable social repression.

In the 1960s, much of Montefeltro was depopulated as Rimini's mass tourism economy developed.

== Municipalities ==
Comune	Area (km^{2})	Population	Mountain Community	Province	Region	Country
Badia Tedalda	119.12	1,165	none	Arezzo	Tuscany	Italy
Belforte all'Isauro	11.99	796	Montefeltro	Pesaro e Urbino	Marche	Italy
Carpegna	28.31	1,680	Montefeltro	Pesaro e Urbino	Marche	Italy
Casteldelci	49.21	476	Alta Valmarecchia	Rimini	Emilia-Romagna	Italy
Frontino	10.74	317	Montefeltro	Pesaro e Urbino	Marche	Italy
Lunano	14.62	1,453	Montefeltro	Pesaro e Urbino	Marche	Italy
Macerata Feltria	40.23	2,128	Montefeltro	Pesaro e Urbino	Marche	Italy
Maiolo	24.40	841	Alta Valmarecchia	Rimini	Emilia-Romagna	Italy
Mercatino Conca	14.47	1,112	Montefeltro	Pesaro e Urbino	Marche	Italy
Monte Cerignone	18.04	672	Montefeltro	Pesaro e Urbino	Marche	Italy
Montecopiolo	35.74	1,235	Montefeltro	Rimini	Emilia-Romagna	Italy
Monte Grimano	52.31	1,249	Montefeltro	Pesaro e Urbino	Marche	Italy
Novafeltria	41.78	7,312	Alta Valmarecchia	Rimini	Emilia-Romagna	Italy
Pennabilli	69.66	3,098	Alta Valmarecchia	Rimini	Emilia-Romagna	Italy
Piandimeleto	39.96	2,096	Montefeltro	Pesaro e Urbino	Marche	Italy
Pietrarubbia	13.05	709	Montefeltro	Pesaro e Urbino	Marche	Italy
San Leo	53.32	3,041	Alta Valmarecchia	Rimini	Emilia-Romagna	Italy
San Marino (List of 9 municipalities)	60.57	31,269				San Marino
Sant'Agata Feltria	79.30	2,316	Alta Valmarecchia	Rimini	Emilia-Romagna	Italy
Sassocorvaro Auditore	87.55	4888	Montefeltro	Pesaro e Urbino	Marche	Italy
Sassofeltrio	20.87	1,392	Montefeltro	Rimini	Emilia-Romagna	Italy
Sestino	80.46	1,485	none	Arezzo	Tuscany	Italy
Talamello	10.53	1,117	Alta Valmarecchia	Rimini	Emilia-Romagna	Italy
Tavoleto	11.99	909	Montefeltro	Pesaro e Urbino	Marche	Italy
Montefeltro	987.49	73,031				

== See also ==
- House of Montefeltro
- Roman Catholic Diocese of San Marino-Montefeltro
