= Pietracuta =

Village in Emilia-Romagna, Italy

- Frazione
- Location in Emilia-Romagna, Italy Pietracuta (Italy)
- Coordinates: 43.8972°N 12.3444°E
- Country: Italy
- Region: Emilia-Romagna
- Province: Rimini
- Comune: San Leo
- Time zone: UTC+1 (CET)

Pietracuta is a village (frazione) of the comune of San Leo in the Province of Rimini, Emilia-Romagna, Italy. It contains the ruins of the mediaeval Castello di Pietracuta.
