= Monte Colombo =

Town in Emilia-Romagna, Italy

- Comune
- Comune di Monte Colombo
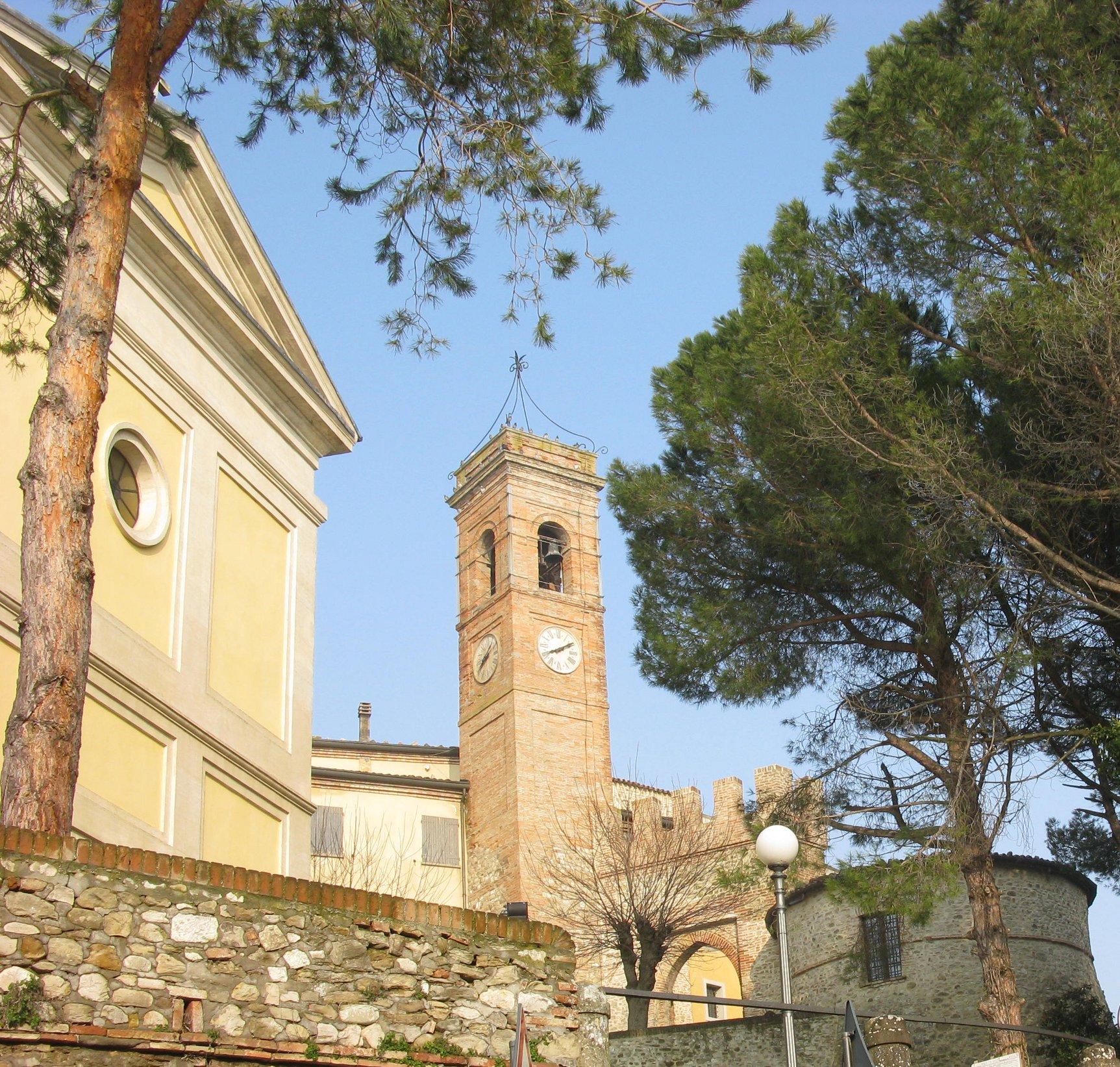

- Coat of arms

- Location within Italy Location within Emilia-Romagna
- Coordinates: 43°55′N 12°33′E
- Country: Italy
- Region: Emilia-Romagna
- Province: Rimini (RN)
- Frazioni: Taverna, Croce, San Savino, Osteria Nuova

Government
  - Mayor: Simone Tordi

Area
  - Total: 11.9 km^{2} (4.6 sq mi)
- Elevation: 315 m (1,033 ft)

Population (2010)
  - Total: 3,143
  - Density: 264/km^{2} (684/sq mi)
- Demonym: Montecolombesi
- Time zone: UTC+1 (CET)
  - Summer (DST): UTC+2 (CEST)
- Postal code: 47040
- Dialing code: 0541
- Patron saint: St. Martin of Tours
- Saint day: November 11

Monte Colombo is a frazione and former comune (municipality) in the Province of Rimini in the Italian region Emilia-Romagna, located about 120 kilometres (75 mi) southeast of Bologna and about 15 kilometres (9 mi) south of Rimini.

Monte Colombo borders the following municipalities: Coriano, Gemmano, Montescudo, and San Clemente.

== History ==
Although the area housed some residences and scattered settlements in the Roman and Byzantine Ages, the current town originated in the Middle Ages from a castle built here by the Malatesta family. After the latter's fall and a short period under Cesare Borgia, Monte Colombo was acquired by the Republic of Venice, which however ceded it to the Papal States in 1509–10.

On 1 January 2016, the municipalities of Monte Colombo and Montescudo merged to form the new municipality of Montescudo-Monte Colombo.

== Main sights ==
- Malatesta castle, with the annexed burg (14th century)
- Castle (fortified burg) of San Savino, dating to the late 15th century
- Bridge over the Rio Calamino (18th century)
