= Morciano di Romagna =

- Comune
- Comune di Morciano di Romagna Valconca
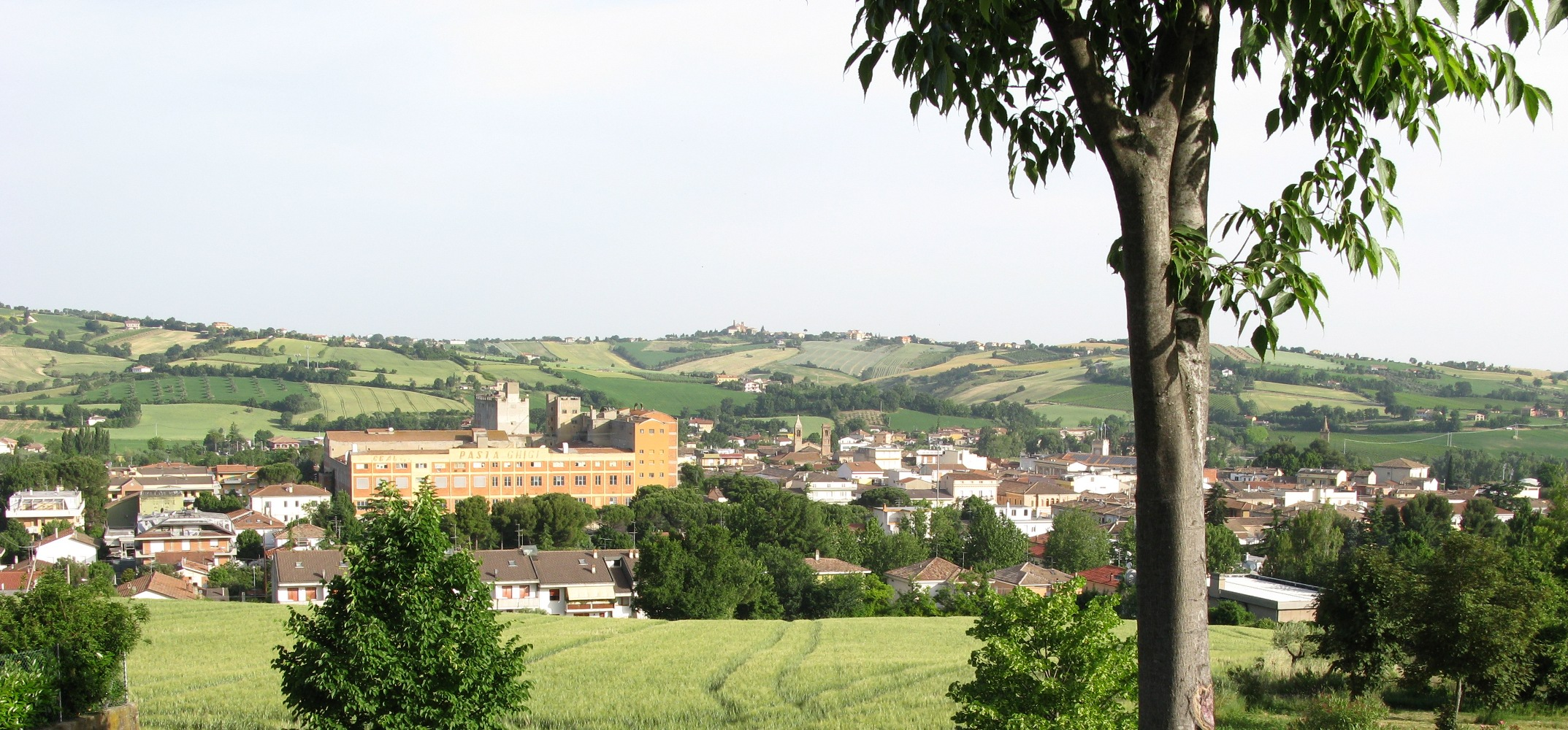

- Flag Coat of arms

- Location within Italy Location within Emilia-Romagna
- Coordinates: 43°55′N 12°39′E
- Country: Italy
- Region: Emilia-Romagna
- Province: Rimini (RN)

Government
  - Mayor: Giorgio Ciotti

Area
  - Total: 5.44 km^{2} (2.10 sq mi)
- Elevation: 82 m (269 ft)

Population (31 October 2020)
  - Total: 7,161
  - Density: 1,320/km^{2} (3,410/sq mi)
- Demonym: Morcianesi
- Time zone: UTC+1 (CET)
  - Summer (DST): UTC+2 (CEST)
- Postal code: 47833
- Dialing code: 0541
- Patron saint: St. Michael Archangel
- Saint day: September 29
- Website: Official website

Morciano di Romagna (Romagnol: Murzèn or Murcièn) is a comune (municipality) in the Province of Rimini in the Italian region Emilia-Romagna. It is about 120 kilometres (75 mi) southeast of Bologna and about 15 kilometres (9 mi) southeast of Rimini. The Conca flows past the town.

== History ==
Since the Middle Ages, Morciano di Romagna has been the market town for the Conca valley. Despite its local importance, it was politically subordinate to Coriano, and treated as an appodiato municipality: though it had administrative jurisdiction over its territory and could raise its own taxes, it was dependent on another municipality.

In 1816, Morciano numbered 1,000 inhabitants. In 1828, it was transferred from the municipality of Montefiore to the municipality of San Clemente. It gained municipal autonomy only in 1857, by the decree of Pope Pius IX. In 1861, it numbered 1,503 inhabitants.

After the Second World War, Morciano consolidated its position as the economic capital of the Conca valley, assisted by a small industrial area. It grew considerably during the 1950s and 1960s, numbering 4,806 residents in 1951 and 5,509 residents in 1971.

On 1 January 1996, Morciano joined Gemmano, Montefiore Conca, Saludecio, Mondaino, Montegridolfo, Montescudo, Monte Colombo, San Clemente, to form the Valconca Union, which aims to integrate public services across the municipalities. A clause working towards the comuni's merger was repealed in 2009.
