= San Giovanni in Marignano =

- Comune
- Comune di San Giovanni in Marignano
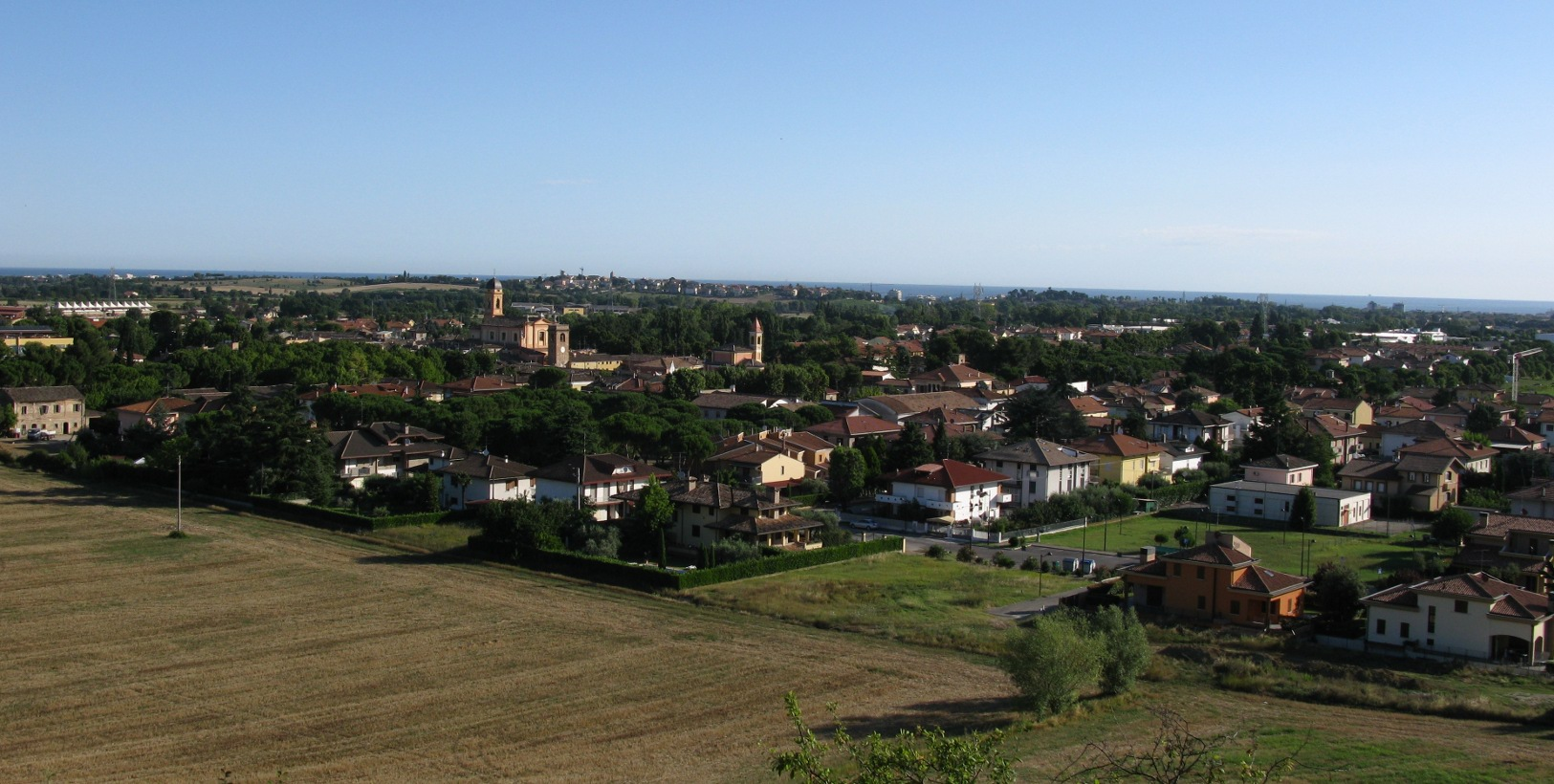

- Coat of arms

- Location within Italy Location within Emilia-Romagna
- Coordinates: 43°56′N 12°43′E
- Country: Italy
- Region: Emilia-Romagna
- Province: Rimini (RN)
- Frazioni: Santa Maria in Pietrafitta, Montalbano, Pianventena

Government
  - Mayor: Michela Bertuccioli

Area
  - Total: 21.37 km^{2} (8.25 sq mi)
- Elevation: 30 m (98 ft)

Population (31 October 2020)
  - Total: 9,453
  - Density: 442.3/km^{2} (1,146/sq mi)
- Demonym: Marignanesi
- Time zone: UTC+1 (CET)
  - Summer (DST): UTC+2 (CEST)
- Postal code: 47842
- Dialing code: 0541
- Patron saint: St. Lucy
- Saint day: December 13
- Website: Official website

San Giovanni in Marignano (Romagnol: San Giàn or San Zvan in Marignèn) is a comune (municipality) in the Province of Rimini in the Italian region Emilia-Romagna, located about 130 kilometres (81 mi) southeast of Bologna and about 20 kilometres (12 mi) southeast of Rimini. As of 2021, the municipality counts 9,463 inhabitants.

San Giovanni in Marignano borders the following municipalities: Cattolica, Gradara, Misano Adriatico, Morciano di Romagna, Saludecio, San Clemente, Tavullia. It is one of I Borghi più belli d'Italia ("The most beautiful villages of Italy"). Cattolica Airfield is an abandoned World War II US Air Force airfield in its vicinity.

== History ==
Under the Kingdom of Italy, on 5 December 1895, Cattolica gained municipal autonomy from San Giovanni.

In 1951, 54% of San Giovanni's population was employed in agriculture, falling to 23% by 1971.
