= Grossi Gang =

The Grossi Gang was a group of Italian outlaws operating in northern Marche (a central area in Italy) between 1861 and 1862. The gang derived its name from that of its leader, Terenzio Grossi. Known as one of the few outbursts of organized rebellion against the unification process of Italy that was taking place in the Marche region, the Grossi gang was feared for a string of murders, robberies and thefts spread all along the Montefeltro and Val Metauro area.

== Criminal activity ==
The criminal activity of the Grossi gang can be traced back to the rebellion and opposition to the Italian unification process that began in mid '800 and the new laws and taxes that came with it, most notably the much-hated mandatory draft by the army. Social and political ideals including the associated violent rebellion by the hands of Gang's members were often mixed with common crime and delinquency, most of the time against State Properties.

The gang was notoriously in favor of the Pope and the Papal State, probably because of the support it received either from the Vatican City itself in the armed resistance against the newly formed Piedmont state and from the Marche area population, which was increasingly angered and restless in front of Piedmontese occupation. Tension took to even higher levels because of the enforcement of a mandatory draft by the army, fostering pro-resistance movements willing to help outlaw gangs like the Grossi's.

Traces of collaboration between the Vatican City and the Grossi Gang come to light in different moments of the Gang's life, as testified for example by the Vatican passport found in Terenzio Grossi's coat the moment his corpse was found.

== Gang members ==
Even though the actual number of gang members varied from time to time, those who were steadily involved included:

- Terenzio Grossi
- Sante Frontini, A.K.A. the Unforgiven
- Luigi Trebbi, A.K.A. Cacabasso
- Gaetano Gerboni
- Olinto Venturi, A.K.A. Zinzìn
- Biagio Olmeda, A.K.A. the Smart
- Pietro Pandolfi, A.K.A. the Wretch
- Giuseppe Alunni, A.K.A. the Greedy
- Marco Grossi
- Giovanni Battelli

== The trial ==
The trial of the Grossi Gang members took place from 8 June 1864, to 25 June in San Giovanni Church, Pesaro. The trial immediately became a mass event with thousands of viewers from the most diverse classes. During the trial, 210 witnesses were heard and a total of 475 indictments were issued. Among those, apart from default indictments against private property, were the murders of Carabinieri Filippo Chiuminato, Giuseppe Dini, Carlo Viggè, and Giuseppe Racchini.

At the trial, questions were raised regarding the corruption of Sante Frontini in order to betray Terenzio Grossi by the hand of Pesaro head of Carabinieri Cav. Bardesono and Royal Carabinieri mr. Procida. The Head Prosecutor said he was shocked by this corruption attempt, even though corrupting gang members in order to deliver to justice their leader was common practice at that time.

On 25 June 1864, sentences were delivered for gang members Gaetano Cerboni, Giuseppe Battelli, Pietro Pandolfi, Baldassarre Maccagli and Marco Grossi: life-time penal labour. Marco Grossi's sentence, who previously repented of his crimes, was reduced to 20 years.

Sante Frontini, who openly declared to be the murder of Terenzio Grossi was sentenced to death by beheading. The death sentence was executed in Pesaro later in October 1864.

== The Grossi Gang in popular culture and medias ==
- In May 2016, Cinestudio announced the start of production for a movie entitled The Grossi Gang – A true story, almost forgotten, written and directed by Claudio Ripalti. Film is slated to arrive in cinemas later in 2017.
- In 2010, illustrator and graphic novelist Michele Petrucci published a graphic novel on the story of the gang, il Brigante Grossi e la sua miserabile banda.

== See also ==
- Brigandage
