= Misano Adriatico =

- Comune
- Comune di Misano Adriatico
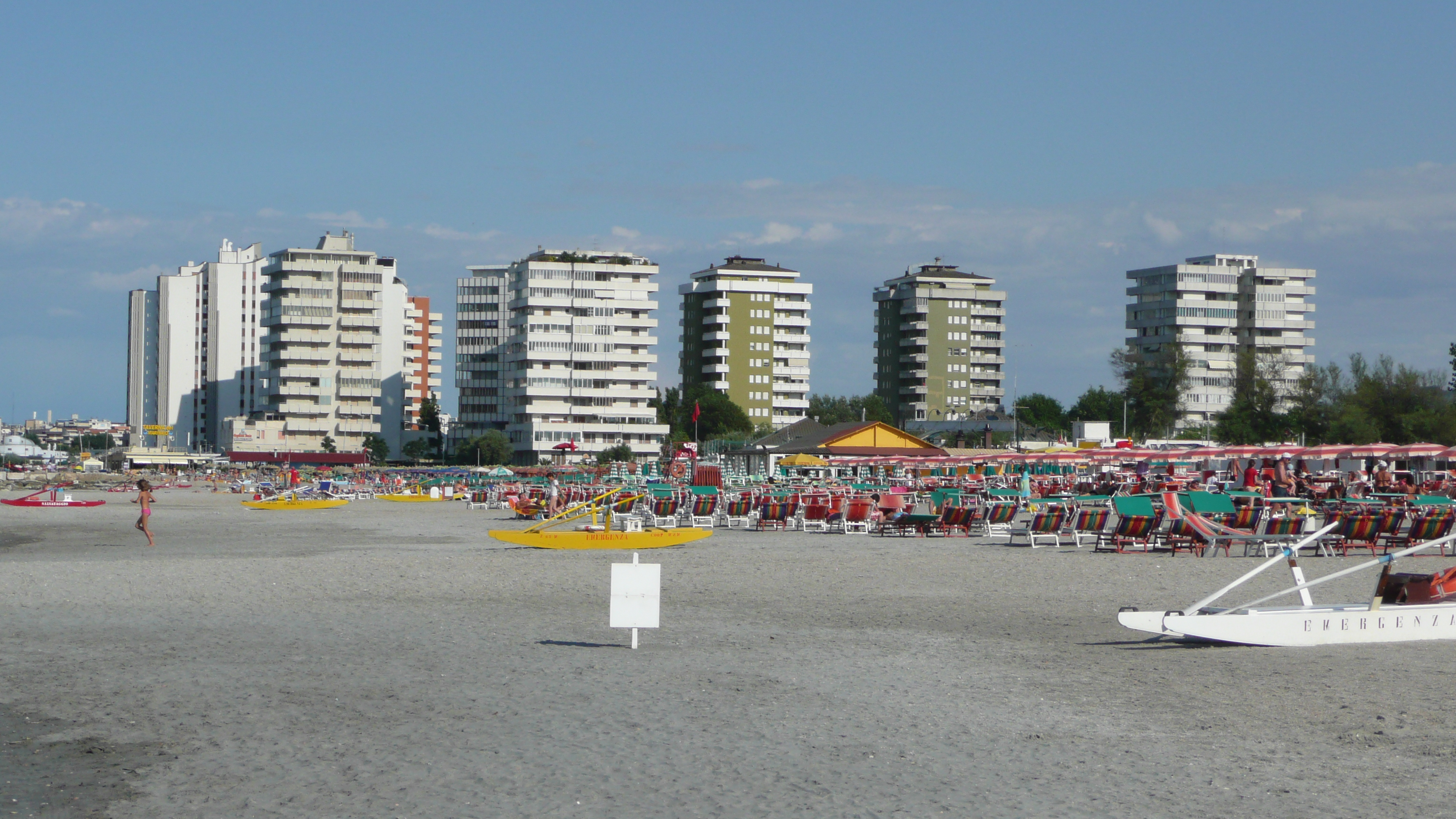
- View of Misano Adriatico

- Coat of arms

- Location within Italy Location within Emilia-Romagna
- Coordinates: 43°58′44″N 12°41′42″E
- Country: Italy
- Region: Emilia-Romagna
- Province: Rimini (RN)
- Frazioni: Belvedere, Canadà, Cà Silvagni, Cella Simbeni, La Cella, Le Casacce, Le Casette, Misano Brasile, Misano Centro, Misano Monte, Paraguay, Portoverde, Santamonica, Scacciano, Villaggio Argentina

Government
  - Mayor: Fabrizio Piccioni (Partito Democratico)

Area
  - Total: 22.43 km^{2} (8.66 sq mi)
- Elevation: 200 m (660 ft)

Population (January 2008)
  - Total: 11,485
  - Density: 512.0/km^{2} (1,326/sq mi)
- Demonym: Misanesi
- Time zone: UTC+1 (CET)
  - Summer (DST): UTC+2 (CEST)
- Postal code: 47843
- Dialing code: 0541
- Patron saint: St. Blaise
- Saint day: 3 February
- Website: Official website

Misano Adriatico (Romagnol: Misên) is a comune (municipality) in the Province of Rimini in the Italian region Emilia-Romagna, located about 120 kilometres (75 mi) southeast of Bologna and about 14 kilometres (9 mi) southeast of Rimini.

Misano Adriatico borders the following municipalities: Cattolica, Coriano, Riccione, San Clemente, San Giovanni in Marignano.

Misano is a seaside town with a few resorts. The main attraction of the town is the Misano World Circuit Marco Simoncelli. The Conca enters the Adriatic Sea near the town.

== History ==
When the Romans seized the territory, they linked the city of Rimini with the areas they had already conquered. There are traces of the establishments in the areas of Agina, Saint Monica, and Belvedere.

The first documented medieval settlement, Pieve of Saint Biagio or Saint Erasmo, was built in 997, it is one of the oldest constructions in the area. Around the Pieve arose a community that became Misano Monte. From 1295 to 1528, the village was under the domain of the Malatesta, who erected a castle. The entrance arch and part of the tower (reproduced in the crest) are all that remain today.

Later, due to the decline of the Malatesta dynasty, the village became part of the Papal State until the Unification of Italy. In 1511 it was recognized as an autonomous Municipality. The 500th anniversary of the foundation was celebrated in 2011.

After 1511, Misano lost administrative autonomy more than once for financial reasons. When that happened, Misano was annexed to one of the adjacent cities. In 1827, it regained autonomy permanently, detaching from San Giovanni in Marignano. They almost lost it again in 1935 to Cattolica, which requested the annexation for its own tourist development but the request was rejected, partially due to Benito Mussolini. In 1938 a regulation changed the name of the city from Misano to Villa Vittoria and eventually to its current name, Misano Adriatico.

The reconstruction of the city after World War II aimed at tourist development, and, in 1949, led to the transfer of the municipal office from Misano Monte to the coastline area, where it remains to this day.

A peculiarity of the area is the classification of the suburbs with the names of Latin American countries. This is due to the repatriation of the citizens who, in the 18th century, emigrated to these countries. They generated small communities in suburbs that are now important residential neighborhoods, such as Misano Brasile and Villaggio Argentina.

Since then, Misano has experienced considerable growth in population. Today, it is a prominent seaside resort in the area. The most notable structures are the tourist harbor of Portoverde (1963), the Misano World Circuit (1972), the stadium Santamonica (1993), and the renovated street furniture of via Repubblica (2000) and of the seashore (2004), done with the consultation of the architect Paolo Portoghesi. The main element of this street furniture is the sea, recalled in various representations through mosaics and fountains. In 2011, a new section of the street furniture of the seashore was inaugurated.
