= Maiolo =

- Comune
- Comune di Maiolo
- Location within Italy Location within Emilia-Romagna
- Coordinates: 43°52′N 12°19′E
- Country: Italy
- Region: Emilia-Romagna
- Province: Rimini (RN)
- Frazioni: Antico, Maioletto, Santa Maria

Area
  - Total: 24.4 km^{2} (9.4 sq mi)

Population (Dec. 2004)
  - Total: 807
  - Density: 33.1/km^{2} (85.7/sq mi)
- Time zone: UTC+1 (CET)
  - Summer (DST): UTC+2 (CEST)
- Postal code: 47862
- Dialing code: 0541

Maiolo (Romagnol: Maiul) is a comune (municipality) in the Province of Rimini in the Italian region Emilia-Romagna, located about 135 kilometres (84 mi) southeast of Bologna and about 35 kilometres (22 mi) south of Rimini. As of 31 December 2004, it had a population of 807 and an area of 24.4 square kilometres (9.4 mi^{2}).

== Geography ==
Maiolo borders the following municipalities: Montecopiolo, Novafeltria, Pennabilli, San Leo, Talamello.

== History ==
After the referendum of 17 and 18 December 2006, Maiolo was detached from the Province of Pesaro and Urbino (Marche) to join Emilia-Romagna and the province of Rimini on 15 August 2009.

== Demographic evolution ==
Historical population

Year	Pop.	±%
1861	1,062	—
1871	1,265	+19.1%
1881	1,383	+9.3%
1901	1,522	+10.1%
1911	1,678	+10.2%

Year	Pop.	±%
1921	1,737	+3.5%
1931	1,821	+4.8%
1936	1,791	−1.6%
1951	1,660	−7.3%
1961	1,197	−27.9%

Year	Pop.	±%
1971	874	−27.0%
1981	811	−7.2%
1991	802	−1.1%
2001	809	+0.9%

Source: Data from ISTAT
