= Montefiore Conca =

- Comune
- Comune di Montefiore Conca
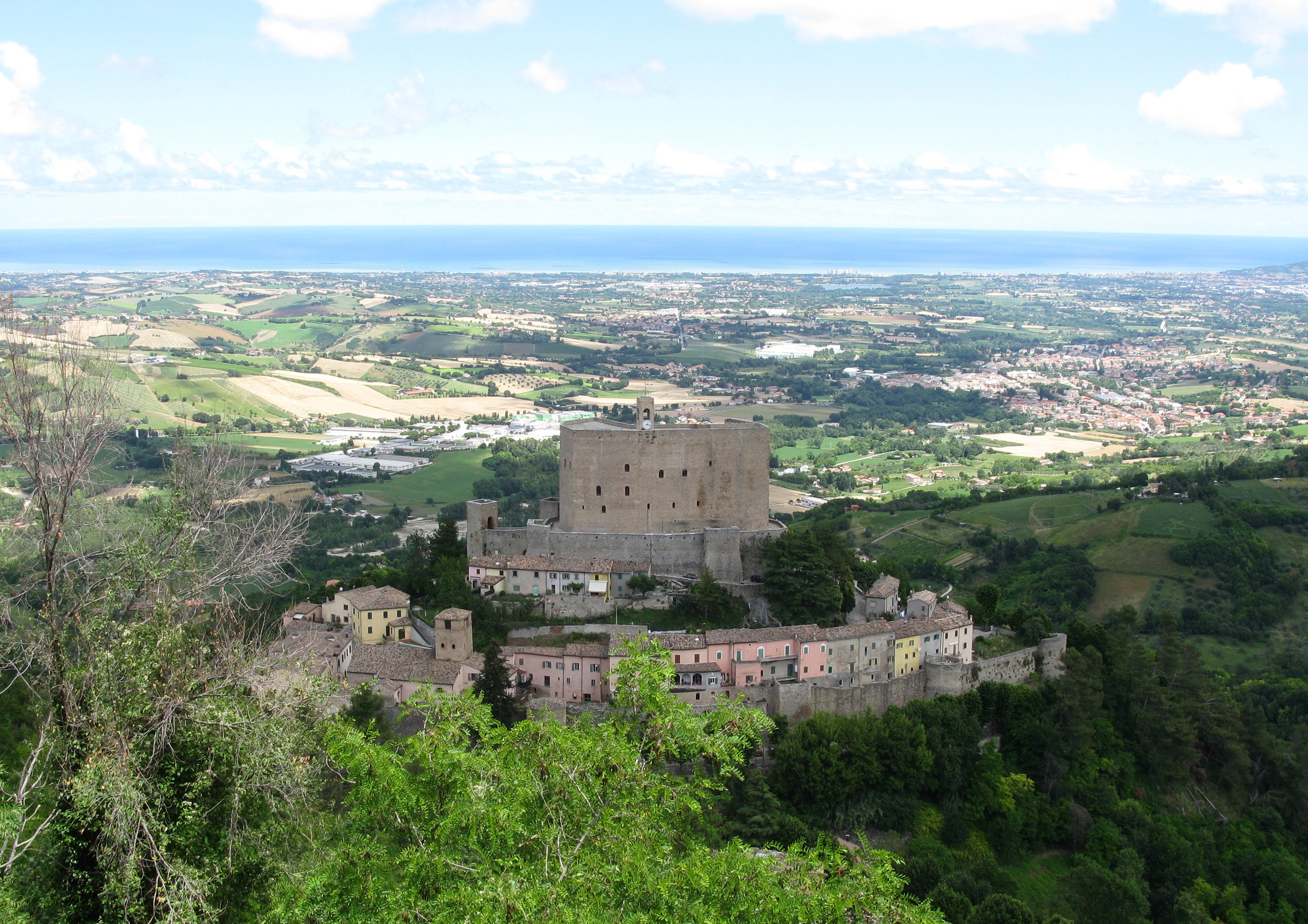

- Location within Italy Location within Emilia-Romagna
- Coordinates: 43°53′N 12°37′E
- Country: Italy
- Region: Emilia-Romagna
- Province: Rimini (RN)
- Frazioni: Borgo Pedrosa, La Falda, Levola, San Felice, San Gaudenzio, Serbadone, Serra di Sopra, Serra di Sotto

Government
  - Mayor: Filippo Sica

Area
  - Total: 22.32 km^{2} (8.62 sq mi)
- Elevation: 385 m (1,263 ft)

Population (31 October 2020)
  - Total: 2,217
  - Density: 99.33/km^{2} (257.3/sq mi)
- Demonym: Montefioresi
- Time zone: UTC+1 (CET)
  - Summer (DST): UTC+2 (CEST)
- Postal code: 47834
- Dialing code: 0541
- Website: Official website

Montefiore Conca (Romagnol: Munt Fior) is a comune (municipality) in the Province of Rimini in the Italian region Emilia-Romagna, located about 120 kilometres (75 mi) southeast of Bologna and about 20 kilometres (12 mi) south of Rimini.

Montefiore Conca borders the following municipalities: Gemmano, Mondaino, Morciano di Romagna, Saludecio, San Clemente, Sassocorvaro Auditore, Tavoleto. It is one of I Borghi più belli d'Italia ("The most beautiful villages of Italy").
