= Sogliano al Rubicone =

- Comune
- Comune di Sogliano al Rubicone
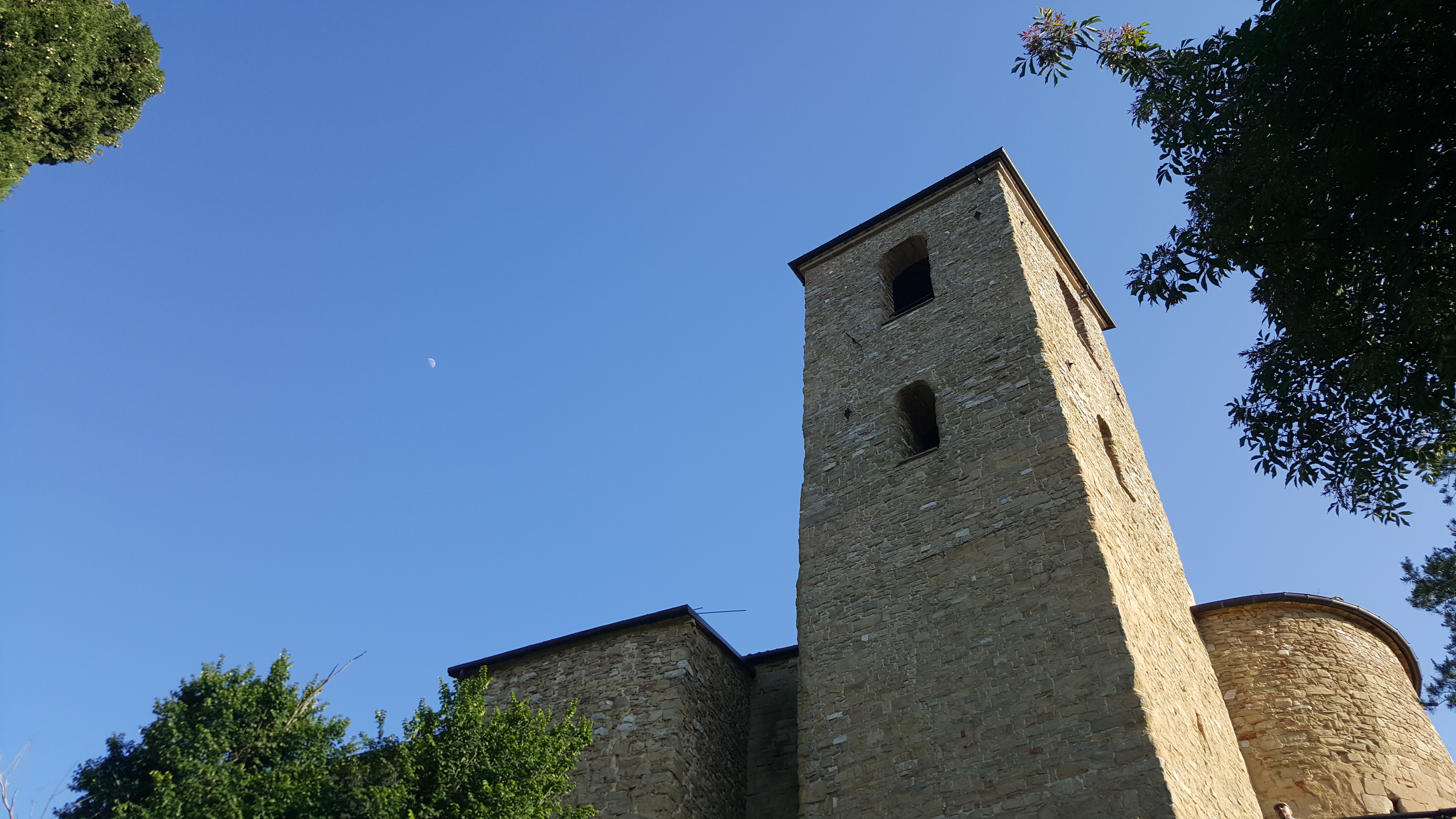
- View of Sogliano al Rubicone

- Location within Italy Location within Emilia-Romagna
- Coordinates: 44°0′N 12°18′E
- Country: Italy
- Region: Emilia-Romagna
- Province: Forlì-Cesena (FC)
- Frazioni: Bagnolo, Ginestreto, Massamanente, Montegelli, Montepetra, Montetiffi, Pietra dell'Uso, Rontagnano, San Paolo all'Uso, Santa Maria Riopetra, Savignano di Rigo, Strigara, Vignola

Government
  - Mayor: Tania Bocchini (Centre-left coalition)

Area
  - Total: 93.43 km^{2} (36.07 sq mi)
- Elevation: 362 m (1,188 ft)

Population (1 January 2017)
  - Total: 3,251
  - Density: 34.80/km^{2} (90.12/sq mi)
- Demonym: Soglianesi
- Time zone: UTC+1 (CET)
  - Summer (DST): UTC+2 (CEST)
- Postal code: 47030
- Dialing code: 0541
- Patron saint: St. Sebastian
- Saint day: 20 January
- Website: Official website

Sogliano al Rubicone (Romagnol: Sujén) is a comune (municipality) in the Province of Forlì-Cesena in the Italian region Emilia-Romagna, located about 90 kilometres (56 mi) southeast of Bologna and about 35 kilometres (22 mi) southeast of Forlì.

Sogliano al Rubicone is renowned for the Formaggio di Fossa cheese.

== History ==
After the development of economic autarky in 1935 under Fascist Italy, the town was prized for its deposits of lignite.

== Twin towns ==
- Meziboří, Czech Republic
- Sayda, Germany
