= Province of Rimini =

Province of Italy

Coordinates: 44°3′N 12°34′E

Province of Rimini Provincia di Rimini (Italian)
- Province
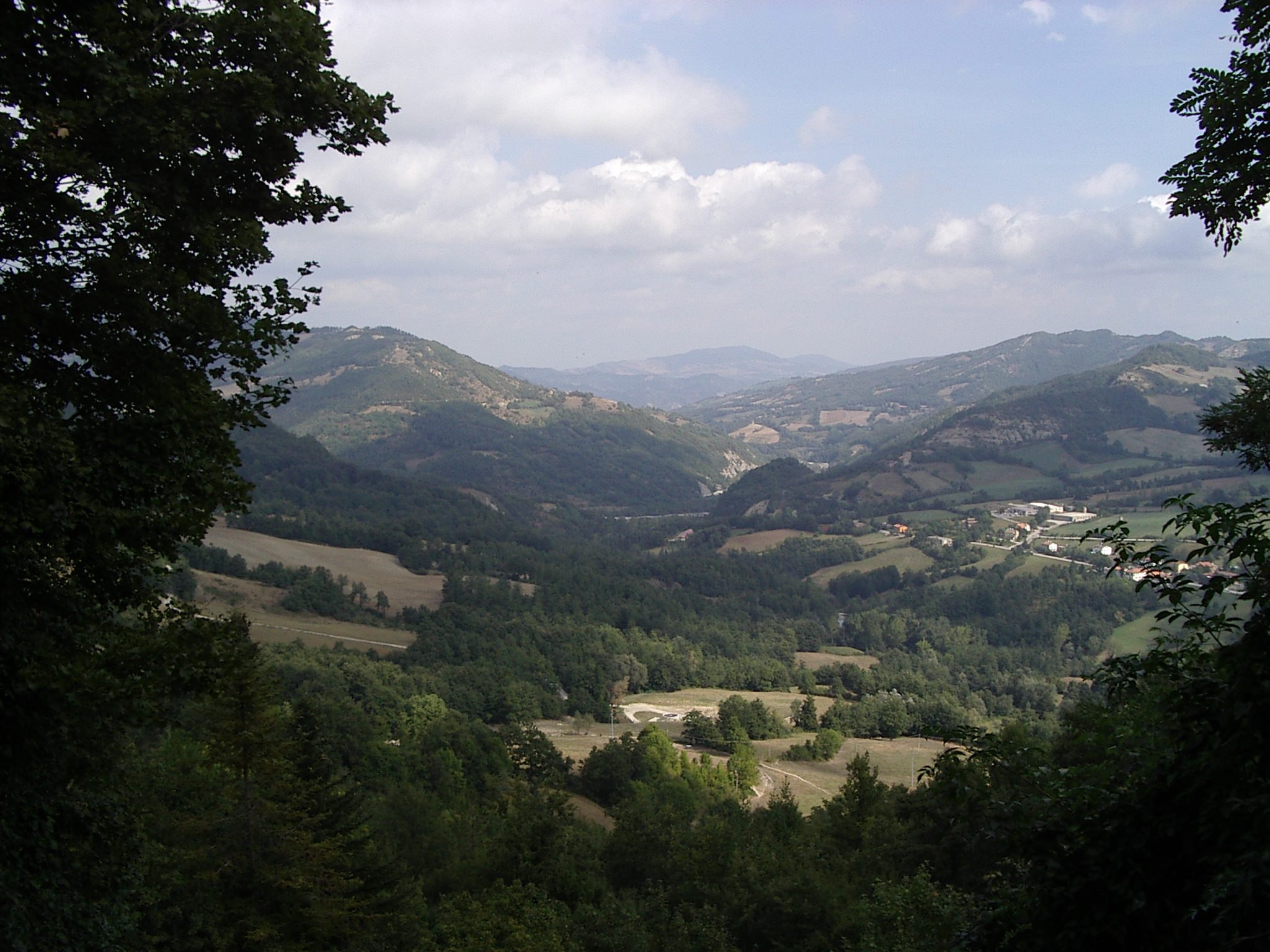
- Valmarecchia valley

- Flag Coat of arms

- Location of the province of Rimini in Italy
- Country: Italy
- Region: Emilia-Romagna
- Established: 16 April 1992
- Capital(s): Rimini
- Municipalities: 27

Government
  - President: Jamil Sadegholvaad

Area
  - Total: 921.77 km^{2} (355.90 sq mi)

Population (2026)
  - Total: 341,244
  - Density: 370.21/km^{2} (958.83/sq mi)

GDP
  - Total: €9.489 billion (2015)
  - Per capita: €28,297 (2015)
- Time zone: UTC+1 (CET)
  - Summer (DST): UTC+2 (CEST)
- Postal code: 47811–47814, 47821–47828, 47831–47838, 47841–47843, 47851–47855, 47900
- Telephone prefix: 0541, 0722
- Vehicle registration: RN
- ISTAT code: 099

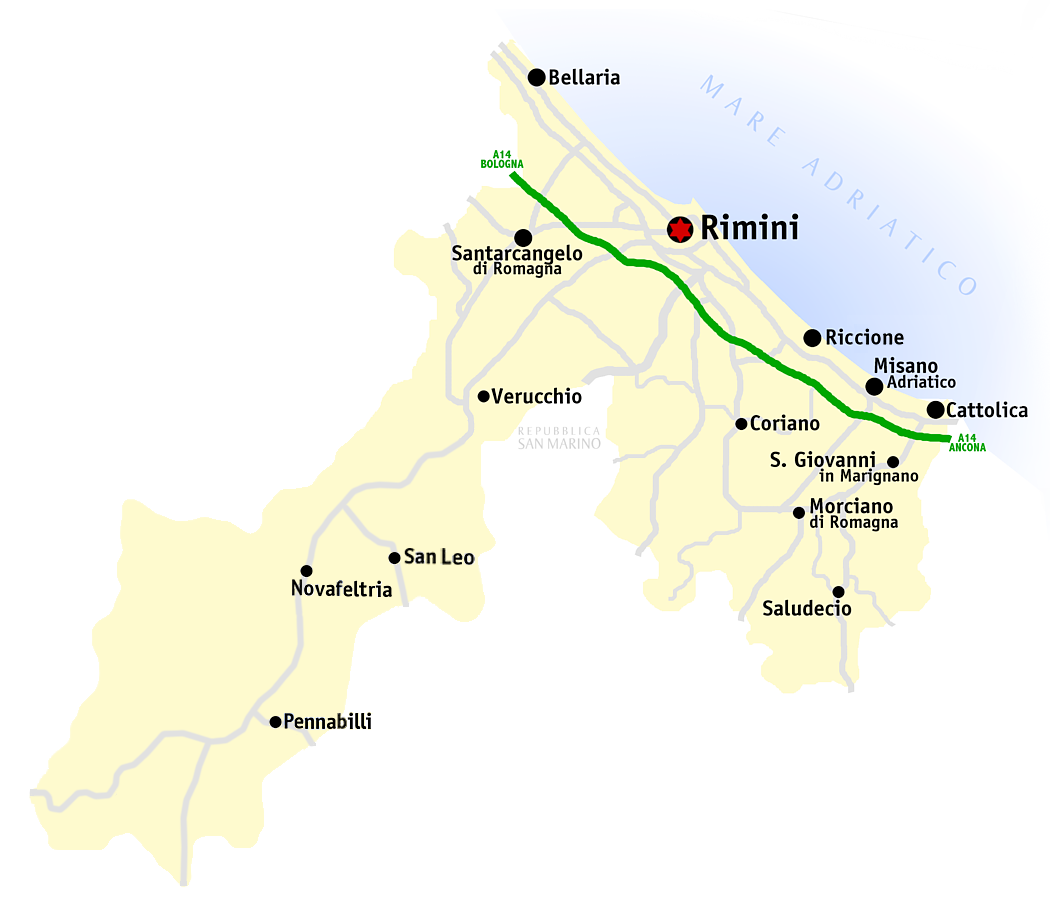
The province's major settlements before the transfers of Montecopiolo and Sassofeltrio

The province of Rimini (Italian: provincia di Rimini) is the southernmost province of the region of Emilia-Romagna in Italy. Its capital is the city of Rimini, one of the "seven sisters" of the historical region of Romagna. It has a population of 341,244 in an area of 921.77 square kilometres (355.90 sq mi).

The province borders the Adriatic Sea to its northeast, the province of Forlì-Cesena to its northwest, the province of Pesaro and Urbino, in the Marche region, to its south and southeast, the independent Republic of San Marino to its south, and the province of Arezzo in Tuscany to its southwest.

The province consists of 27 municipalities, centred on the valleys of the Marecchia and Conca rivers. Since the transfer of nine municipalities from Pesaro and Urbino in 2009 and 2021, the province of Rimini includes most of the historical region of Montefeltro.

== History ==
The province of Rimini was formed on 16 April 1992. Its municipalities were previously part of the province of Forlì, whose remaining part was renamed the province of Forlì-Cesena.

On 1 January 1996, the municipalities of Gemmano, Montefiore Conca, Saludecio, Mondaino, Montegridolfo, Montescudo, Monte Colombo, San Clemente, and Morciano di Romagna formed the Valconca Union. The union was formed to integrate public services across the municipalities . A clause working towards the municipalities' merger was repealed in 2009.

On 15 August 2009, seven municipalities were transferred from the province of Pesaro and Urbino, in the Marche region, to the province of Rimini. The comuni were Casteldelci, Maiolo, Novafeltria, Pennabilli, San Leo, Sant'Agata Feltria and Talamello.

On 1 January 2016, Montescudo and Monte Colombo were merged into a single municipality, Montescudo-Monte Colombo.

On 16 October 2016, a merger of the municipality of Montegridolfo, Mondaino and Saludecio was rejected at referendum. Montegridolfo and Mondaino voted 92.9% and 69.5% for the merger, but Saludecio voted 58.2% against.

On 17 June 2021, the municipalities of Montecopiolo and Sassofeltrio were transferred from the province of Pesaro and Urbino to the province of Rimini.

== Government ==
=== Municipalities ===
Twenty-seven comuni (municipalities) constitute the province of Rimini:

- The five coastal comuni, from northwest to southeast, are Bellaria-Igea Marina, Rimini, Riccione, Misano Adriatico, and Cattolica.
- Southeast of San Marino are the comuni of Coriano, Montescudo-Monte Colombo, Sassofeltrio, Gemmano, San Clemente, Morciano di Romagna, Montefiore Conca, Saludecio, San Giovanni in Marignano, Montegridolfo, and Mondaino. These comuni are centred on the valley of the Conca river, and are sometimes referred to as the Valconca comuni. Sassofeltrio was transferred from the province of Pesaro and Urbino to the province of Rimini on 17 June 2021.
- North and northwest of San Marino are the comuni of Santarcangelo di Romagna, Poggio Torriana and Verucchio. These three comuni are centred on the lower valley of the Marecchia river.
- West and southwest of San Marino are the comuni of Novafeltria, San Leo, Talamello, Maiolo, Sant'Agata Feltria, Pennabilli, Casteldelci, and Montecopiolo. With the exception of Montecopiolo, these seven comuni collectively constitute the Alta-Marecchia region, and were transferred from the province of Pesaro and Urbino to the province of Rimini on 15 August 2009. Montecopiolo, on the river Conca, was transferred on 17 June 2021.

== Demographics ==
As of 2026, the population is 341,244, of which 48.7% are male, and 51.3% are female. Minors make up 14.1% of the population, and seniors make up 25.3%.

Historical population
(current borders)

Year	Pop.	±%
1861	99,195	—
1871	107,966	+8.8%
1881	115,741	+7.2%
1901	130,227	+12.5%
1911	143,388	+10.1%
1921	156,408	+9.1%
1931	170,328	+8.9%
1936	176,013	+3.3%
1951	195,983	+11.3%

Year	Pop.	±%
1961	220,759	+12.6%
1971	250,473	+13.5%
1981	269,919	+7.8%
1991	278,047	+3.0%
2001	292,526	+5.2%
2011	324,389	+10.9%
2021	338,369	+4.3%
2022	339,169	+0.2%

Source: ISTAT

=== Immigration ===
As of 2025, immigrants make up 15.2% of the population. The 5 largest foreign countries of birth are Albania, Ukraine, Romania, Morocco, and Moldova.
