= Gemmano =

- Comune
- Comune di Gemmano
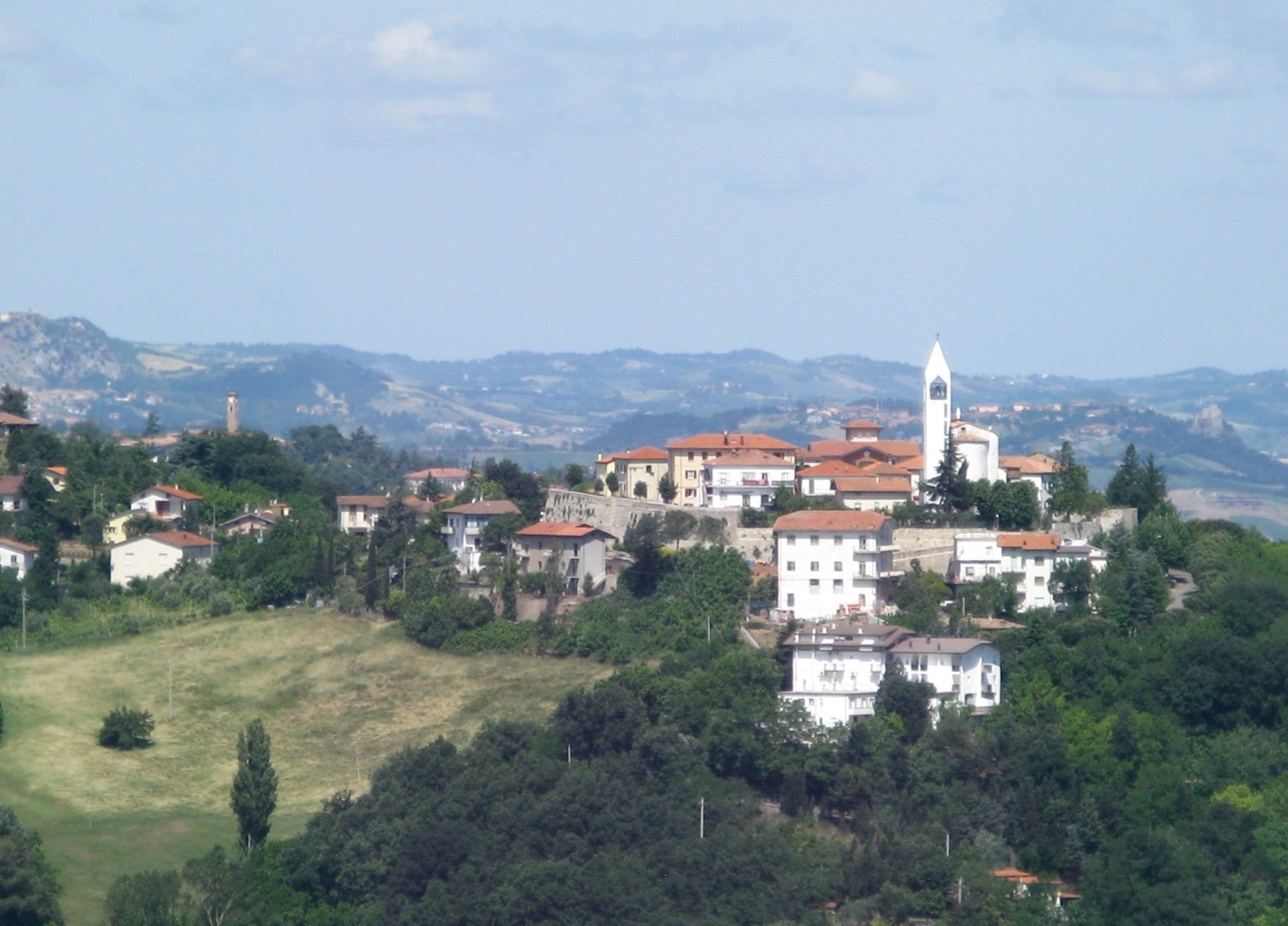

- Coat of arms

- Location within Italy Location within Emilia-Romagna
- Coordinates: 43°54′N 12°35′E
- Country: Italy
- Region: Emilia-Romagna
- Province: Rimini (RN)
- Frazioni: Onferno, Zollara, Marazzano, Farneto, Villa.

Government
  - Mayor: Riziero Santi

Area
  - Total: 18.85 km^{2} (7.28 sq mi)
- Elevation: 404 m (1,325 ft)

Population (31 May 2022)
  - Total: 1,119
  - Density: 59.36/km^{2} (153.8/sq mi)
- Demonym: Gemmanesi
- Time zone: UTC+1 (CET)
  - Summer (DST): UTC+2 (CEST)
- Postal code: 47040
- Dialing code: 0541
- Patron saint: St. Sebastian
- Saint day: 20 January
- Website: Official website

Gemmano (Romagnol: Zman) is a comune (municipality) in the Province of Rimini in the Italian region Emilia-Romagna, located about 120 kilometres (75 mi) southeast of Bologna and about 15 km (9 mi) south of Rimini.

Gemmano borders the following municipalities: Mercatino Conca, Montescudo-Monte Colombo, Montefiore Conca, San Clemente, Sassocorvaro Auditore, Sassofeltrio.

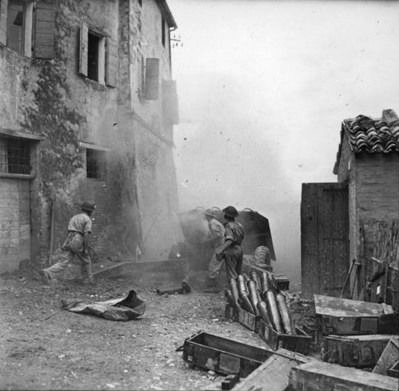
Shelling of German-held Gemmano in September 1944

Sights include the sanctuary of Madonna di Carbognano, built on the ancient site of a God Pan temple.

The town was razed during the Battle of Gemmano, an engagement in World War II.
