= Talamello =

- Comune
- Comune di Talamello
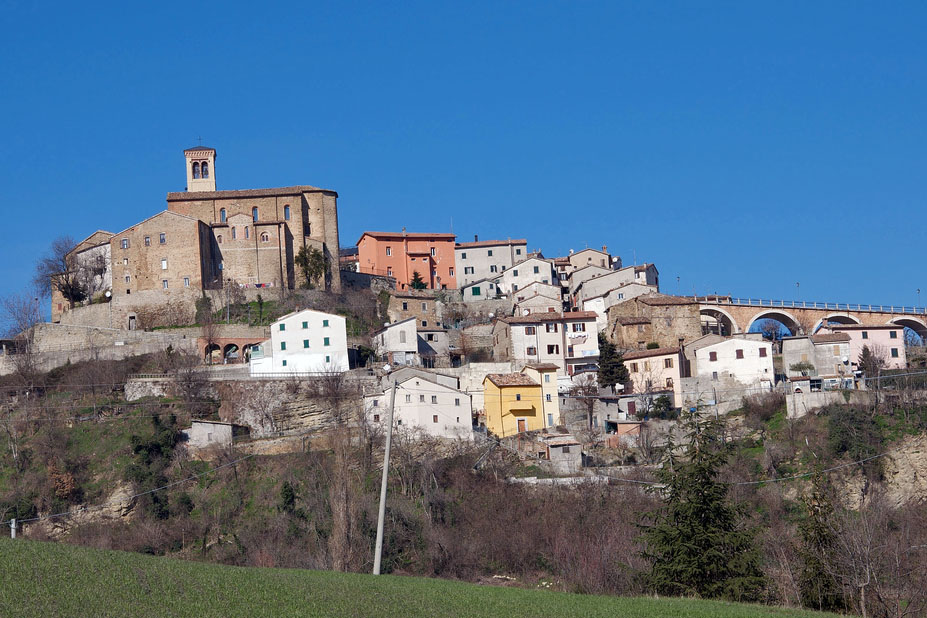

- Location within Italy Location within Emilia-Romagna
- Coordinates: 43°54′N 12°17′E
- Country: Italy
- Region: Emilia-Romagna
- Province: Rimini (RN)

Government
  - Mayor: Francesca Ugolini

Area
  - Total: 10.59 km^{2} (4.09 sq mi)
- Elevation: 386 m (1,266 ft)

Population (31 December 2014)
  - Total: 1,108
  - Density: 104.6/km^{2} (271.0/sq mi)
- Time zone: UTC+1 (CET)
  - Summer (DST): UTC+2 (CEST)
- Postal code: 47867
- Dialing code: 0541

Talamello (Romagnol: Talamèl) is a comune (municipality) in the Province of Rimini in the Italian region Emilia-Romagna, located about 130 kilometres (81 mi) southeast of Bologna and about 30 kilometres (19 mi) south of Rimini.

== Geography ==
Talamello borders the following municipalities: Maiolo, Mercato Saraceno, Novafeltria, Sogliano al Rubicone.

== History ==
Between 1921 and 1960, Talamello was served by the Rimini–Novafeltria railway. Following its closure, much of the railway was incorporated into the SP258 provincial road. The railway station is still extant in Talamello.

After the referendum of 17 and 18 December 2006, Talamello was detached from the province of Pesaro and Urbino (Marche) to join Emilia-Romagna and the province of Rimini on 15 August 2009.

== Notable people ==
- Amintore Galli (1845–1919), music publisher, academic, and composer, has his birthplace disputed between Perticara and Talamello: Galli's birth deed records that he was baptised in Talamello – Perticara's church did not have a baptismal font – but his parents are recorded as living in Perticara.

== See also ==
- Ambra di Talamello – a cheese produced in pits in Talamello
