= Montescudo-Monte Colombo =

- Comune
- Comune di Montescudo-Monte Colombo
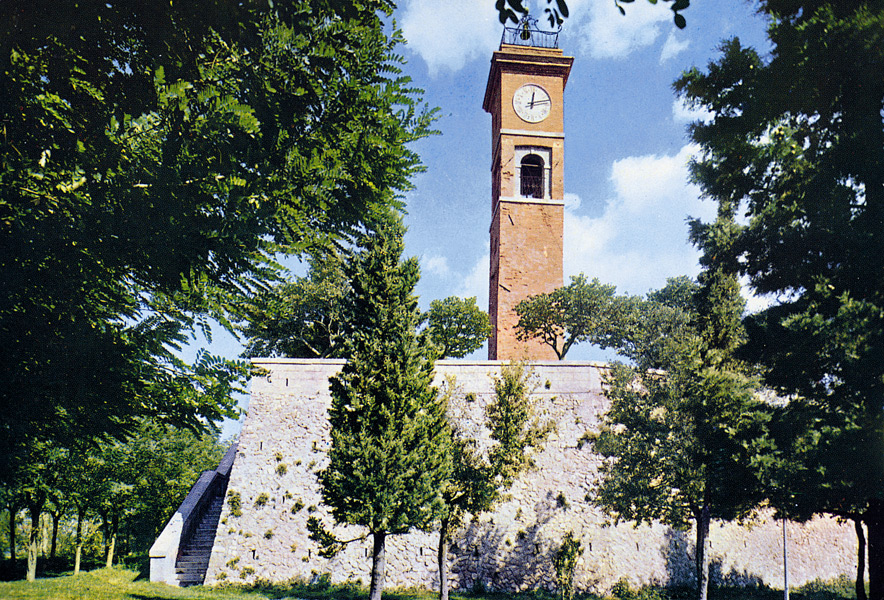
- Civic Tower of Montescudo

- Coat of arms

- Location within Italy Location within Emilia-Romagna
- Coordinates: 43°55′N 12°33′E
- Country: Italy
- Region: Emilia-Romagna
- Province: Rimini (RM)
- Frazioni: Montescudo, Monte Colombo

Government
  - Mayor: Elena Castellari

Area
  - Total: 32.35 km^{2} (12.49 sq mi)

Population (30 November 2017)
  - Total: 6,852
  - Density: 211.8/km^{2} (548.6/sq mi)
- Time zone: UTC+1 (CET)
  - Summer (DST): UTC+2 (CEST)
- Postal code: 47854
- Dialing code: 0541
- Website: Official website

Montescudo-Monte Colombo is a comune (municipality) in the Province of Rimini in the Italian region Emilia-Romagna.

It was established on 1 January 2016 by the merger of the municipalities of Montescudo and Monte Colombo.
