= Montecopiolo =

- Comune
- Comune di Montecopiolo
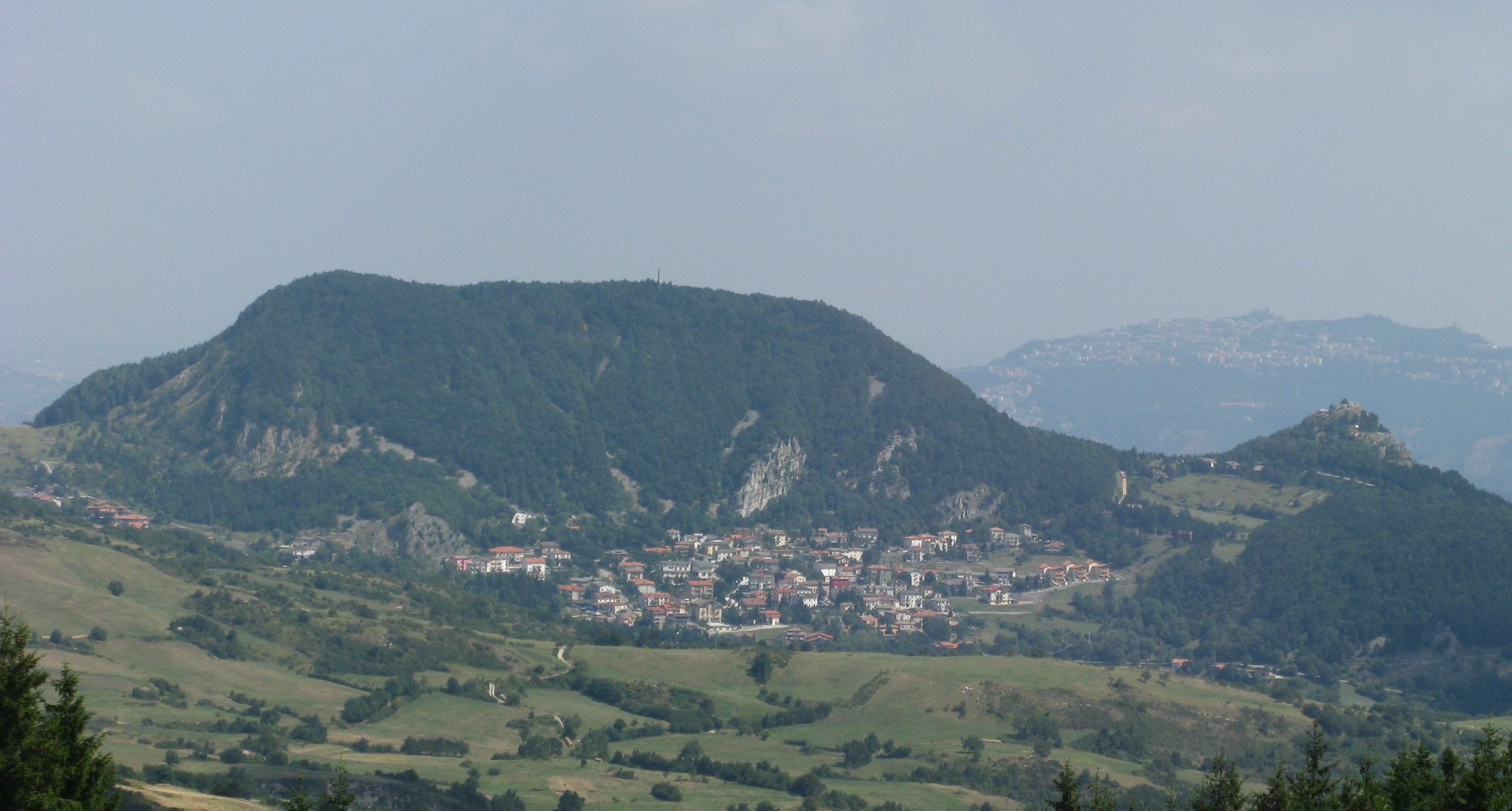

- Coat of arms

- Location within Italy Location within Emilia-Romagna
- Coordinates: 43°50′N 12°22′E
- Country: Italy
- Region: Emilia-Romagna
- Province: Rimini (RN)
- Frazioni: Badia, Belvedere, Calvillano, Ca' Moneta, Pugliano, Ca' Bernacchia, Campo D'Arco, Casentino, Santa Rita, Villagrande (township's seat)

Government
  - Mayor: Alfonso Lattanzi

Area
  - Total: 35.7 km^{2} (13.8 sq mi)
- Elevation: 915 m (3,002 ft)

Population (2008)
  - Total: 2,158
  - Density: 60.4/km^{2} (157/sq mi)
- Demonym(s): Villagrandesi (township frazione), Montecopiolesi (residents in the commune)
- Time zone: UTC+1 (CET)
  - Summer (DST): UTC+2 (CEST)
- Postal code: 61014
- Dialing code: 0722
- Website: Official website

Montecopiolo is a comune (municipality) in the Province of Rimini in the Italian region Emilia-Romagna, located about 139 kilometres (86 mi) southeast of Bologna and about 29 kilometres (18 mi) west of Rimini. It is formed by several villages, none exactly called Montecopiolo; the communal seat is in Villagrande.

On June 24-25, 2007, Montecopiolo, alongside the nearby comune of Sassofeltrio, voted in a referendum to detach from neighboring Province of Pesaro and Urbino in Marche region, it came into effect 14 years later on June 17, 2021.

Montecopiolo borders the following municipalities: Carpegna, Macerata Feltria, Maiolo, Monte Cerignone, Monte Grimano, Pennabilli, Pietrarubbia, San Leo. It is home to a hill castle, built in the 10th century, at 1,030 metres (3,380 ft) above sea level.

== Twin towns ==
- Mont-Saint-Martin, France
