= Sassofeltrio =

- Comune
- Comune di Sassofeltrio
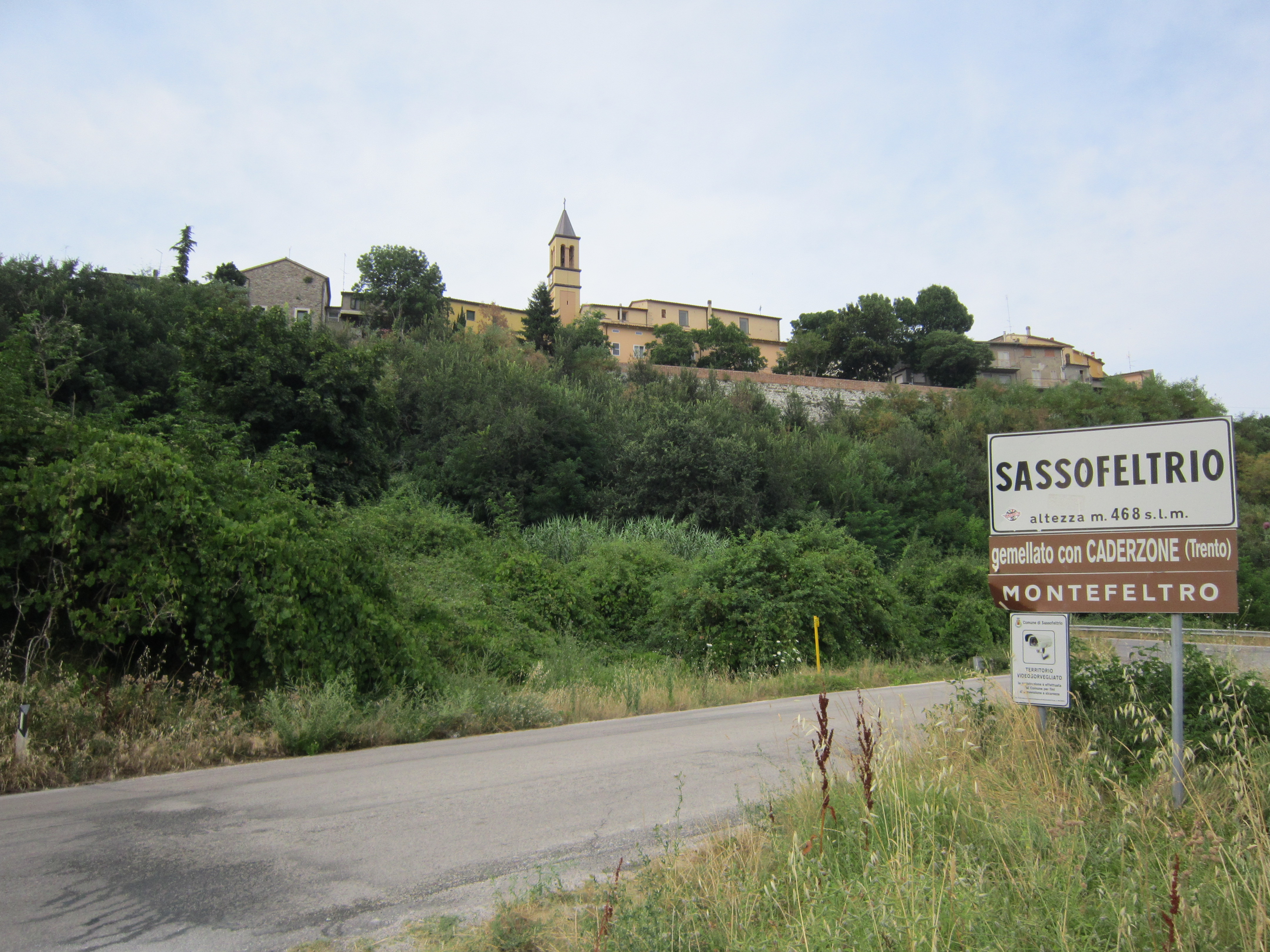

- Location within Italy Location within Emilia-Romagna
- Coordinates: 43°53′N 12°31′E
- Country: Italy
- Region: Emilia-Romagna
- Province: Rimini (RN)
- Frazioni: Ca' Miccio, Fratte, Gesso

Government
  - Mayor: Fabio Medici

Area
  - Total: 21.08 km^{2} (8.14 sq mi)
- Elevation: 468 m (1,535 ft)

Population (31 May 2022)
  - Total: 1,353
  - Density: 64.18/km^{2} (166.2/sq mi)
- Demonym: Sassofeltresi
- Time zone: UTC+1 (CET)
  - Summer (DST): UTC+2 (CEST)
- Postal code: 47869
- Dialing code: 0541
- Patron saint: St. Blaise
- Saint day: February 3
- Website: Official website

Sassofeltrio is a comune (municipality) in the Province of Rimini in the Italian region Emilia-Romagna, located about 145 kilometres (90 mi) southeast of Bologna and about 21 kilometres (13 mi) south of Rimini.

On June 24-25, 2007, Sassofeltrio, alongside the nearby comune of Montecopiolo, voted in a referendum to detach from neighboring Province of Pesaro and Urbino in Marche region in favor of Province of Rimini in Emilia-Romagna, it came into effect 14 years later on June 17, 2021.

Sassofeltrio borders the following municipalities: Chiesanuova (San Marino), Faetano (San Marino), Fiorentino (San Marino), Gemmano, Mercatino Conca, Montegiardino (San Marino), Monte Grimano, Montescudo, San Leo, Verucchio.

== Twin towns ==
- Caderzone Terme, Italy
