= Pennabilli =

- Comune
- Comune di Pennabilli
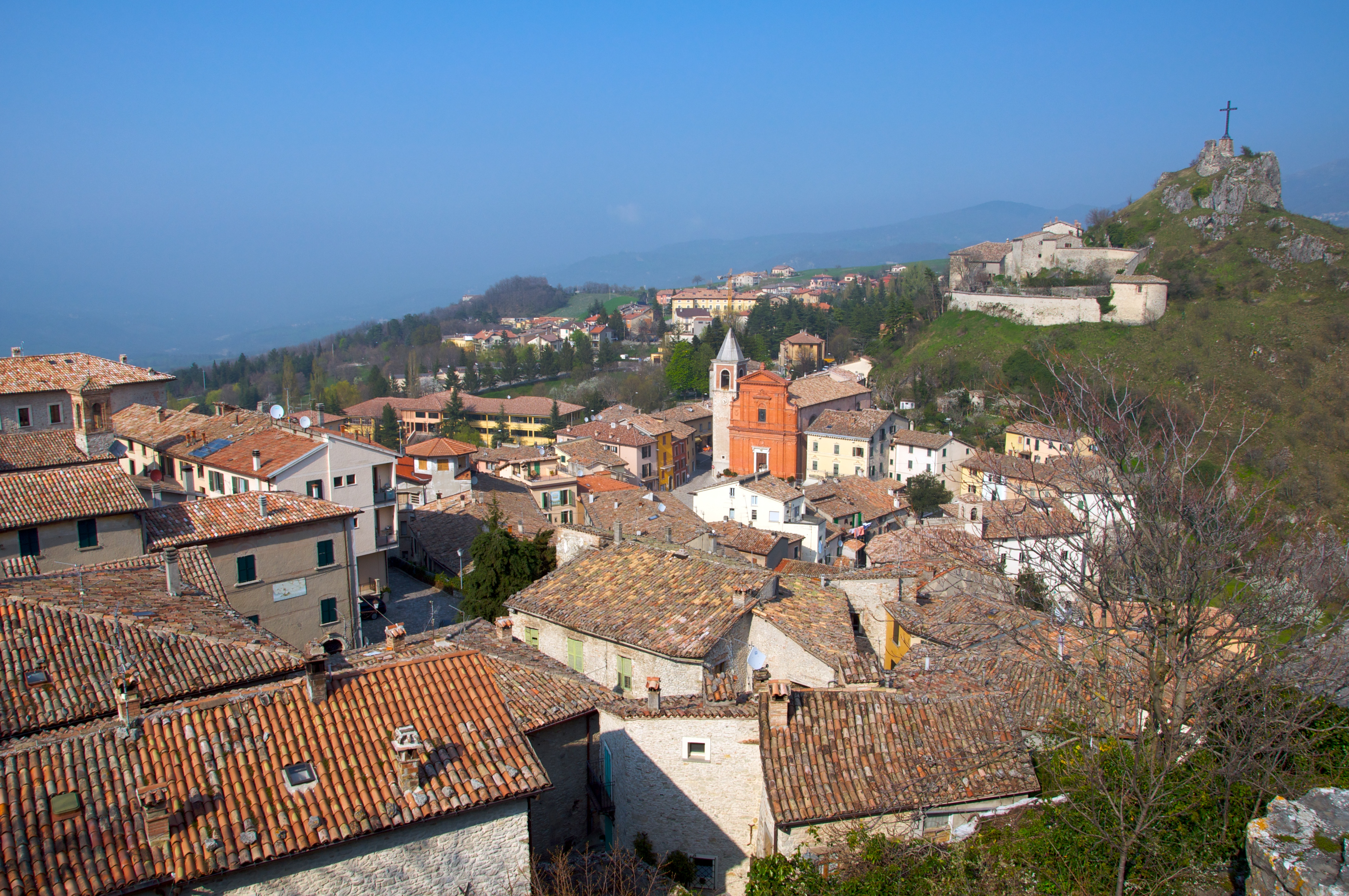

- Coat of arms

- Location within Italy Location within Emilia-Romagna
- Coordinates: 43°49′N 12°16′E
- Country: Italy
- Region: Emilia-Romagna
- Province: Rimini (RN)
- Frazioni: Ca' Romano, Maciano, Miratoio, Molino di Bascio, Ponte Messa, Scavolino, Soanne, Passo Cantoniera

Government
  - Mayor: Mauro Giannini

Area
  - Total: 69.6 km^{2} (26.9 sq mi)
- Elevation: 629 m (2,064 ft)

Population (31 December 2008)
  - Total: 3,098
  - Density: 44.5/km^{2} (115/sq mi)
- Demonym: Pennesi
- Time zone: UTC+1 (CET)
  - Summer (DST): UTC+2 (CEST)
- Postal code: 61016
- Dialing code: 0541
- Patron saint: Saint Pius V
- Saint day: 5 May
- Website: Official website

Pennabilli (Romagnol: La Pénna) is a comune (municipality) in the Province of Rimini in the Italian region Emilia-Romagna, located about 140 kilometres (87 mi) southeast of Bologna and about 45 kilometres (28 mi) south of Rimini. In 2019, the podcast This is Love spoke with Anna Bonavita about her love for Pennabilli in their episode, "Anna and Massimo."

== History ==
It was divided between the County of Montefeltro (later Duchy of Urbino) and the Sovereign County of Carpegna and in 1685 became the seat of an independent Principality of the Carpegna family with the title of Prince of the Holy Roman Empire, the first Prince Ulderico was a grandson of Robert Dudley, titular Duke of Northumberland.

Until 15 August 2009, the comune belonged to the Marche (Province of Pesaro-Urbino) from which it was detached, together with six other municipalities of the Alta Valmarecchia area, following the implementation of the outcome of a referendum held on 17 and 18 December 2006.

Pennabilli is still the seat of the Diocese of San Marino-Montefeltro.
