= Novafeltria =

- Comune
- Comune di Novafeltria
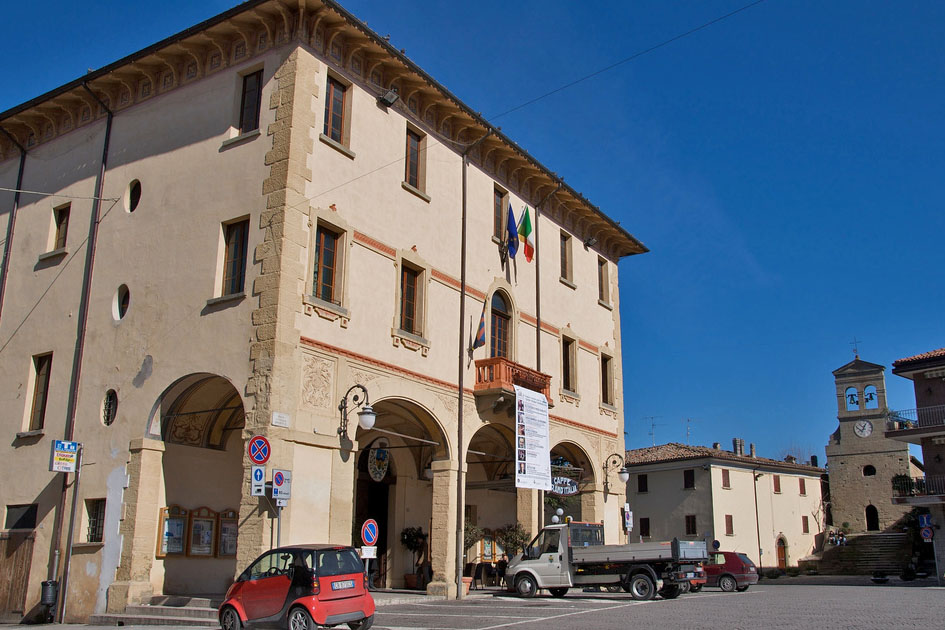
- Town Hall

- Coat of arms

- Location within Italy Location within Emilia-Romagna
- Coordinates: 43°54′N 12°17′E
- Country: Italy
- Region: Emilia-Romagna
- Province: Rimini (RN)
- Frazioni: Libiano, Perticara, Sartiano, Secchiano Marecchia, Torricella

Government
  - Mayor: Stefano Zanchini

Area
  - Total: 41.8 km^{2} (16.1 sq mi)
- Elevation: 275 m (902 ft)

Population (2008)
  - Total: 7,258
  - Density: 174/km^{2} (450/sq mi)
- Demonym: Novafeltriesi
- Time zone: UTC+1 (CET)
  - Summer (DST): UTC+2 (CEST)
- Postal code: 47863
- Dialing code: 0541
- Patron saint: Sts. Peter and Paul
- Saint day: 29 June
- Website: Official website

Novafeltria, historically Mercatino Marecchia (Romagnol: Marcadèn d'la Marecia), is a comune in the province of Rimini, in the region of Emilia-Romagna, northern Italy.

== Geography ==
The town is located about 130 kilometres (81 mi) southeast of Bologna and about 30 kilometres (19 mi) south of Rimini. It is the main center of the Montefeltro traditional region. It is located on the Marecchia river.

== History ==
The town was historically known as Mercatino Marecchia. It is first recorded in 950 AD as the parish of San Pietro in cult (on cultivated land).

As a medieval market town, Mercantino Marecchia was an open meeting place, without town walls, similar to Mercantino Conca. Its position by the Marecchia river, at the meeting point of roads to San Leo, Talamello, and Sant'Agata Feltria, facilitated its function in the local economy. The market fairs were traditionally held in August.

In the early sixteenth century, the Counts of Segni from Bologna built a villa in Mercatino Marecchia, which is the present-day municipal hall.

The comune of Mercantino Marecchia was created on 24 March 1907 from hamlets detached from Talamello.

In 1922, the town became the terminus of the Rimini–Mercatino Marecchia railway, which operated until its replacement with a bus route in 1960. The railway's construction was mainly motivated by the transport of sulphur from the mines of Perticara to Rimini. Sulphur was transported to the station from Perticara along a cableway, which measured 6 kilometres (3.7 miles) in length and was built in 1922. The line also transported gypsum mined in Secchiano, which, along with Ponte Santa Maria Maddalena, had intermediate stops on the railway. Novafeltria's railway station is still extant, and its locomotive shed is now used by replacement buses. The station included a water tank. Secchiano's railway station is also still extant, and is currently residential property.

In 1941, the town was renamed as Novafeltria.

On 17 and 18 December 2006, voters in Novafeltria voted to detach from the province of Pesaro and Urbino, in the Marche, to join the province of Rimini, in Emilia-Romagna. Of 6,239 eligible voters, 4,275 voters (68.5%) voted. There were 3,480 votes (82.2%) to join Rimini, and 756 votes (17.8%) to stay in Pesaro and Urbino. Novafeltria was transferred to the province of Rimini on 15 August 2009.

== Notable people ==
- Ivan Graziani (1945–97), Singer, died in Novafeltria
- Sergio Valentini (1938–90), President of SILB (Sindacato italiano locali da ballo) died in Düsseldorf
- Alessandro Ahmetaj (born 2000), footballer
