= San Leo =

- Comune
- Comune di San Leo
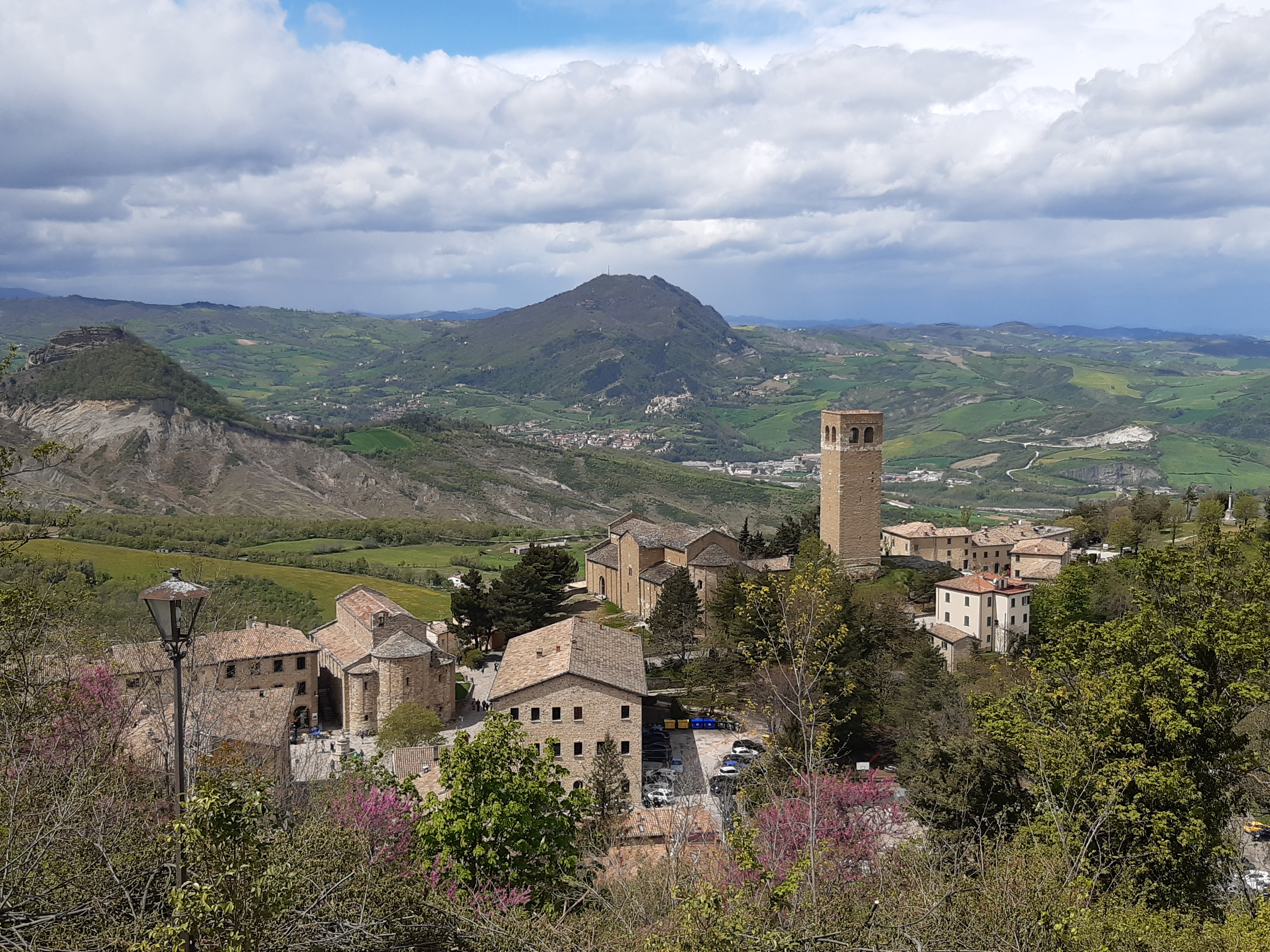
- Panorama of San Leo

- Location within Italy Location within Emilia-Romagna
- Coordinates: 43°53′47″N 12°20′36″E
- Country: Italy
- Region: Emilia-Romagna
- Province: Rimini (RN)
- Frazioni: Agenzia, Capicchio, Castelnuovo, Montefotogno, Montemaggio, Pietracuta, Pietramaura, Santa Lucia, Tausano, Torello

Government
  - Mayor: Mauro Guerra

Area
  - Total: 53.3 km^{2} (20.6 sq mi)
- Elevation: 589 m (1,932 ft)

Population (2022)
  - Total: 2,829
  - Density: 53.1/km^{2} (137/sq mi)
- Demonym: Leontini
- Time zone: UTC+1 (CET)
  - Summer (DST): UTC+2 (CEST)
- Postal code: 47865
- Dialing code: 0541
- Patron saint: Saint Leo
- Saint day: August 1
- Website: Official website

San Leo (Romagnol: San Lé) is a comune (municipality) in the Province of Rimini in the Italian region Emilia-Romagna, located about 135 kilometres (84 mi) southeast of Bologna and about 35 kilometres (22 mi) southwest of Rimini. It is one of I Borghi più belli d'Italia ("The most beautiful villages of Italy").

== Geography ==
San Leo borders the following Italian municipalities: Maiolo, Montecopiolo, Monte Grimano, Novafeltria, Sassofeltrio, Torriana, Verucchio, as also, in the independent State of San Marino, Acquaviva, Chiesanuova, and the City of San Marino.

San Leo is the location of a large fortress, situated at an elevation of 600 metres (2,000 ft) above sea level. The San Leo Co-Cathedral is a Romanesque church.

== History ==
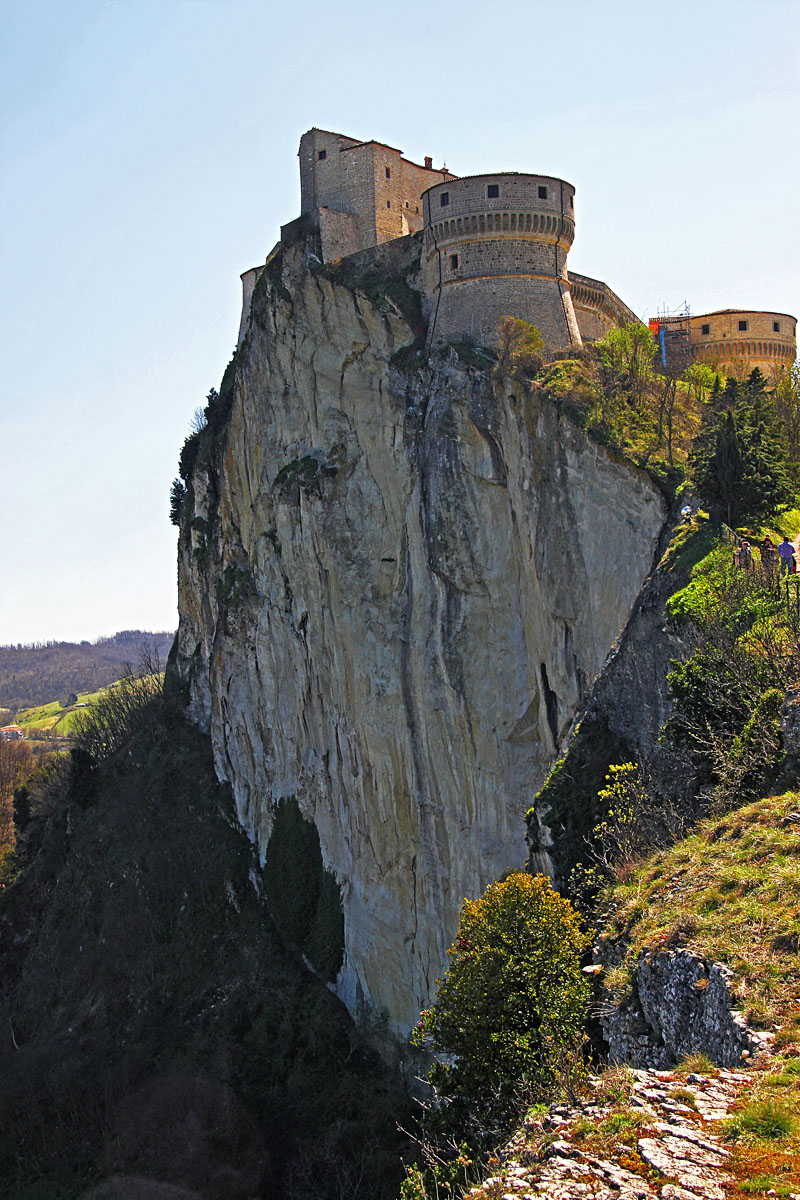
San Leo from the N-NW

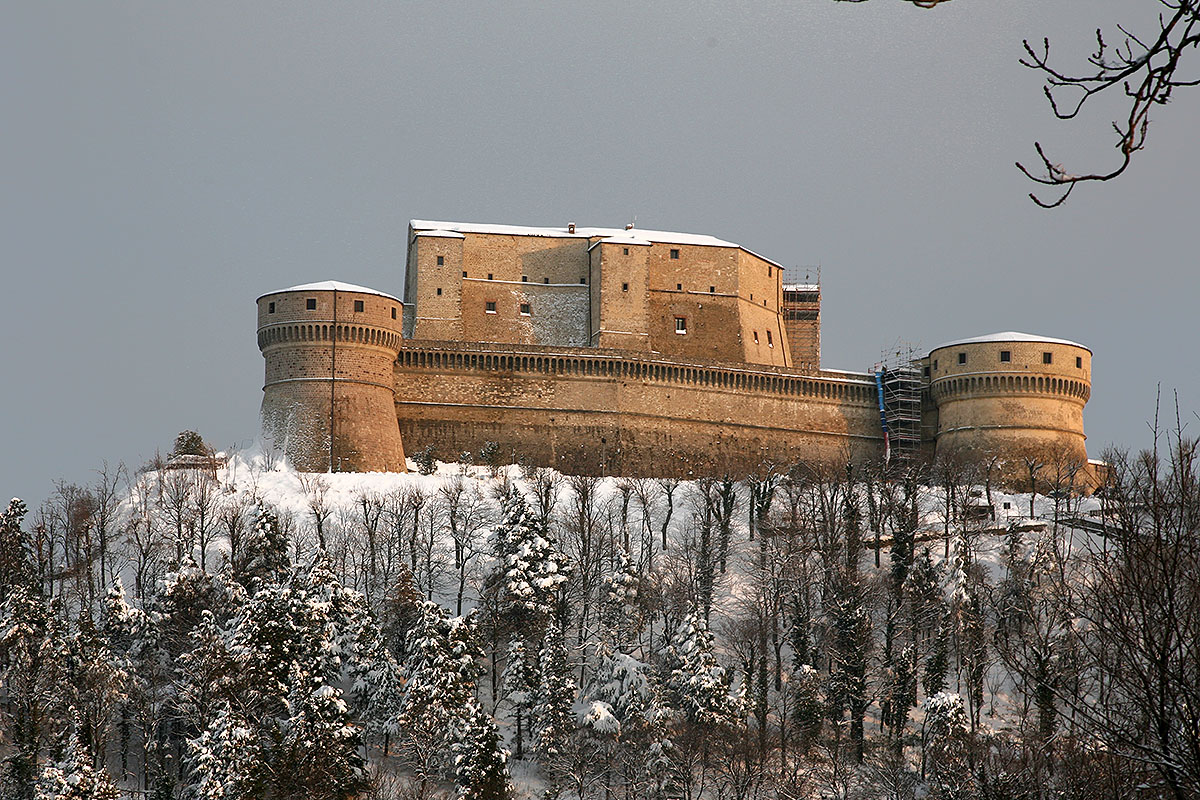
The fortress (Rocca) of San Leo

San Leo was served by the Rimini–Novafeltria railway, beginning with a terminus in Torello in 1921. The government of San Marino had expressed its desire for a station in the locality from the railway's planning in 1905, committing 1,000 lire annually for fifty years for the station. With the exception of the years of operation of the Rimini–San Marino railway (1932–44), San Marino-Torello was the closest railway connection to San Marino. On 18 June 1922, the railway was extended to Mercantino Marecchia, with stops in Pietracuta and just after the Torrente Mazzocco. The railway closed in 1960. The station buildings of Torello and Pietracuta are extant, with the latter being residential property.

San Leo was also supposed to be served by the Santarcangelo–Urbino railway, also known as the subappenine railway, which would have connected Santarcangelo di Romagna with Urbino. The project was intended to provide an inland alternative to the Bologna–Ancona railway, whose coastal position made it vulnerable to bombardment. It was abandoned in 1933, but some tracks had already been laid in the section from Santarcangelo to San Leo. Some of these tracks were reused by the Rimini–Novafeltria railway along a new post-war alignment. Viaducts of the former Novafeltria route are still extant among farmland, as well as a tunnel in Il Peggio built for the subappenine railway, which became a mushroom farm.

After the referendum of 17 and 18 December 2006, San Leo was detached from the Province of Pesaro and Urbino (Marche) to join Emilia-Romagna and the Province of Rimini on 15 August 2009.

== International relations ==
- San Marino, San Marino (1995)
