= San Clemente, Emilia-Romagna =

San Clemente
- Comune
- Comune di San Clemente
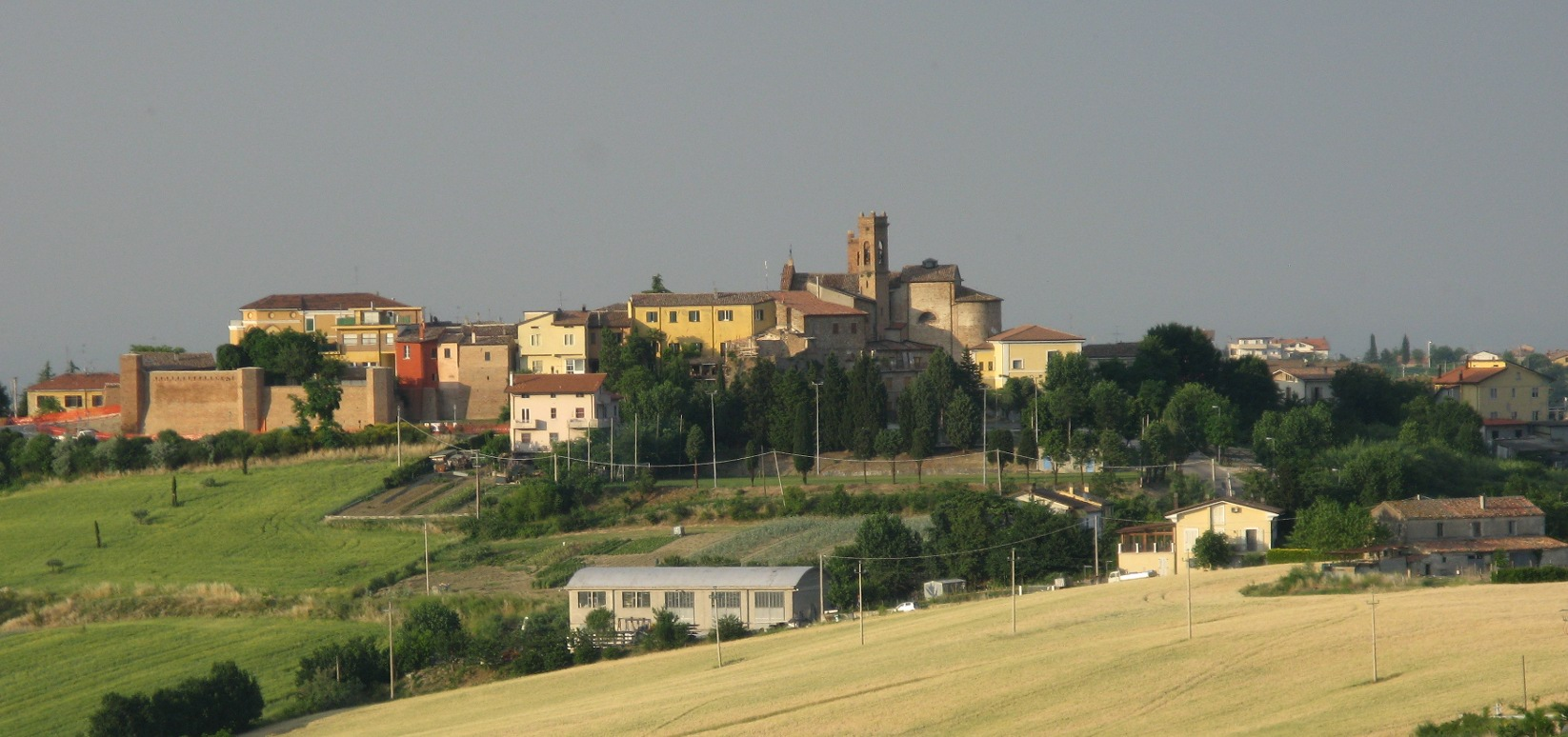

- Coat of arms

- Location within Italy Location within Emilia-Romagna
- Coordinates: 43°57′N 12°35′E
- Country: Italy
- Region: Emilia-Romagna
- Province: Rimini (RN)
- Frazioni: Agello, Casarola, Cevolabbate, Fornace, Sant'andrea in Casale

Government
  - Mayor: Mirna Cecchini

Area
  - Total: 20.7 km^{2} (8.0 sq mi)

Population (30 November 2017)
  - Total: 5,536
  - Density: 267/km^{2} (693/sq mi)
- Demonym: Sanclementesi
- Time zone: UTC+1 (CET)
  - Summer (DST): UTC+2 (CEST)
- Postal code: 47832
- Dialing code: 0541
- Patron saint: Pope Clement I
- Saint day: November 23
- Website: Official website

San Clemente (Romagnol: San Climènt) is a comune (municipality) in the Province of Rimini, but before 1992 in the Province of Forlì, in the Italian region Emilia-Romagna, located about 120 kilometres (75 mi) southeast of Bologna, about 65 kilometres (40 mi) southeast of Forlì and about 11 kilometres (7 mi) south of Rimini.

== Main sights ==
- Malatesta castle, whose walls include part of the town.
- Fortified Malatesta villa at Castelleale
