= Rimini–Novafeltria railway =

Former railway line in Italy (1916–60)

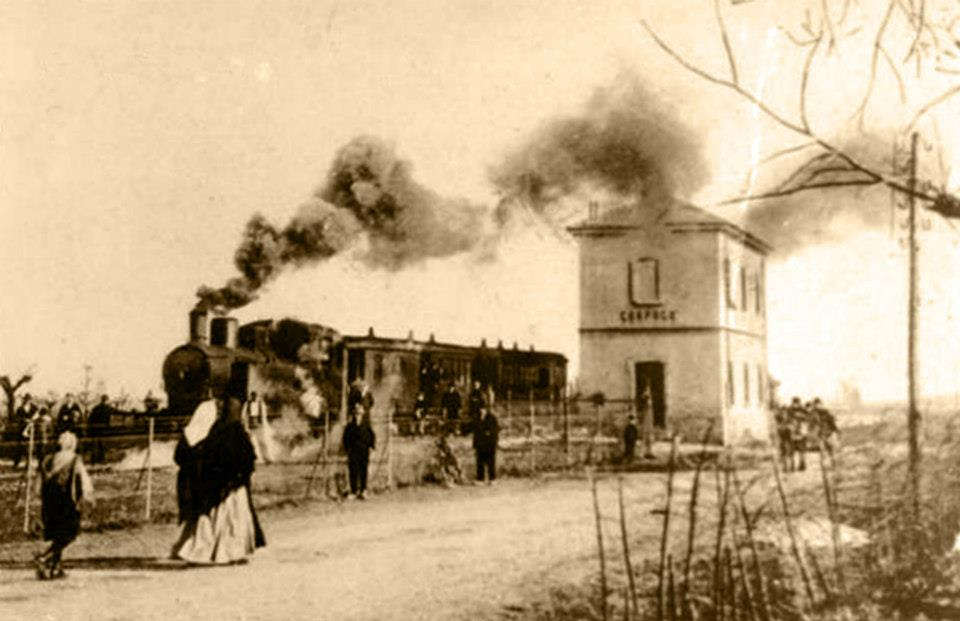
- A steam train at Corpolò railway station

Overview
- Other name(s): Rimini–Mercatino Marecchia railway (until 1941)
- Native name: Ferrovia Rimini–Novafeltria
- Status: Dismantled
- Locale: Province of Forlì; Province of Pesaro and Urbino
- Termini: Rimini Centrale; Novafeltria
- Stations: 18

Service
- Type: Heavy rail
- Operator(s): Società Anonima delle Ferrovie e Tramvie Padane (1916–32); Gestione Governativa Ferrovie Padane (1932–60)

History
- Opened: 21 June 1916 (Rimini–Verucchio); 1921 (Verucchio–San Marino-Torello); 18 June 1922 (San Marino-Torello–Mercatino Marecchia)
- Closed: 15 October 1960

Technical
- Line length: 33.23 km (20.65 mi)
- Number of tracks: 1
- Track gauge: 950 mm (3 ft 1 3/8 in)
- Highest elevation: 256 m (840 ft)

The Rimini–Novafeltria railway was a narrow-gauge railway between Rimini and Novafeltria, known as Mercatino Marecchia until 1941, that operated between 1922 and 1960.

The railway's primary purpose was to transport sulphur from the mines of Perticara to Rimini, from where it could be transported by sea or along the Bologna–Ancona railway. Sixteen intermediate passenger stops served settlements along the Marecchia valley, including Verucchio and Talamello. The trains were slow and the route was considered dangerous, skirting Rimini's historic city walls and running adjacent to the SP258 provincial road. On 15 October 1960, the railway was closed and replaced with a coach service.

The railway was intended to intersect with the Santarcangelo–Urbino railway railway project, abandoned in 1933. Except for the years of operation of the Rimini–San Marino railway (1932–44), a station in Torello provided the closest railway connection to San Marino, albeit in Italian territory. The railway was featured in Scartamento ridotto (1952), an early documentary by Sergio Zavoli, which explored local views about the replacement of the railway's steam engine with oil-powered railcars.

== History ==
=== Construction and inauguration ===
On 10 March 1913, an act of parliament gave the concession for the railway's construction to the Società Anonima delle Ferrovie e Tramvie Padane (FTP). The railway's construction was mainly motivated by the transport of sulphur to Rimini from the mines of Perticara, which were bought by Montecatini in 1917, though the line also transported gypsum mined in Secchiano. The rugged terrain of the Marecchia valley made the area difficult to connect by road, leaving the mines at Perticara valuable but isolated.

The railway opened to traffic on 21 June 1916 between Rimini and Verucchio. It was extended to the station of San Marino-Torello in 1921. The government of San Marino had expressed its desire for a station in the locality from the railway's planning in 1905, committing 1,000 lire annually for fifty years for the station. With the exception of the years of operation of the Rimini–San Marino railway (1932–44), San Marino-Torello was the closest railway connection to San Marino.

On 18 June 1922, the final section to Mercantino Marecchia was inaugurated. The inaugural train, which departed Rimini Centrale at 9.30am, was watched by villagers along the valley of the Marecchia, concluding with a fair in Mercatino Marecchia.

=== Operation ===
In 1932, FTP suffered a financial collapse. On 7 September 1933, through the Gestione Governativa Ferrovie Padane, the government temporarily assumed the management of the railway, which it would maintain until the line's closure. In 1941, Mercantino Marecchia was renamed as Novafeltria.

The railway was considerably damaged during the Second World War, but was reactivated by 1948. Following the war, the line was modified between Dogana and Pietracuta, reducing the route's length by 643 metres (2,110 feet) by crossing the San Marino river further downstream. The new route used tracks that had been laid for the never-completed Santarcangelo–Urbino railway, also known as the subappenine railway, which would have connected Santarcangelo di Romagna with Urbino. The project was intended to provide an inland alternative to the Bologna–Ancona railway, whose coastal position made it vulnerable to bombardment. It was abandoned in 1933, but some tracks had already been laid in the section from Santarcangelo to San Leo.

In 1952, the railway's steam locomotive was replaced with three diesel locomotives, with a fourth added in 1955. Scartamento ridotto (1952), an early documentary by Riminese journalist Sergio Zavoli for RAI, explored local views on the replacement. Farmers saw it as an innovation, while local government recognised the railway's continued economic unviability, and an interviewed conductor expressed nostalgia for the steam locomotive. The railway's motorisation coincided with increased passenger numbers, from a median of 18,000 monthly passengers in 1951 to 45,000 in 1956. In 1958, additional services were scheduled between Rimini and Villa Verucchio, the most-used section of the railway.

=== Suppression ===
On 15 October 1960, the railway was closed and replaced with a bus service, having run for some years with irrecuperable deficits. Its closure had been proposed three years earlier. Much of the railway was incorporated into the SP258 provincial road. To allow the road's widening, the tracks in the province of Forlì were removed in 1964, costing 17.5 million lire. Other parts of the railway were subsumed by urban development or returned to farmland. In 1997, all the railway's assets were ceded to the regional government of Emilia-Romagna.

The Route 160 bus line, operated by Start Romagna SpA, replaces the railway today.

== Route ==
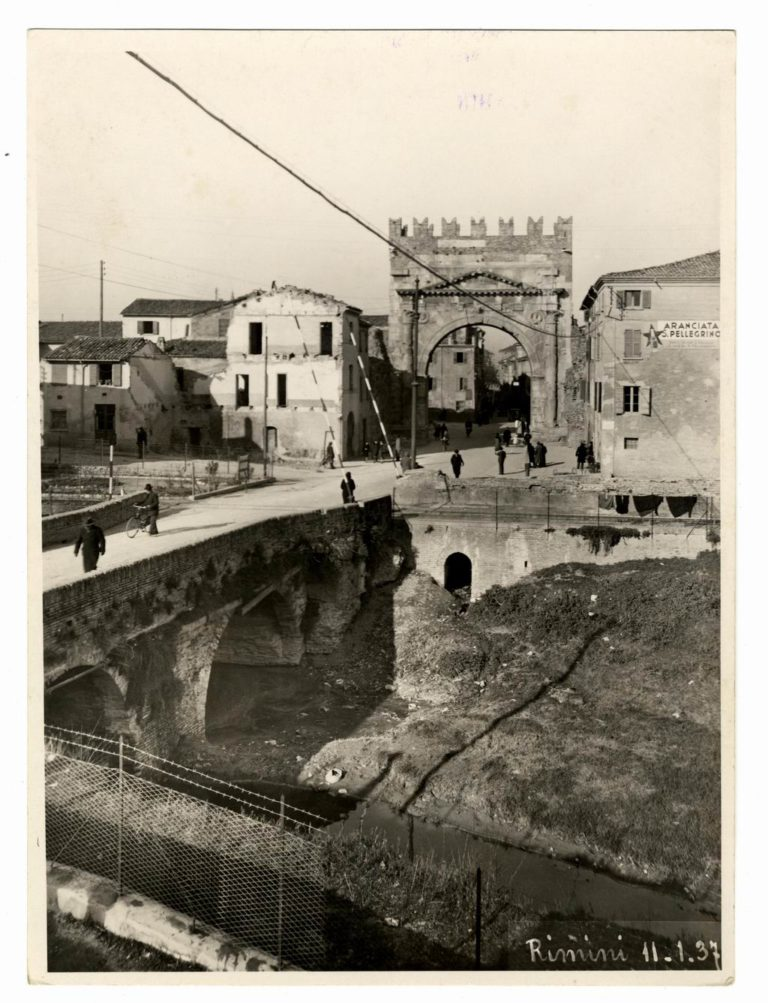
The railway's level crossing with the Via Flaminia in front of the Arch of Augustus in a 1937 photograph

The route started in Rimini Centrale. Turning right (southwest) to follow the Ausa river, the line skirted Rimini's Roman amphitheatre and city walls. In front of the Arch of Augustus, an incongruous level crossing intersected the Via Flaminia. The line turned north at the present-day Parco Olga Bondi to reach its first station, Rimini Porta Montanara, near the eponymous gate. After a sharp 90-degree turn, the line headed west along the Marecchia valley, mostly alongside the SP258 provincial road. Its second stop was Fornaci, 300 metres (980 feet) west of the present-day overpass of the SS16 state road. After Fornaci, the railway turned on a southeasterly bearing, meeting the stations of Spadarolo, Vergiano, Casale Sarzana, Sant'Ermete, Corpolò, and Villa Verucchio. Reaching the Marecchia, the line turned left (south) to serve Verucchio, then bent southwest to reach Dogana. It crossed the San Marino river to reach the station of Torello, then continued to reach Pietracuta. After Pietracuta, it crossed the Torrente Mazzocco to reach Bivio San Leo. Crossing the Marecchia at Ponte Santa Maria Maddalena, it made an S-bend, then continued southeast to Secchiano, Talamello-Campiano, and finally Novafeltria.

The line's total length was 33.23 kilometres (20.65 miles). Its lowest elevation was at Rimini Centrale at 5 metres (16 feet) above mean sea level, and its highest elevation was at Novafeltria at 256 metres (840 feet) above mean sea level. The route was considered structurally dangerous and impractical, especially its route around Rimini's city centre and its proximity to cars travelling along the provincial road.

== Features ==
The line used a 950 mm (3 ft 1 3/8 in) narrow gauge. The convoys ran so slowly that locals called the railway amaza sumèr (Romagnol, lit. 'it kills a donkey'), as it could not have harmed anything more than a donkey.

As of 2012, the foundations of the original bridge over the San Marino river are still visible, as well as the piers of viaducts of the original route west of Torello between Via Marecchiese and Via Torello. A viaduct near Secchiano has been reused as a pedestrian pathway.

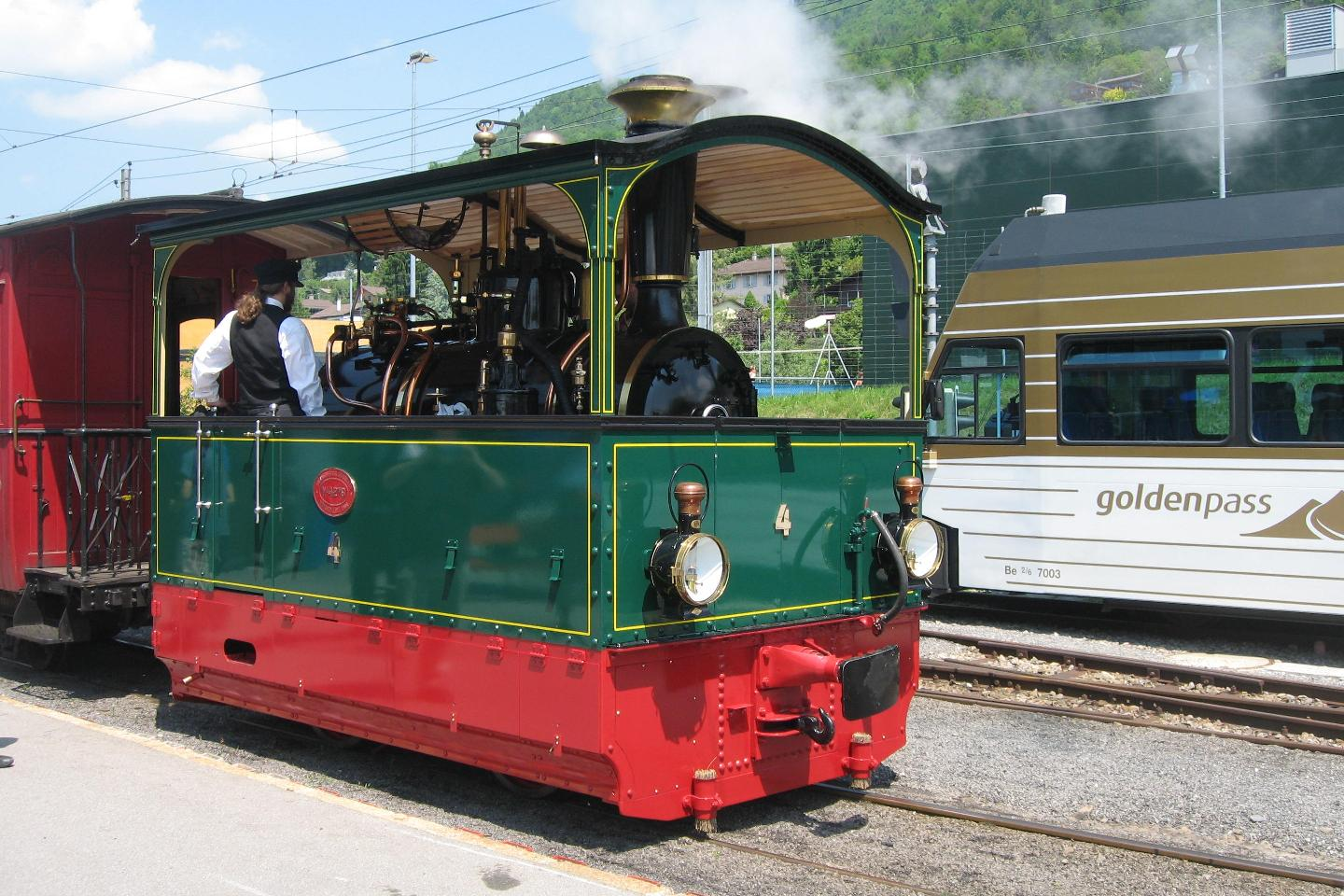
A Krauss steam locomotive belonging to the Rimini–Novafeltria railway at the Blonay–Chamby Museum Railway, July 2012

Following the line's closure, the rolling stock was bought by the Ferrovia Circumetnea, and transported by railway to Catania in February 1961. Five older steam locomotives, alongside five carriages and several wagons, were abandoned by Rimini Centrale, where they were vandalised and weathered. In July 1967, "about thirty long-haired individuals, mostly minors" were arrested after taking residence in two disused wagons, causing a considerable noise disturbance. The wagons were finally disposed in October 1970. A Krauss steam locomotive dating to 1900 was transported to the Blonay–Chamby Museum Railway in Switzerland.

== Stations ==
=== Rimini Centrale railway station ===
Rimini Centrale railway station was the terminus of the Rimini–Novafeltria railway, located less than 150 metres (490 feet) from Rimini railway station. From Rimini Centrale, sulphur could reach Rimini's port along a 1.8-kilometre (1.1-mile) road connection, or would be transferred onto wagons to reach a refinery in Cesena along the standard-gauge Bologna–Ancona railway.

The station building is still extant. It was transformed into a bus station immediately after the line's closure.

=== Novafeltria railway station ===
Until 1941, Novafeltria was known as Mercantino Marecchia. The railway station is still extant, and its locomotive shed is now used by replacement buses. The station included a water tank. Sulphur was transported to the station from the mines at Perticara along a cableway, which measured 6 kilometres (3.7 miles) in length and was built in 1922.

=== Intermediate stations ===
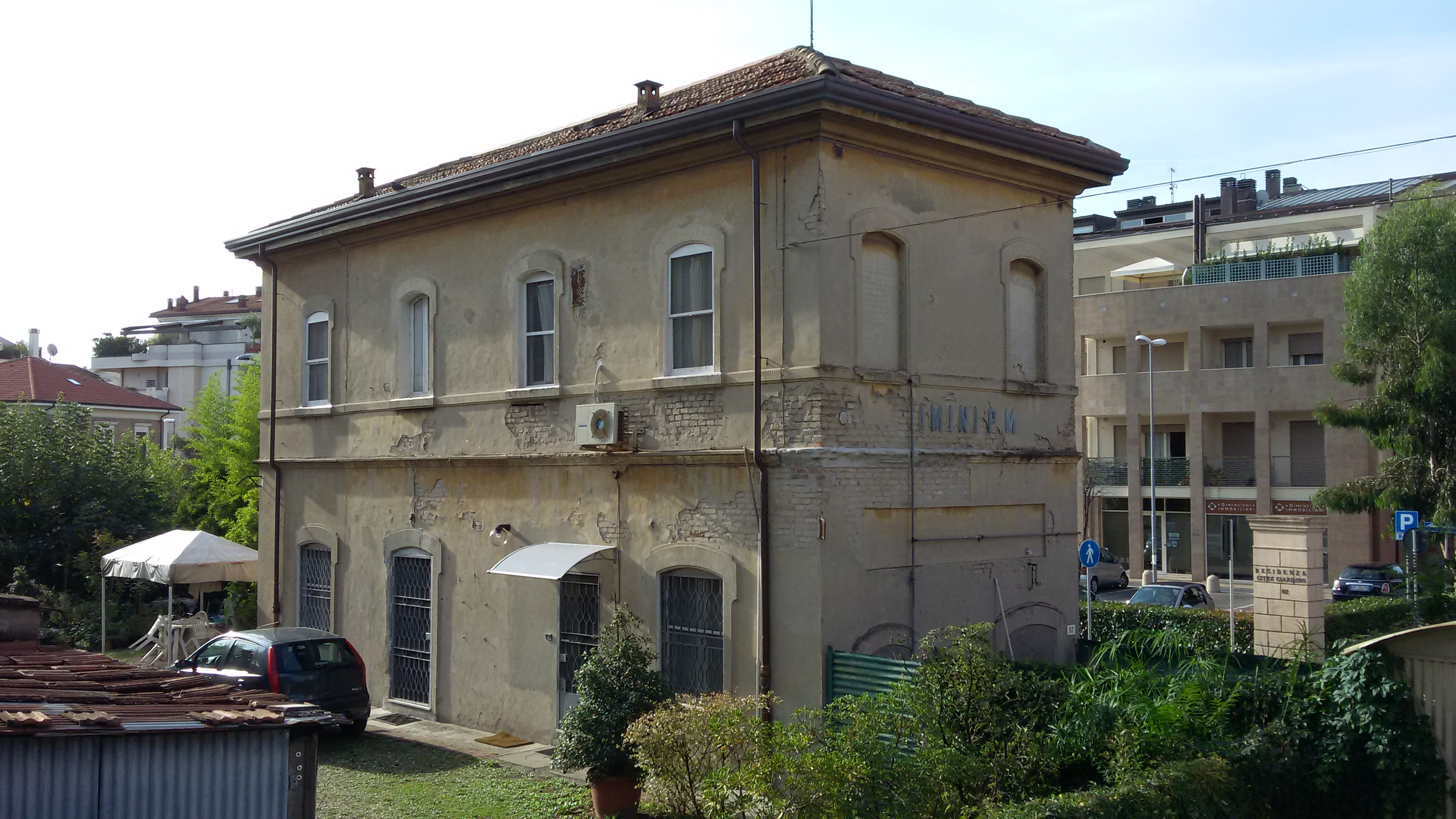
The station building of Rimini Porta Montanara, September 2015

The intermediate stations, from Rimini Centrale, were: Rimini Porta Montanara, Fornaci, Spadarolo, Vergiano, Casale Sarzana, Sant'Ermete, Corpolò, Villa Verucchio, Verucchio, Dogana, San Marino-Torello, Pietracuta, Bivio San Leo, Ponte Santa Maria Maddalena, Secchiano, and Talamello-Campiano.

Many station buildings are extant, including those of Rimini Porta Montanara (in a state of abandonment), Dogana, and San Marino-Torello. The station buildings of Vergiano, Corpolò, Pietracuta, and Secchiano are extant as residential property.

Fornaci's station building was used by road infrastructure company Anas, but is now abandoned. Anas also used a goods warehouse attached to Dogana railway station. Villa Verucchio's station building is used by buses, while Verucchio's houses a United Nations research centre.
