= Geography of San Marino =

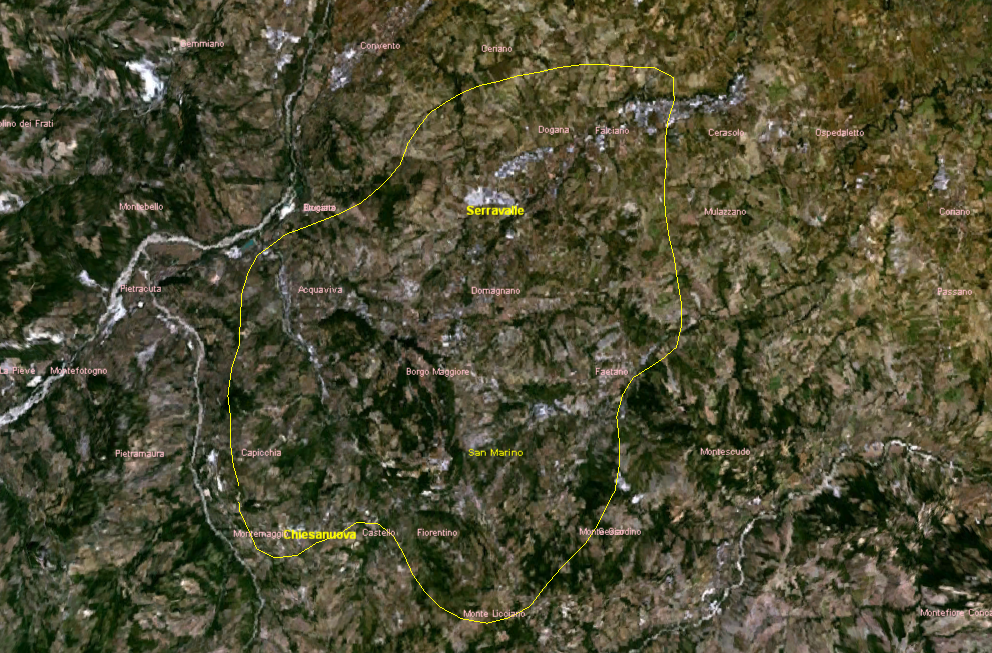
- Continent: Europe
- Region: Southern Europe
- Coordinates: 43°56′N 12°26′E
- Area
  - Total: 61 km^{2} (24 sq mi)
- Coastline: 0 km (0 mi)
- Highest point: Monte Titano, 749 m
- Lowest point: Ausa River, 55 m
- Longest river: San Marino River
- Climate: Humid subtropical climate

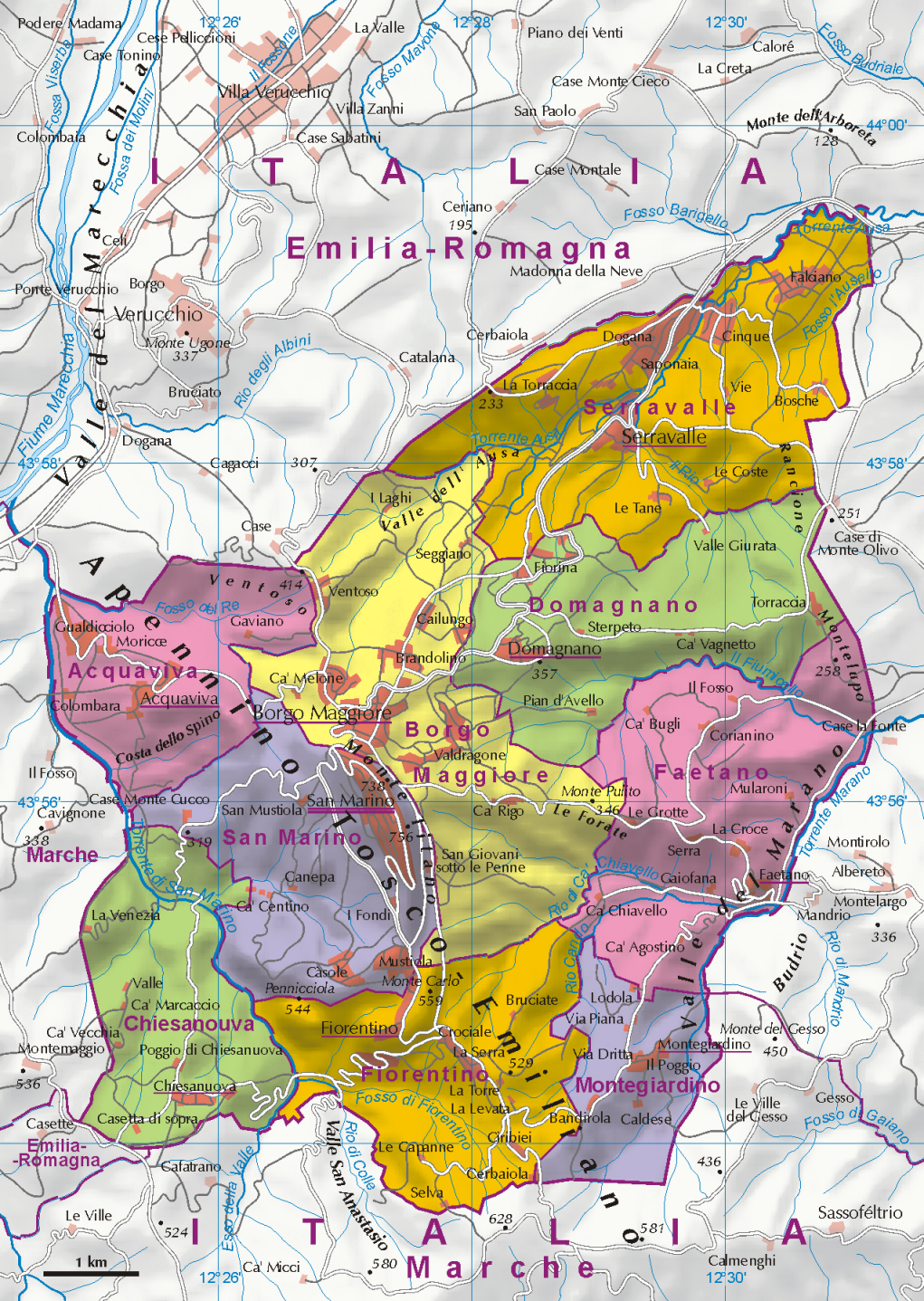
A map of San Marino

San Marino is located in Southern Europe, an enclave (landlocked) in central Italy, which it borders for 39 km. The third smallest independent state by area in Europe after the Vatican City and Monaco, San Marino is dominated by the Apennines. Located at 43.94°N 12.46°E, it covers an area of 61.2 km^{2} (23.6 sq mi). Completely mountainous, only 17% of its territory is arable. Several rivers flow through the country, the largest being the Ausa, the Marano, and the San Marino River.

== Climate ==
The climate of San Marino is a humid subtropical climate (Köppen climate classification: Cfa), with continental influences, having warm summers and cool winters that are typical of inland areas of the central Italian peninsula. Snowfalls are common and heavy almost every winter, especially above 400–500 m (1,300–1,600 feet) of altitude.

== Political geography ==
San Marino is divided into 9 castelli, or municipalities. They are:

- Acquaviva
- Borgo Maggiore
- Chiesanuova
- Domagnano
- Faetano
- Fiorentino
- Montegiardino
- City of San Marino (Città di San Marino), the capital town
- Serravalle

== Protected areas ==
San Marino has no protected areas as of November, 2016. San Marino is defined as a Global 200 Ecoregions. San Marino has no threatened or endangered species.

=== International law ===
San Marino gave credence to and accepted the Convention on International Trade in Endangered Species of Wild Fauna and Flora, adheres to the International Convention for the Regulation of Whaling, and ratified the World Heritage Convention. They are members of International Maritime Organization and IPCC. They are signatories to the Convention on Biological Diversity.

=== Domestic law ===
While San Marino has no official protected areas, it has a law prohibiting the cutting down of any tree over 10 centimetres (3.9 in) in diameter, meaning that most trees within the country are legally protected. Under the FRA 2010 Categorization of Forests, all of the land area of San Marino is considered "Other land", with none being "Forest" or "Other wooded land". Despite the fact that 16% of the country is woodlands, predominantly of oaks and other broadleaves as Quercus pubescens, Fraxinus ornus, Ostrya carpinifolia, Acer obtusatum, Quercus cerris, Quercus ilex, Populus nigra, Salix alba. Shrublands and similar lands are dominated by Crataegus monogyna, Cornus sanguinea, Spartium junceum, Rubus ulmifolius, Rosa canina, Prunus spinosa, Quercus pubescens, Fraxinus ornus and Ulmus minor cover the 17%. Badlands are only 4% of the country, and less than 1% is covered by rivers.
