= Arch of Augustus (Rimini) =

Monument in Rimini, Italy

- Arco d'Augusto
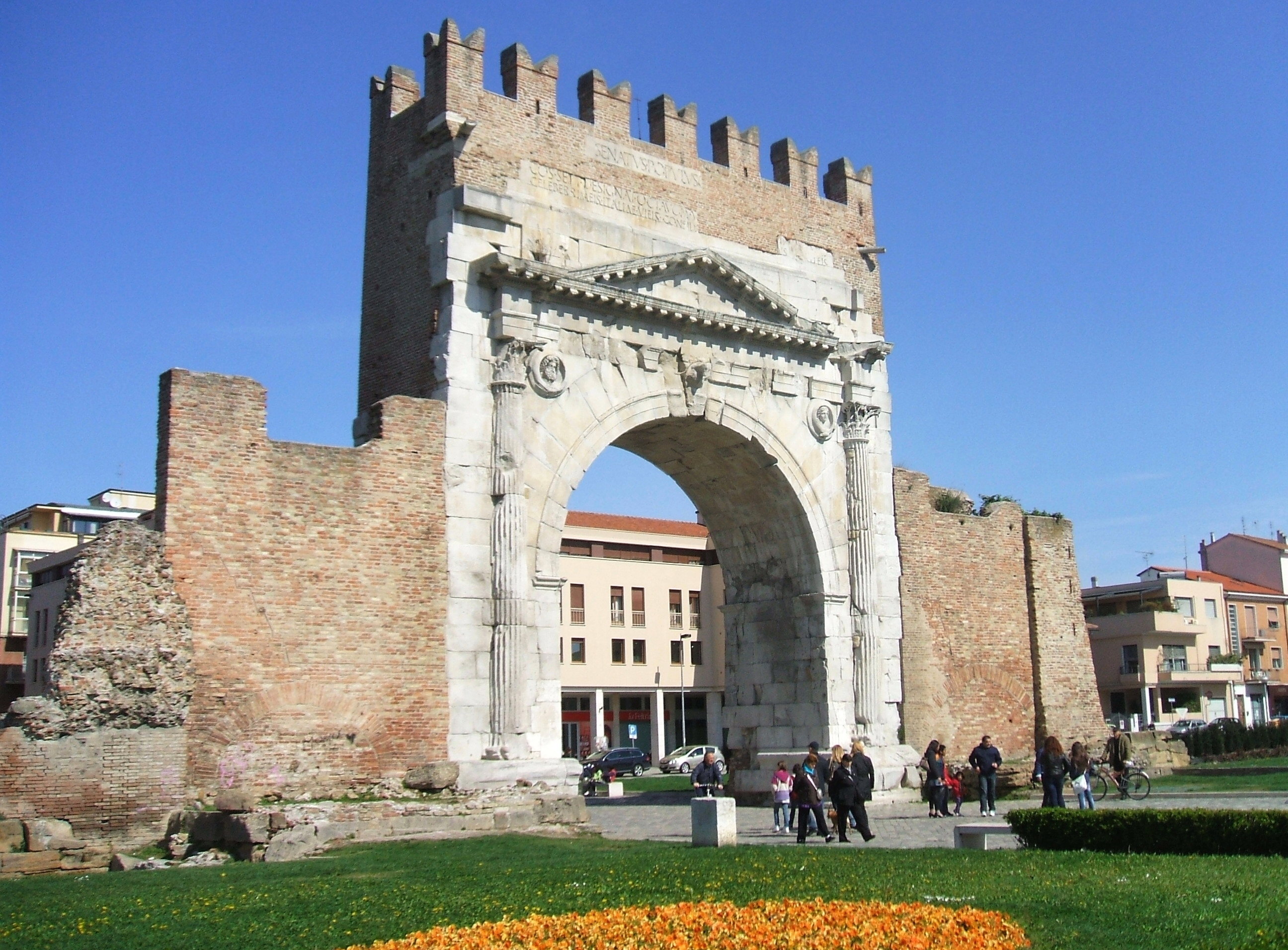
- The Arch of Augustus in April 2012
- Interactive map of the Arch of Augustus area
- Former names: Gate of Saint Gaudentius

General information
- Type: City gate and triumphal arch
- Location: Corso d'Augusto, Rimini, Emilia-Romagna, Italy
- Coordinates: 44°03′24.83″N 12°34′16.17″E
- Named for: Gaius Julius Caesar Augustus
- Year built: 27 BC

Height
- Height: 19 metres (62 feet)

Dimensions
- Other dimensions: 15 metres (49 feet) (width); 4.1 metres (13 feet) (depth)

Technical details
- Material: Istrian stone

The Arch of Augustus (Italian: Arco d'Augusto, Romagnol: l’Èrc d’Augóst) is a gate set in the former city wall of Rimini, Emilia-Romagna, in the form of an ancient Roman triumphal arch.

Built in 27 BC in honour of Augustus, the first Roman emperor, the arch marks the northern end of the Via Flaminia, the road between Ariminum (Rimini) and Rome constructed in 220 BC by Gaius Flaminius. Under Fascist Italy, the adjoining city walls and surrounding buildings were demolished, leaving the Arch of Augustus to stand as an isolated monument.

The Arch of Augustus is the oldest preserved triumphal arch in Italy. Along with the Ponte di Tiberio, it is one of Rimini's most-recognised symbols, and is represented on the city's coat of arms. Because of the city's location at the tip of a strategically-important north–south passage by the Adriatic Sea, many armies have passed through the Arch of Augustus, leading Antonio Paolucci to describe the Arch of Augustus as "the eye of Italy's needle".

== History ==
=== Antiquity ===
The arch was built in 27 BC, commissioned by the Roman Senate in honour of Augustus, who had become the first Roman emperor in the same year. It was built at the northern end of the Via Flaminia, a Roman road between Ariminum (modern Rimini) and Rome constructed in 220 BC by Gaius Flaminius, and at the start of Ariminum's decumanus maximus (Corso d'Augusto). The arch is functionally a city gate, and scholars deny that it was intended as a triumphal arch. The arch's construction coincided with a restoration of the Via Flaminia and the renaming of Ariminum as Colonia Augusta Ariminensis, leading the city to be associated with Augustus, a legacy that would be consolidated with the Ponte d'Augusto, completed in 21 AD, after Augustus' death, at the other end of the decumanus maximus. Outside the city walls, the arch led to a two-arched bridge onto the river Aprusa (Ausa), which was likely Augustan in origin, and repaired in late antiquity, the Middle Ages, and in the 17th and 18th centuries; it was expanded in the 1930s. The buildings near the arch were among the most elegantly-decorated of Ariminum.

The arch likely replaced an earlier gate about which little is known. The earlier gate would have been buried in thick cement. At its inauguration, the Arch of Augustus was flanked on either side by square defensive guard towers built at the time of Ariminum's foundation in 268 BC. Excavations in the 1980s recovered coins suggesting that the earliest yellow sandstone walls surrounding the arch dated to the 3rd century BC. In the 3rd century AD, the sandstone walls were supplanted by stone walls fitted with drainage arches. In the final phase of construction, sometime between the 3rd and 7th centuries, the original towers were replaced with seven-sided stone towers. These towers had a brick centre, composed of stone chippings mixed with mortar, and an outer stone casing. They are popularly attributed to the redesign of the city's urban fortifications under emperor Aurelian, and likely reached the height of the arch before being raised in later centuries.

From at least the third century, defensive gates were built immediately in front of and behind the Arch of Augustus. A 1541 report preparing the city for Pope Paul III's visit describes "two arches, one side by side, very ancient and built of large stones, and without much artistry". The fortified gates were likely demolished around the time of the visit, as part of an effort to remove ancient structures that obstructed the view of the Arch of Augustus. Its foundations are believed to be buried and rediscoverable by excavation.

=== Medieval era ===
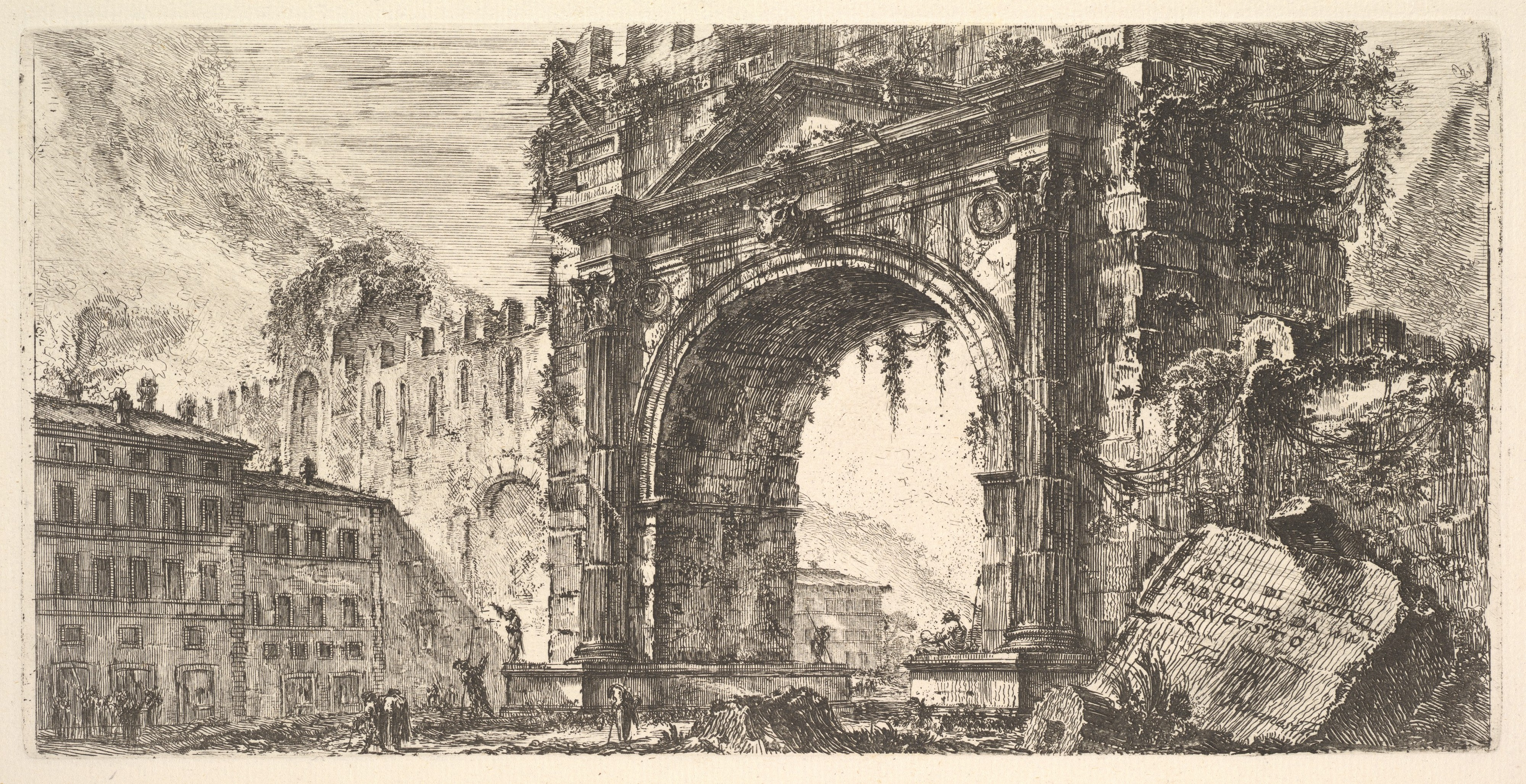
A print of the Arch of Augustus by Giovanni Battista Piranesi, c. 1748

In the Bavarian Code, a codex containing the church of Ravenna's investitures between the 8th and 10th centuries, the Arch of Augustus is called the Gate of Saint Gaudentius, after Gaudentius of Rimini, who was buried in a necropolis outside the city's walls.

Following the erection of new outer walls under Frederick II, the arch's military function declined from the mid-13th century. A medieval gate was built outside the Arch of Augustus, known as the Porta Romana (or the Gate of Saint Genesio or Saint Bartolo). The Porta Romana was destroyed after being seriously damaged by an earthquake in 1786.

According to Cesare Clementini, after briefly recapturing the city, Pandolfo IV Malatesta tried "to cut down the superb Arch of Augustus" during his retreat from Rimini in January 1528, when the arrival of troops from the Papal States under the command of Odet of Foix, Viscount of Lautrec, marked the definitive end of Rimini's Malatestan rule.

=== Modern era ===
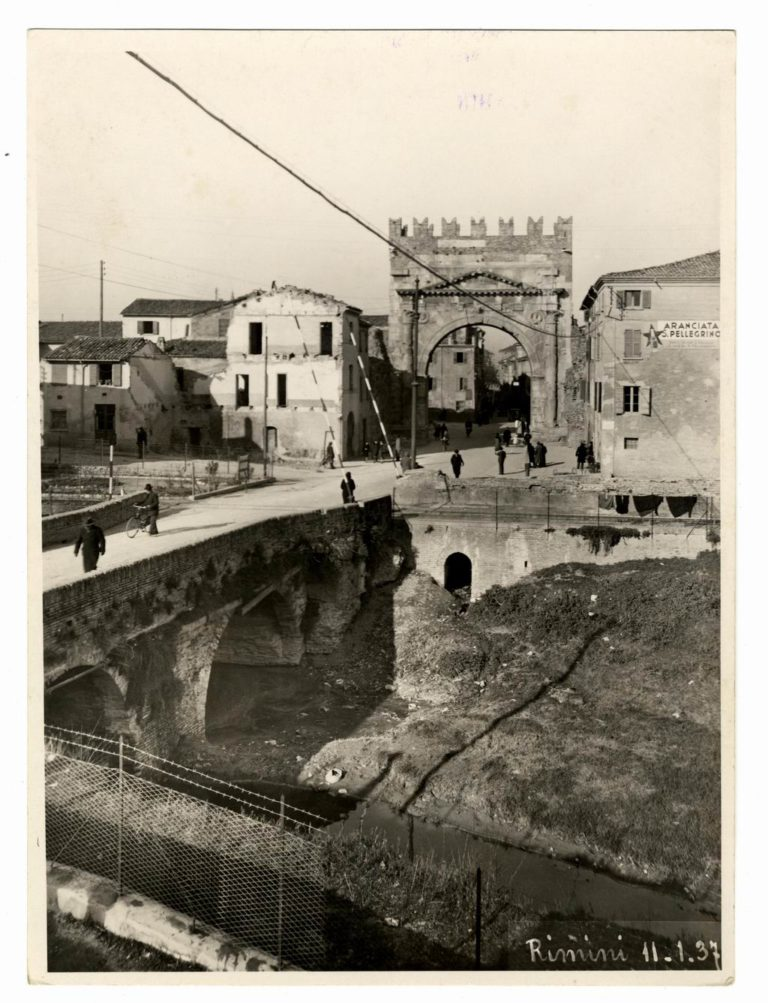
The Arch of Augustus in a 1937 photograph, before the isolation works, with the Ausa river and the level crossing with the Rimini–Novafeltria railway in front of it

On 9 January 1846, Luigi Tonini led a series of archaeological excavations at the base of the arch's flanking towers. The excavations confirmed that the Arch of Augustus was inserted amid existing city walls. Restoration work in 1912 restored the inscription on the arch's battlement. The arch was damaged in the 1916 Rimini earthquakes; some merlons fell in both the 16 May and 17 August earthquakes.

Between 1916 and 1960, the Rimini–Novafeltria railway passed in front of the arch, adjacent to the Ausa; the railway crossed the Via Flaminia through an incongruous level crossing. As well as passengers, the railway transported sulphur. For its proximity to pedestrians and road vehicles in Rimini's city centre, the railway was considered structurally dangerous and impractical.

Between 1937 and 1939, the buildings adjacent to the arch were demolished. By this time, the area around the arch was known as "one of the oldest, dirtiest, and unhealthy neighbourhoods of the city", with poor sanitation. Benito Mussolini, Italy's fascist dictator, donated 500,000 lire towards the works. On the afternoon of 13 August 1936, Mussolini symbolically struck the first blow of the works with a pickaxe. The isolation works were envisaged as part of the creation of an "imperial road" between the city centre and the new Stadio Romeo Neri (Viale Silvio Pellico), and representing it as a triumphal arch served the political and ideological propaganda of Fascist Italy as successors to the Roman Empire. The cost was 1.05 million lire, of a total of 10.3 million lire for the neighbourhood's redevelopment. Though the isolation works were intended to highlight the arch's monumental nature, it facilitated its treatment by Rimini's urban city planners as a traffic island in later decades.

The isolation works included the demolition of the flanking towers, which were already in a state of advanced deterioration. Only some casing of the eastern tower remains visible today. The isolation works revealed that the arch was attached to the city walls on both sides.

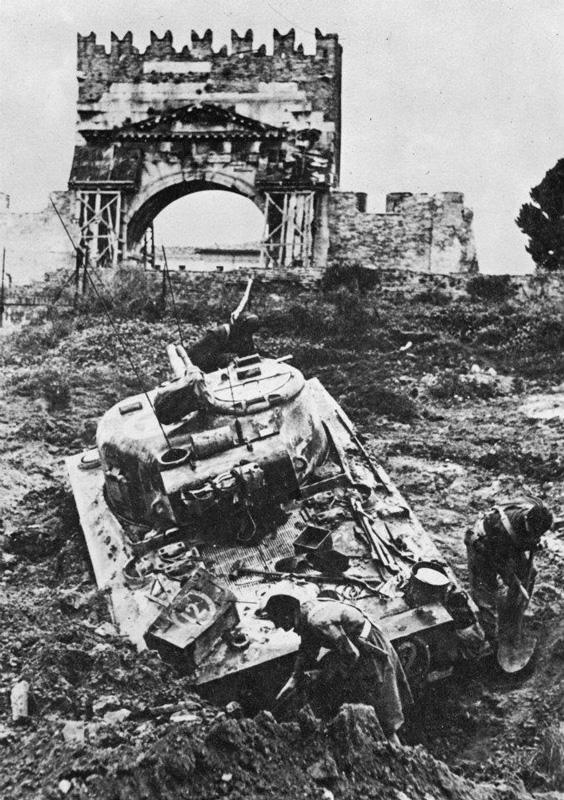
The Arch of Augustus after the Battle of Rimini, c. 1944

In the Second World War, during the Battle of Rimini, the Arch of Augustus narrowly avoided destruction by the retreating German forces: Marshal Willi Trageser of the 2nd Parachute Division defied orders from Lieutenant Kenneth Renberg to blow up the monument to slow down the advancing Allied forces. Trageser said after the war:

I personally gave the order not to blow up the arch, taking full responsibility for it. It seemed absurd to me to destroy a historical monument of this kind to achieve no result, given that the arch was isolated in the middle of a square and, therefore, traffic could have continued perfectly well, both to the right and left of the monument itself.

— Marshal Willi Trageser

It was through the Arch of Augustus that the 2nd Battalion of the 3rd Greek Mountain Brigade entered Rimini on the morning of 21 September. After Rimini's liberation, the Arch of Augustus faced further threats of demolition: firstly, by British technicians, who wanted to use the arch's stones to repave destroyed roads; and secondly, by a company of engineers from South Africa and the Mauritius, who mistook the Arch of Augustus for Rimini's Porta Montanara, which they were ordered to destroy to allow vehicles to pass through the city. Local historian Amedeo Montemaggi pieced together Trageser's work in saving the monument, after which Rimini's municipal government welcomed Trageser's widow at an event in 1981.

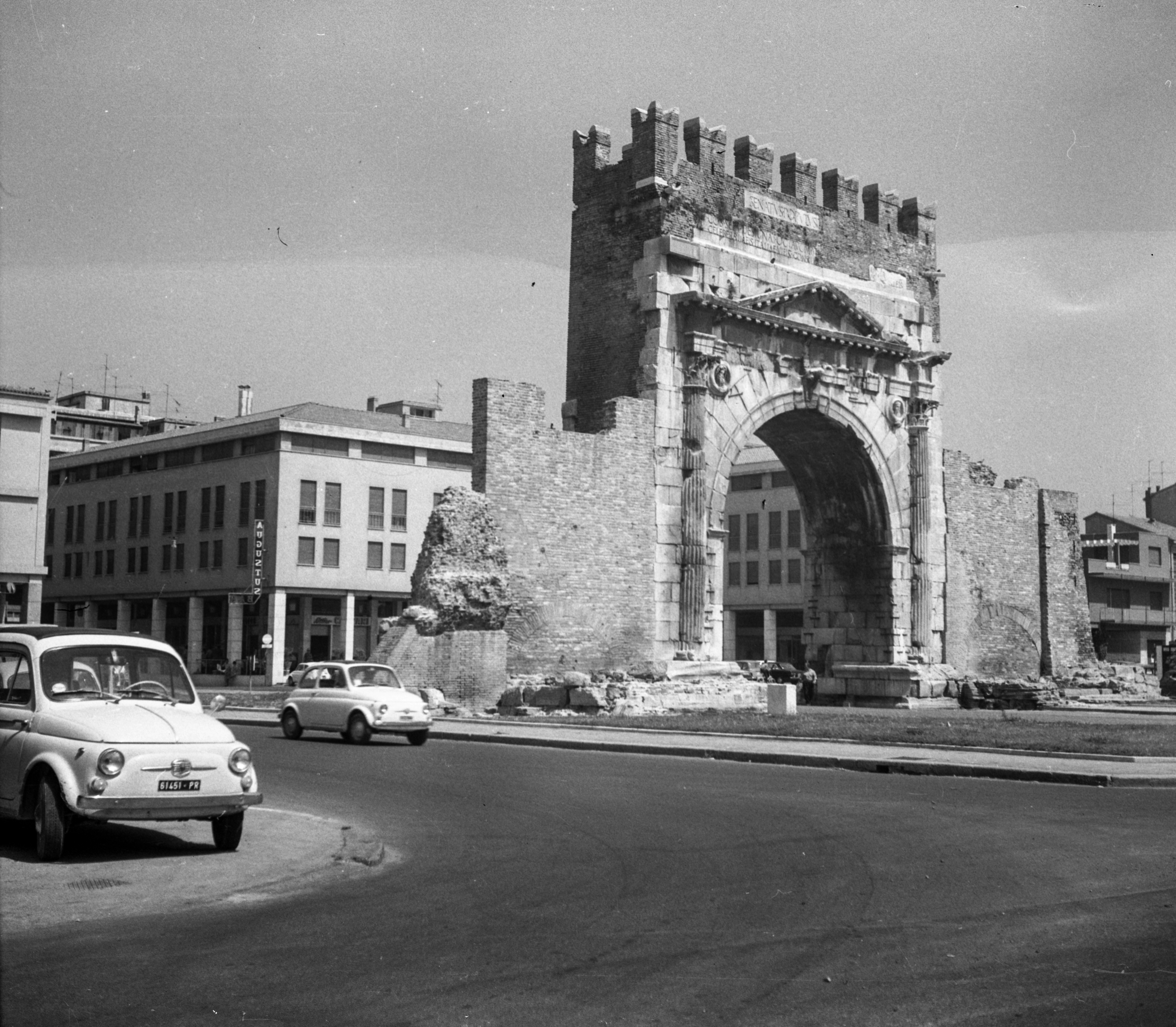
The Arch of Augustus as a traffic island, 1972

Until the 1950s, the arch was accessible to vehicles. In 1972, the Ausa's diversion into the Marecchia was completed, allowing the redevelopment of its former riverbed in front of the Arch of Augustus. The Roman bridge was replaced with an underpass, and the arch became the centre of a traffic island.

From 1997, the car parks surrounding the arch were redeveloped into green spaces and urban gardens. The arch and surrounding area were the subject of redevelopment works in 2002.

Beginning on 10 October 2022, a restoration project eliminated weeds on the arch and applied a protective anti-graffiti coating on the lower parts. The restoration cost €40,000, three-quarters of which came from the archaeological superintendency for the provinces of Ravenna and Forlì-Cesena, and the remaining quarter of which came from Rimini's municipal government. The restoration was completed on 28 November 2022.

== Appearance ==
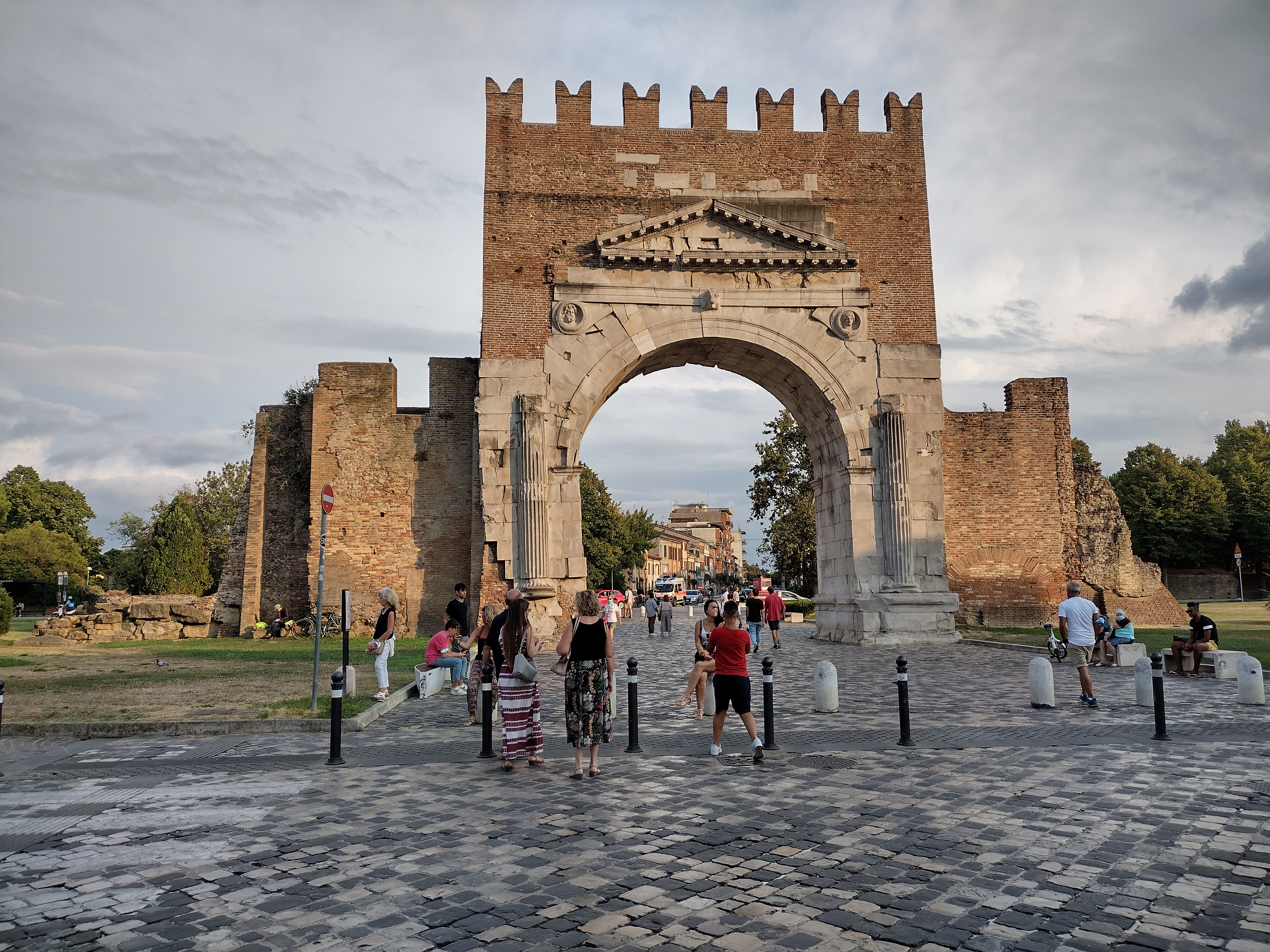
The inside face, August 2021

The arch measures 19 metres (62 feet) in height and 15 metres (49 feet) in width. Its external covering is in Istrian stone, while its centre is composed of rocks, stones, and pebbles bound with mortar.

The arch's base and opening are Italic or Etruscan in design, contrasting with the late Hellenistic design of the upper decorations. The fusion of these designs may have epitomised the transition of power from the Roman Senate who commissioned the arch to the emperor whom the arch glorifies.

Despite its elaborate decorations, scholars deny that it was built as a triumphal arch, and its isolation as a monument in the late 1930s was motivated by the political and ideological motivations of the fascist government.

=== Opening and keystone ===
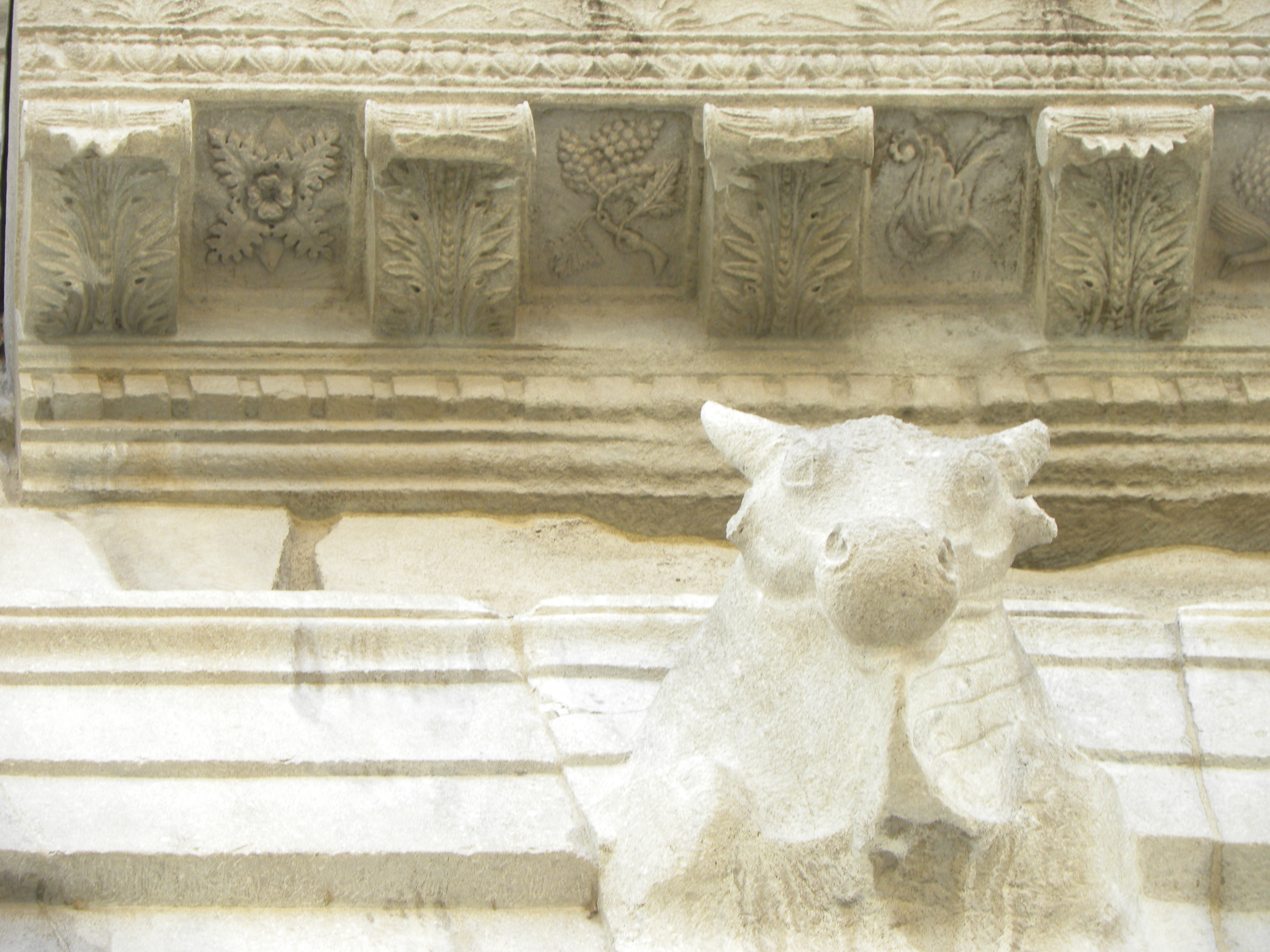
Keystone bull, and underside of the cornice, September 2015

The arch's opening spans 8.84 metres (29.0 feet) across. It is 10.4 metres (34 feet) in height, with a depth of 4.1 metres (13 feet). The arch's keystone on each side holds a projecting bull's mouth. While it is often interpreted to represent the strength and power of Rome, the bull is uncommon among symbols of ancient Rome. Alternative hypotheses propose that the bull represents the rule of man over nature, one of several Roman legions connected to Augustus, a purificatory rite symbolising the gate's sacredness, or an early symbol of Ariminum as a colonia. Another hypothesis suggests that it represents Taurus or Dionysus, protector of Mark Antony, whom Augustus defeated.

The arch's large size would have made inserted doors impractical, symbolising the Pax Romana, a period of relative peace and order inaugurated by Augustus. The symbolism would have been particularly important given Rimini's proximity to the Rubicon, infamous for the crossing of Julius Caesar, which precipiated Caesar's civil war. In a local Romagnol idiom, someone undertaking a senseless and impossible ambition is said to want to make a door in the arch (e vliva fé la porta ma l'Èrc), but whether the arch ever had a door inserted is contested among local historians.

=== Columns and pediment ===
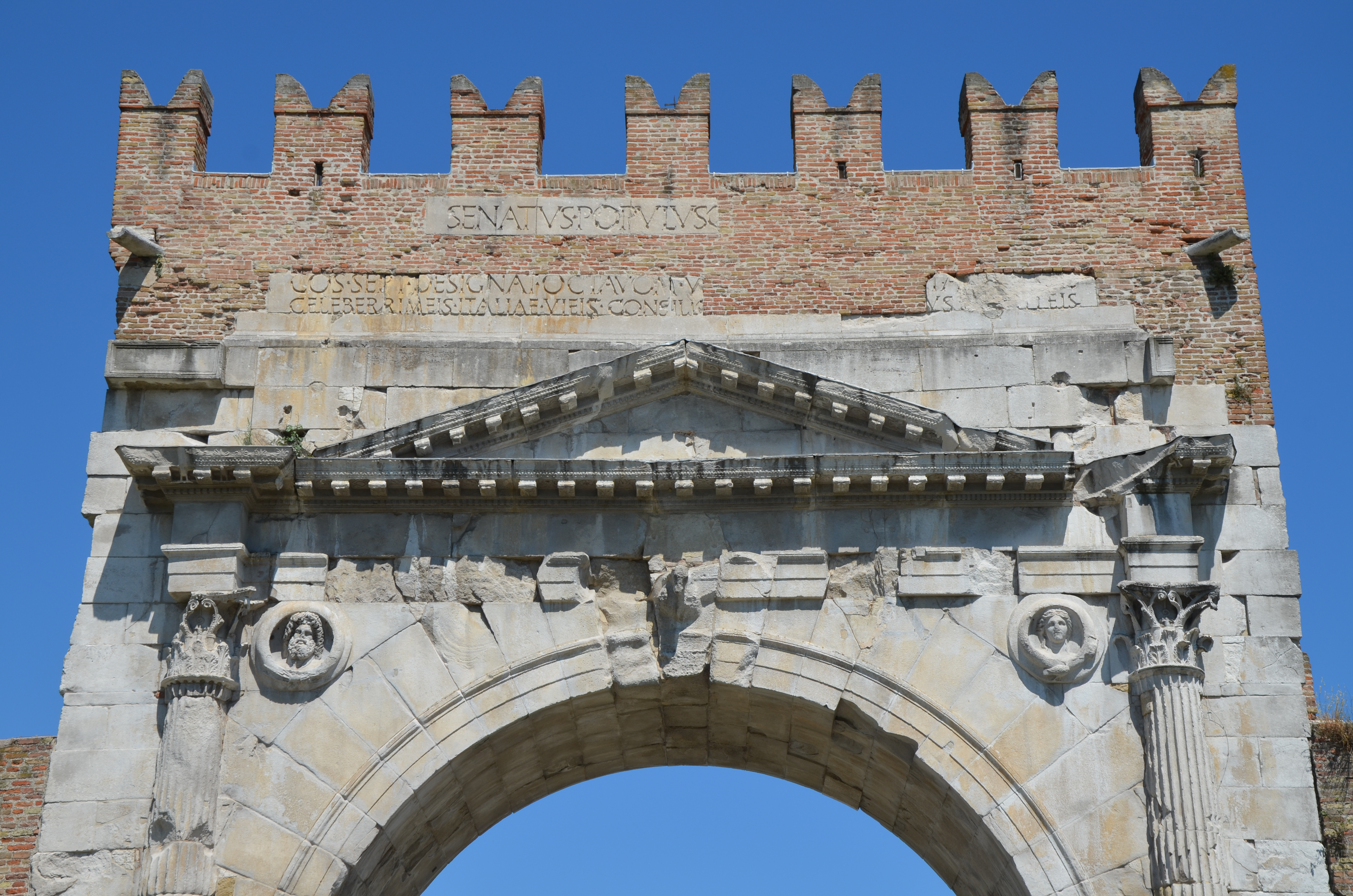
Upper parts, June 2015

The arch's opening is flanked by two engaged columns with fluted shafts and Corinthian capitals. Four clipei (shields) in the spandrels between the column and opening depict Roman divinities. On the arch's outside face, Jupiter is represented on the right with a bolt of lightning and eagle, and Apollo on the left with a lyre and raven. Facing the city, Neptune is represented on the right with a trident and dolphin, and a final goddess – variously interpreted as Venus, Minerva or Roma – is represented on the left with a sword and trophy. Ariminum had a well-documented cult of Apollo, while Neptune recalled the city's maritime importance. The four divinities recall the classical elements of earth (the disputed goddess), water (Neptune), air (Apollo), and fire (Jupiter), thereby manifesting Augustus' political power over nature and religion.

Above the opening, there is a rather low triangular pediment. The pediment does not extend to cover the tops of the columns, but is "poised uneasily between them". The cornice and tympanum feature projections whose undersides are decorated with engravings and sculptures of flowers and plants, a hippocampus, a griffin, and jellyfish.

=== Battlement ===
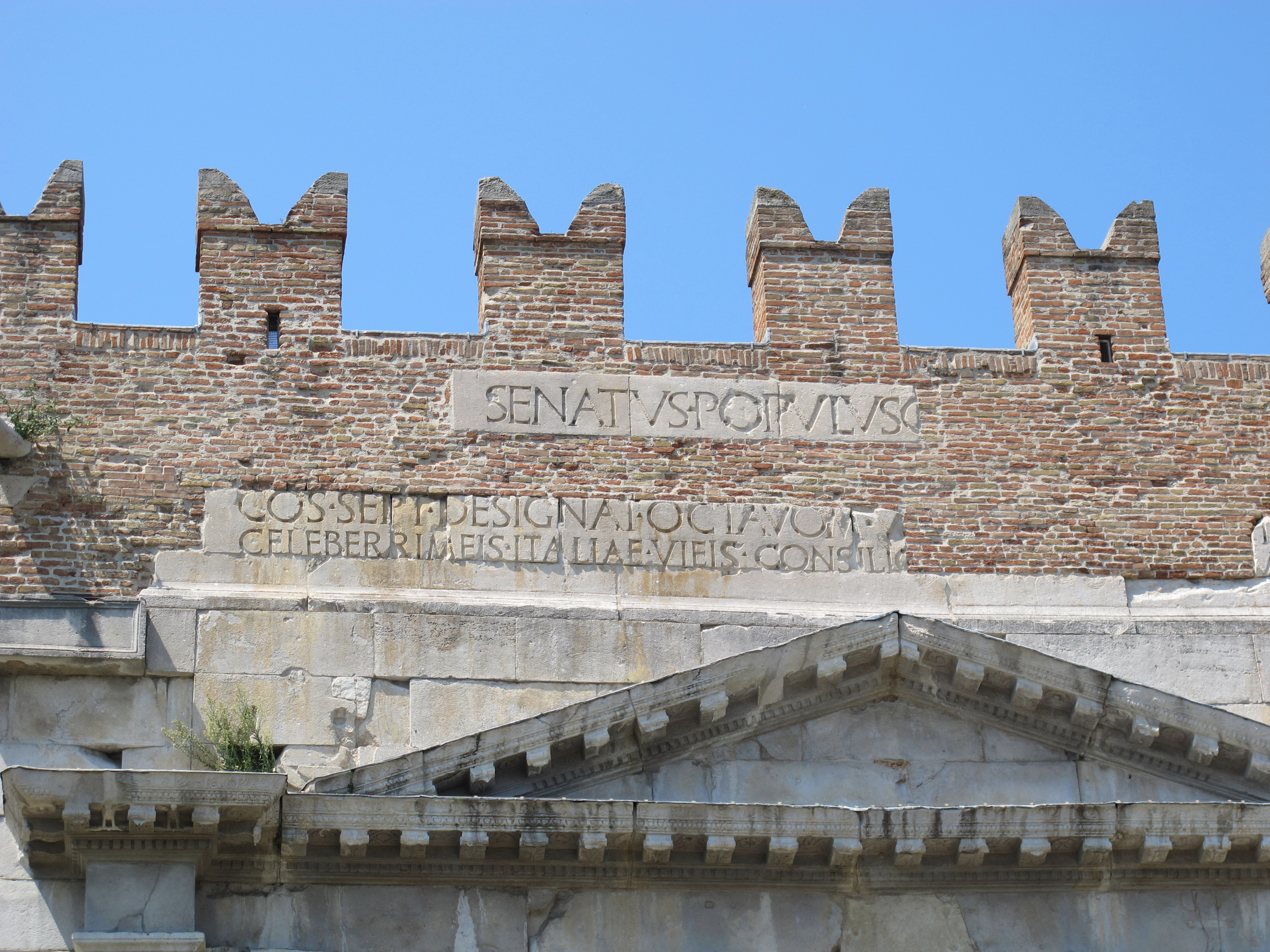
Detail of the battlement and the inscription, September 2013

Originally, the arch would have been surmounted by an attic. According to Cassius Dio, above the attic would have been a statue of Augustus, likely on horseback or driving a quadriga. Two artworks have been hypothesised as part of the statue: a foot of white marble that Abbot Giovanni Battista Gervasoni Angelini said was found near the battlement, which passed into the collections of Giovanni Bianchi; and a horse's head, which shows signs of gilded bridles, indicating a possible chariot.

An alternative hypothesis by local historian Danilo Re proposes that the arch was topped by the Cartoceto Bronzes, an ensemble of ancient Roman gilt bronzes discovered in 1946 near Pergola, along the Via Flaminia, which Re suggests may have represented Caesar, Augustus, Augustus' mother, and Augustus' grandmother.

The merlons above the arch, with their distinctive Ghibelline form, were added in the late medieval era. The oldest extant merlons likely date to the 13th century.

=== Inscription ===
Detail of the inscription on the battlement of the Arch of Augustus
Latin inscription	English translation
SENATVS POPVLVSQVE ROMANVS IMPERATORI CAESARI DIVI IVLI FILIO AVGVSTO IMPERATORI SEPTEM; CONSOLI SEPTEM DESIGNATO OCTAVOM VIA FLAMINIA ET RELIQVEIS CELEBERRIMEIS ITALIAE VIEIS ET AVCTORITATE EIVS MVNITEIS	The Senate and People of Rome [dedicated this arch] to Imperator Caesar Augustus, son of the divine Julius, Imperator seven times, Consul seven times and consul-elect for an eighth time, on account of the via Flaminia and the other very distinguished roads of Italy having been repaired by his auctoritas.

== Depictions and legacy ==
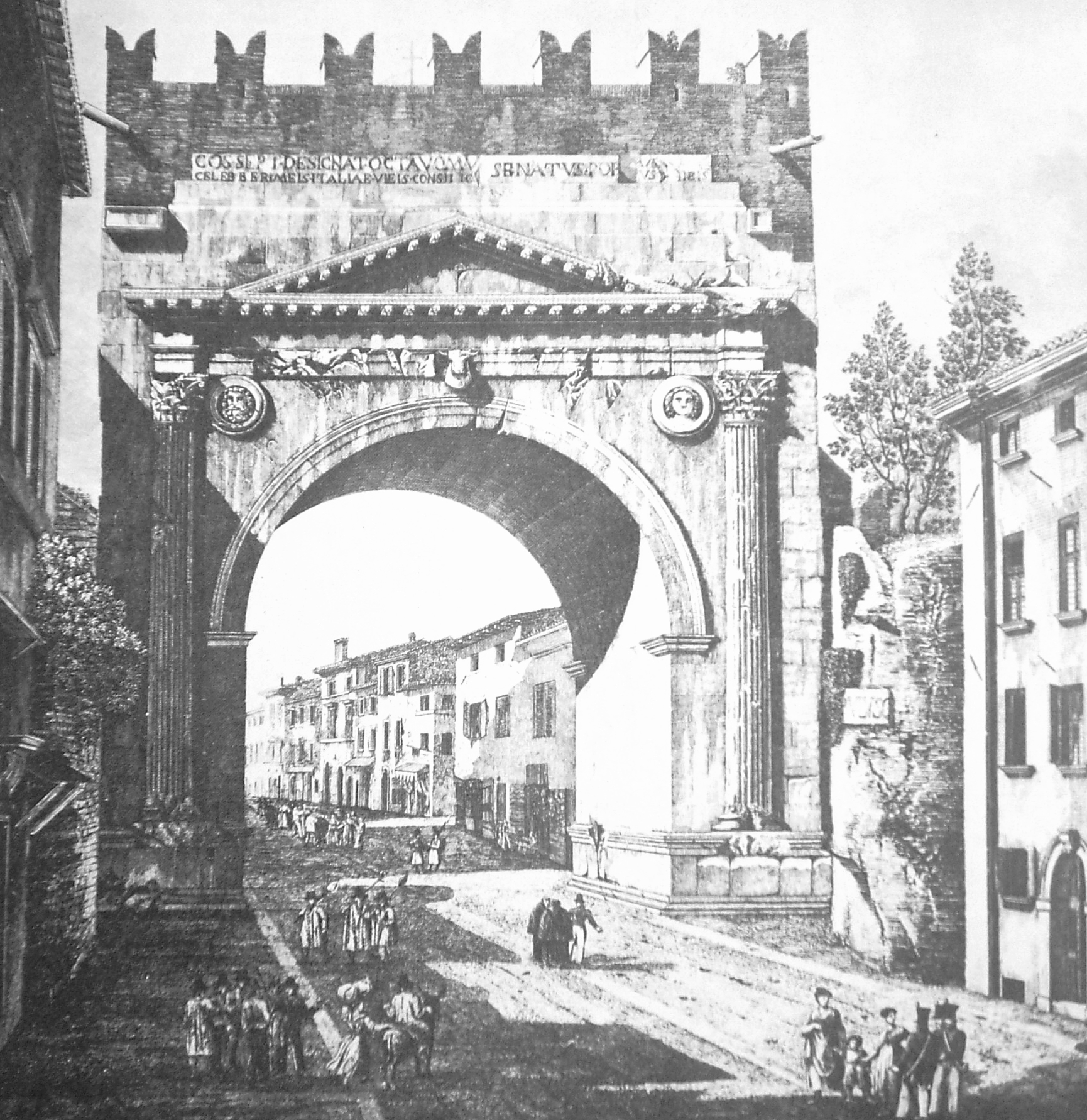
Luigi Rossini's sketch of the Arch of Augustus (1836) unusually depicted the buildings neighbouring the arch, which other artists typically omitted in favour of the ancient city walls.

The Arch of Augustus has often been drawn alongside the Ponte di Tiberio, with which it is represented on Rimini's coat of arms. The arch was well known in the Renaissance, and it likely influenced the never-completed façade of the nearby Tempio Malatestiano, designed in 1450 by Leon Battista Alberti. Some scholars contend that the Castel del Monte shares architectural references with the arch.

Among the oldest artistic depictions of the arch is a seal, of contested authenticity, which records the late-medieval Ghibelline merlons. A cross-shape inside the arch may indicate a double door. While Tonini dated the seal to the beginning of the tenth century, Gaetano Battaglini suggested that it dates to the 13th century for its familiarity with seals of neighbouring cities.

In 1526, Antonio da Sangallo the Younger drew a sketch of the arch for an inspection of the Papal States, who had acquired Rimini. Other notable depictions of the arch include those of Florent Fidèle Constant Bourgeois in 1806, Prosper Barbot in 1821, and Luigi Rossini in 1836. Classical depictions present the arch's outside face, and typically omitted any adjacent houses in favour of the ancient city walls. 18th-century engravings often included an obelisk that was located near the arch inside the city.

== See also ==
- Arch of Augustus (disambiguation) for other such arches
- List of Roman triumphal arches
