= Alpe della Luna =

Mountain in Italy

Coordinates: 43°39′N 12°10′E

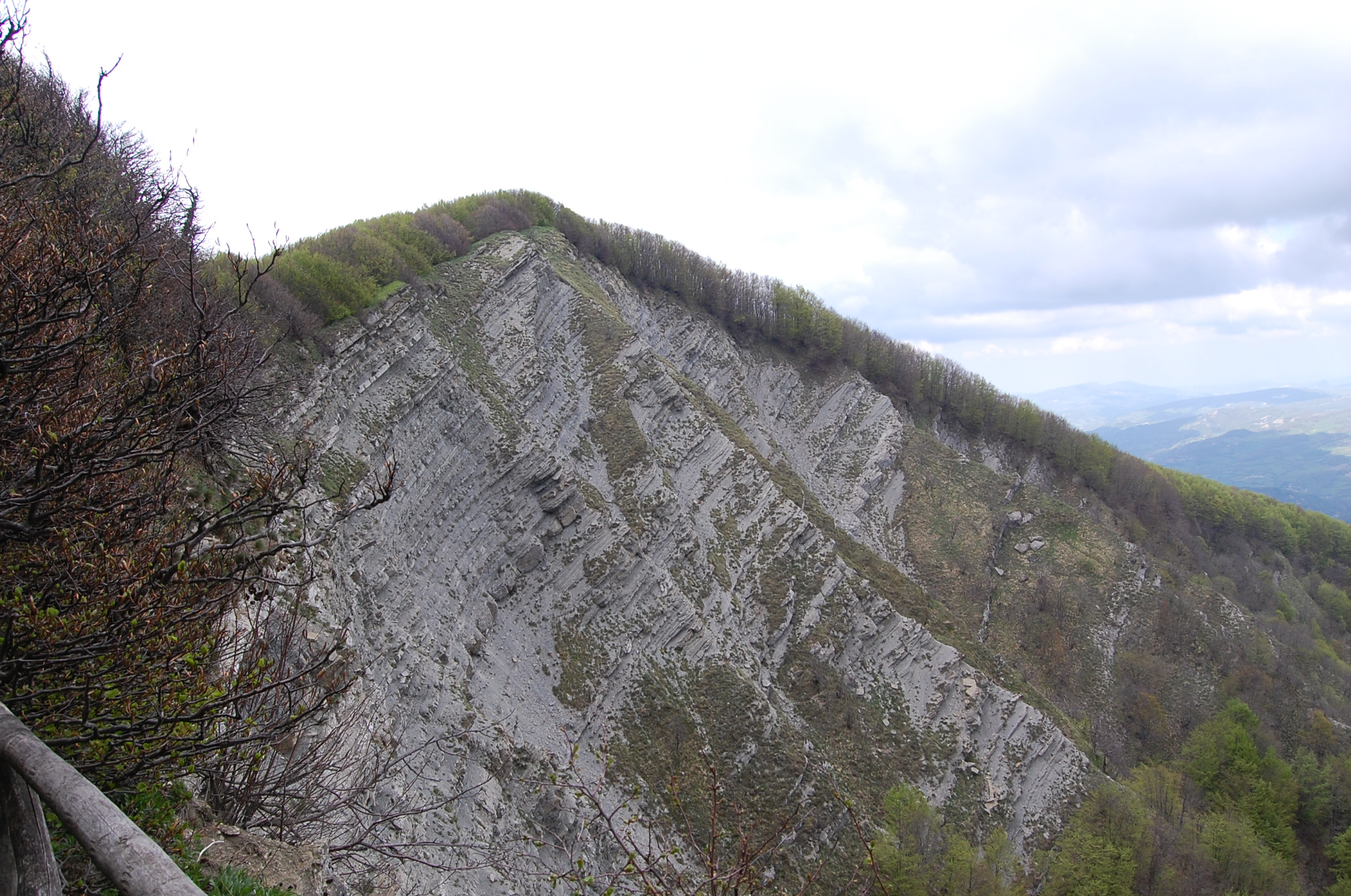
Ripa della Luna.

The Alpe della Luna ("Alp of the Moon") is a mountain massif in the northern Apennine Mountains of central Italy. It is situated across the boundaries of Tuscany, Marche, Umbria. It is part of Appennino tosco-romagnolo. Its highest peaks are the Monte dei Frati, at 1,453 m above sea level, and Monte Maggiore (1,384 m). The sources of the Metauro, Marecchia (on the Adriatic Sea-facing slopes) and Tiber River tributaries (on the Tyrrhenian Sea side) are located in the massif area.

The Alpe della Luna is composed mostly of marlstone and sandstone. The wildlife is that typical of the Apennines.

On the site of Montecasale is an old monastery visited several times by Saint Francis of Assisi. In the same area is the monastery of Fragaiolo. This area was attended by Saint Anthony of Padua too.
