= Porta Montanara, Rimini =

Monument in Rimini, Italy

Porta Montanara
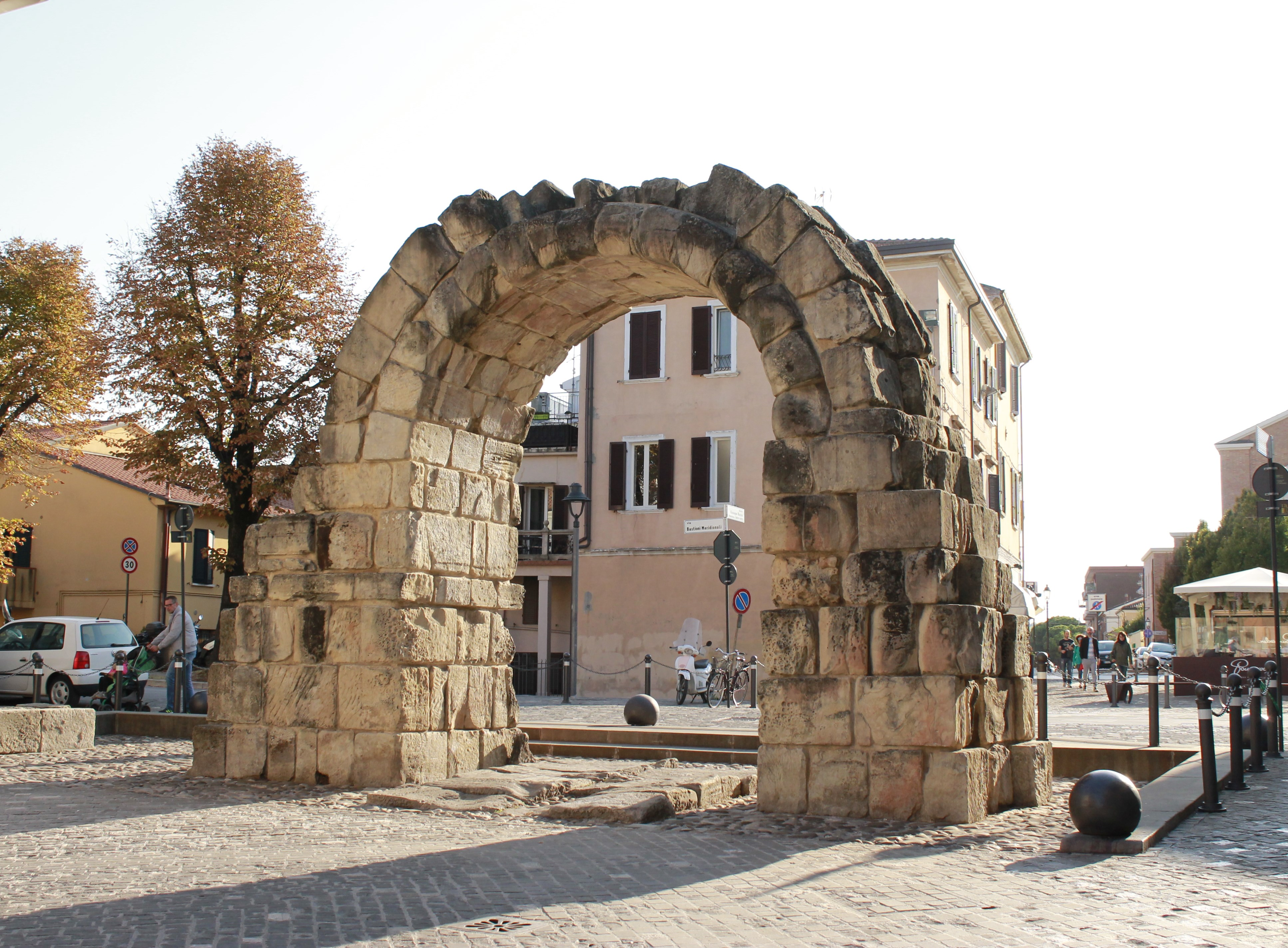
- The inside face of Porta Montanara in September 2018
- Interactive map of the Porta Montanara area
- Former names: Porta Sant'Andrea
- Etymology: lit. 'Mountain gate' (from Italian)

General information
- Type: City gate
- Location: Via Giuseppe Garibaldi, Rimini, Emilia-Romagna, Italy
- Coordinates: 44°03′26.25″N 12°33′54.77″E
- Year built: c. 82 BC
- Renovated: 1946 (consolidated); 1949–50 (relocated); 1979 (relocated); 2003–04 (relocated)

Height
- Height: 5.9 metres (19 feet)

Dimensions
- Other dimensions: 6.65 metres (21.8 feet) (width); 2.2 metres (7.2 feet) (depth)

Technical details
- Material: Sandstone

Porta Montanara (lit. 'mountain gate'), historically known as Porta Sant'Andrea, is an ancient Roman city gate in the city of Rimini, in the region of Emilia-Romagna, northern Italy.

Built after Sulla's civil war in the first century BC, the original construction comprised two arches. The north-facing arch was walled as early as the first or second century AD, and incorporated into a medieval cellar. It was uncovered by Allied aerial bombardment during the Second World War. After Rimini's liberation, the south-facing arch was destroyed by the occupying Allied forces to facilitate the passage of tanks through the city. In 1949, the remaining arch was deconstructed and reassembled in the courtyard of the Tempio Malatestiano. After moving a few metres in 1979, Porta Montanara was restored near its original location in 2004, at the southern end of Rimini's cardo maximus, on the road to the valley of the Marecchia.

== History ==
=== Antiquity and medieval era ===
Porta Montanara was constructed in the first century BC. Its construction is attributed to the city's fortification after Sulla's civil war. The Roman colonia of Ariminum (modern-day Rimini) was initially controlled by Sulla's opponents, and briefly sheltered Gnaeus Papirius Carbo in 82 BC. The city was sacked by Sulla's army, requiring the reconstruction of its defensive fortifications. Porta Montanara was located at the southern end of Ariminum's cardo maximus, the principal north–south street (the present-day Via Giuseppe Garibaldi). It provided access to the road to Arretium (modern-day Arezzo) through the valley of the Marecchia, and to settlements in Rimini's hilly hinterland.

The gate originally comprised two arches. It was preceded by a guard courtyard with an internal door. As early as the first or second century AD, the north-facing arch was walled, while the south-facing arch was raised, due to the increase in the street level. In 1085, the gate is recorded as Porta Sant'Andrea, after the nearby church and district, Borgo Sant'Andrea.

In the 15th century, the gate was incorporated into a series of houses, nicknamed the Red Houses (Italian: Le case rosse), that belonged to the House of Malatesta. A passage was built over the gate, and the closed arch was incorporated into the cellars of the Palazzo Turchi. It was through the gates of Porta Sant'Andrea that, on 17 June 1528, the troops of the Papal States entered Rimini, definitively ending Malatesta rule.

=== Modern history ===
With the arrival of the Cisalpine Republic in 1797, the gate was renamed to Porta Montanara (lit. 'mountain gate') to remove its religious connotations. As also happened at the city's other gates, the upper floors of the gate were destroyed by the occupying French troops to house an artillery battery. In the 19th century, the narrowness of the gate led to significant bottlenecks for wagons entering or leaving the city, which were subject to customs checks while passing through. On 6 May 1876, the municipal government debated a motion to demolish the gate, leading some supporters to damage it prematurely with pickaxes. In 1891, it approved works to widen the surrounding area, recognising the arch as "a great embarrassment to free transit, and some peril to passers-by". The works did little to alleviate congestion, and the arch remained unpopular among local residents.

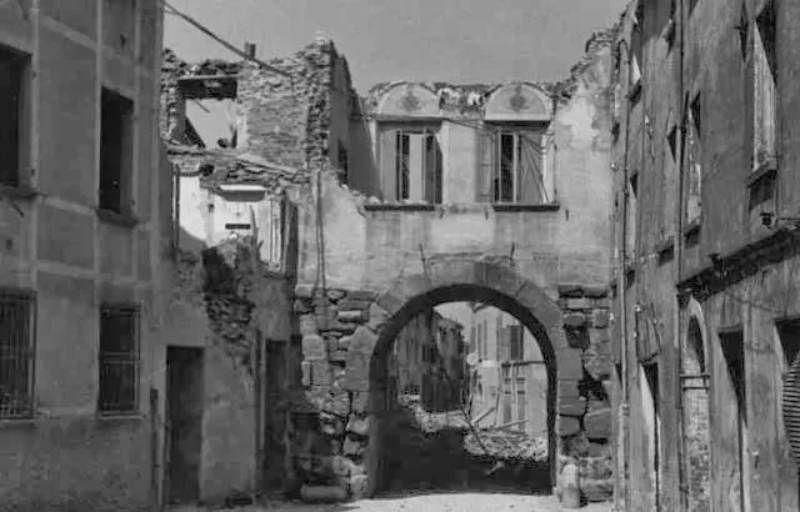
Porta Montanara after the Allied aerial bombardment in 1944, showing the original south-facing arch (now destroyed)

From 1916, the arch gave its name to a station on the Rimini–Novafeltria railway, Rimini Porta Montanara. The railway, which closed in 1960, skirted the ancient city walls before following the Marecchia to Verucchio and Mercantino Marecchia. The station building is still extant, but abandoned.

During the Second World War, Porta Montanara survived Rimini's extensive Allied aerial bombardment. On 26 March 1944, bombing hit the Palazzo Turchi and uncovered the walled arch, which had retained its Roman appearance. Following Rimini's liberation, the non-walled arch was destroyed to facilitate the movement of South African tanks through the city. The engineers almost destroyed the Arch of Augustus by mistake. The stones of the demolished arch were used to repave destroyed roads.

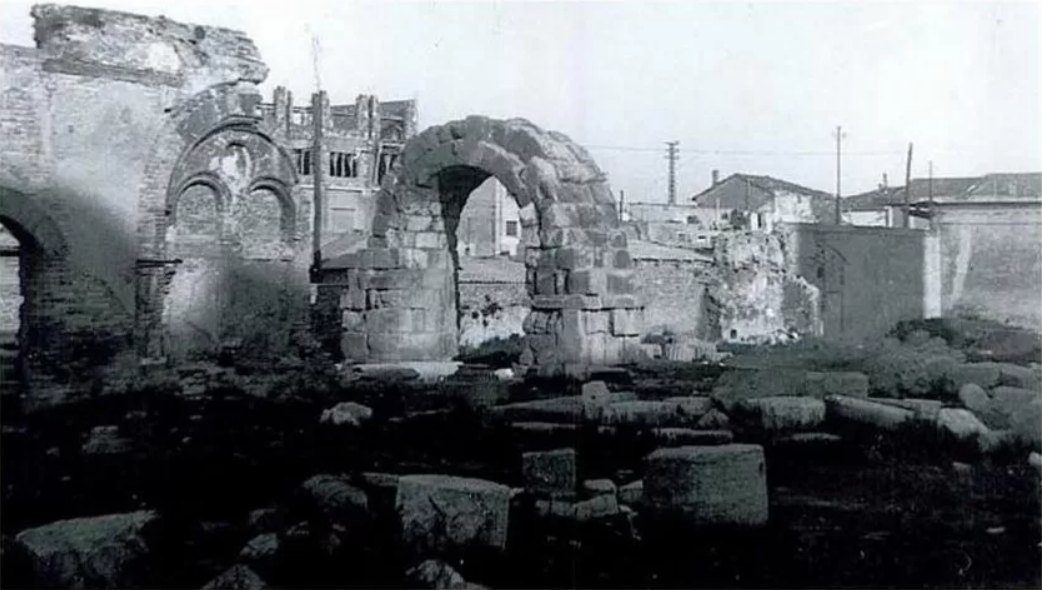
Porta Montanara following its relocation, among the ruins of San Francesco, c. 1953

On 4 November 1946, a series of works began to consolidate the remaining, unwalled arch: a report from the municipal inspector noted that the arch's ashlars were frequently burgled, putting the arch under threat of collapsing. Despite these works, the arch was threatened by plans to widen Via Giuseppe Garibaldi. In 1949, the Italian government declared that it had no monumental value. Thus, between November 1949 and June 1950, the arch was deconstructed and reassembled in the courtyard of the Tempio Malatestiano, among the ruins of the former convent of San Francesco. The arch's reassembly used modern cement, and its 280 ashlars were not correctly placed in their original positions, while new ashlars had been added. A planned protective roof was never installed above the arch, leaving it exposed to erosion.

In the 1960s, following a dispute between the municipal government and the Diocese of Rimini, the wall of Rimini's new covered market was built through the arch. In 1979, to accommodate the new diocesan offices, it was dismantled and reassembled for a second time in a car park a few metres away, behind the apse of the Tempio Malatestiano.

In 2003, work began to relocate the arch near its original location in Via Garibaldi, where it could resume its function as a city gate. The works were financed by the Rotary Club Rimini, the Cassa di Risparmio di Rimini, and Assindustria, an industrial association. The arch was inaugurated at its new location by Alberto Ravaioli, Mayor of Rimini, on 9 October 2004. A commemorative medal was released for the occasion, showing the two original arches on one face and Rimini's ancient Roman grid plan on the reverse face.

== Appearance ==
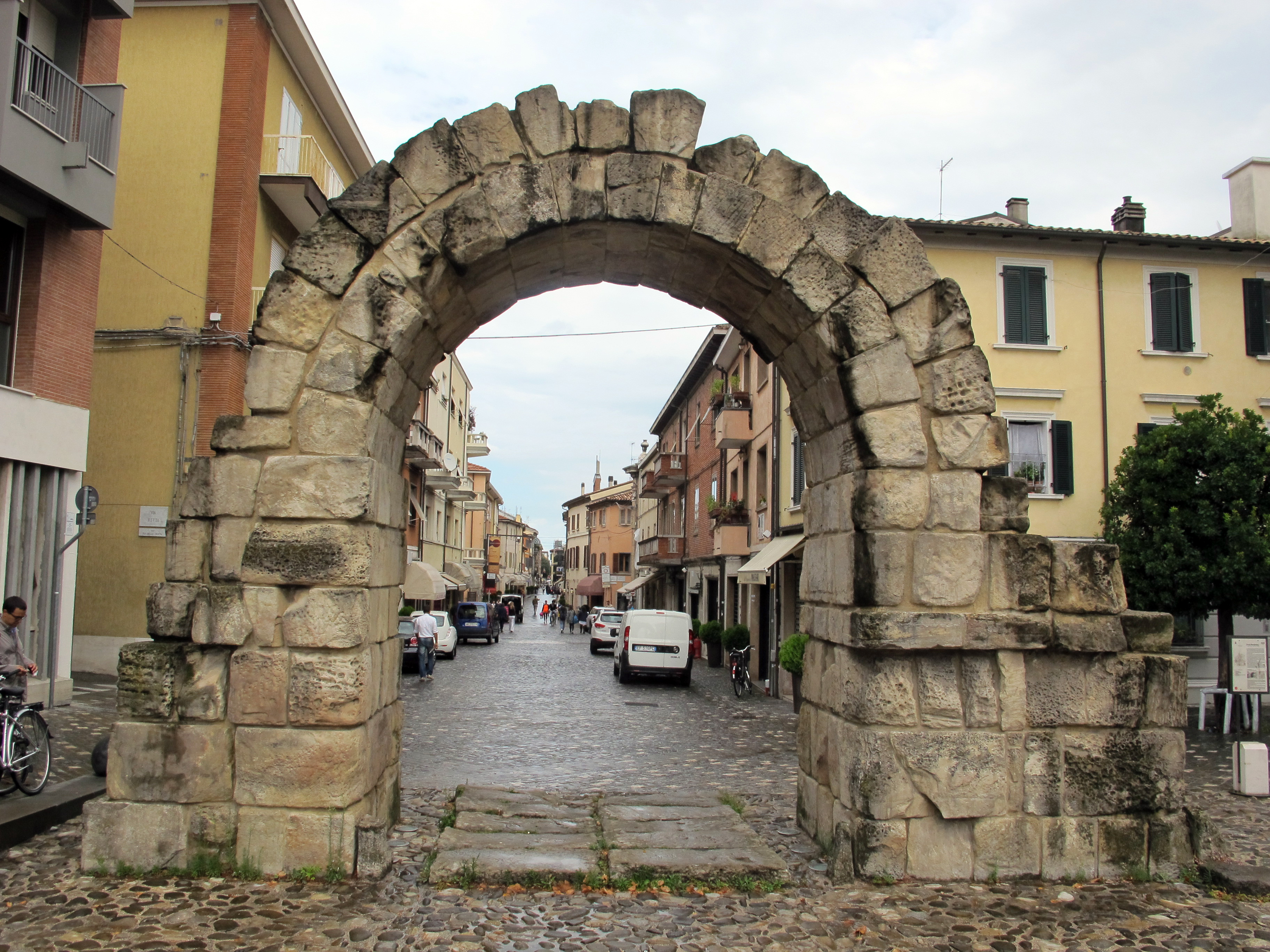
The outside face of Porta Montanara, looking towards Rimini's central Piazza Tre Martiri, September 2013

The arch is made from blocks of sandstone from either the nearby Covignano hill or Pietracuta, a village on the Marecchia river in the municipality of San Leo, near the Sammarinese border. The original gate complex measured 12.5 metres (41 feet) wide and 2.2 metres (7.2 feet) deep, with each arch at a height of 5.9 metres (19 feet). The remaining arch is 3.45 metres (11.3 feet) wide. The arch is made from doubled rows of voussoirs.

The original position of the demolished gate, 40 metres (130 feet) along Via Garibaldi towards Piazza Tre Martiri, can be observed from cubes of flint in the road's pavement. The original site of the extant arch, having been walled as a cellar until the Second World War, is now occupied by a building.
