= Verucchio =

- Comune
- Comune di Verucchio
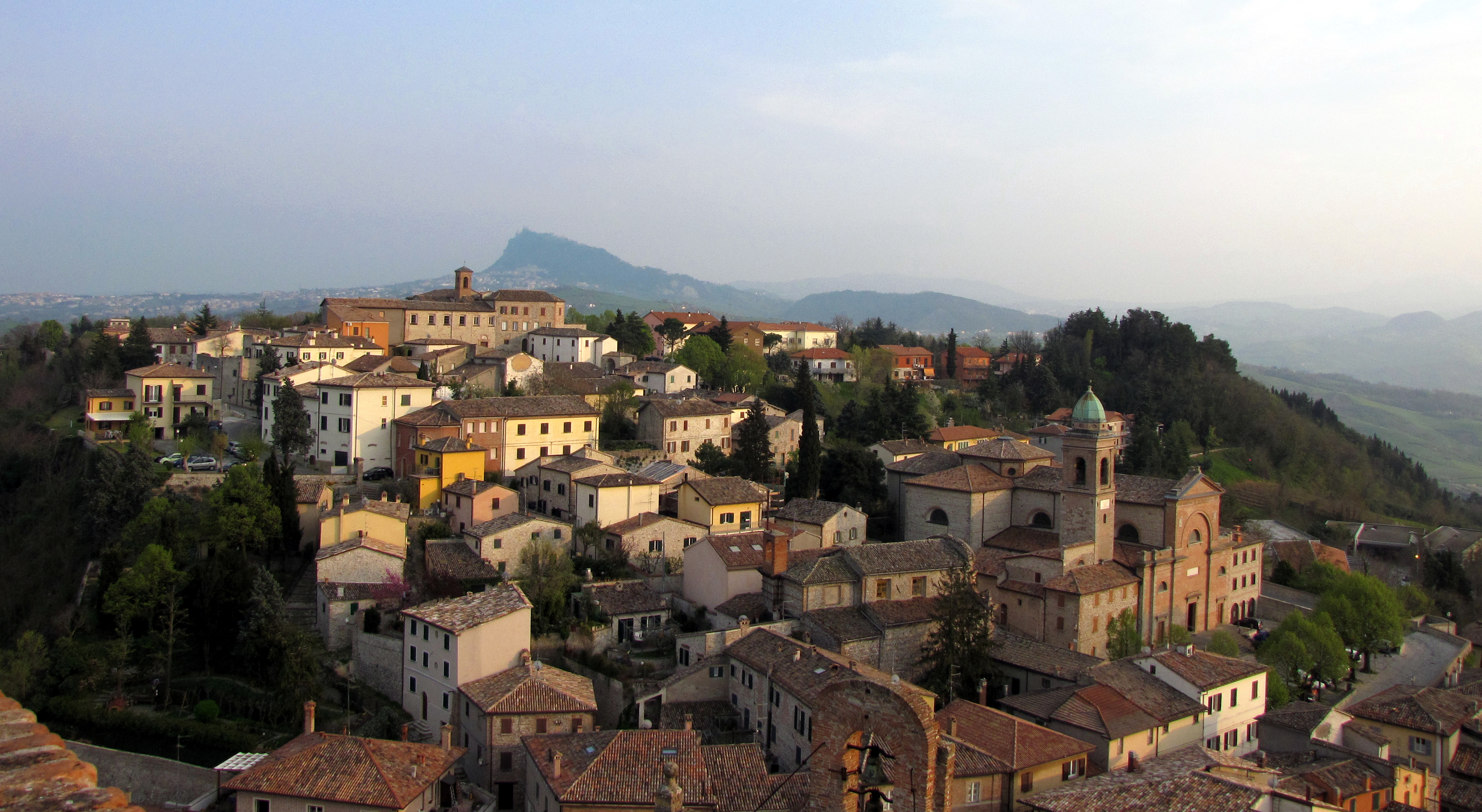
- Verucchio

- Coat of arms

- Location within Italy Location within Emilia-Romagna
- Coordinates: 43°59′N 12°26′E
- Country: Italy
- Region: Emilia-Romagna
- Province: Rimini (RN)
- Frazioni: Villa Verucchio, Ponte Verucchio, Pieve Corena

Area
  - Total: 27 km^{2} (10 sq mi)
- Elevation: 330 m (1,080 ft)

Population (31 December 2004)
  - Total: 9,365
  - Density: 350/km^{2} (900/sq mi)
- Demonym: Verucchiesi
- Time zone: UTC+1 (CET)
  - Summer (DST): UTC+2 (CEST)
- Postal code: 47826
- Dialing code: 0541
- Patron saint: Saint Martin
- Saint day: November 11
- Website: Official website

Verucchio (Romagnol: Vròcc) is a comune in the province of Rimini, region of Emilia-Romagna, Italy. It has a population of about 9,300 and is 18 kilometres (11 mi) from Rimini, on a spur overlooking the valley of the Marecchia river. It is one of I Borghi più belli d'Italia ("The most beautiful villages of Italy").

== History ==
Traces of a 12th-9th century BC settlement, supposed of Villanovan origin, have been found overlooking the Adriatic plain. Later it was an Etruscan possession. The current town derives its name from Vero Occhio ("True Eye"), referring to its privileged position offering a wide panorama of the surrounding countryside and the Romagna coast.

Malatesta da Verucchio, founder of the Malatesta lordship of Romagna, was born here. His successors fortified it as a powerful bastion against the Montefeltro of Urbino. After the expulsion of the Malatesta (15th century), it was a fief of the Medici in the Papal States; it remained part of the latter, with a short stint under the Republic of Venice, until 1620.

Between 1916 and 1960, Verucchio was served by the Rimini–Novafeltria railway, with stops at Villa Verucchio and Ponte Verucchio; the latter stop, named simply Verucchio, was opened with the railway's extension to San Marino-Torello in 1921. The railway's most-used section was between Rimini and Villa Verucchio. Following its closure, much of the railway was incorporated into the SP258 provincial road. To allow the road's widening, the tracks in the province of Forlì were removed in 1964, costing 17.5 million lire. Both station buildings in Verucchio are extant: Villa Verucchio's is used by buses, while Verucchio's houses a United Nations research centre.

Verucchio was also supposed to be served by the Santarcangelo–Urbino railway, also known as the subappenine railway, which would have connected Santarcangelo di Romagna with Urbino. The project was intended to provide an inland alternative to the Bologna–Ancona railway, whose coastal position made it vulnerable to bombardment. It was abandoned in 1933, but some tracks had already been laid in the section from Santarcangelo to San Leo. Some of these tracks were reused by the Rimini–Novafeltria railway along a new post-war alignment.

On 16 April 1992, the municipality transferred from the province of Forlì to the newly created province of Rimini.

== Main sights ==
Rocca del Sasso in Verucchio

- Rocca Malatestiana (Malatesta Castle, 12th-16th century; also known as Castel del Sasso, or "Castle of the Rock"). It is one of largest and better conserved Malatestian fortifications, and was the birthplace of Malatesta da Verucchio. In 1449 Sigismondo Pandolfo Malatesta enlarged it.
- Archaeological Museum
- Rocca del Passerello with the annexed gate.
- Romanesque-Gothic Pieve, dating around 990.
- Franciscan Convent (c. 1215), the most ancient in Romagna. Inside the church is a masterpiece of the 13th century Riminese painting school representing the crucifixion. Outside is a 700-year-old cypress that, according to the legend, was planted by St. Francis himself.

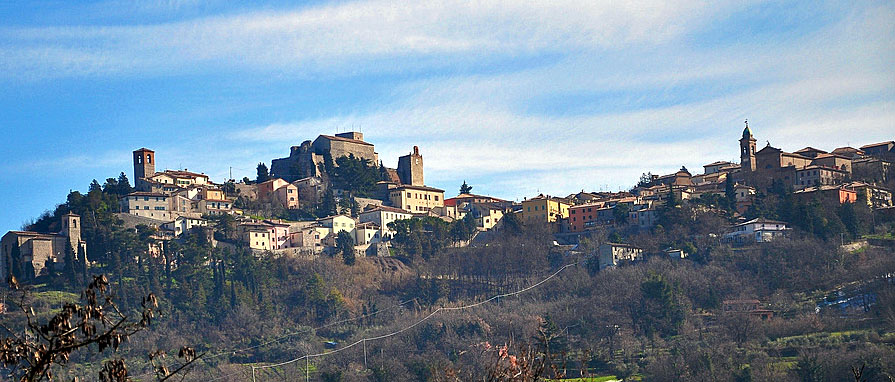
Panorama Verucchio
