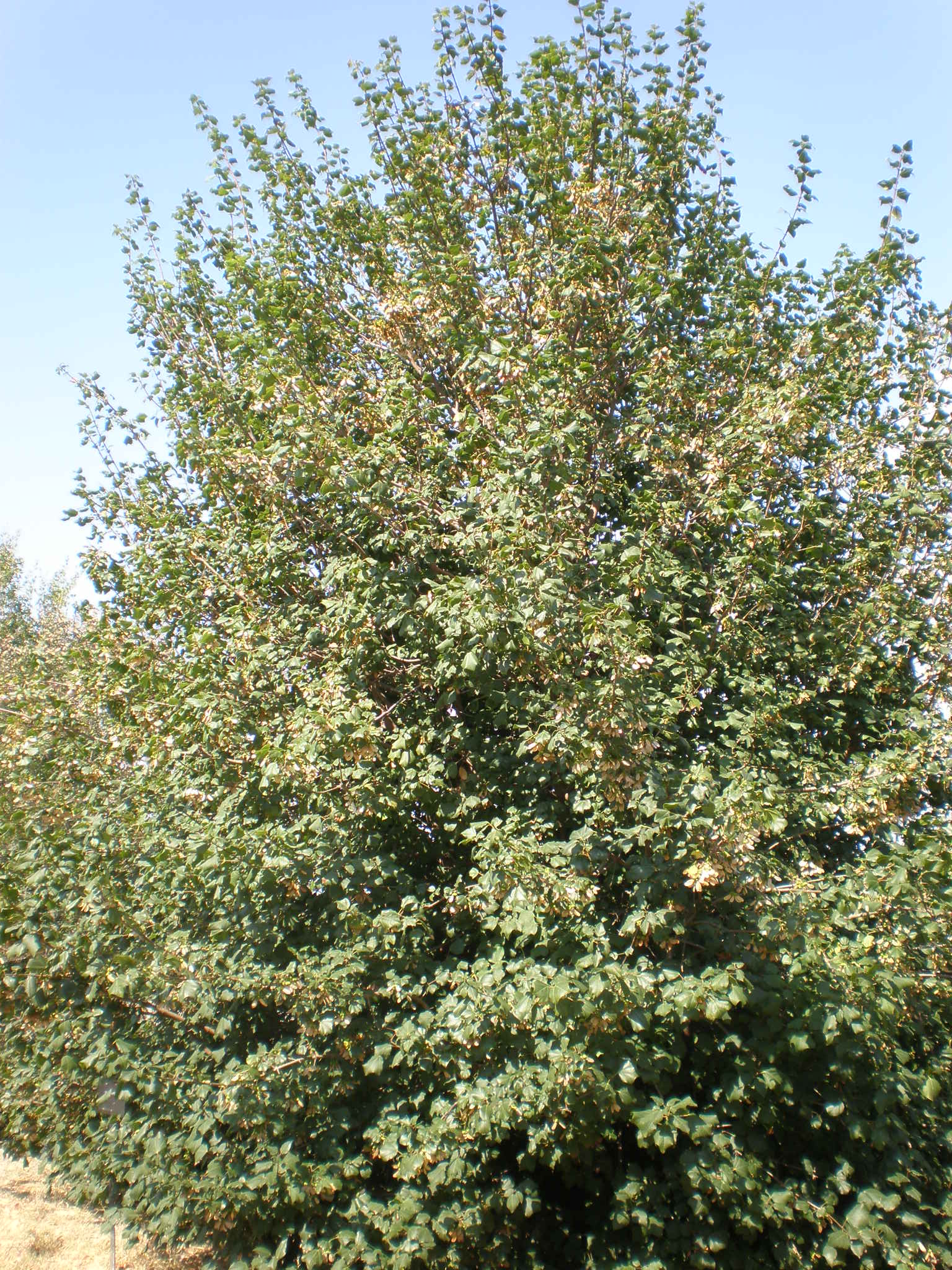

Conservation status
- Least Concern (IUCN 3.1)

Scientific classification
- Kingdom: Plantae
- Clade: Tracheophytes
- Clade: Angiosperms
- Clade: Eudicots
- Clade: Rosids
- Order: Sapindales
- Family: Sapindaceae
- Genus: Acer
- Section: Acer sect. Acer
- Series: Acer ser. Monspessulana
- Species: A. obtusifolium

Binomial name
- Acer obtusifolium Sm. 1824
- Distribution map

Synonyms
- Acer creticum var. sublobatum Spach; Acer orientale subsp. cyprium (Boiss.) A.E.Murray; Acer orientale var. obtusifolium (Sm.) Pax; Acer orientale subsp. syriacum (Boiss. & Gaill.) A.E.Murray; Acer syriacum Boiss. & Gaill.; Acer syriacum var. cyprium Boiss.

= Acer obtusifolium =

Species of maple

Acer obtusifolium, the Syrian maple or Cyprus maple, is a Middle-eastern species of maple.

== Description ==
Acer obtusifolium is an evergreen maple that forms a shrub, but can also be grown into a tree to a height of about 16 feet. It has leathery foliage varying from unlobed to tri-lobed. The leaves are normally gray-green.

== Distribution ==
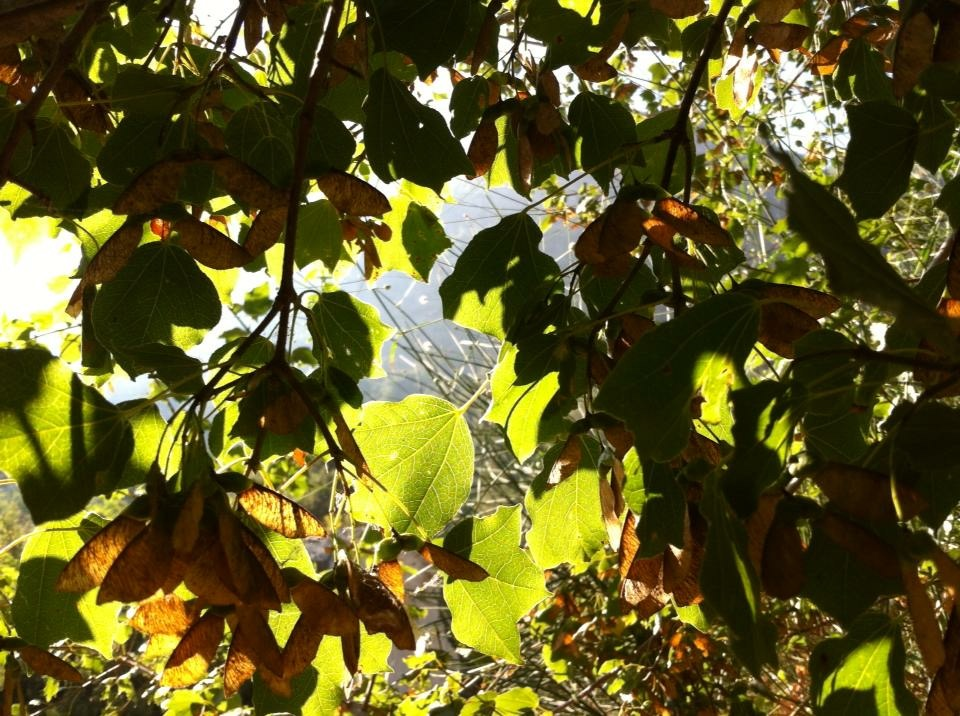
Acer obtusifolium leaves and samaras, Mount Lebanon heights.

This species is found in Cyprus, Syria, Lebanon, and Israel. It grows on sides of coastal mountains in Mediterranean maquis shrubland. Historically, it was recorded in Crete but is now extinct in the region, and its purported presence in Turkey has recently been disproven.
