= Monte dei Frati =

Mountain in Italy

- Location within Italy

Highest point
- Elevation: 1,454 m (4,770 ft)
- Coordinates: 43°40′N 12°10′E

Geography
- Location: Arezzo, Italy
- Parent range: Apennines

Monte dei Frati is a mountain in the Italian province of Arezzo near the border with Pesaro e Urbino and Perugia.

== Geography ==
The mountain is 1,454 metres (4,770 ft) in height. It is on the border between the Umbrian Apennines and the Umbrian-Marchean Apennines. It is near the sources of the Marecchia and Metauro rivers. The Tiber flows near the western side of the mountain.
