= Luigi Rossini =

Italian artist (1790–1857)

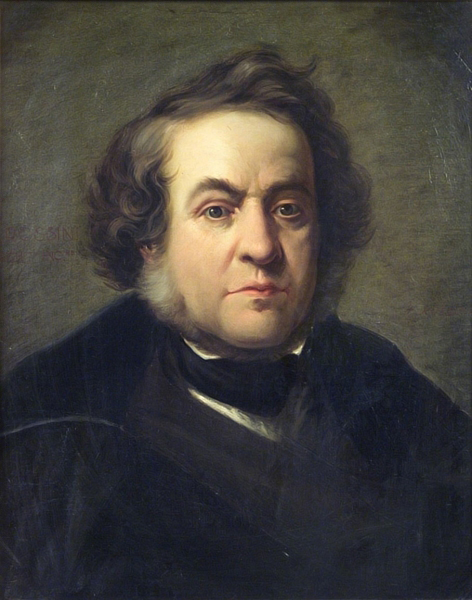
Portrait of Luigi Rossini

Luigi Rossini (1790 – 1857) was an Italian artist, best known for his etchings of ancient Roman architecture.

== Early life ==
Born 1790, in Ravenna, Rossini studied at the academy of Bologna with Antonio Basoli and Giovanni Antonio Antolini, graduating in 1813 as an architect and artist.

== Career ==
Like his predecessor Giovanni Battista Piranesi, Rossini focused on extant antique Roman architecture and excavations in Rome and its environs, and rendered in exquisite detail classical architecture of Rome and its surrounding countryside. In contrast to Piranesi, he made greater use of the bucolic settings in his etchings of Roman ruins. His images of the architectural masterpieces of ancient Rome, including the Pantheon, the Coliseum, the Appian Way, the Temple of Peace, and the Golden House of Nero, have greatly influenced architects, artists, writers, and other connoisseurs of Roman culture up to the present day.

His first series of views was published in 1814. He began his Roman antiquities series in 1819, completing 101 large folio plates which were published in Rome in 1825. He died in 1857, aged 66 or 67.

== Gallery ==
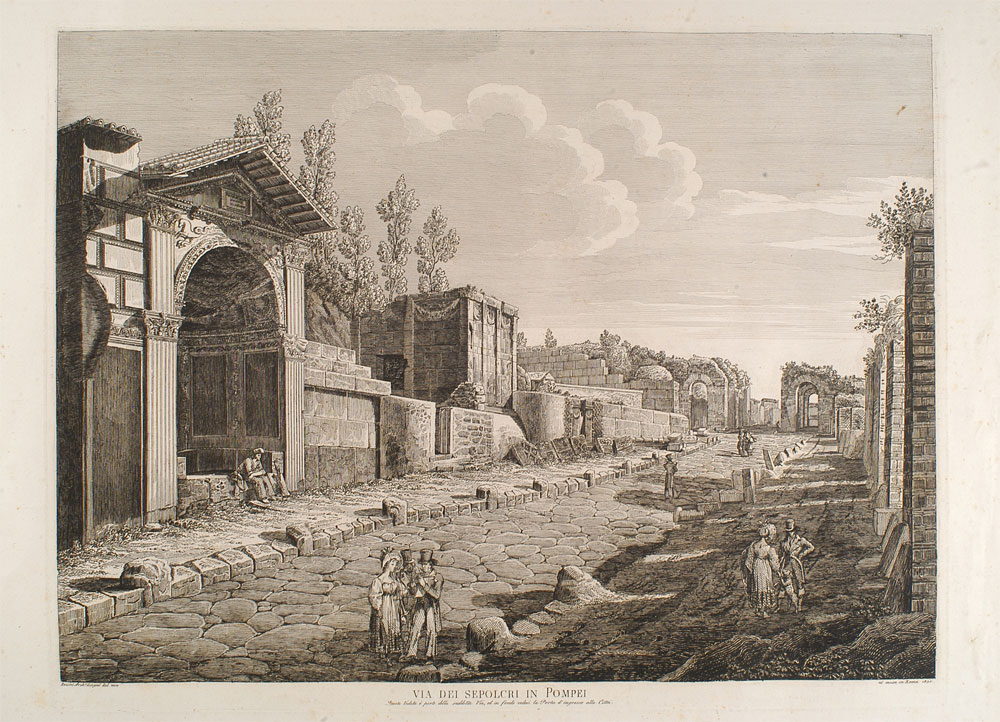
Via dei Sepolcri in Pompei, Rome, 1830.

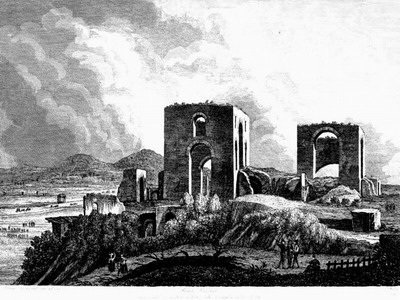
A view of the Villa of the Quintilii from Rossini's Viaggio pittoresco da Roma a Napoli, 1839

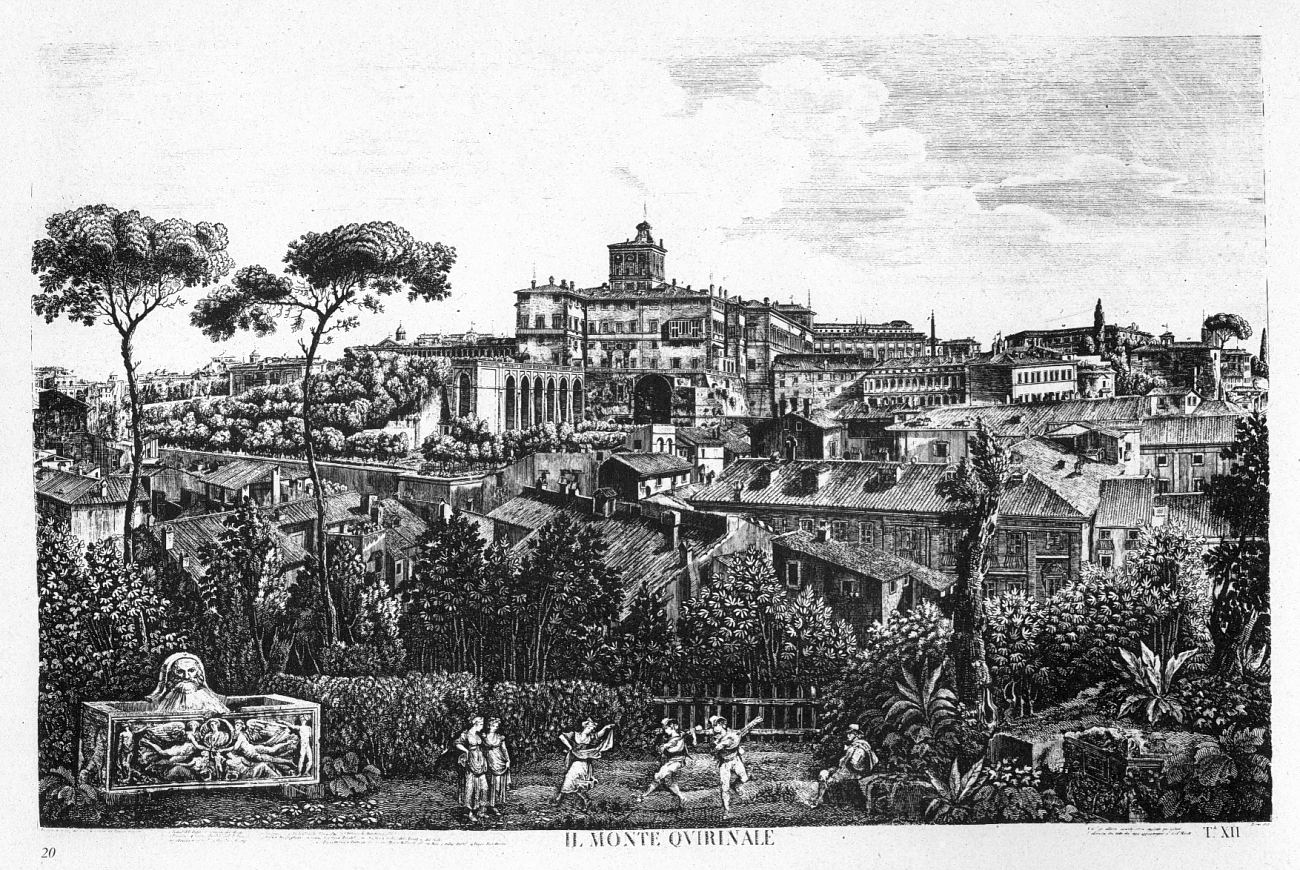
An etching of the Quirinal Hill, crowned by the mass of the Palazzo del Quirinale, from Rossini's 'I Sette Colli di Roma antica e moderna published in 1827

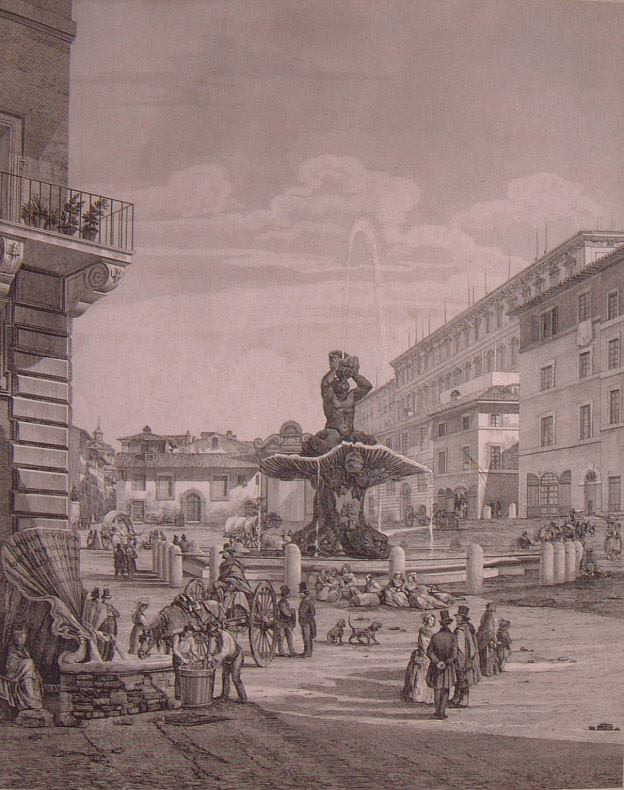
View of the Piazza Barberini, 1848

== References and sources ==
Sources

- Nullo Pirazzoli, Luigi Rossini (1790–1857). Roma antica restaurata, Ravenna, Edizioni Essegi, 1990
