= San Marino (river) =

Location
- Country: Italy, San Marino

Physical characteristics
- Source
  - location: San Paolo Mountain
  - elevation: 864 m (2,835 ft)
- Mouth: Marecchia
  - location: Torello, frazione of San Leo
  - coordinates: 43.9632°N 12.3975°E
- Length: 8.7 km (5.4 mi)

Basin features
- Progression: Marecchia→ Adriatic Sea

The San Marino (Italian: Rio San Marino) is a river in the Italian Peninsula. It flows through San Marino (Chiesanuova and Acquaviva), then north into Italy. For some of its length it forms part of the border between the two countries. It flows into the Marecchia at Torello, part of the commune of San Leo (Province of Rimini).
