= Ausa (river) =

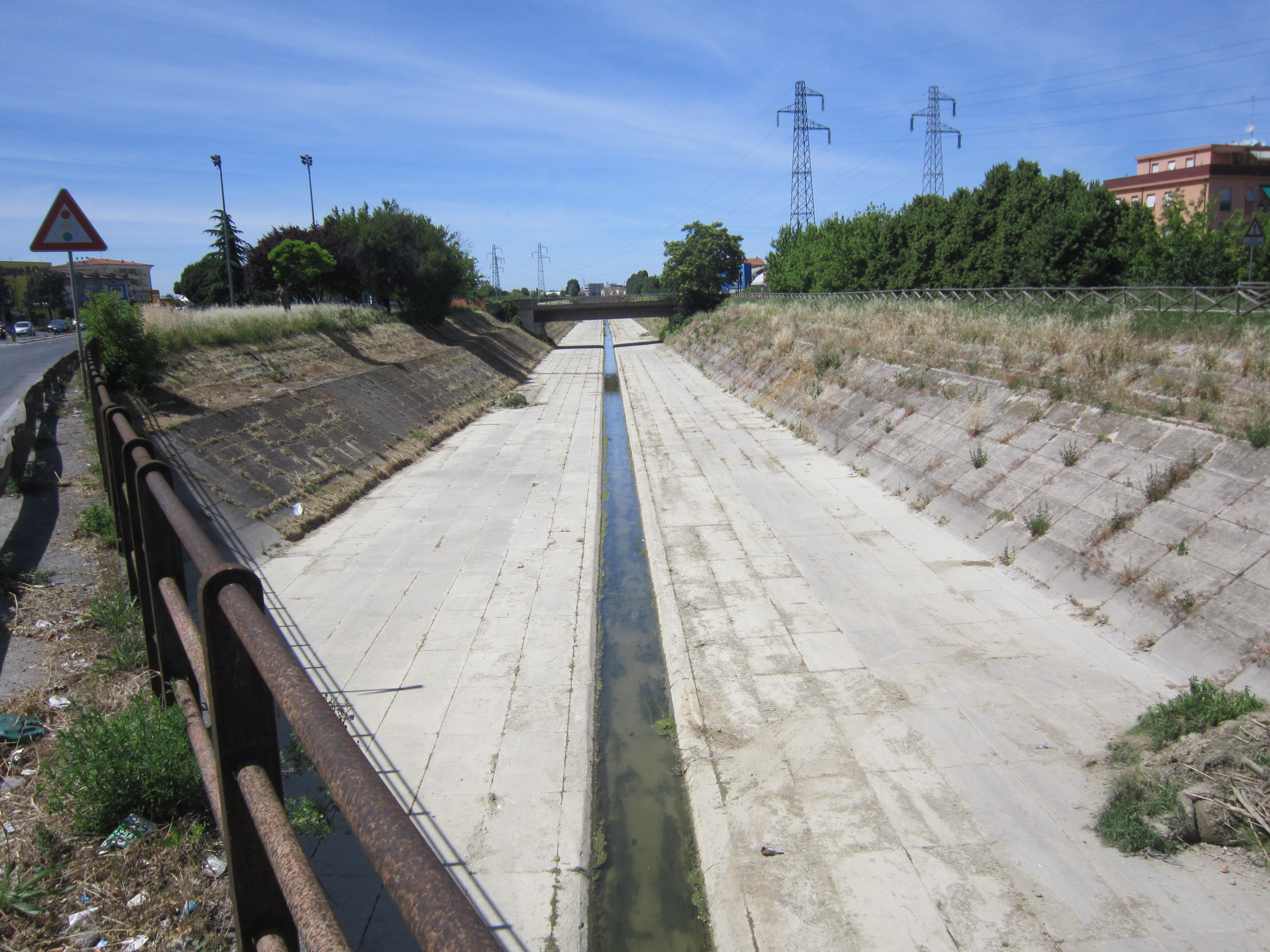
- Ausa at Rimini

Location
- Country: San Marino and Italy

Physical characteristics
- Source
  - location: Monte Titano
- Mouth: Marecchia
  - coordinates: 44.0635°N 12.5475°E

Basin features
- Progression: Marecchia→ Adriatic Sea

The Ausa is a minor river some 17 kilometres (11 mi) long that traverses part of northern San Marino and Emilia–Romagna in Italy.

The source of the river is Monte Titano in central San Marino. The river flows northeast past Serravalle and crosses the border into the Italian province of Rimini close to Dogana. The river continues flowing northeast and is channelled through storm drains at Rimini before emptying into the Marecchia. It features the lowest point of San Marino, at 55 metres (180 ft) above sea level, at the point where it leaves the country.

== Course ==
The river rises in San Marino. It flows northeast through the towns of Serravalle and Dogana, and forms the northern border between Italy and San Marino as it curves east past Rovereta. After Cerasolo, a frazione of Coriano, the Ausa turns northeast, turning again to reach Via Monetscudo on the outskirts of urban Rimini.

Until the 1960s, the Ausa flowed south of Rimini's city centre, running between the present-day Rimini Sud junction of the A14 tolled highway and the Arch of Augustus, where it turned north-east along the old city walls to empty at Piazzale Kennedy. Following a diversion completed in 1972, the Ausa flows northwest along cemented banks, curving north near Rimini's Villaggio Azzurro to empty into the Marecchia, near the point where the Marecchia itself was realigned.

== History ==
Until the 1960s, the Ausa flowed south of Rimini's city centre, running between the present-day Rimini Sud junction of the A14 tolled highway and the Arch of Augustus, where it turned north-east along the old city walls to empty at Piazzale Kennedy.

The Ausa, known to the ancient Romans as the Aprusa, formed the southern border of the colonia of Ariminum, but was too small to provide a natural defence, and so was supplemented by Rimini's city walls. Whether the Romans had a port on the Ausa remains a matter of local historical debate. It was traversed by a double-arched bridge. The Ausa remained the southern border of the medieval city, ruled by the House of Malatesta.

In the late 19th century, the Ausa divided Rimini's coastline between the elegant bathing establishment to its north and the unattended beach to its south. In 1869, Carlo Matteucci established a marine hospital for the treatment of scrofulous patients to the Ausa's south. Because the bathing establishment enforced gender segregation, trespassing across the Ausa became popular among bathers.

In 1892, a wooden bridge was constructed at the Ausa's mouth to extend the bathing establishment. The bridge allowed the development of villas and summer homes south of the Ausa. In 1903, four planks were illegally installed at the river's mouth to provide a walkway. In 1912, a stone bridge was installed, which was refurbished in 1932. In 1934, the wooden walkway was removed to allow a small port for boats, which remained until after the Second World War. The port was officially inaugurated on 22 November 1934 with the formation of Rimini's Nautical Club. In the post-war period, the mouth was notable for its putrid and stagnant waters.

A permanent walkway at the river's mouth was installed in the early 1960s, supplemented by further bridges. From the 1960s, the Ausa was diverted to flow parallel to the SS16 state road along cemented banks, and empty into the Marecchia. The diversion was completed in 1972, with the Ausa's former route reduced to a sewage outlet, and redeveloped into a series of public parks.
