= Marecchia =

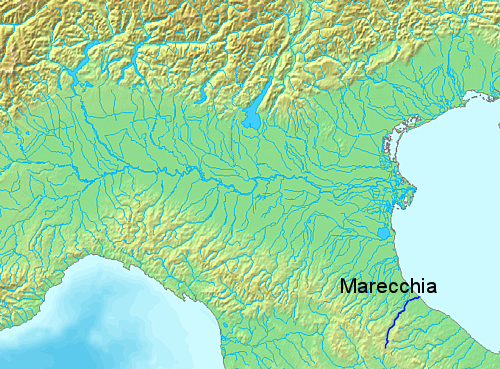

Location
- Country: Italy

Physical characteristics
- Source
  - location: Monte dei Frati in the Province of Arezzo
  - elevation: 1,454 m (4,770 ft)
- Mouth: Adriatic Sea
  - coordinates: 44.0763°N 12.5634°E
- Length: 70 km (43 mi)
- Basin size: 941 km^{2} (363 sq mi)
- Discharge
  - average: 10.8 m^{3}/s (380 cu ft/s) (at Pietracuta)

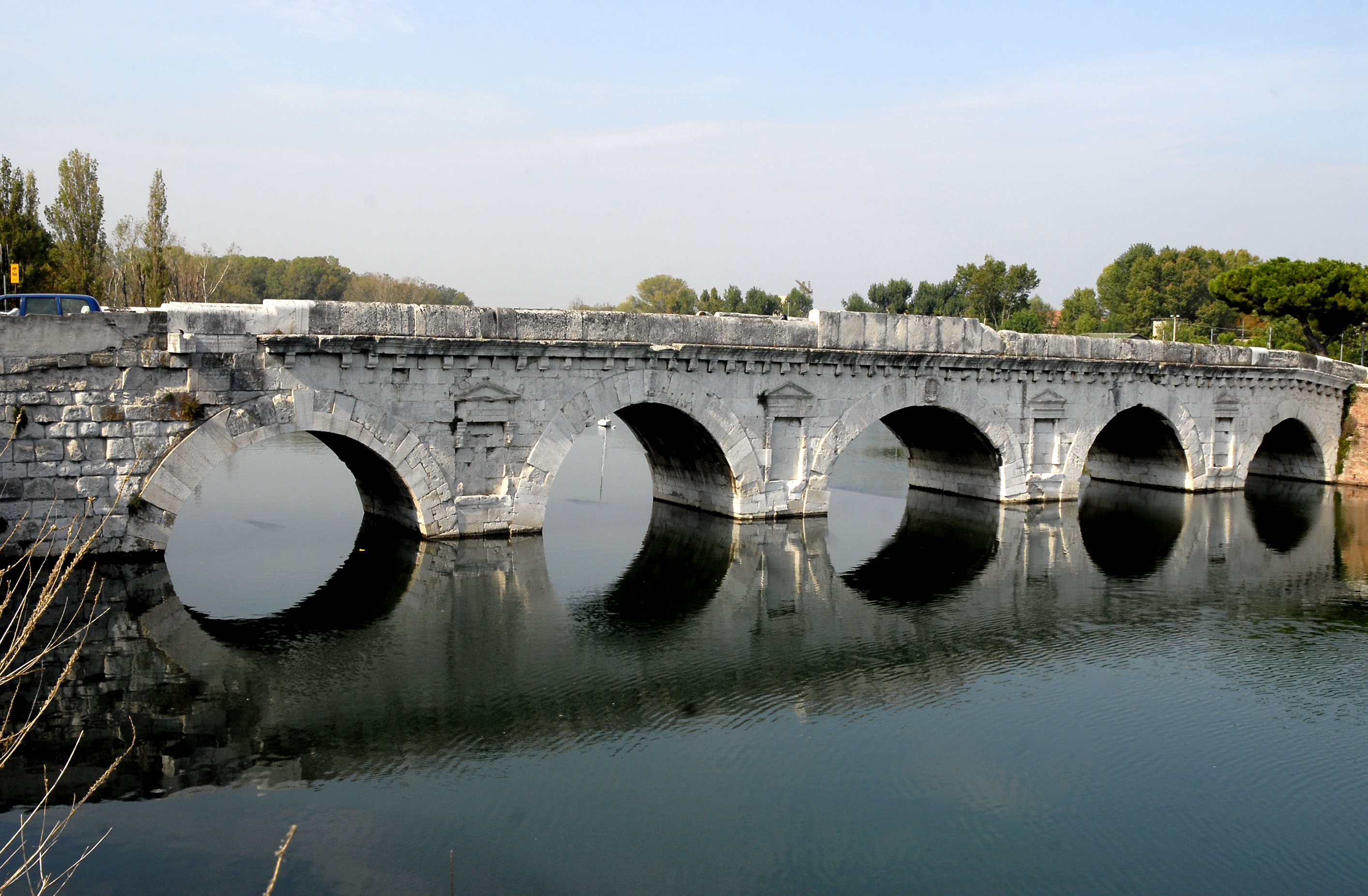
The Ponte di Tiberio crosses the Marecchia's former route in Rimini

The Marecchia (pronounced [maˈrekkja]) is a river in eastern Italy, flowing from near Monte dei Frati in the province of Arezzo, Tuscany, to the Adriatic Sea in Rimini, Emilia-Romagna. Along its course, the river passes next to or near the settlements of Novafeltria, Verucchio, and Santarcangelo di Romagna. It passes near the Republic of San Marino. Among its tributaries are the San Marino river and the Ausa.

The river's valley, known as the Valmarecchia, is on the border of the historic regions of Romagna and Montefeltro. On 15 August 2009, the comuni of the upper valley transferred from the province of Pesaro and Urbino, in the Marche region, to the province of Rimini in Emilia-Romagna.

== Route ==
The source of the river is near Monte dei Frati, east of Pieve Santo Stefano and southwest of Badia Tedalda in the province of Arezzo, Tuscany. Flowing northeast, it includes the settlement of Novafeltria on its left bank, and receives the Torrente Mazzocco on its right bank. It flows near Pietracuta, after which it receives the San Marino river on its right bank, by the settlement of Torello. Continuing northeast, the river flows near Verucchio and Santarcangelo di Romagna, after which it flows east parallel to the Via Aemilia, emptying into the Adriatic Sea in Rimini.

The river marks the boundary of several comuni, including Casteldelci and Sestino in the province of Arezzo, and Sant'Agata Feltria, Pennabilli, Novafeltria, Maiolo, Talamello, San Leo, Poggio Torriana, and Verucchio in the province of Rimini, Emilia-Romagna. It passes through an exclave of Badia Tedalda, surrounded by the province of Rimini, and the comune of Santarcangelo di Romagna.

== History ==
The river was anciently called the Ariminus. While on his way to fight the Gothic army, the Byzantine general Narses crossed the Marecchia on a pontoon after the leader of the Goths contesting his passage of the river was killed in a skirmish. The mouth of the Marecchia is also the legendary site where Anthony of Padua allegedly preached to the fish.

In the 18th and 19th centuries, the river numbered as many as 165 water mills around inhabited settlements. The valley also numbered several gunpowder mills to house sulphur mined in the sulphur mine at Perticara.

From the end of the 1920s until 1931, the Marecchia was diverted through Rimini to empty further north. On 8 April 1944, as part of the Fragheto massacre, seven partisans and a civilian were shot by members of the Venezia-Giulia Battalion of the National Republican Guard at the confluence of the Senatello stream with the Marecchia. The bridge over the Marecchia, at the time named Ponte Carrattoni, was renamed the Bridge of the Eight Martyrs (Ponte degli Otto Martiri).

From the 1960s, the Ausa was diverted to empty into the Marecchia, having previously emptied into the Adriatic Sea further east. The diversion was completed in 1972.

On 15 August 2009, the comuni of the upper valley transferred from the province of Pesaro and Urbino, in the Marche region, to the province of Rimini in Emilia-Romagna.
