= Bovee =

Bovee or Bovée may refer to:

- Bovée-sur-Barboure, a commune in the Meuse department France
- Bovee, South Dakota, a community in the United States
- Christian Nestell Bovee (1820-1904), an epigrammatic New York writer
- Leslie Bovee, an American pornographic actress
- Matthias J. Bovee (1793-1872), an American Representative from New York
- Mike Bovee, (born 1973), a retired professional baseball player

== See also ==
- Bové, a surname (including a list of people with the name)
