= Argentella (disambiguation) =

Argentella is a type of needle lace derived from Argentan lace.

Argentella may also refer to:

- Lac de l'Argentella, a reservoir in the Haute-Corse department of Corsica, France
- Monte Argentella, a mountain of Marche, Italy
