= Monte Bove (disambiguation) =

Monte Bove is a mountain in the Monti Sibillini range of the Apennines, Marche, central Italy.

Monte Bove may also refer to:

- Monte Bove (Chile), a mountain of the Cordillera Darwin, Chile
- Monte Bove Sud, a mountain of Marche, Italy
- Croce di Monte Bove, a mountain of Marche, Italy

== See also ==
- Bove (disambiguation)
