= Nearomyia =

Scientific classification
- Kingdom: Animalia
- Phylum: Arthropoda
- Class: Insecta
- Order: Diptera
- Family: Tephritidae
- Subfamily: Tephritinae
- Genus: Nearomyia; Becker, 1912

Genus of flies

Nearomyia is a genus of tephritid or fruit flies in the family Tephritidae. It is considered a synonym of Myopites.
