= Bove (disambiguation) =

Bove may refer to:

- Bove, a surname
- Capo di Bove, an archaeological site on the Appian Way on the outskirts of Rome, Italy
- House of Bove, an ancient noble patrician family of Ravello, Maritime Republic of Amalfi

== See also ==
- Monte Bove (disambiguation)
- Boves (disambiguation)
