= Boves =

Boves may refer to:

- Boves, Piedmont, a municipality in the province of Cuneo, Piedmont, Italy
- Boves, Somme, a commune in the Somme department, Hauts-de-France, France
- José Tomás Boves (1782–1814), Venezuelan warlord

== See also ==
- Bove, a surname (including a list of people with the name)
- Bové, a surname (including a list of people with the name)
