= Monte Strega =

Mountain in Italy

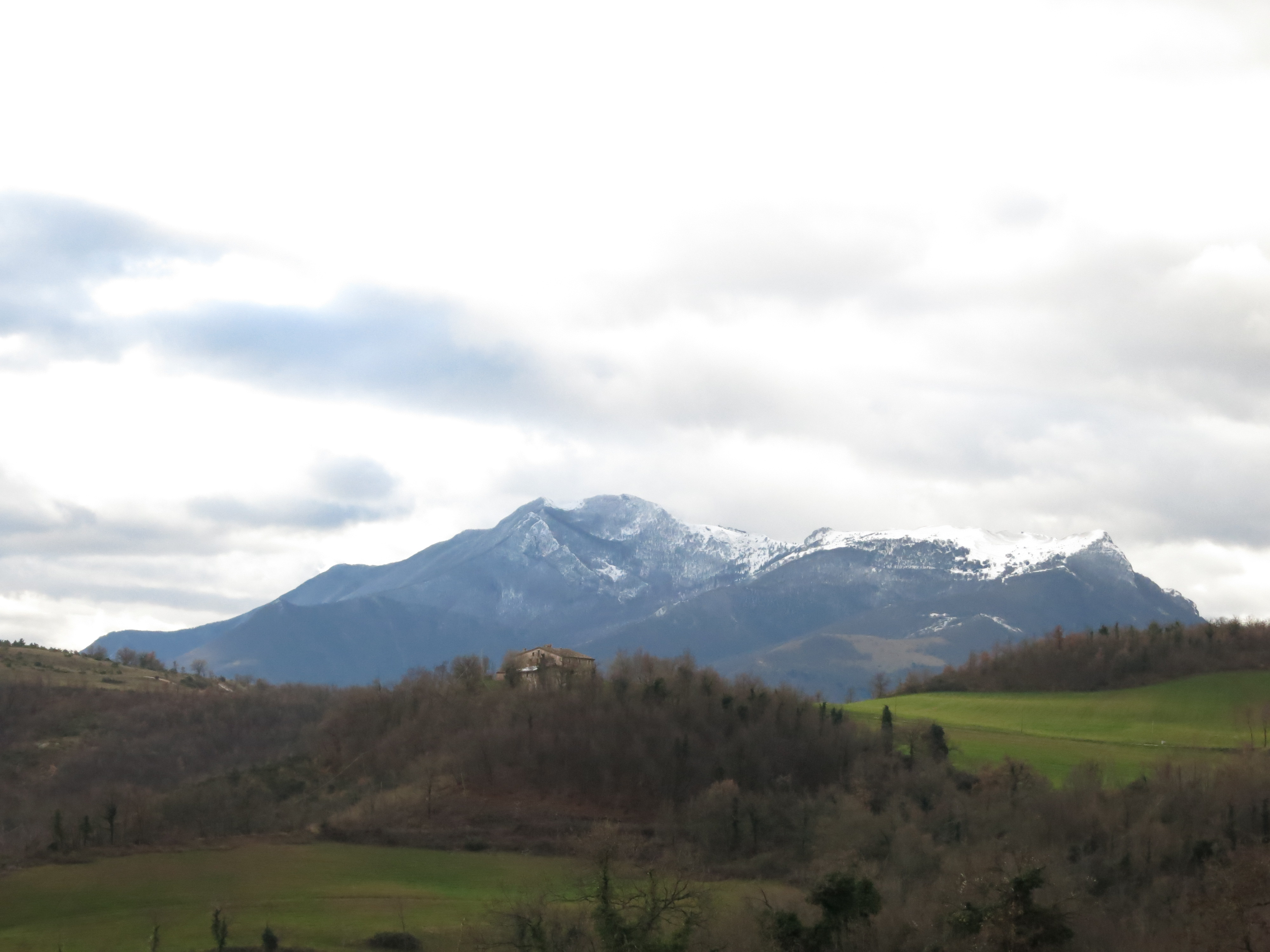

Highest point
- Elevation: 1,278 m (4,193 ft)
- Prominence: 636 m (2,087 ft)
- Isolation: 4.25 km (2.64 mi)
- Coordinates: 43°26′55″N 12°46′56″E

Geography
- Location within Italy
- Location: Marche, Italy
- Parent range: Apennines

Monte Strega is a mountain of Marche, Italy. It is thought to be the site of the Battle of Sentinum in 295 BC, when the Romans defeated the Gauls and their allies. Today, it is a popular destination for hiking, and a large metal cross has been installed at the top.

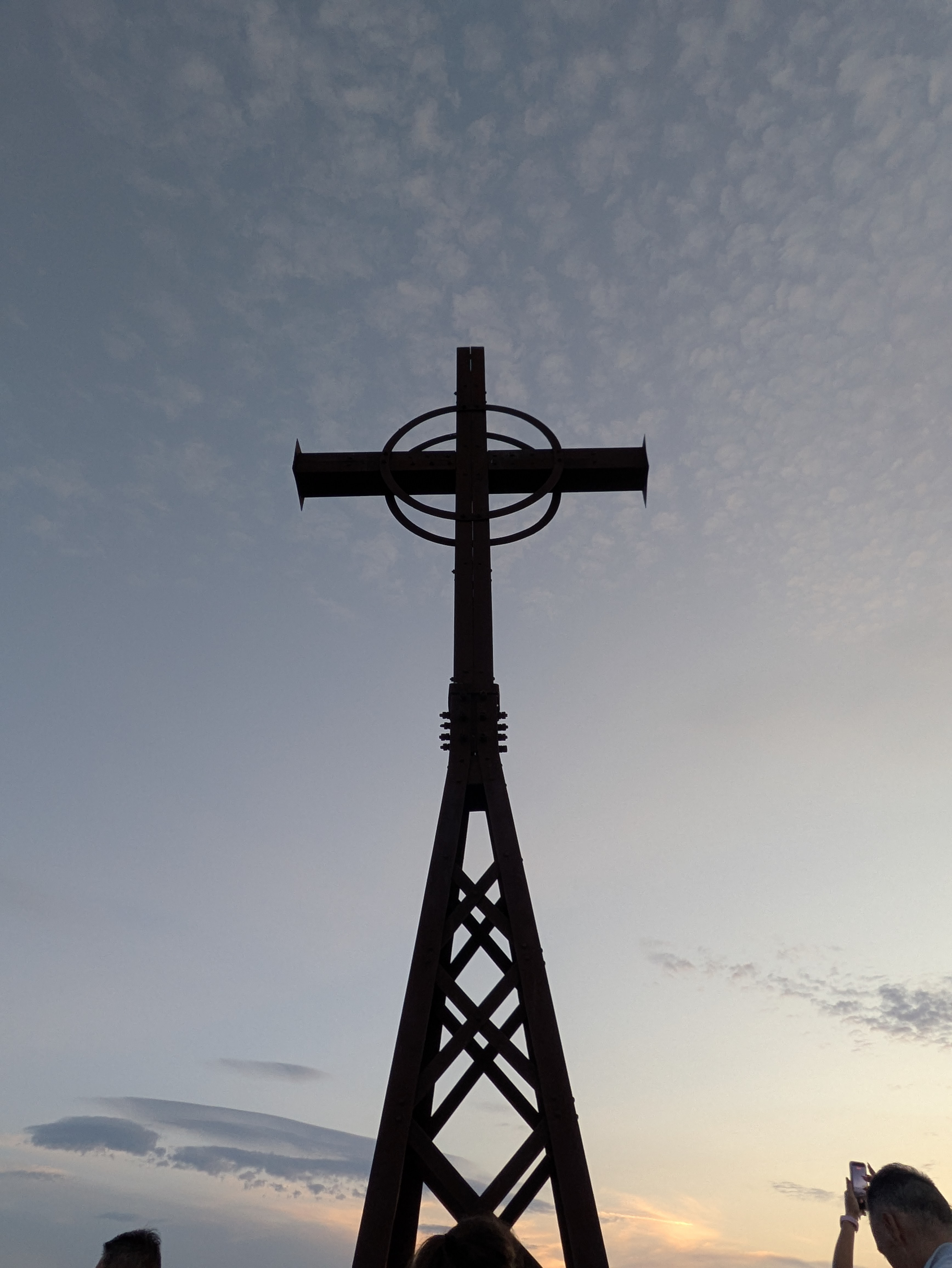
Tower atop Monte Strega
