= Myopites lelea =

Scientific classification
- Kingdom: Animalia
- Phylum: Arthropoda
- Class: Insecta
- Order: Diptera
- Family: Tephritidae
- Subfamily: Tephritinae
- Tribe: Myopitini
- Genus: Myopites
- Species: M. lelea

Binomial name
- Myopites lelea Dirlbek, 1973

Species of fly

Myopites lelea is a species of tephritid or fruit fly in the genus Myopites of the family Tephritidae.

== Distribution ==
The species is found in France.
