= Myopites bonifaciae =

Scientific classification
- Kingdom: Animalia
- Phylum: Arthropoda
- Class: Insecta
- Order: Diptera
- Family: Tephritidae
- Subfamily: Tephritinae
- Tribe: Myopitini
- Genus: Myopites
- Species: M. bonifaciae

Binomial name
- Myopites bonifaciae Dirlbek, 1973

Species of fly

Myopites bonifaciae is a species of fruit fly or tephritid in the genus Myopites of the family Tephritidae.

== Distribution ==
It is found in France.
