= Monte Porche =

Mountain in Italy

- Location within Italy

Highest point
- Elevation: 2,233 m (7,326 ft)
- Prominence: 278 m (912 ft)
- Coordinates: 42°52′28″N 13°14′12″E

Geography
- Location: Marche, Italy
- Parent range: Apennines

Monte Porche is a mountain that rises to 2,233 meters in the Ascoli Piceno province of the Marche, Italy. It is part of the Sibillini Mountains.

The source of the Aso river starts at this mountain. It crosses the provinces of Ascoli Piceno and Fermo from west to east, practically outlining the border of the provinces.

Monte Porche offers stunning panoramic views of the surrounding landscape, including the nearby Julian Alps and the Adriatic Sea.

The mountain is a popular destination for hikers and climbers, with several trails leading to the summit.

In addition to its natural beauty, Monte Porche is also home to a number of historical and cultural attractions, including World War I-era fortifications and a chapel dedicated to Saint John the Baptist.
