= Marche =

Region of Italy

Coordinates: 43°37′00″N 13°31′00″E

Marche Marches
- Region
- Flag Coat of arms
- Anthem: Inno delle Marche
- Country: Italy
- Capital: Ancona

Government
  - Type: Presidential system
  - President: Francesco Acquaroli (FdI)

Area (Note: Excluding the municipalities that detached from Marche after 2009)
  - Total: 9,344.49 km^{2} (3,607.93 sq mi)

Population (2026)
  - Total: 1,479,832
  - Density: 158.364/km^{2} (410.161/sq mi)
- Demonym(s): English: Marchesan; Italian: marchigiano (man), marchigiana (woman)

GDP
  - Total: €50.510 billion (2024)
  - Per capita: €34,128 (2024)
- Time zone: UTC+1 (CET)
  - Summer (DST): UTC+2 (CEST)
- ISO 3166 code: IT-57
- HDI (2021): 0.903 very high · 8th of 21
- NUTS Region: ITI
- Website: Regione.Marche.it

Marche (/ˈmɑːrkeɪ/ MAR-kay; Italian: [ˈmarke]), in English sometimes referred to as the Marches (/ˈmɑːrtʃɪz/ MAR-chiz), is one of the twenty regions of Italy. The region is located in the central area of the country, and has a population of nearly 1.5 million people, being the thirteenth largest region in the country by number of inhabitants. The region's capital and largest city is Ancona.

The Marche region is bordered by Emilia-Romagna and the republic of San Marino to the north, Tuscany and Umbria to the west, Lazio to the southwest, Abruzzo to the south, and the Adriatic Sea to the east. Except for river valleys and the often very narrow coastal strip, the land is hilly. A railway from Bologna to Brindisi, built in the 19th century, runs along the coast of the entire territory. Inland, the mountainous nature of the region, even today, allows relatively little travel north and south, except by twisting roads over the passes.

From the Middle Ages to the Renaissance period, many cities of the Marche were important cultural, artistic and commercial centres, the most prominent being Ancona, Pesaro, Urbino, Camerino and Ascoli Piceno.

Urbino, which was a major centre of Renaissance history, was also the birthplace of Raphael, one of the most important painters and architects of that period. The Marche region is also the birthplace of Gentile da Fabriano, Cyriacus of Ancona, Donato Bramante, Giovanni Battista Pergolesi, Giacomo Leopardi, Gioachino Rossini and Maria Montessori.

== Etymology ==
The name of the region derives from the plural of the medieval word marca, a march or mark, that is, a border zone, originally referring to a borderland territory of the Holy Roman Empire, such as the March of Ancona and others pertaining to the ancient region.

== History ==
Marche was known in ancient times as the Picenum territory. The first period of cultural unity of the Marches was in the Iron Age, when the region was almost entirely inhabited by the Picentes. Many artefacts from their time are exhibited in National Archaeological Museum of the Marche Region in Ancona. In the fourth century BC, the northern area was occupied by the Senones, a tribe of Gauls. The Battle of Sentinum was fought in Marche in 295 BC; afterwards, the Romans founded numerous colonies in the area, connected to Rome by the Via Flaminia and the Via Salaria. Ascoli was a seat of Italic resistance during the Social War (91–87 BC).

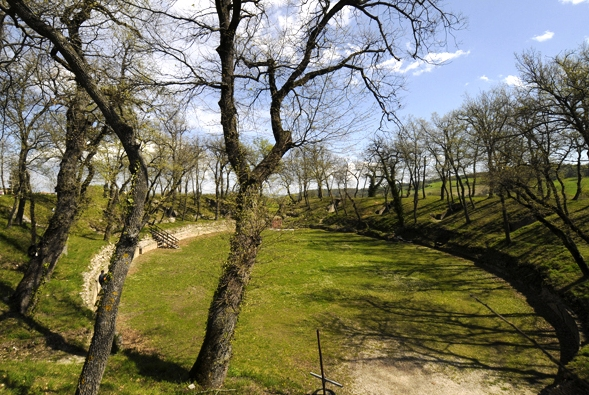
Roman Amphitheatre in the Archaeological Park of Urbs Salvia

Following the fall of the Western Roman Empire, the region was invaded by the Goths. After the Gothic War, it was part of the Byzantine Exarchate of Ravenna (Ancona, Fano, Pesaro, Rimini, and Senigallia forming the so-called Pentapolis). After the fall of the Exarchate, it was briefly in the possession of the Lombards, but was conquered by Charlemagne in the late eighth century. In the ninth to eleventh centuries, the marches of Camerino, Fermo and Ancona were created, hence the modern name.

Marche was nominally part of the Papal States, but most of the territory was under local lords, while the major cities ruled themselves as free communes. In the twelfth century, the commune of Ancona resisted both the imperial authority of Frederick Barbarossa and the Republic of Venice, and was a maritime republic on its own. An attempt to restore Papal suzerainty by Gil de Albornoz in the fourteenth century was short-lived.

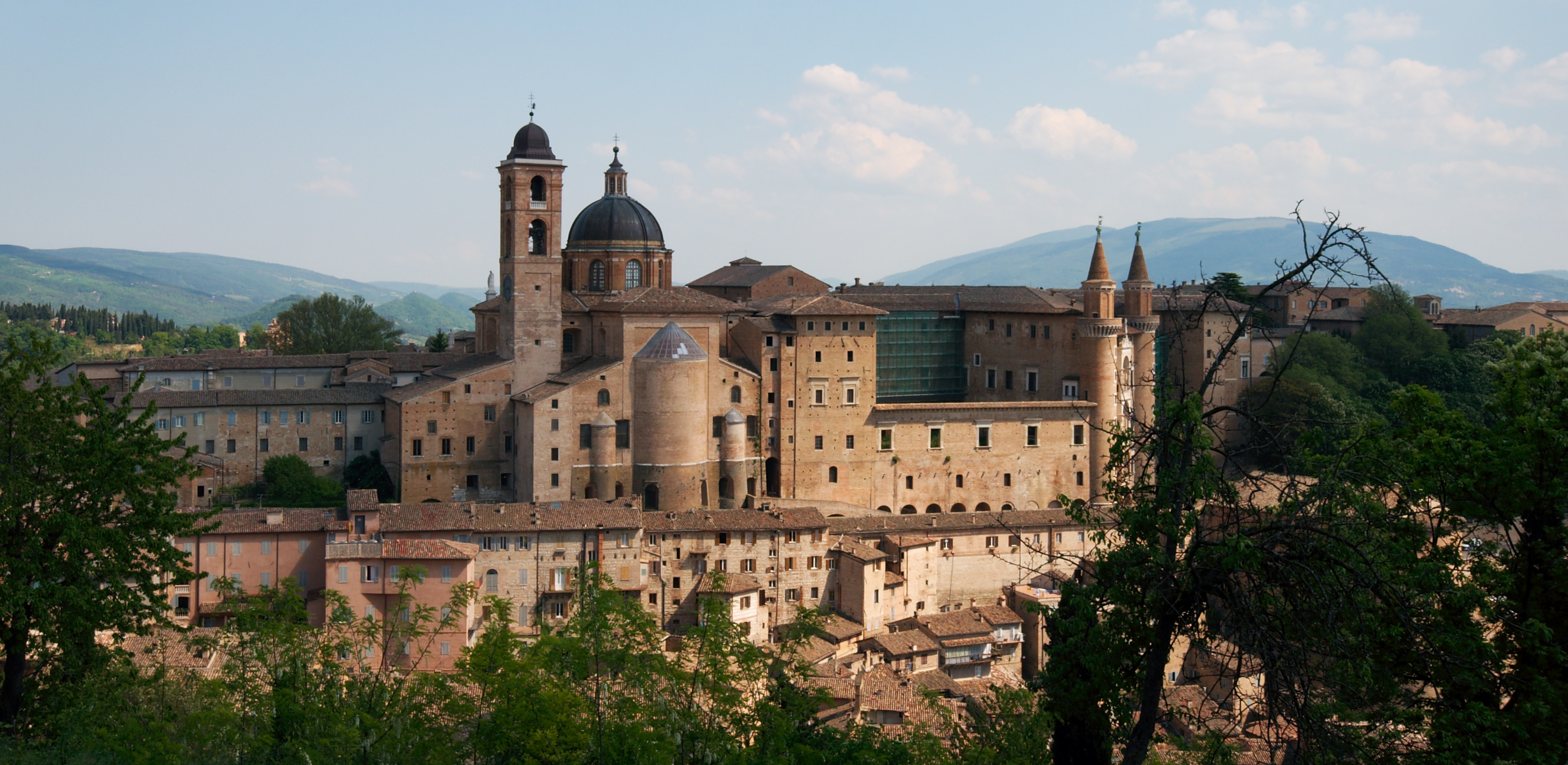
The Renaissance town of Urbino

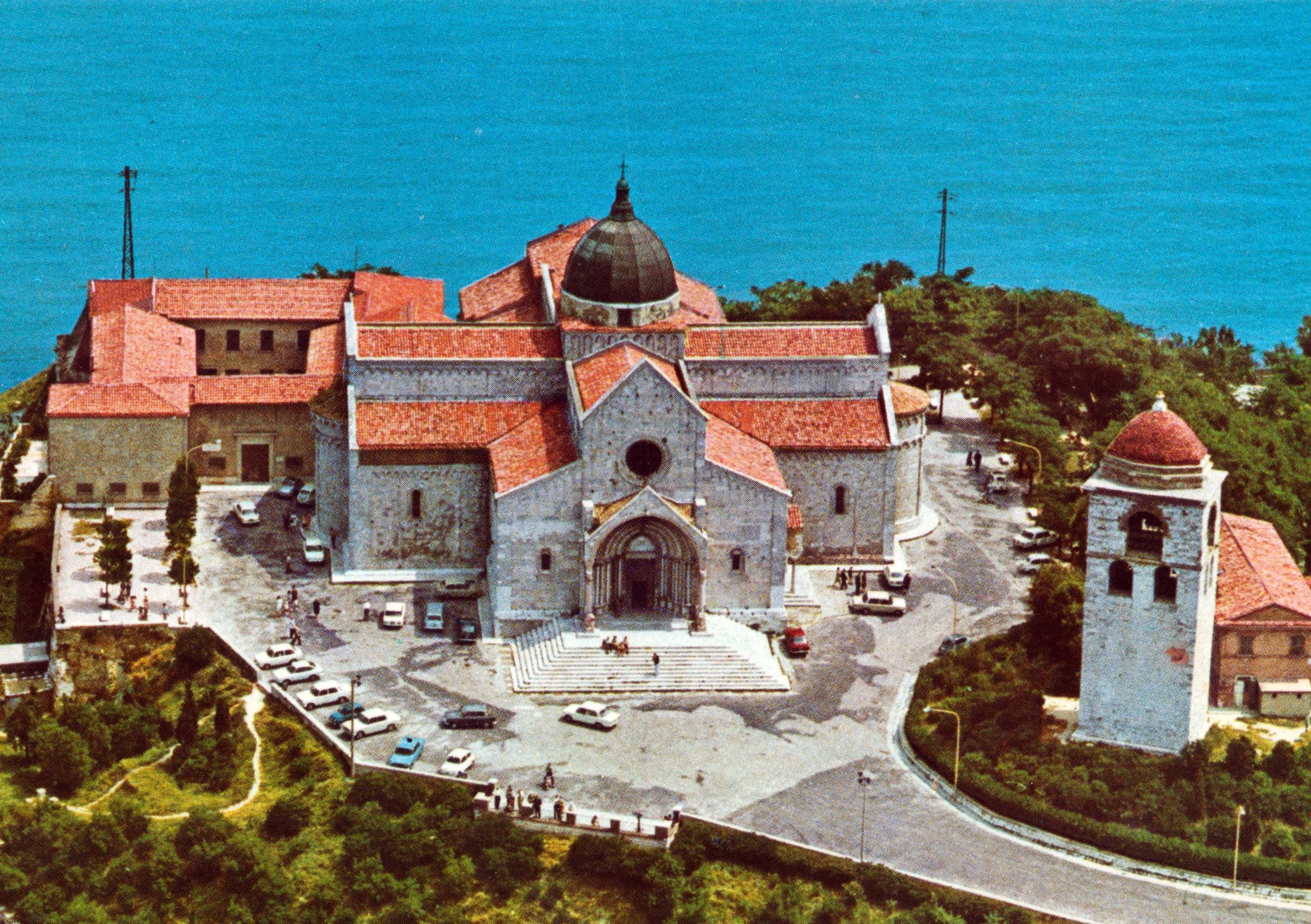
Cathedral of Ancona

During the Renaissance, the region was fought over by rival aristocratic families, such as the Malatesta of Rimini, Pesaro, Fano and the house of Montefeltro of Urbino. The last independent entity, the Duchy of Urbino, was dissolved in 1631, and from then on, Marche was firmly part of the Papal States, where many towns were governed by hereditary urban patriciates (see Civic nobility in the Papal States' March of Ancona).

The Napoleonic period saw the short-lived Republic of Ancona, in 1797–98; the merging of the region with the Roman Republic in 1798–99, and with the Kingdom of Italy from 1808 to 1813; and the short occupation by Joachim Murat in 1815. After Napoleon's defeat, Marche returned to Papal rule until 4 November 1860, when it was annexed to the unified Kingdom of Italy by a plebiscite.

The Bombardment of Ancona occurred during the Adriatic campaign of World War I. The 1916 Rimini earthquakes damaged or destroyed several buildings in Pesaro, Fano, and its hinterlands.

The Battle of Ancona occurred during the Italian campaign of World War II.

After the referendum of 2006, seven municipalities of Montefeltro were detached from the Province of Pesaro and Urbino to join the Province of Rimini (Emilia-Romagna) on 15 August 2009. The municipalities are Casteldelci, Maiolo, Novafeltria, Pennabilli, San Leo, Sant'Agata Feltria and Talamello.

Towns in Marche were devastated by many powerful earthquakes during the centuries, the last time in 2016 (in August and in October). In September 2022, Marche was hit by heavy flooding.

== Geography ==
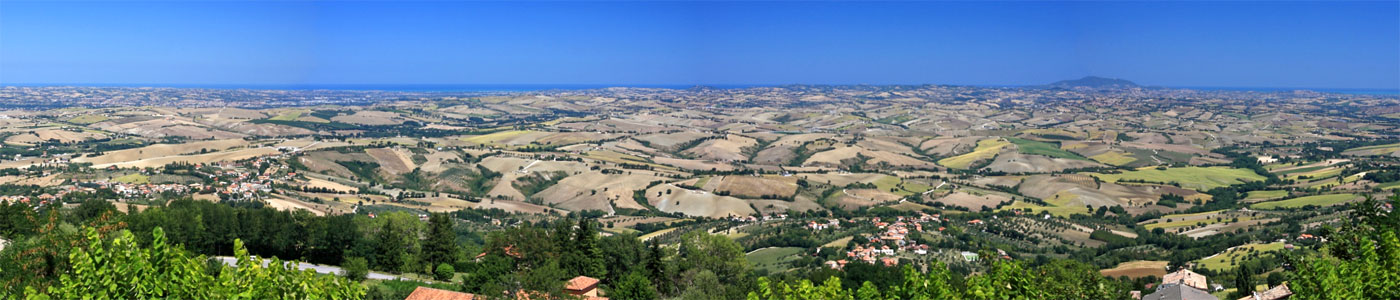
View of Marche countryside

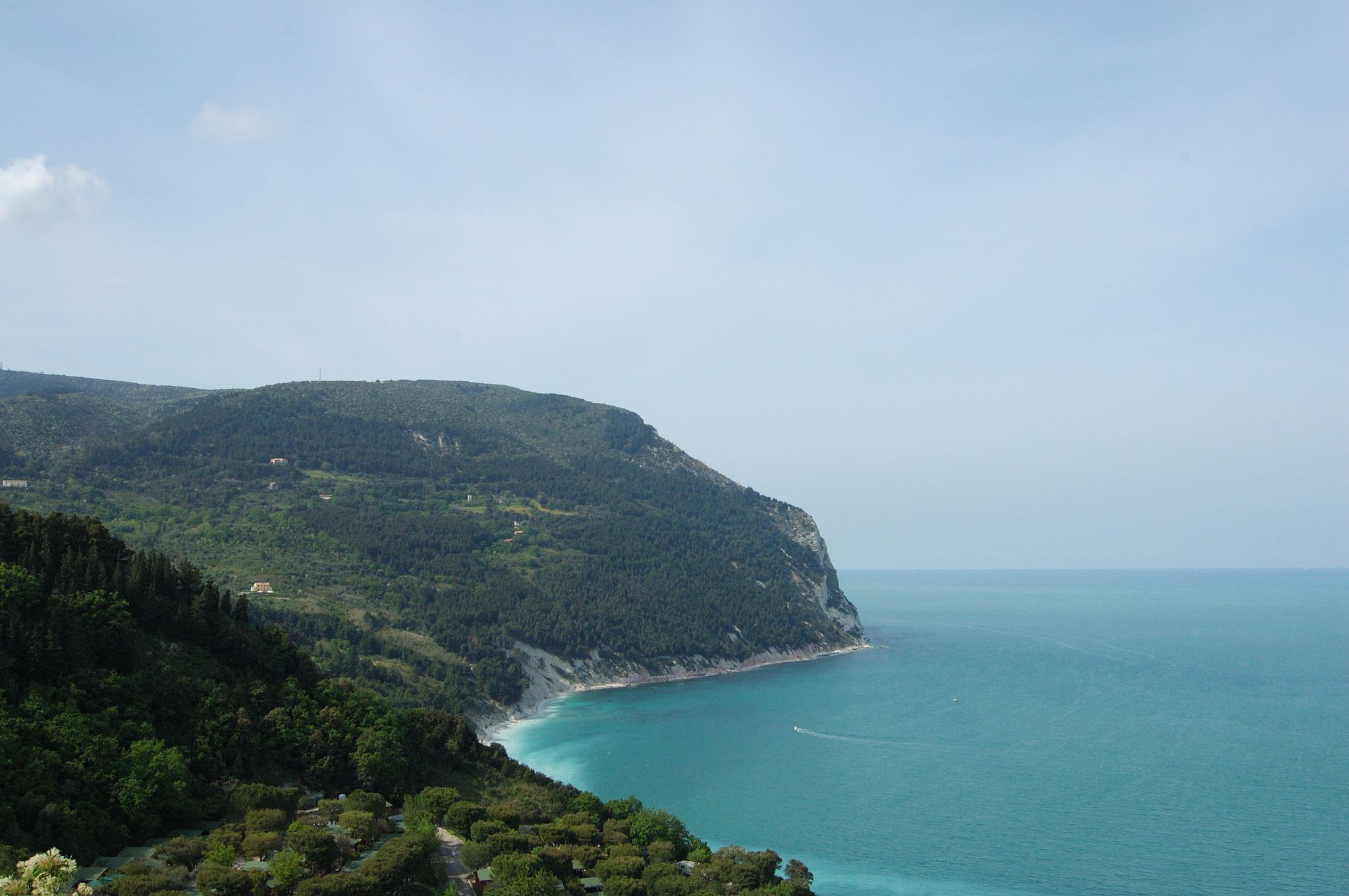
A view of Monte Conero

Marche extends over an area of 9,366 square kilometres (3,616 mi^{2}) of the central Adriatic slope between Emilia-Romagna to the north, Tuscany and Umbria to the west, and Lazio and Abruzzo to the south, the entire eastern boundary being formed by the Adriatic. The Umbrian enclave of Monte Ruperto (a subdivision of the comune of Città di Castello) is entirely surrounded by the Province of Pesaro and Urbino, which constitutes the northern part of the region.

Most of the region is mountainous or hilly: the Apennine range runs longitudinally along the region's eastern border and descends through a hilly landscape towards the Adriatic sea. With the sole exception of Monte Vettore, 2,476 metres (8,123 ft) high, the mountains do not exceed 2,400 metres (7,900 ft). The hilly area covers two-thirds of the region and is intersected by wide gullies with numerous short rivers and by alluvial plains perpendicular to the Appennini range. The main mountain range has a few deep river gorges: the best known are those of the Furlo, the Rossa and the Frasassi.

The coastline is 173 kilometres (107 mi) long and is relatively flat and straight except for the hilly area between Gabicce and Pesaro in the north, and the eastern slopes of Monte Conero near Ancona.

Climate is temperate. Inland, in the mountainous areas, is more continental with cold and often snowy winters; by the sea is more mediterranean. Precipitation varies from 1,000 to 1,500 millimetres (40 to 60 inches) per year inland and 600 to 800 mm (25 to 30 in) per year on the Adriatic coast.

A region with an annular drainage pattern possibly corresponding to a mud diapir or astrobleme exists near Sant'Angelo in Pontano.

As of 2023, according to the report on land consumption of the Higher Institute for Environmental Protection and Research, Marche and Liguria hold the Italian record for coastal overbuilding.

=== Mountains ===
- Croce di Monte Bove
- Monte Argentella
- Monte Bove Sud
- Monte Igno
- Monte Montiego
- Monte Porche
- Monte Strega
- Monte Vermenone
- Monte Vettore

== Demographics ==
Historical population (current borders)
Year	Pop.	±%
1861	889,490	—
1871	935,053	+5.1%
1881	948,133	+1.4%
1901	1,062,054	+12.0%
1911	1,116,399	+5.1%
1921	1,170,132	+4.8%
1931	1,208,391	+3.3%
1936	1,245,040	+3.0%
1951	1,330,352	+6.9%
1961	1,321,382	−0.7%
1971	1,340,444	+1.4%
1981	1,392,813	+3.9%
1991	1,409,876	+1.2%
2001	1,450,731	+2.9%
2011	1,538,699	+6.1%
2021	1,487,150	−3.4%
Source: ISTAT

As of 2026, the population is 1,479,832, of which 49.2% are male, and 50.8% are female. Minors make up 13.9% of the population, and seniors make up 27.0%.

The population density is 158.4 inhabitants per square kilometer, below the national figure of 195.1. Among the provinces, it is highest in the province of Ancona at 235.1 per square kilometer, and lowest in the province of Macerata at 108.5.

=== Migration ===
Between 1952 and 1967 the population of the region decreased by 1.7% as a result of a negative migration balance, well above the national average, with a rate varying between 4.9 and 10.0 per 1,000 inhabitants. In the same period the natural balance of the population was positive, but lower than the national average and insufficient to counterbalance the net emigration. The population continued to decline until 1971, but in 1968 began growing again.

As of 2025, immigrants make up 13.1% of the population. The 5 largest foreign countries of birth are Albania, Romania, Morocco, Ukraine, and Pakistan.

Foreign population by country of birth (2025)
Country of birth	Population
Albania	23,762
Romania	21,614
Morocco	12,949
Ukraine	8,114
Pakistan	7,937
Bangladesh	7,403
Moldova	6,959
China	6,422
Argentina	6,329
North Macedonia	5,983
Switzerland	5,436
Tunisia	5,005
Peru	4,499
India	4,482
Germany	4,245

== Government and politics ==
Marche forms, along with Emilia-Romagna, Tuscany and Umbria, the Italian "Red Quadrilateral", a strongly left-wing area. In the 2014 European elections, the people of Marche gave 45% of their votes to Matteo Renzi's Democratic Party.

As of the 2025 Marche regional election Marche is governed by the centre-right coalition.

=== Administrative divisions ===
The region is divided into five provinces: Ancona, Ascoli Piceno, Fermo, Macerata, and Pesaro and Urbino.

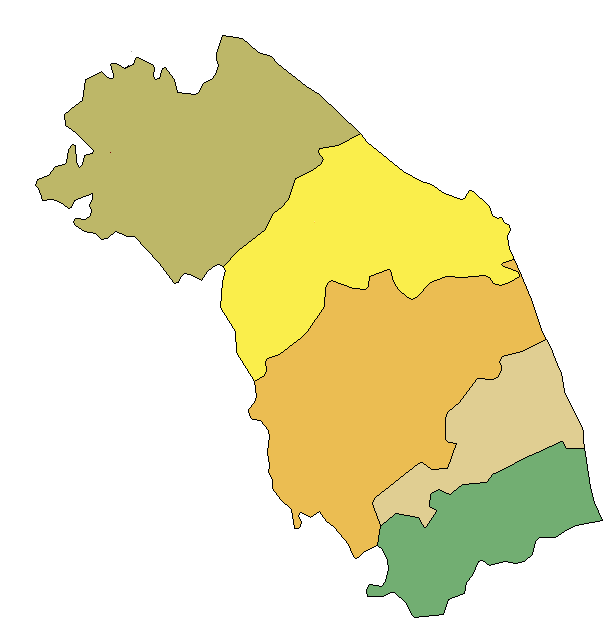

Province	Population (2026)	Area (km^{2})	Density (inh./km^{2})	Municipalities
Province of Ancona	461,613	1,963.22	235.1	47
Province of Ascoli Piceno	200,202	1,228.27	163.0	33
Province of Fermo	166,772	862.77	193.3	40
Province of Macerata	301,689	2,779.34	108.5	55
Province of Pesaro and Urbino	349,556	2,510.89	139.2	50

== Economy ==
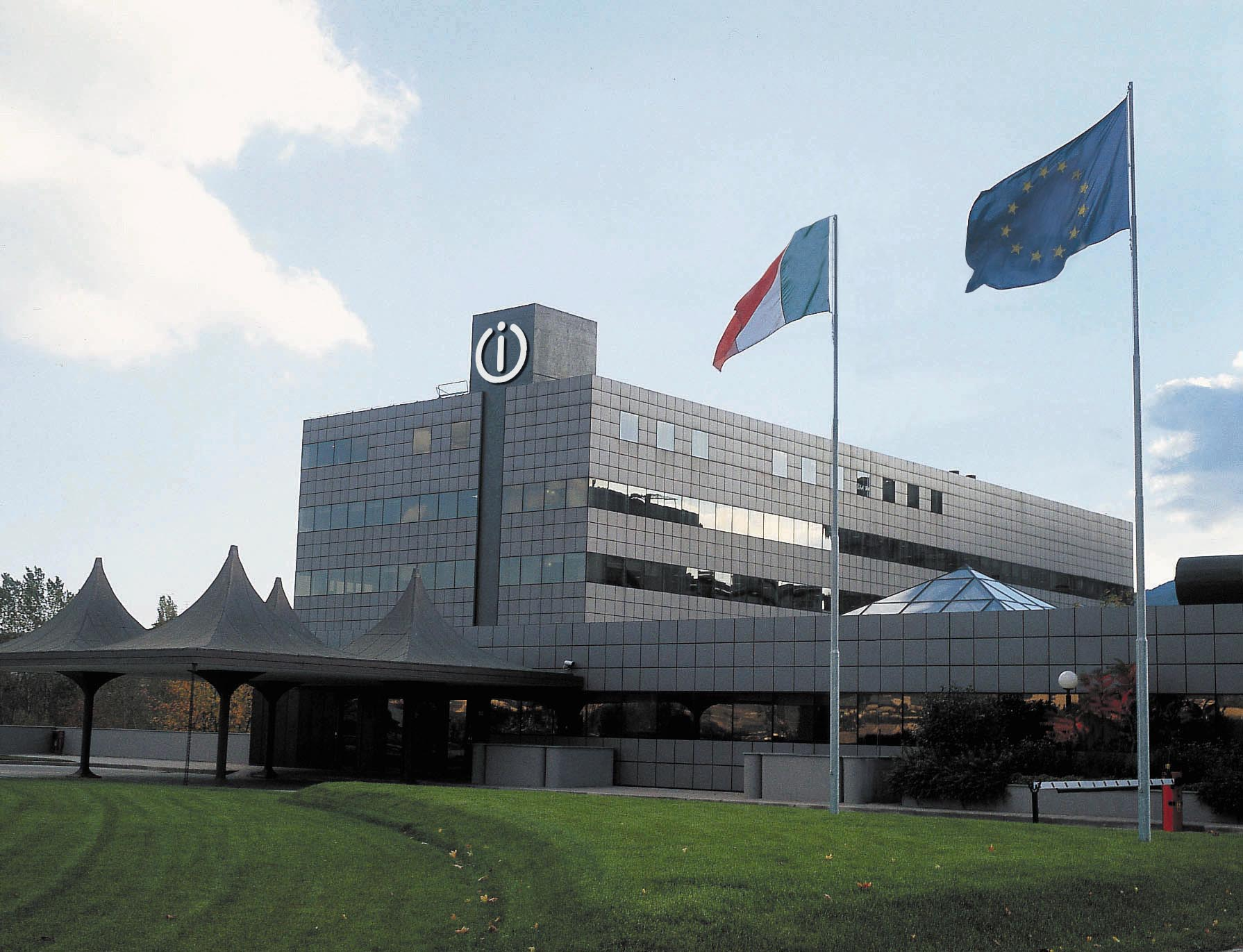
Indesit Headquarters in Fabriano, Province of Ancona. The home appliance sector represents the core of the regional industry

Prior to the 1970s, Marche was considered a rather poor region, although economically stable in some sectors, thanks particularly to its agricultural output and to the contribution of traditional crafts.

Today the contribution of agriculture to the economy of the region is less significant and the gross value generated by this sector remains slightly above the national average. Marche has never suffered from the extremes of fragmented land ownership or 'latifondo'. Greatly diffused in the past, the sharecropping never produced an extreme land fragmentation. The main products are cereals, vegetables, animal products and grapes. Truffle hunting is popular; although it has often led to 'truffle wars' between hunters due to the imposition of quotas. Olives are also produced and managed by various harvesters. In spite of the marine impoverishment, the sea has always furnished a plentiful supply of fish, the main fishing centres being Ancona, San Benedetto del Tronto, Fano and Civitanova Marche.

Since the 1980s, the economy of the region has been radically transformed without, however, repudiating its rural past. Many of the small craft workshops scattered throughout the rural settlements have modernised and become small businesses, some of which have become major brands known all over the world (Indesit, Tod's, Guzzini, Teuco). This evolution led to the emergence of 'specialized' industrial areas, which are still profitable:

- footwear and leather goods in a large area straddling the provinces of Macerata and Fermo;
- furniture in the Pesaro area in particular;
- household appliances and textile industry in the province of Ancona, in which the main engineering companies are also to be found (including ship building, petrochemicals and paper, as well as consumer durables).
- The city of Castelfidardo remains an important centre for the production of musical instruments, the accordion in particular.

The gross domestic product (GDP) of the region was 43.3 billion euros in 2018, accounting for 2.5% of Italy's economic output. GDP per capita adjusted for purchasing power was 28,200 euros or 94% of the EU27 average in the same year. The GDP per employee was 96% of the EU average.

The unemployment rate stood at 7.4% in 2020. Marche is well known for its shoemaking tradition, with fine and luxurious Italian footwear manufacturing facilities in the region.

=== Tourism ===
The region continues to draw tourists, whose increasing numbers have been attracted by the rich and broadly distributed heritage of history and monuments, as well as by the traditional seaside resorts. Marche has many small and picturesque villages, 31 of them have been selected by I Borghi più belli d'Italia (English: The most beautiful Villages of Italy), a non-profit private association of small Italian towns of strong historical and artistic interest, that was founded on the initiative of the Tourism Council of the National Association of Italian Municipalities.

=== Transport ===
The region is served by Marche Airport which provides direct routes to other parts of Italy and Europe. Other airports such as Bologna Guglielmo Marconi Airport, Florence Airport, Perugia San Francesco d'Assisi – Umbria International Airport, and Rimini Fellini Airport are also used by air travellers from the region.

== See also ==
- Northern Italy
