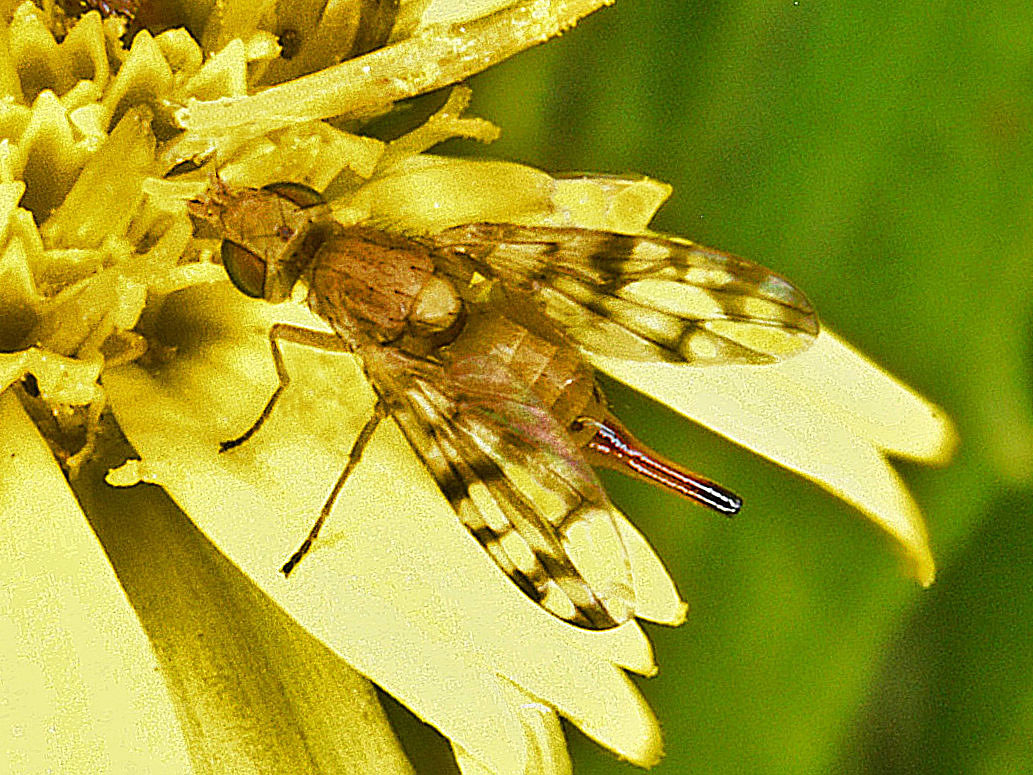
- Myopites stylatus. Female on Dittrichia viscosa

Scientific classification
- Kingdom: Animalia
- Phylum: Arthropoda
- Clade: Pancrustacea
- Class: Insecta
- Order: Diptera
- Family: Tephritidae
- Subfamily: Tephritinae
- Tribe: Myopitini
- Genus: Myopites
- Species: M. stylatus

Binomial name
- Myopites stylatus (Fabricius, 1794)

Synonyms
- Stomoxys stylata Fabricius, 1794

= Myopites stylatus =

Species of fly

Myopites stylatus is a species of tephritid or fruit flies in the family Tephritidae.

== Distribution ==
This species is present in Europe (Albania, Bulgaria, Croatia, Slovenia, France and Italy), in the Near East and in North Africa.

== Description ==
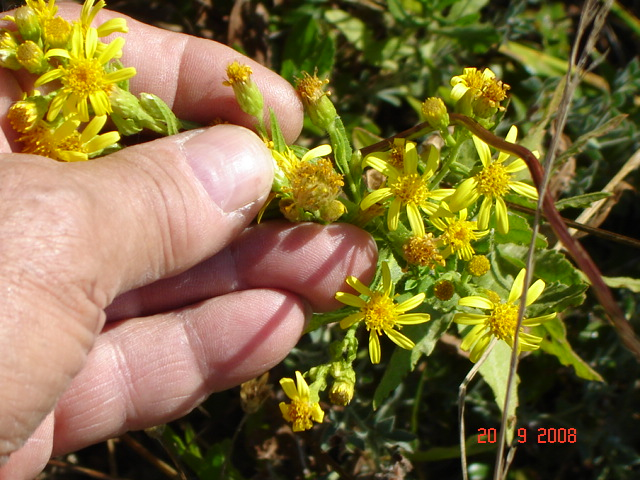
Gall of Myopites stylatus under development on Dittrichia viscosa

Myopites stylatus can reach a length of about 3 millimetres (0.12 in). These small tephritids have a yellow or pale brown mesonotum, a long oviscape and smooth or tuberculate aculeus in the females.

== Biology ==
Myopites stylatus forms galls on Dittrichia viscosa and its larvae are parasitized by several hymenopteran species, especially by the olive fruit fly (Bactrocera oleae), an important pests of olive crops.
