= Monte Igno =

Mountain in Italy

- Location within Italy

Highest point
- Elevation: 1,435 m (4,708 ft)
- Prominence: 475 m (1,558 ft)
- Coordinates: 43°05′35″N 12°59′20″E

Geography
- Location: Marche, Italy
- Parent range: Apennines

Monte Igno is a mountain in Marche, Italy.

Monte Igno is a relief in the 'Umbria-Marche Apennines, located in the town of Serravalle di Chienti, near the border of the 'Umbria. The Camerte countryside dominates, but being north of the Chienti river, it does not belong to the Sibillini sub-chain, which starts just south of the aforementioned watercourse.

The 750 m difference in height between the slopes where the hamlet of Gelagna Alta is located and the summit facilitates a variety of vegetation and landscape.

In anticyclone days, the valleys of the Esino and Potenza rivers can be viewed from its summit towards the north. Monte San Vicino can also be spotted. To the south, beyond the Valdichienti, the Sibillini mountains are noticeable. To the west lie the highlands of Colfiorito. On clear days, Monte Subasio can also be seen westwards. On the east, a good part of the central Adriatic can be seen.
