= Lac de l'Argentella =

Reservoir on Corsica, France

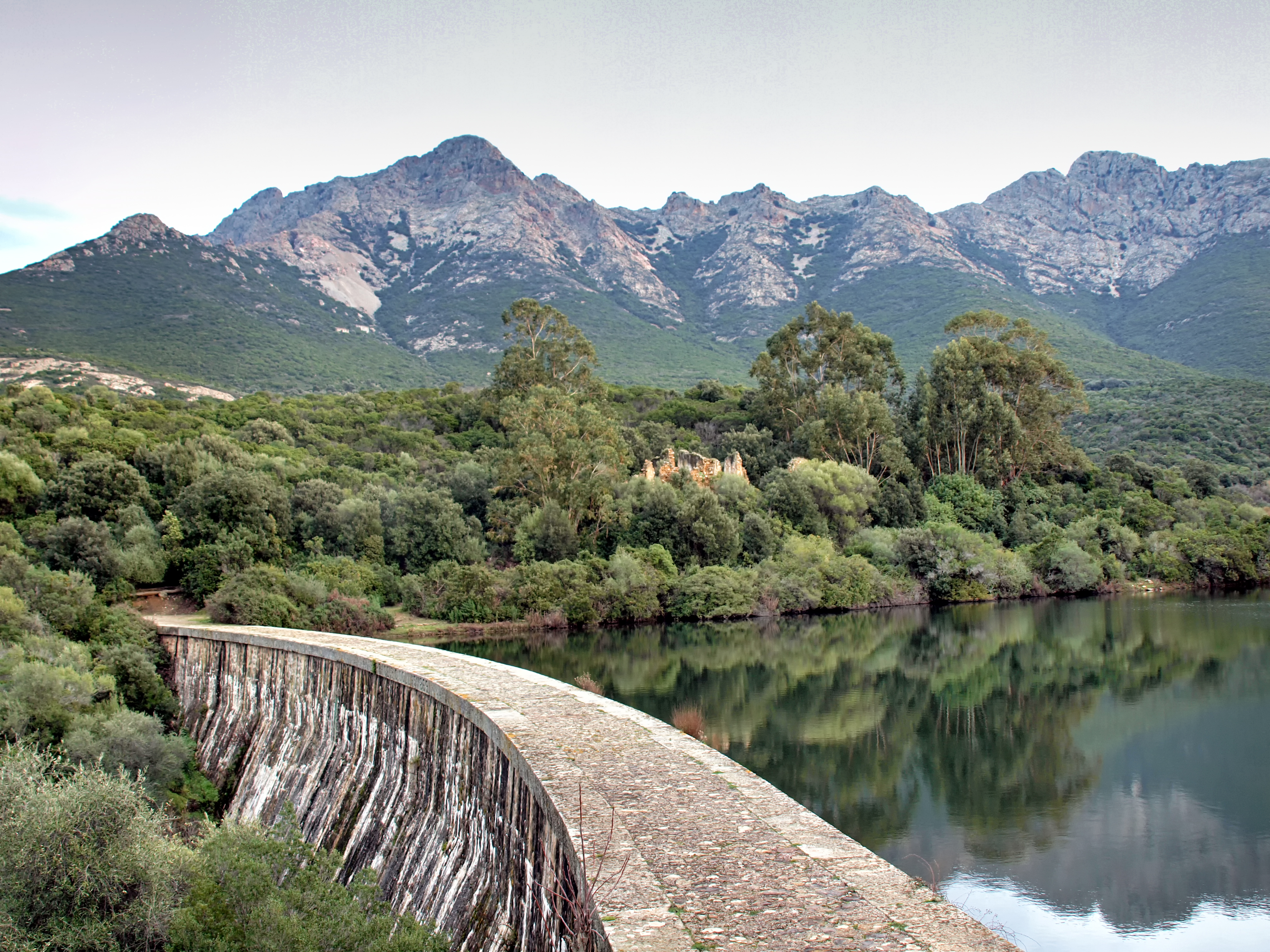
- Dam and part of the lake

- Location within Corsica Location within France
- Location: Corsica
- Coordinates: 42°27′38″N 8°41′08″E
- Type: Reservoir
- Basin countries: France

The Lac de l'Argentella is a reservoir in the Haute-Corse department of Corsica, France. It was built in the 1870s to supply water to the ore processing plant of the Argentella mines, which refined silver and copper ore extracted from the nearby Capu di l'Argentella. After a few years the ore supply became uneconomical, and eventually the mines were closed in the 1930s. Recently there has been discussion on what to do with the aging dam. It stores water in a dry region, but may be unsafe.

== Location ==
The Lac de l'Argentella is in the commune of Galéria just south of its border with the commune of Calenzana. It is southeast of the village of L'Argentella on the south coast of the Baie de Crovani. The Argentella lake and mines can be reached from the D81b coast road from Calvi to Galéria. A dirt road leads to the ruined buildings, of which a chimney is still visible, and the lake is ten minutes away by foot. The mining galleries are at the foot of the Capu di l'Argentella about 40 minutes walk from the buildings at an elevation of 813 metres (2,667 ft).

== Hydrology ==
The lake is at an altitude of 45 metres (148 ft). The dam is 20 metres (66 ft) high. It is 144 metres (472 ft) wide and can hold 80,000 cubic metres (2,800,000 cu ft). The lake covers 2.37 hectares (5.9 acres). The 2.31 kilometres (1.44 mi) Ruisseau de Chierchiu, a stream, enters the reservoir from the south and leaves it to the north. The Chierchiu is a tributary of the 3.23 kilometres (2.01 mi) Ruisseau de Cardiccia, which it joins just after leaving the dam, and which enters the sea to the north of L'Argentella.

== Ecology ==
The reservoir has low biological importance. Flora include yellow fleabane (Dittrichia viscosa), blue gum (Eucalyptus globulus), rose (Rubus) species and rough bindweed (Smilax aspera). Birds include Eurasian jay (Garrulus glandarius). Reptiles include green whip snake (Hierophis viridiflavus). Fish include European eel (Anguilla anguilla), common carp (Cyprinus carpio) and largemouth bass (Micropterus salmoides).

== Mining operation ==
The Argentella silver and copper mine was probably first exploited before the 17th century. Exploitation resumed in 1846.

Around 1870 C. Collas, a wealthy investor, acquired the mine and at great expense set up a large factory to process the ore and a dam to supply water, which were built by the well-known engineers Huet and Geyler. The ore processing plant covered almost 3,000 cubic metres (110,000 cu ft). Buildings were erected to house several hundred workers, as well as offices, stores, powder magazines and other facilities spread over an area of almost 150 hectares (370 acres).

At the mine there are about twenty tunnel entrances, mostly exploratory, and a large open pit trench 170 metres (560 ft) long, 5–10 metres (16–33 ft) wide and up to 30 metres (98 ft) deep. Overhead cables were installed to transport ore with a high silver content more than 2 kilometres (1.2 mi) from the Grande Tranchée to the washing facility.

The ore supply began to dry up after a few years. An English company bought the mine in 1886, and Argentella Mining Limited worked the deposit for two years, employing up to 200 workers. Other attempts were made in the years that followed, but in 1898 most of the equipment was sold. The copper concession passed through various hands, but on 24 January 1964 the concession was forfeited.

== Later developments ==
The dam became the property of the Moncale and Calinzana communes after industrial exploitation had ended. The safety of the aging structure became a concern as there are houses and a campsite downstream, which could be flooded if it burst. In 2015 the engineering firm SAFEGE undertook a study. Three options were considered: totally destroying the dam, restoring it, or creating an arch in it through which the Chierchiu stream could flow. At first the arch option was chosen as the least bad of the three, preserving some of the architectural legacy but avoiding the reconstruction cost.

During the drought of the summer of 2017 this was reconsidered, since destroying a reservoir in an arid zone during a water crisis did not seem a reasonable option, and farmers were asking if the water could be used for agriculture. As of 2018 studies were being conducted to confirm the quality of the stored water and the watershed, where the old mine had extracted heavy metals, mainly lead, silver and copper.

== Gallery ==
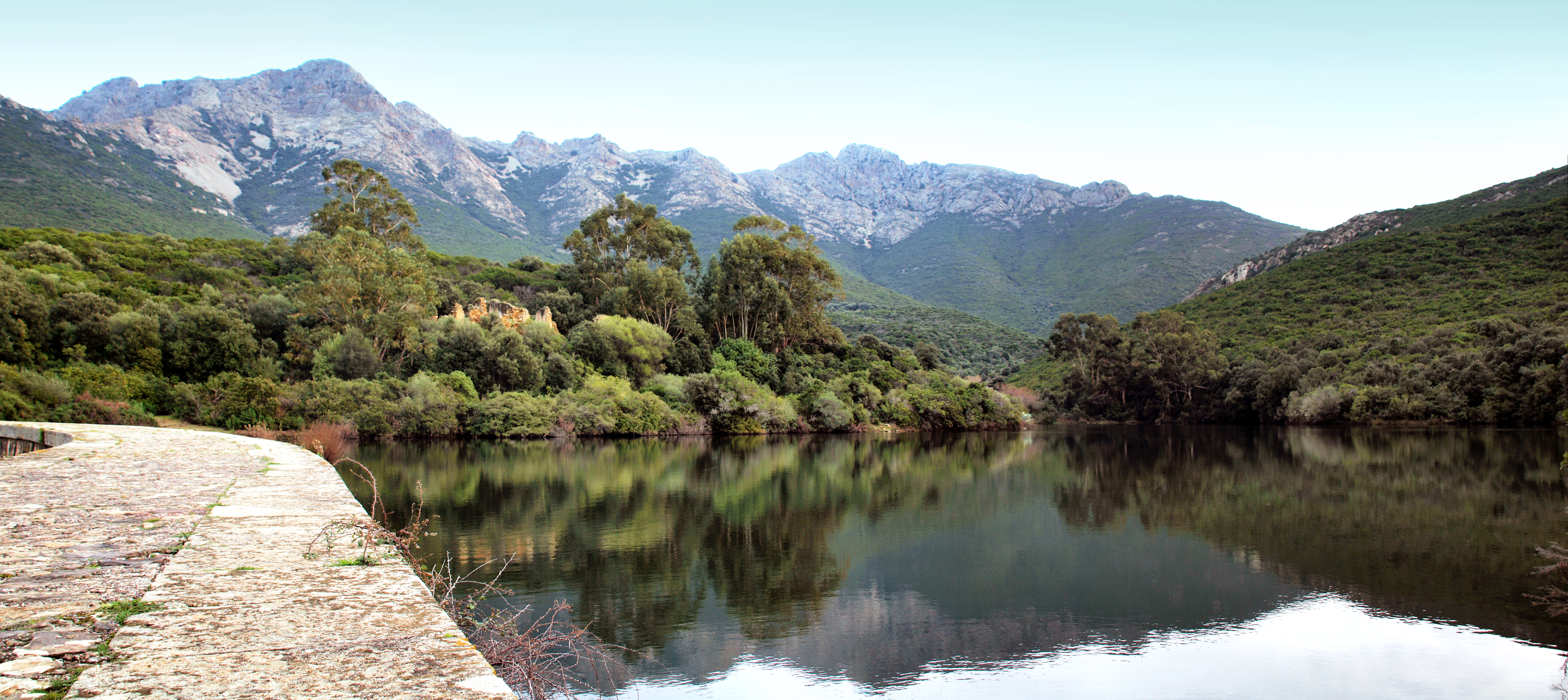
The lake from the dam

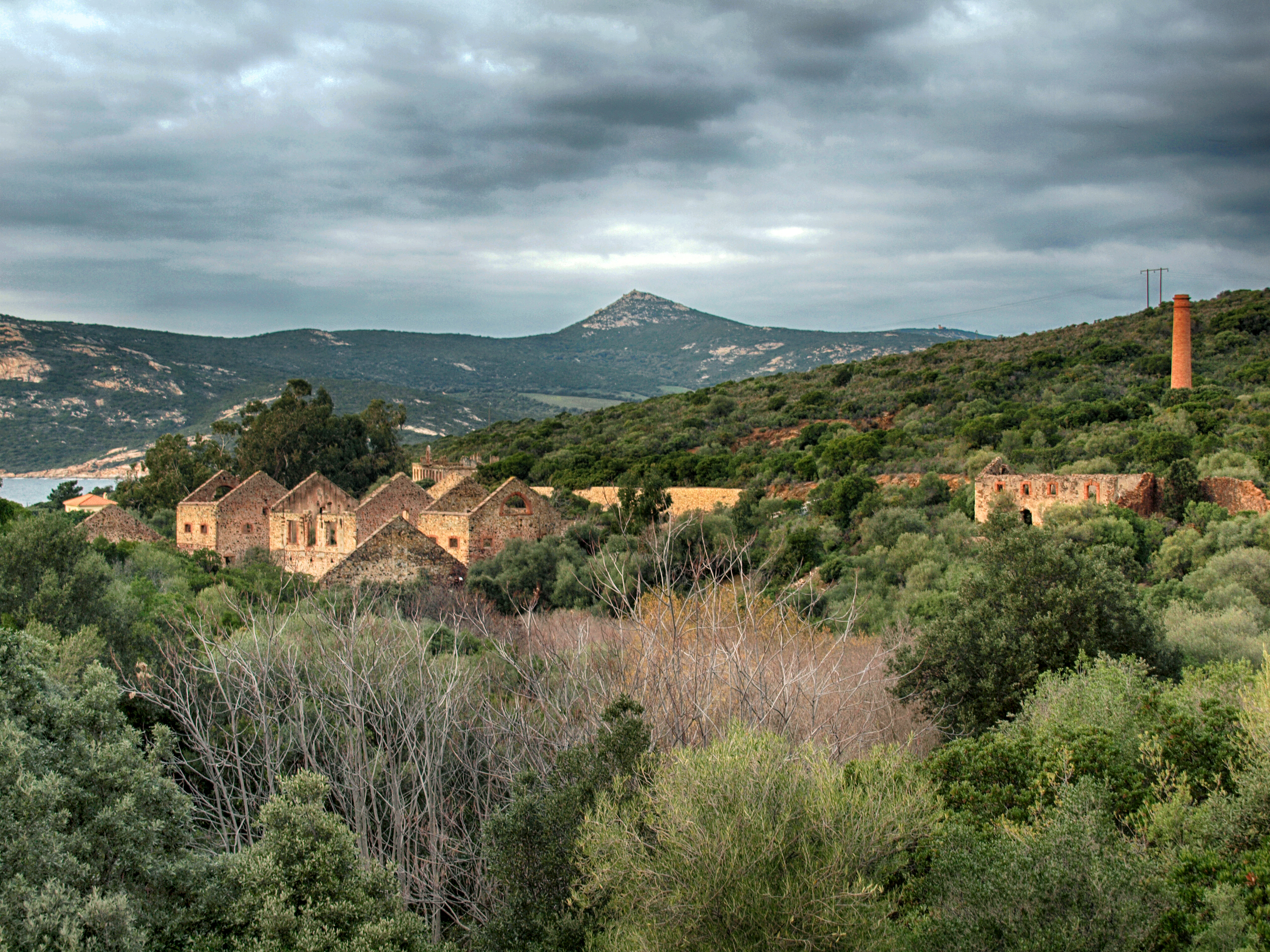
Ruins of the Argentella plant

== Sources ==
- Bauché, Alain; Caude, Geoffroy; Saillard, Michel; Sorro, Jean-François (December 2016), Audit de la mise en œuvre de la politique de prévention des risques naturels et technologiques en région Corse (PDF) (in French), CGEDD
- Calenzana, Florian Leleu (8 January 2021), Les mines et le lac de l'Argentella (in French), Corse: ADLFI. Archéologie de la France - Informations
- FR834COR343 - Lac de barrage de l'Argentella (in French), Initiative PIM, Office de l’Environnement de la Corse (OEC), 2019
- "Lac de l'Argentella", Marre de la pluie (in French)
- Lançon-Paoli, Isabelle (26 January 2018), "Barrage de l'Argentella : une probable reconversion", corsematin (in French)
- "Les mines de l'Argentella", ArkeMine (in French), archived from the original on 2021-12-06
- "Ruisseau de Cardiccia", Sandre (in French)
- "Ruisseau de Chierchiu", Sandre (in French)
- "Way: Lac de l'Argentella (220137357)", OpenStreetMap
