= Myopites longirostris =

Scientific classification
- Kingdom: Animalia
- Phylum: Arthropoda
- Class: Insecta
- Order: Diptera
- Family: Tephritidae
- Subfamily: Tephritinae
- Tribe: Myopitini
- Genus: Myopites
- Species: M. longirostris

Binomial name
- Myopites longirostris (Loew, 1846)

Synonyms
- Trypeta longirostris Loew, 1846; Myopites frauenfeldi Schiner, 1862; Nygmatia stylata Hendel, 1927; Stylia mentharum Robineau-Desvoidy, 1830

Species of fly

Myopites longirostris is a species of tephritid or fruit flies in the genus Myopites of the family Tephritidae.

== Distribution ==
Italy, Croatia, France.
