= Bové =

Bové may refer to:

- José Bové (born 1953), French farmer, politician and syndicalist
- Joseph Bové (1784–1834), Russian architect
- Marie Bové (born 1975), French politician
- Paul Bové (born 1949), American academic and writer

== See also ==
- Bove, a surname (including a list of people with the name)
- Boves (disambiguation)
- Bovee (disambiguation)
