= Inno delle Marche =

Official hymn of the region Marche

The Inno delle Marche is the official hymn of the Italian region of Marche. Written by the Italian composer Giovanni Allevi, on behalf of regional authorities, it was officially performed for the first time on 1 September 2007 in the town of Loreto. It is one of the few anthems without lyrics.

In 2013, the Marche region decided to add words to the "Inno delle Marche" and appointed a committee, of which Giulio Rapetti, professionally known as Mogol, took part to choose the best words among all of the participants of the official public contest. The committee's choice fell on the words written by Giacomo Greganti from the Marche Region, and the BTwins, two of Mogol's pupils, were chosen to perform the piece. And it was Mogol himself, who during the celebrations of the "Giornata delle Marche" held on 10 December 2013 at San Benedetto del Tronto, inaugurated the performance of the anthem sung by the twins from Ascoli Piceno.
