= Monte Montiego =

Mountain in Italy

- Location within Italy

Highest point
- Elevation: 975 m (3,199 ft)
- Coordinates: 43°36′07″N 12°31′26″E

Geography
- Location: Marche, Italy
- Parent range: Apennines

Monte Montiego is a mountain of Marche, Italy. It is 975 metres high. Mountain hiking is a popular activity.

Part of the mountain's rock surfaces are at the Upper Eocene and Lower Oligocene boundary, which includes fossils.
