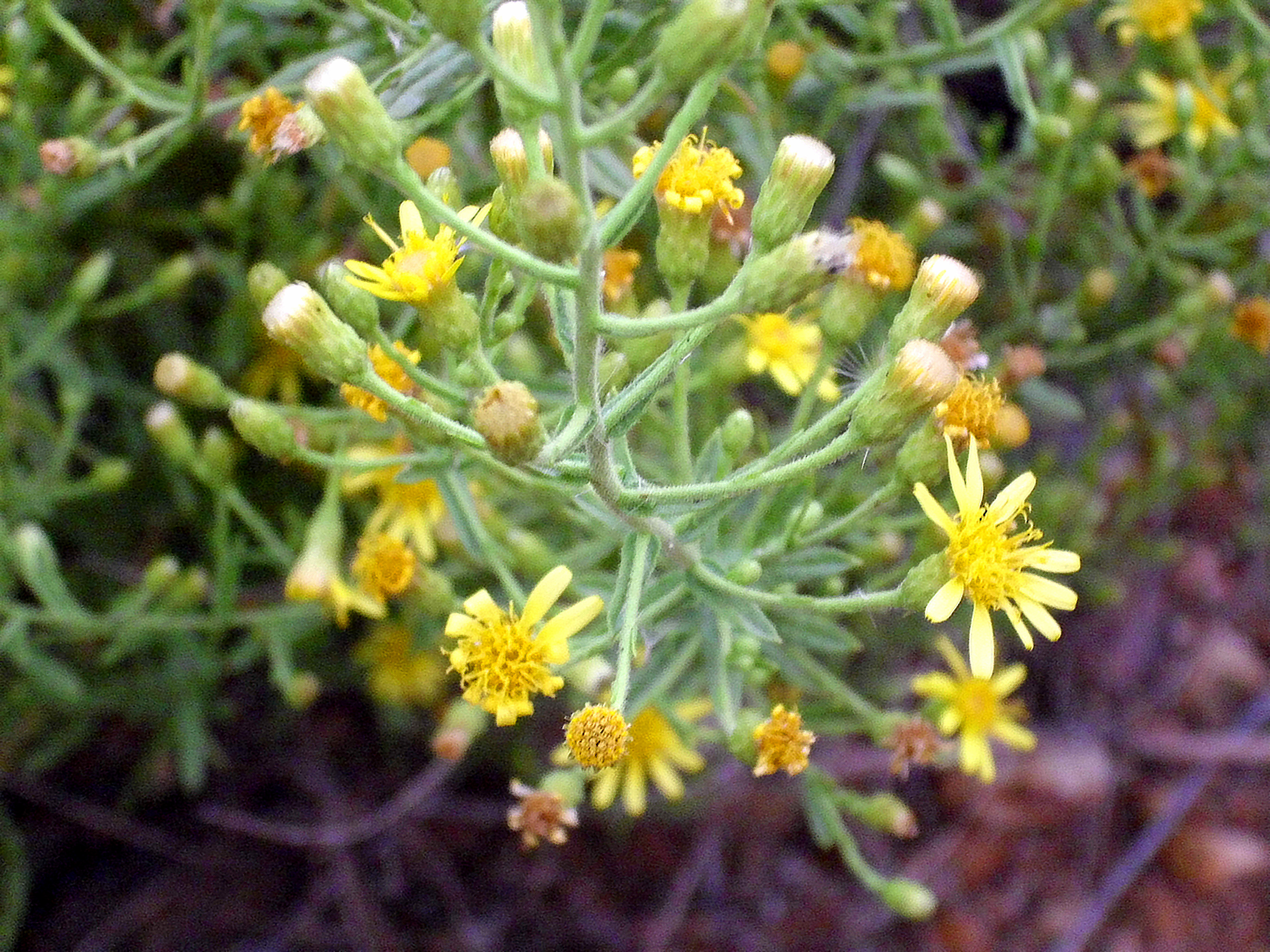

Scientific classification
- Kingdom: Plantae
- Clade: Embryophytes
- Clade: Tracheophytes
- Clade: Spermatophytes
- Clade: Angiosperms
- Clade: Eudicots
- Clade: Asterids
- Order: Asterales
- Family: Asteraceae
- Genus: Dittrichia
- Species: D. viscosa

Binomial name
- Dittrichia viscosa (L.) Greuter, 1973

Synonyms
- Synonymy: Erigeron viscosus L. 1753; Inula viscosa (L.) Aiton; Cupularia viscosa (L.) Gren. & Godr.; Chrysocoma camphorata Robill. & Castagne; Chrysocoma saxatilis DC.; Chrysocoma verticalis Lag.; Conyza major Bubani; Jacobaea viscosa (L.) Merino; Dittrichia orientalis Brullo & De Marco, syn of subsp. angustifolia; Dittrichia maritima Brullo & De Marco, syn of subsp. maritima; Dittrichia revoluta (Hoffmanns. & Link) Brullo & De Marco, syn of subsp. revoluta; Inula prostrata Rothm., syn of subsp. revoluta; Inula revoluta Hoffmanns. & Link, syn of subsp. revoluta; Pulicaria revoluta (Hoffmanns. & Link) Nyman, syn of subsp. revoluta

= Dittrichia viscosa =

Species of flowering plant

Dittrichia viscosa, also known as false yellowhead, woody fleabane, sticky fleabane and yellow fleabane, is a flowering plant in the daisy family.

Dittrichia viscosa is a highly branching perennial common throughout the Mediterranean Basin. It has long, narrow leaves that are pointed at both ends and have teeth along the edges and glandular hairs on the surfaces. One plant can produce many yellow flower heads each with as many as 16 ray florets and 44 disc florets.

Originally, the species was found mainly in dry riverbeds and abandoned fields up to a 1500 m (5000 feet) elevation. Nowadays it is quite common in roadsides and ruderal habitats, even in urban areas. It is considered an invasive species in Australia. The false yellowhead is a tough plant, very resistant to adverse conditions and degraded environments. It is important as food for the caterpillars of certain butterflies and moths, like Iolana iolas. The galls of the plants also are habitat for Myopites stylatus and Myopites inulaedyssentericae, whose larvae are hosts to parasitic hymenoptera such as Eupelmus urozonus who are also major parasites of the olive fly, helping control its population. This may be cause for its name in Catalan: Olivarda.

Despite the fresh-looking green color of its leaves and its attractive inflorescence, this plant is sticky and has a certain smell that most people find unpleasant. It contains an essential oil and has been used in traditional medicine since ancient times, especially in the Levant, as an astringent.

In Elba Island and Corsica it is now used by residents and tourists to heal stings from jellyfish, bees and wasps pressing fresh leaves on the skin with quick results. It is called in local dialect pescida.

A yellow dye substance has, since ancient times, been produced from its roots.

It is an important plant in Catalan tradition, often mentioned in adages and proverbs. One adage says that: "No vos 'nemoreu, amor, de cap fadrina gallarda que és com la flor d'olivarda molt guapa, i dolenta d'olor." [My dear one, don't fall in love with any woman who only has good looks, she is like a false yellowhead flower: beautiful, but full of stench.]

Subspecies

- Dittrichia viscosa subsp. angustifolia (Bég.) Greuter
- Dittrichia viscosa subsp. maritima (Brullo & De Marco) Greuter
- Dittrichia viscosa subsp. revoluta (Hoffmanns. & Link) P.Silva & Tutin
- Dittrichia viscosa subsp. viscosa

== Leaves, flowers and fruits ==
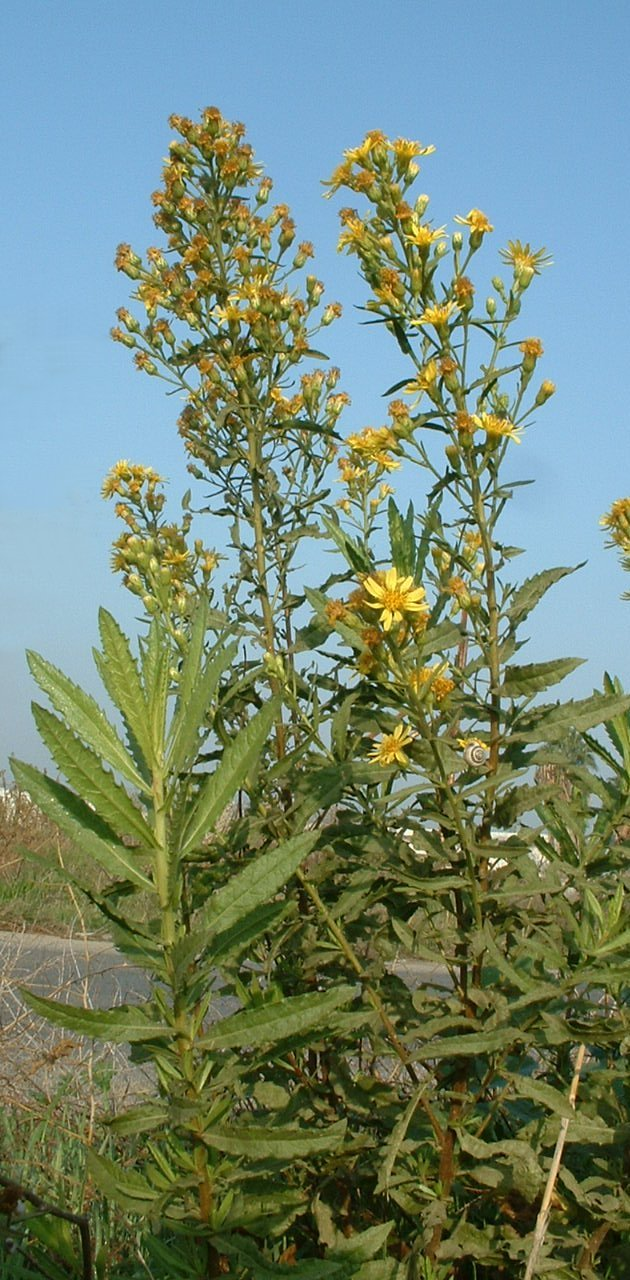
Dittrichia viscosa habitus

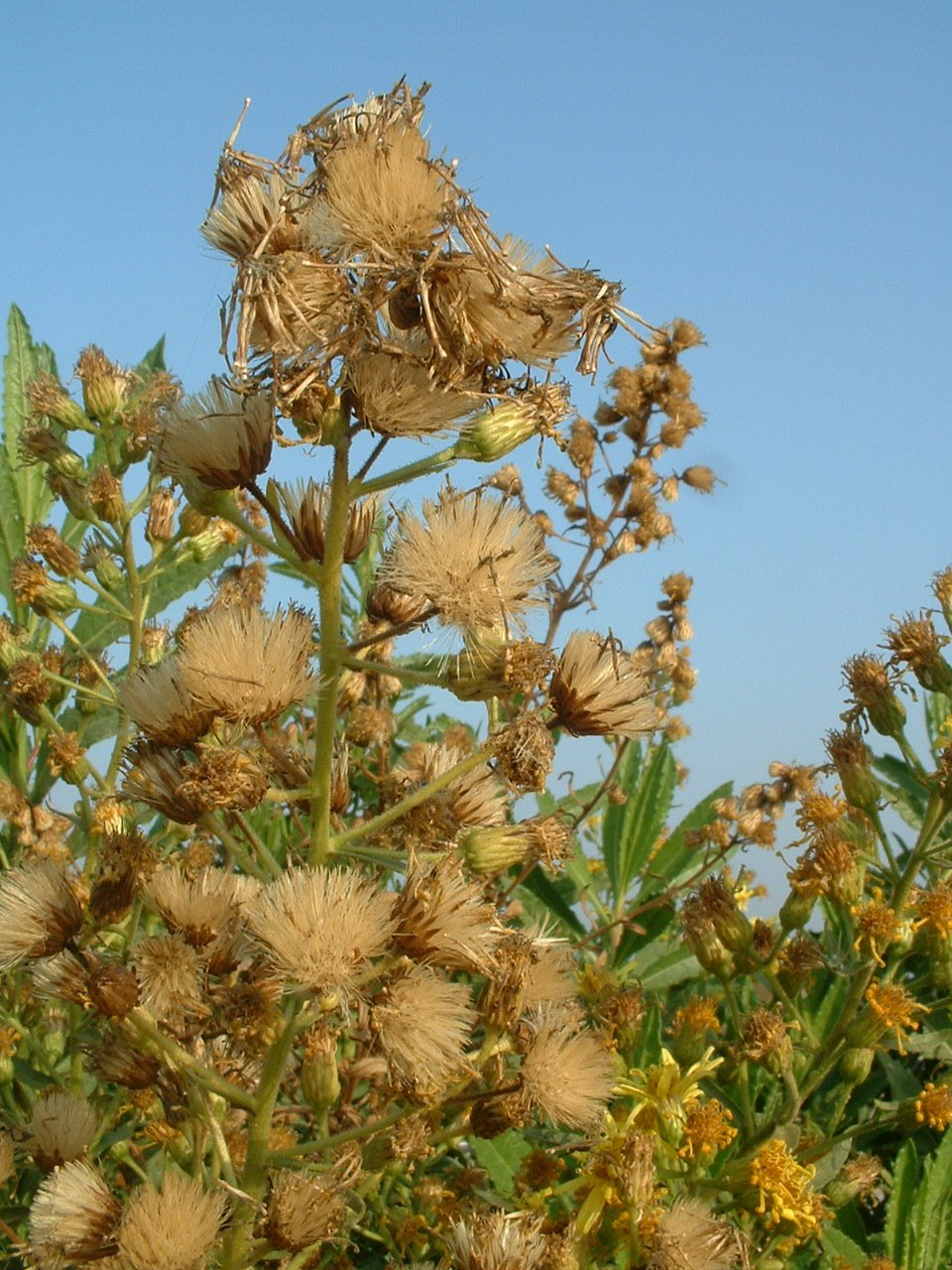
Seed heads

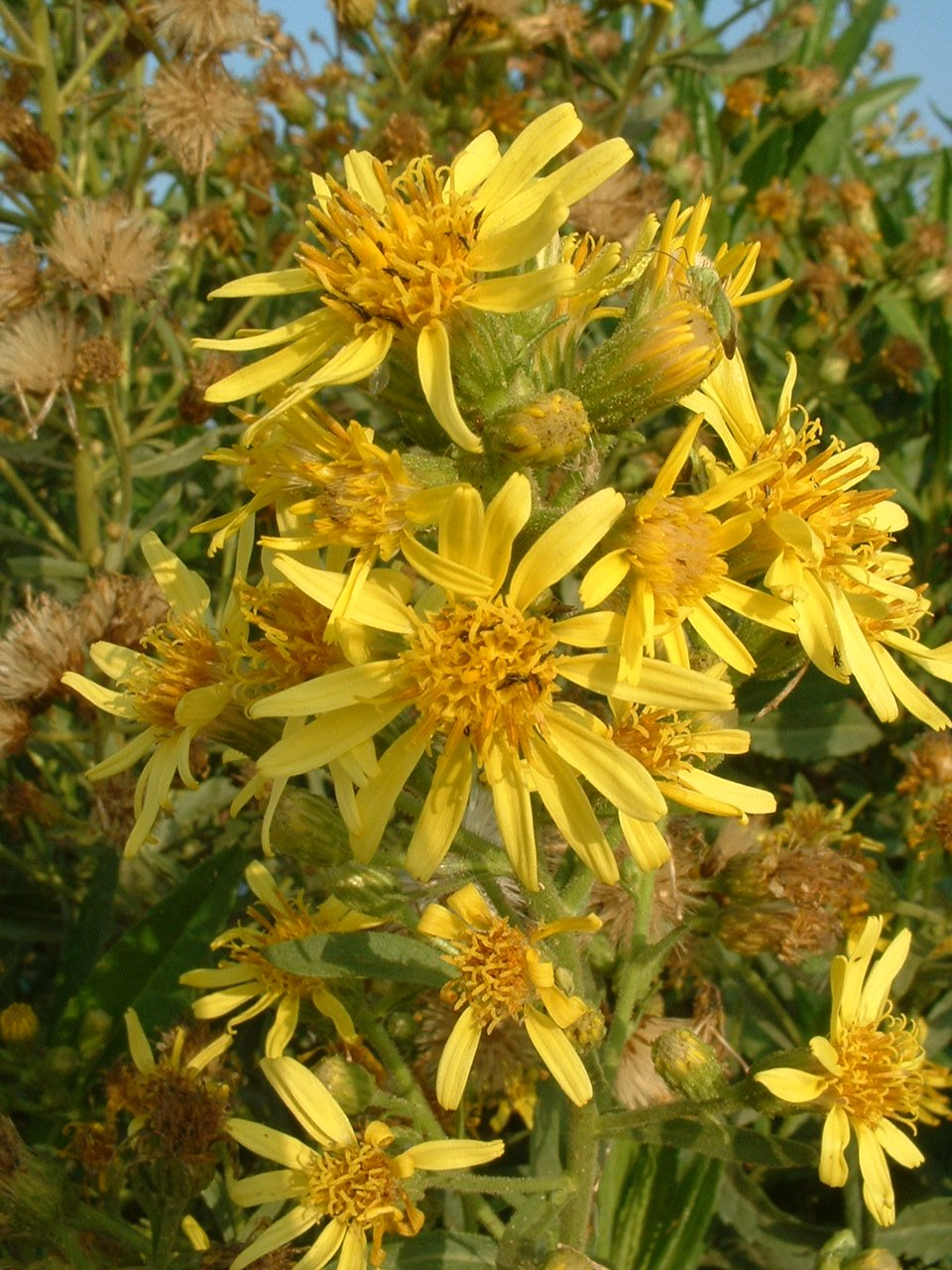
Dittrichia viscosa. Flowerheads

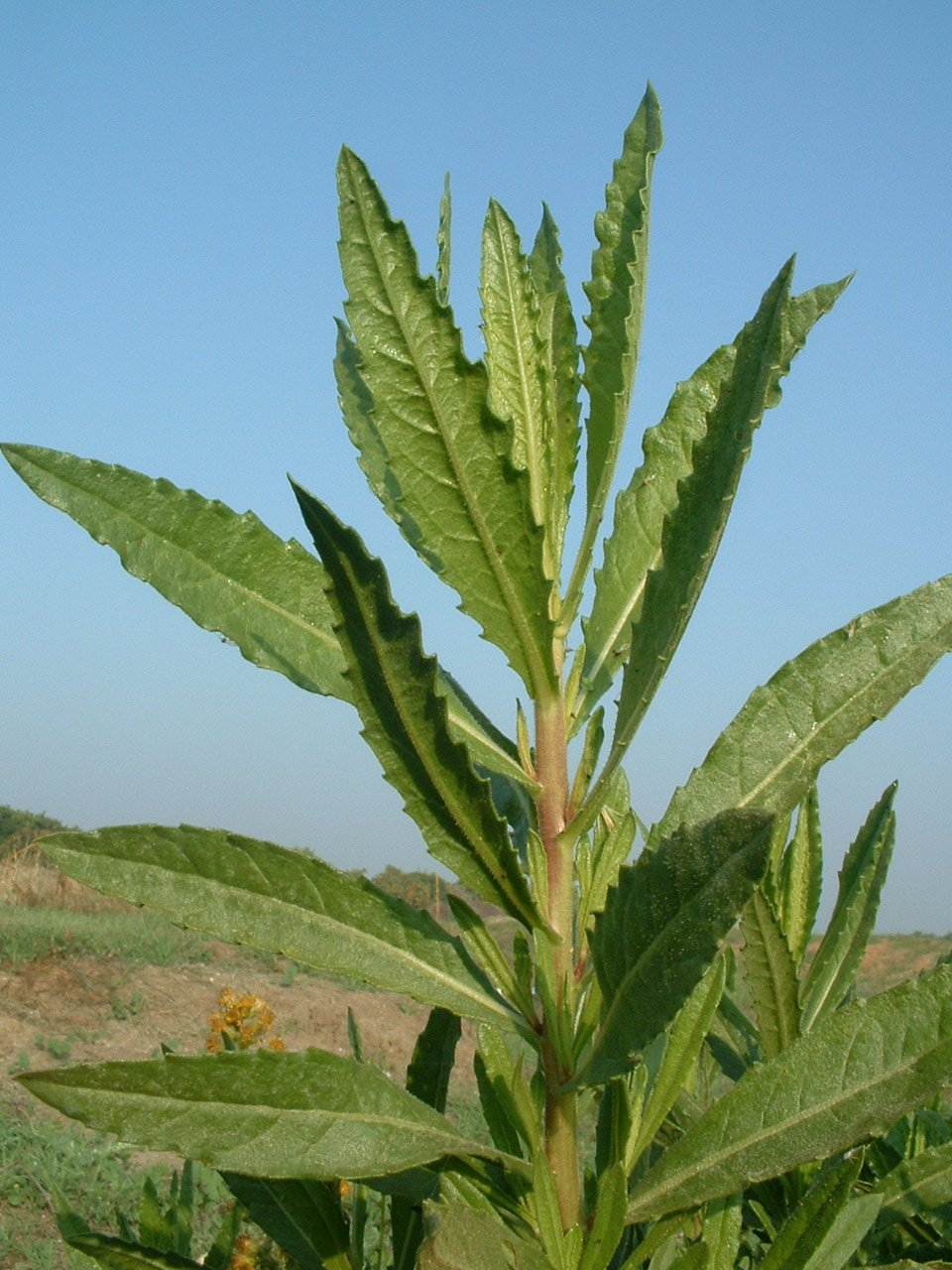
Leaves

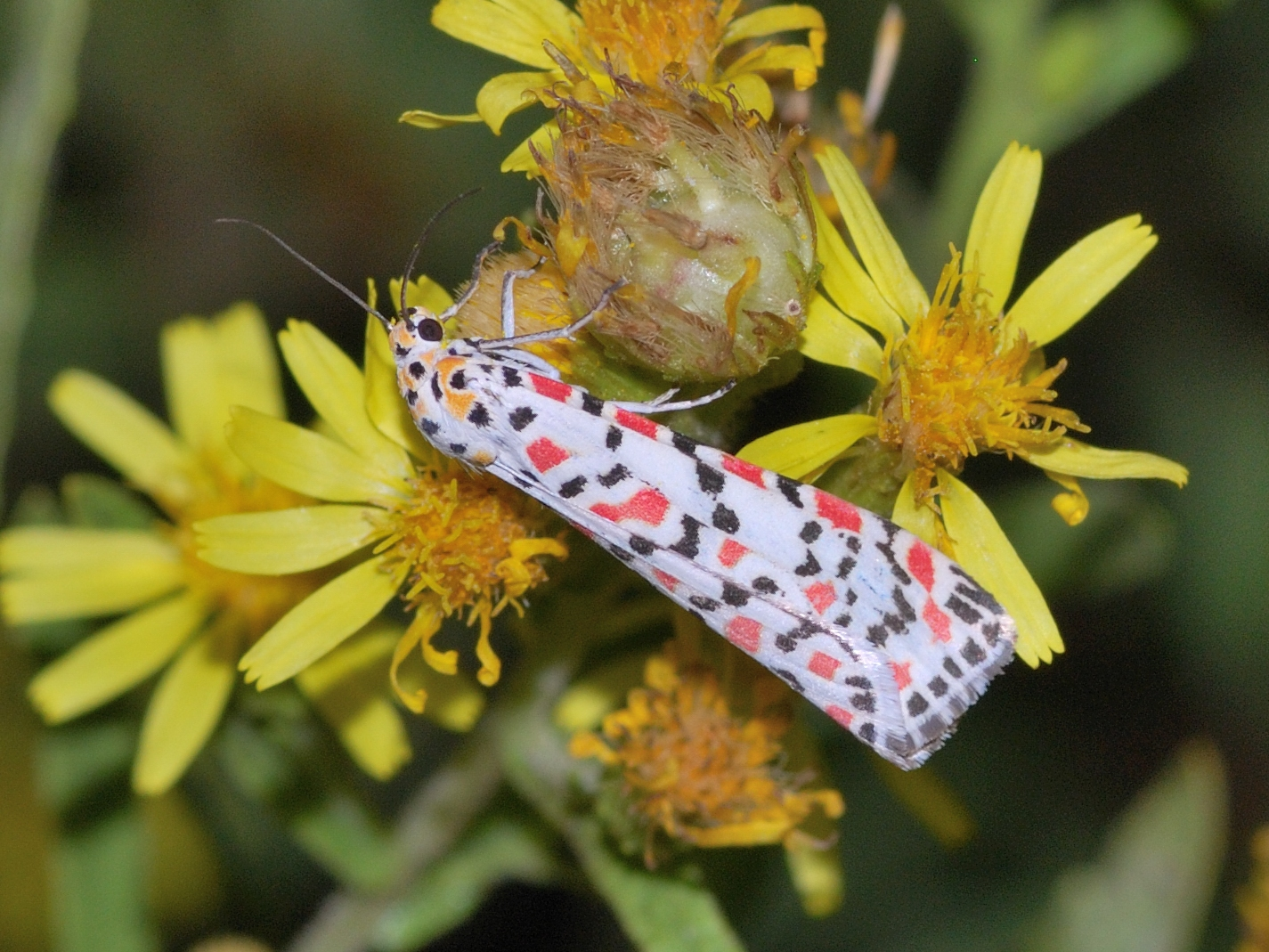
Utetheisa pulchella on Dittrichia viscosa

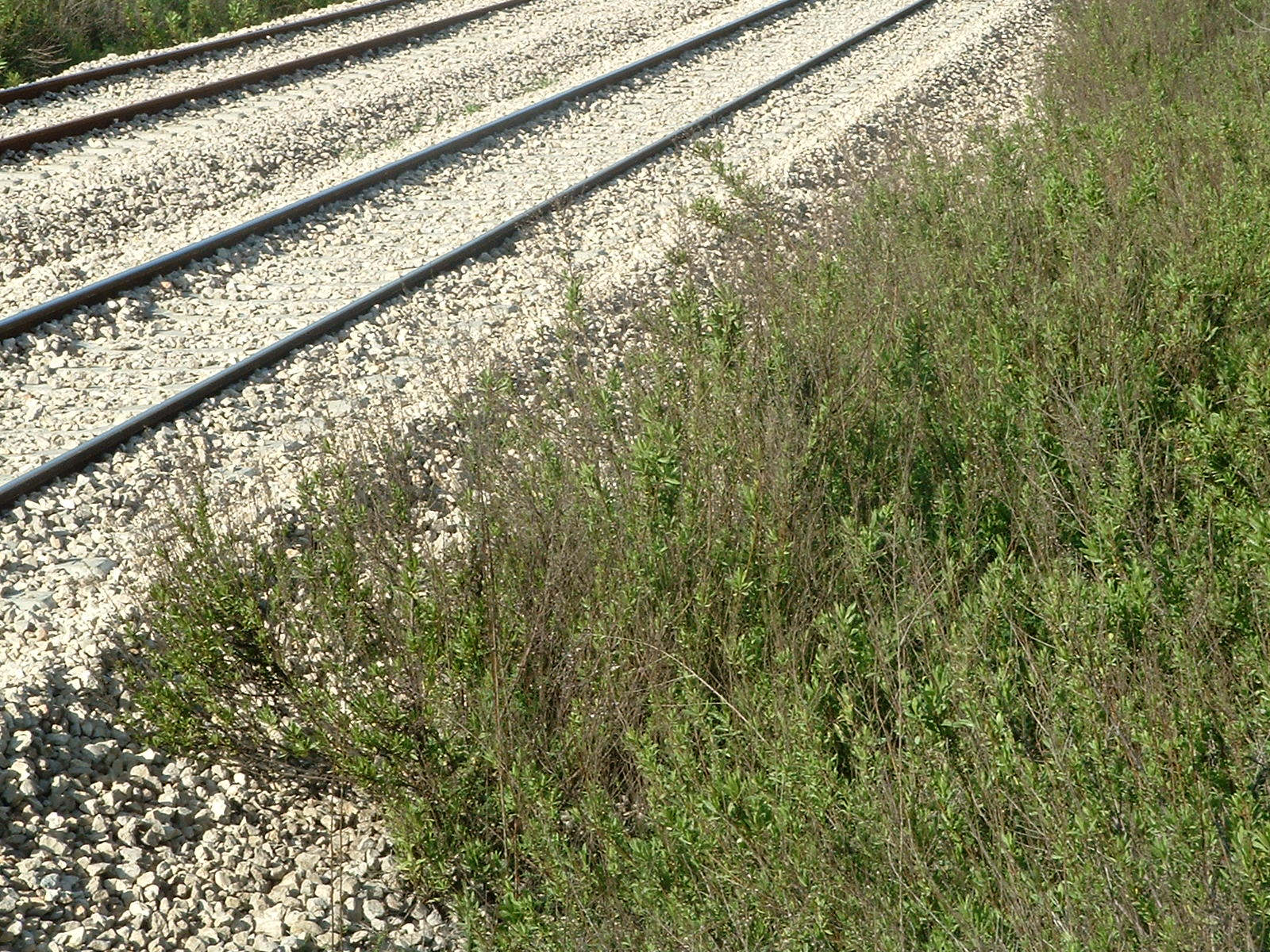
Ruderal community of Dittrichia viscosa growing on the railway-side gravel next to Petah Tikva-Sgula railway station, Israel.

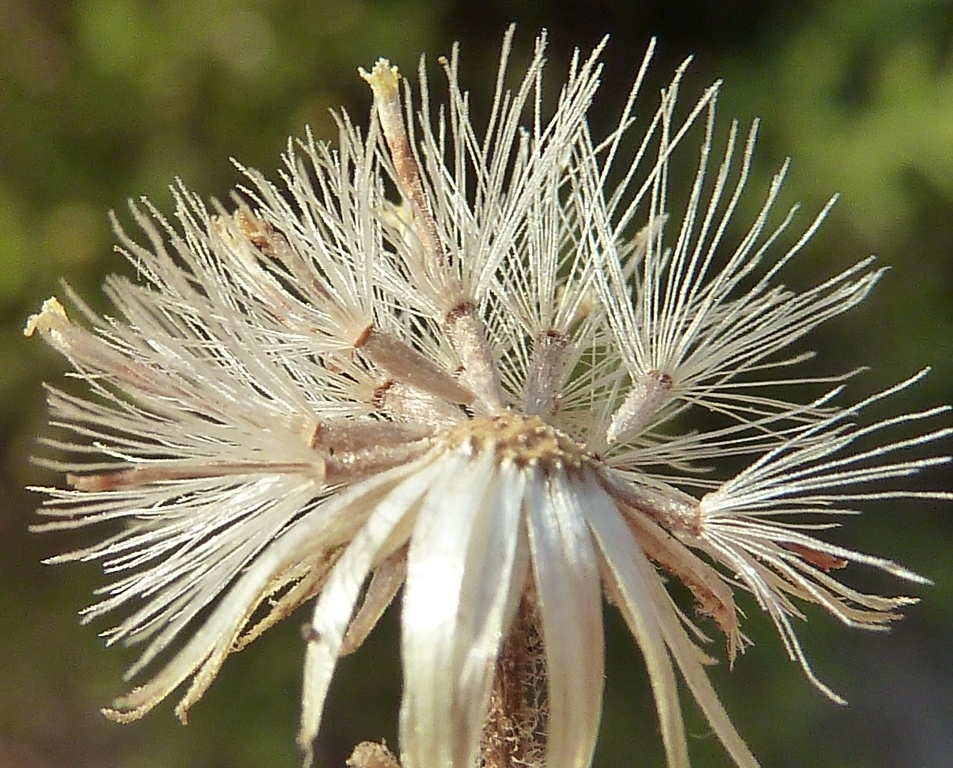
Cypselae in situ

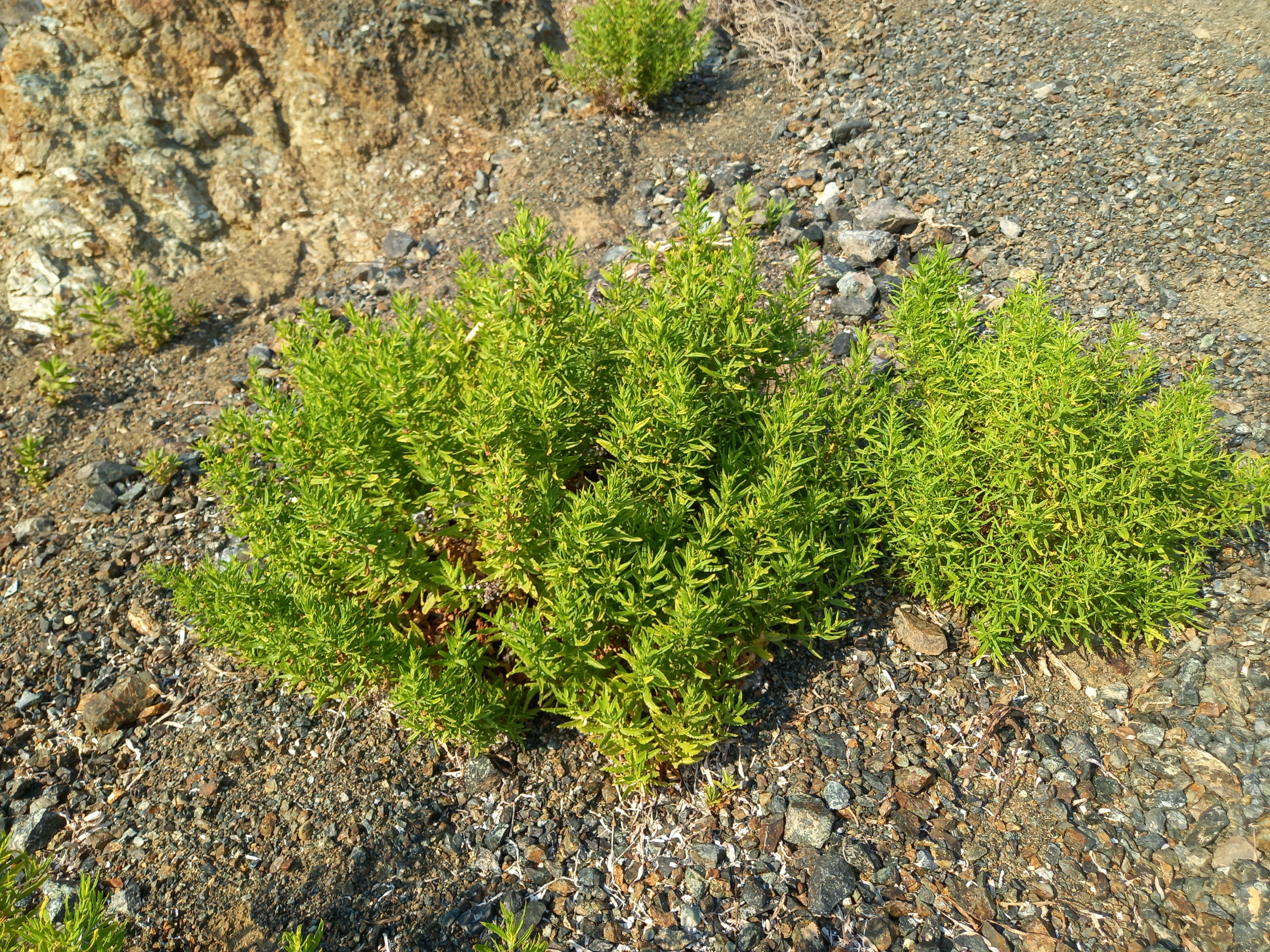
Dittrichia viscosa growing in Giardino beach in Elba Island
