= Bove =

Bove is a surname. Notable people with the surname include:

- Angelica Bove (born 2003), Italian singer-songwriter
- Carol Bove (born 1971), American artist
- Davide Bove (born 1998), Italian footballer
- Edoardo Bove (born 2002), Italian footballer
- Emil Bove (born 1981), American attorney, principal associate deputy attorney general in the second Trump administration
- Edward Bove, American surgeon
- Linda Bove (born 1945), deaf American actress
- Martin Bove, American politician
- Raphael Bove (born 1977), Italian Australian footballer
- Zach Bove (born 1989), American baseball coach

== See also ==
- Bové, a surname (including a list of people with the name)
- Bove (disambiguation)
