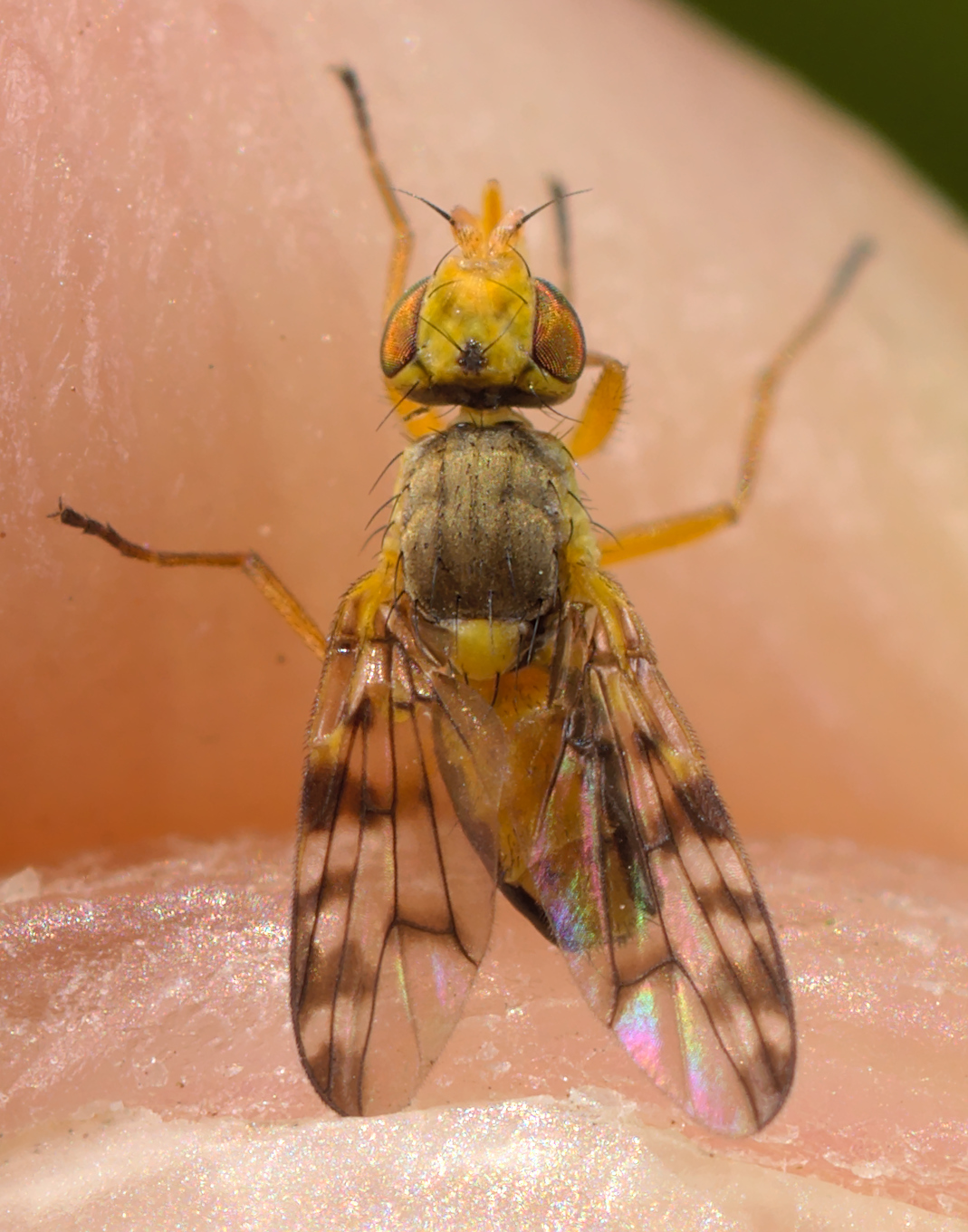

Scientific classification
- Kingdom: Animalia
- Phylum: Arthropoda
- Class: Insecta
- Order: Diptera
- Family: Tephritidae
- Subfamily: Tephritinae
- Tribe: Myopitini
- Genus: Myopites
- Species: M. apicatus

Binomial name
- Myopites apicatus Freidberg, 1980

Synonyms
- Myopites apicata Freidberg, 1980

= Myopites apicatus =

Species of fly

Myopites apicatus is a species of tephritid or fruit flies in the family Tephritidae.

== Distribution ==
France, Austria, Slovakia, Hungary, Italy, Greece (Crete), Turkey, Israel.
