= Myopites delottoi =

Scientific classification
- Kingdom: Animalia
- Phylum: Arthropoda
- Class: Insecta
- Order: Diptera
- Family: Tephritidae
- Subfamily: Tephritinae
- Tribe: Myopitini
- Genus: Myopites
- Species: M. delottoi

Binomial name
- Myopites delottoi Munro, 1955

Species of fly

Myopites delottoi is a species of tephritid or fruit flies in the genus Myopites of the family Tephritidae.

== Distribution ==
Eritrea.
