= Monte Vermenone =

Mountain in Italy

- Location within Italy

Highest point
- Elevation: 1,364 m (4,475 ft)
- Prominence: 216 m (709 ft)
- Coordinates: 43°07′49″N 12°55′21″E

Geography
- Location: Marche, Italy
- Parent range: Apennines

Monte Vermenone is a mountain of Marche, Italy.
