= Christian Nestell Bovee =

American writer (1820–1904)

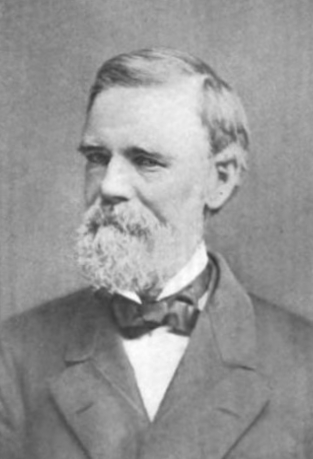
- Born: February 22, 1820; New York, New York
- Died: January 18, 1904 (aged 83); Philadelphia, Pennsylvania
- Occupation: Writer

Christian Nestell Bovee (February 22, 1820 – January 18, 1904) was an epigrammatic New York City writer.

== Biography ==
Christian Nestell Bovee was born in New York on February 22, 1820.

Bovee wrote two books that were widely quoted in contemporaneous compilations, these being Intuitions and Summaries of Thought and Thoughts, Feelings and Fancies.

It was reported that Bovee "enjoyed the intimate friendship of Washington Irving, Longfellow, Emerson, Oliver Wendell Holmes and of all the brilliant men who composed at that time the Saturday Evening Club of Boston". He died in Philadelphia on January 18, 1904.
