= Bovee, South Dakota =

Unincorporated community in South Dakota, U.S.

Coordinates: 43°19′24″N 98°46′08″W

Bovee is an unincorporated community in Charles Mix County, in the U.S. state of South Dakota.

== History ==
A community here was settled around 1913. It was built to serve as a trading hub along a branch line of the Milwaukee Road for farmers in Rhoda Township. The town faded away in the 1920s after Highway 45, later signed Highway 43, and present day SD 50, bypassed the town to bring farmers to market in Geddes and Platte.

A post office called Bovee was established in 1916, and remained in operation until 1955. The community has the name of Myndert Bovee, a pioneer settler.

As of 2023, the only remnants left of the town are some of the street grid, some foundations, and a house collapsed in on itself on 371st Ave.
