= Croce di Monte Bove =

Mountain in Italy

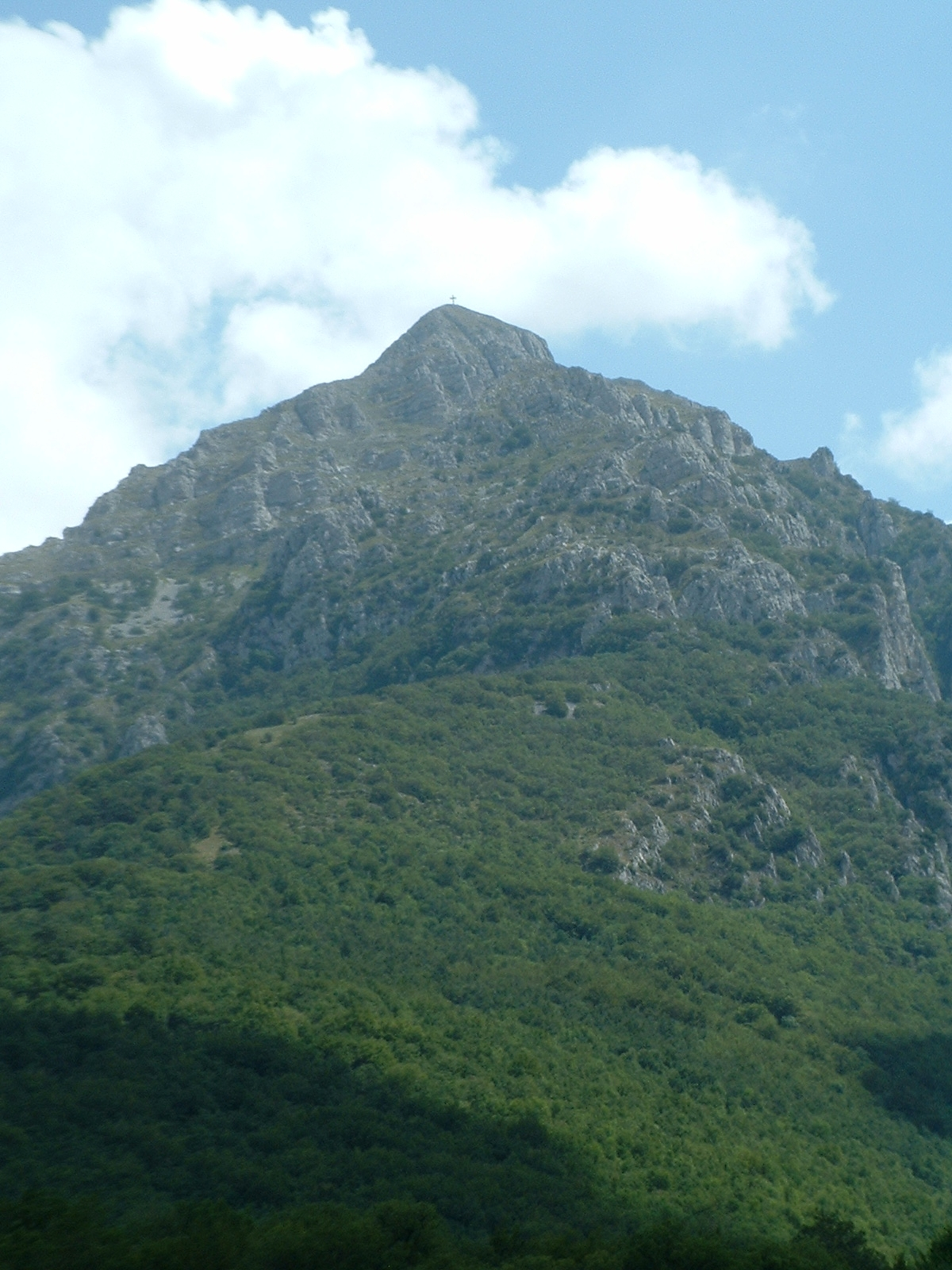

Highest point
- Elevation: 1,905 m (6,250 ft)
- Coordinates: 42°56′03″N 13°10′40″E

Geography
- Location within Italy
- Location: Marche, Italy

Croce di Monte Bove is a mountain of Marche, Italy. It has an elevation of 1,905 metres above sea level. It is popular for mountain hiking.
