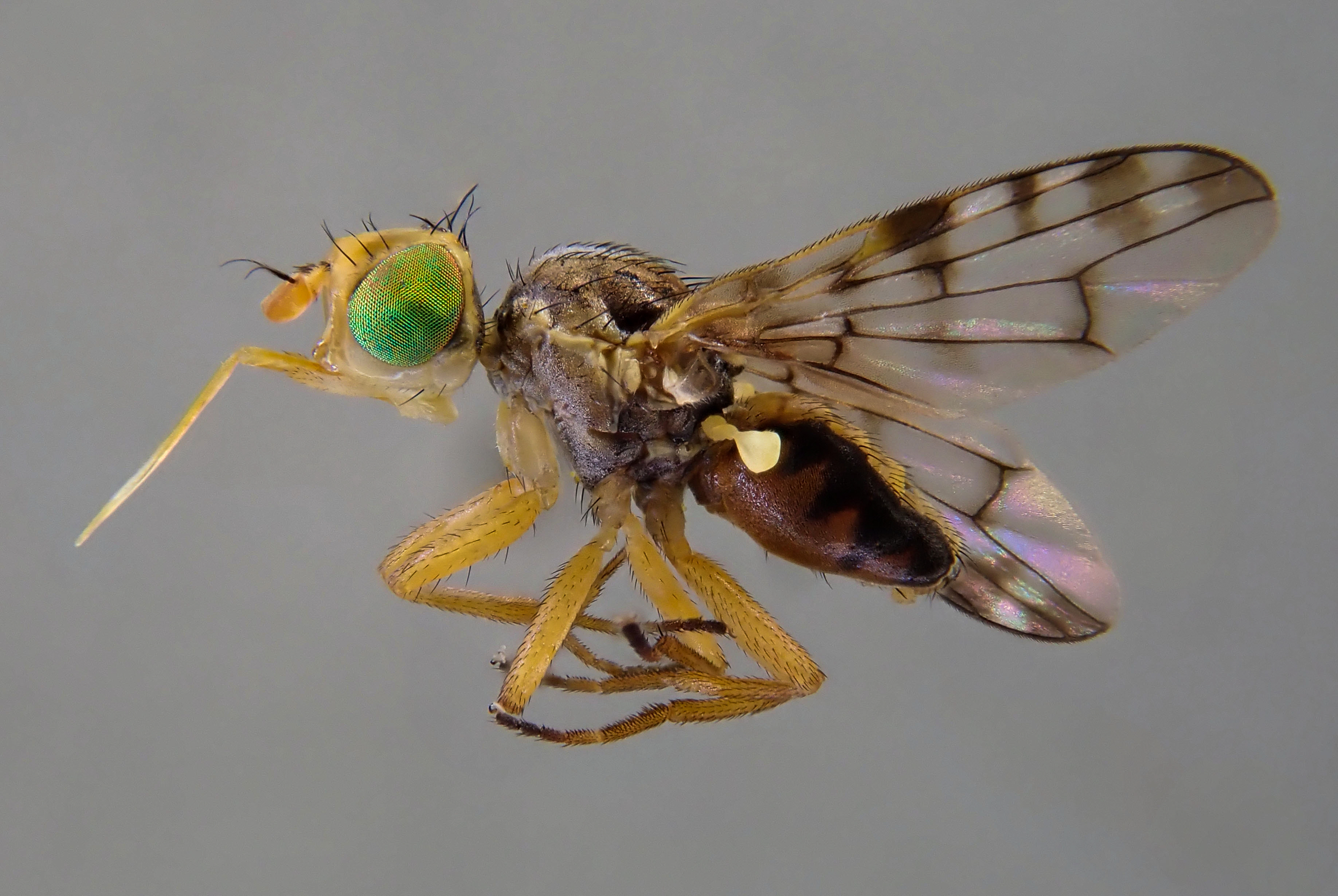

Scientific classification
- Kingdom: Animalia
- Phylum: Arthropoda
- Clade: Pancrustacea
- Class: Insecta
- Order: Diptera
- Family: Tephritidae
- Subfamily: Tephritinae
- Tribe: Myopitini
- Genus: Myopites
- Species: M. inulaedyssentericae

Binomial name
- Myopites inulaedyssentericae Blot, 1827

Synonyms
- Myiopites olivierii Bezzi, 1908; Myopites blotii Brébisson, 1827; Myopites bottii Costa, 1882; Myopites olivieri Kieffer, 1899; Myopites sardoa Costa, 1882; Rhyncheterus damascenus Rondani, 1863; Tephritis hebe Newman, 1833; Tephritis jasoniae Dufour, 1862; Tephritis septemmaculata Macquart, 1835

= Myopites inulaedyssentericae =

Species of fly

Myopites inulaedyssentericae is a species of tephritid or fruit flies in the genus Myopites of the family Tephritidae.

== Distribution ==
United Kingdom, France, Germany, Estonia, Central Europe, Spain, Italy, Balkans, Ukraine, North Africa.
