= Monte Argentella =

Mountain in Italy

- Location within Italy

Highest point
- Elevation: 2,201 m (7,221 ft)
- Prominence: 201 m (659 ft)
- Coordinates: 42°51′31″N 13°15′21″E

Geography
- Location: Marche, Italy
- Parent range: Apennines

Monte Argentella is a mountain of Marche, Italy. It has an elevation of 2,201 metres above sea level.

Located in the Monti Sibillini National Park, Monte Argentella has a wide variety of flora.
