= Martin Bove =

American politician

Member of New Hampshire House of Representatives for Rockingham 5
- In office 2016 – December 4, 2018

Personal details
- Party: Republican
- Education: Nathaniel Hawthorne College
- Alma mater: Rivier University

Martin N. Bove is an American politician. He was a member of the New Hampshire House of Representatives and represented Rockingham 5th district from 2016 to 2018.
