= Monte Bove Sud =

Mountain in Italy

- Location within Italy

Highest point
- Elevation: 2,169 m (7,116 ft)
- Coordinates: 42°54′51″N 13°11′56″E

Geography
- Location: Marche, Italy

Monte Bove Sud is a mountain of Marche, Italy. It has an elevation of 2,169 metres above sea level. It is popular for mountain hiking.
