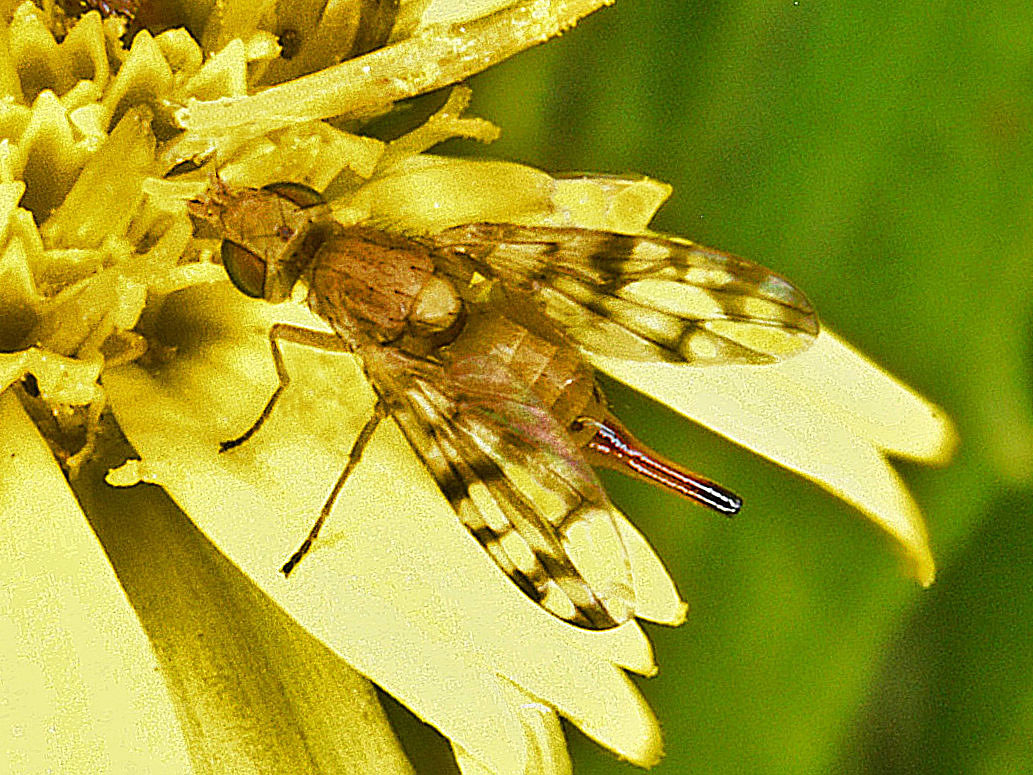
- Myopites stylatus

Scientific classification
- Kingdom: Animalia
- Phylum: Arthropoda
- Class: Insecta
- Order: Diptera
- Family: Tephritidae
- Subfamily: Tephritinae
- Tribe: Myopitini
- Genus: Myopites; Blot, 1827

Type species
- Myopites inulaedyssentericae Blot, 1827

Synonyms
- Rhyncheterus Rondani, 1863; Rhynchetenus Foote, 1984; Myiopites Bezzi, 1908

= Myopites =

Genus of flies

Myopites is a genus of tephritid or fruit flies in the family Tephritidae.

== Species ==
Species within this genus include:

- Myopites apicatus Freidberg, 1980
- Myopites boghariensis Séguy, 1934
- Myopites bonifaciae Dirlbek, 1973
- Myopites cypriacus Hering, 1938
- Myopites delottoi (Munro, 1955)
- Myopites eximia Séguy, 1932
- Myopites hemixanthus (Munro, 1931)
- Myopites inulaedyssentericae Blot, 1827
- Myopites lelea Dirlbek, 1973
- Myopites longirostris (Loew, 1846)
- Myopites nigrescens Becker, 1908
- Myopites olii Dirlbek, 1973
- Myopites orientalis Korneyev, 1987
- Myopites stylatus (Fabricius, 1794)
- Myopites tenellus Frauenfeld, 1863
- Myopites variofasciatus Becker, 1903
- Myopites zernyi Hering, 1939
