= Leonardi (surname) =

Leonardi is an Italian surname from the forename Leonardo. Notable people with the surname include.

- Achille Leonardi (c.1800–1870), Italian artist
- Alessandro Leonardi or Lionardi, Italian Renaissance poet
- Alvaro Leonardi (1895–1955), Italian World War I Sottotenente
- Andrea Leonardi, better known as Bratt Sinclaire, Italian musician
- Anna Isabella Leonardi (1620–1804), prolific Italian composer
- Camillo Leonardi (1451–1550), Italian astronomer and astrologer
- Cesare Leonardi (1935–2021), Italian architect
- Elvira Bouyeure (née Leonardi) (1906–1999), Italian fashion designer and couturier
- Elvira Rodríguez Leonardi, Argentine politician
- Ezio Leonardi (1929–2025), Italian politician
- Francesco Leonardi, Italian food author and chef of Empress Catherine II of Russia
- Francesco Leonardi (missionary) (died 1646), Papal missionary who served as the Archbishop of Antivari
- Giovanni Leonardi (1541–1609), Roman Catholic saint
- Giuseppe Leonardi (born 1996), Italian sprinter
- Gustavo Leonardi (1869–1918), Italian entomologist
- Juan María Leonardi Villasmil (1947–2014), Italian titular bishop of Lesvi and auxiliary of the Archdiocese of Mérida, Venezuela
- Lamberto Leonardi (1939–2021), Italian professional football coach
- Leoncillo Leonardi (1915–1968), Italian sculptor
- Luca Leonardi (born 1991), Italian freestyle swimmer
- Marco Leonardi (born 1971), Italian actor
- Marina Leonardi (born 1970), Italian pianist and composer
- Matilde Leonardi, Italian neurologist and paediatrician
- Mauro Leonardi (born 1959), Italian priest, writer and commentator
- Michelangelo Leonardi, Italian racing driver
- Natascia Cortesi (née Leonardi) (born 1971), Swiss cross-country skier
- Oliviero Leonardi (1921–2019), Italian painter and sculptor
- Paul Leonardi, American professor of Technology Management
- Pietro Leonardi (born 1963), Italian businessman, sporting and managing director of Italian association football
- Priamo Leonardi (1888–1984), Italian admiral during World War II
- Rick Leonardi, American comic book illustrator
- Salvator Léonardi (1872–1938), Italian mandolin virtuoso, teacher and composer
- Sergio Leonardi (born 1944), Italian singer and actor
- Silvio Leonardi (1914–1990), Italian politician
- Thomas Leonardi (born 1954), American insurance executive and former Connecticut Insurance Commissioner
- Tomás Leonardi (born 1987), Argentine rugby union footballer
- Vincenzo Leonardi (ca. 1590 – ca. 1646 Rome), Italian illustrator of natural history
- Vittorio Leonardi (born 1977), Italian stand-up comedian and actor
