= Niccolò Frangipane =

Italian painter

The Holy Family with the Infant St John, 1585

Niccolò Frangipane (active 1565–1597) was an Italian artist of the late Renaissance period.

== Life ==
Frangipane was born in Padua. He executed a number of sacred subjects, but was more successful in mythological scenes, particularly the legends of Bacchus. In the church of San Bartolomeo in Padua is a depiction of St Francis of Assisi (1588); and at Pesaro, an altar-piece in San Stefano in Pesaro. Among his masterworks is an Assumption, in the church of the Conventuali, at Rimini.

== Works ==
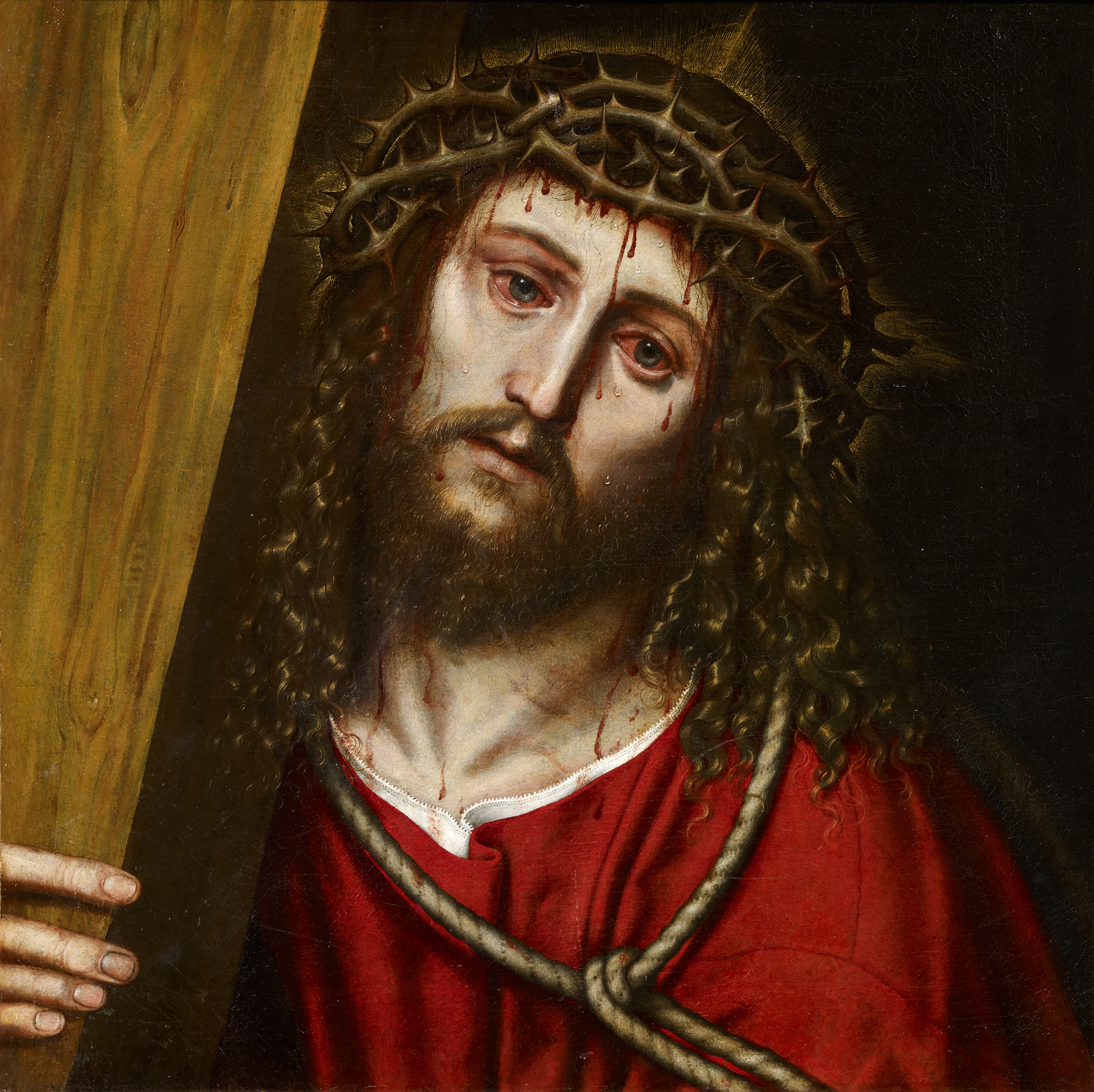
Penitent, 1574, Carmen Thyssen Museum in Málaga

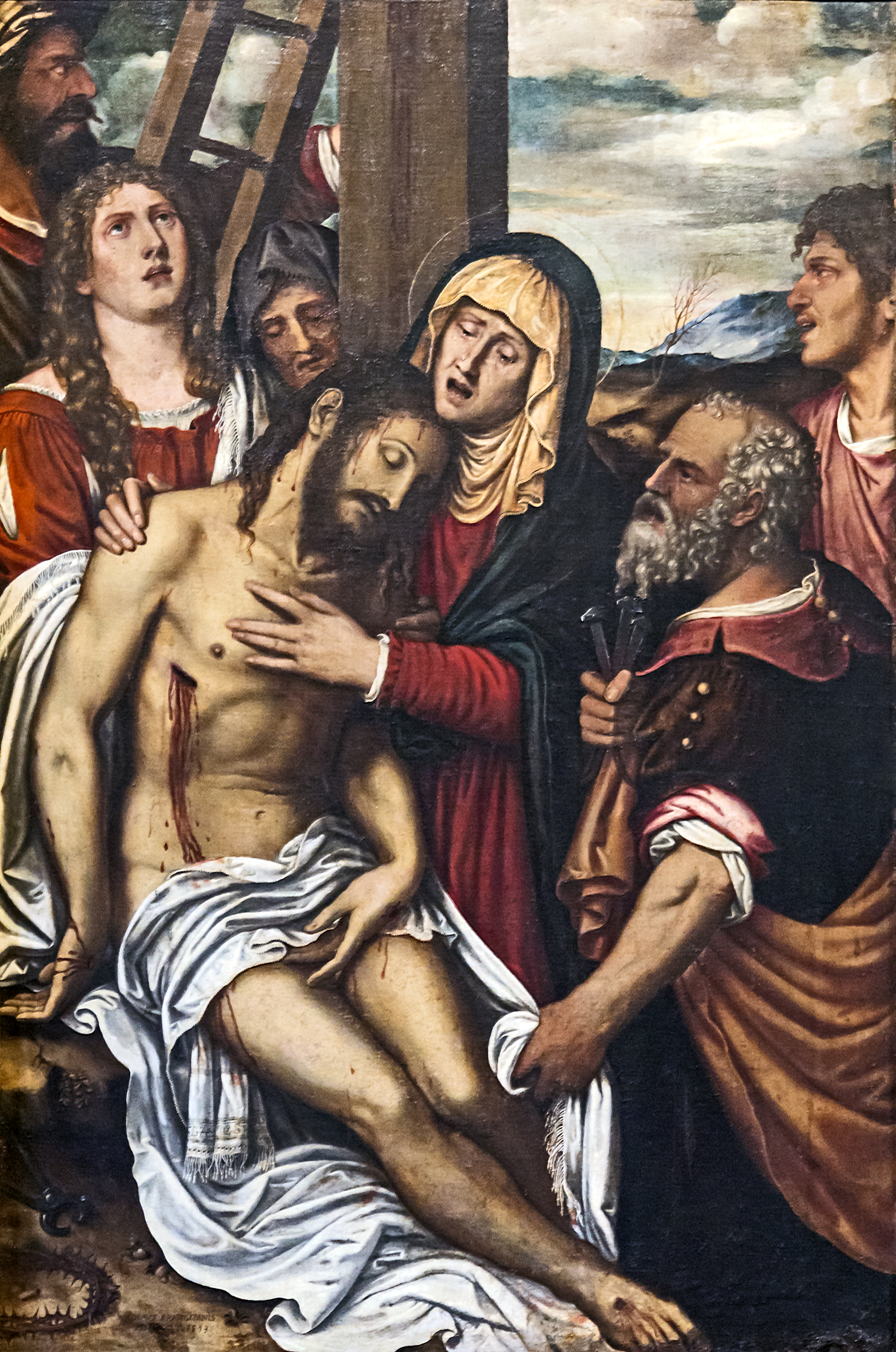
Descent from the Cross, 1593, Santa Maria Gloriosa dei Frari, Venice

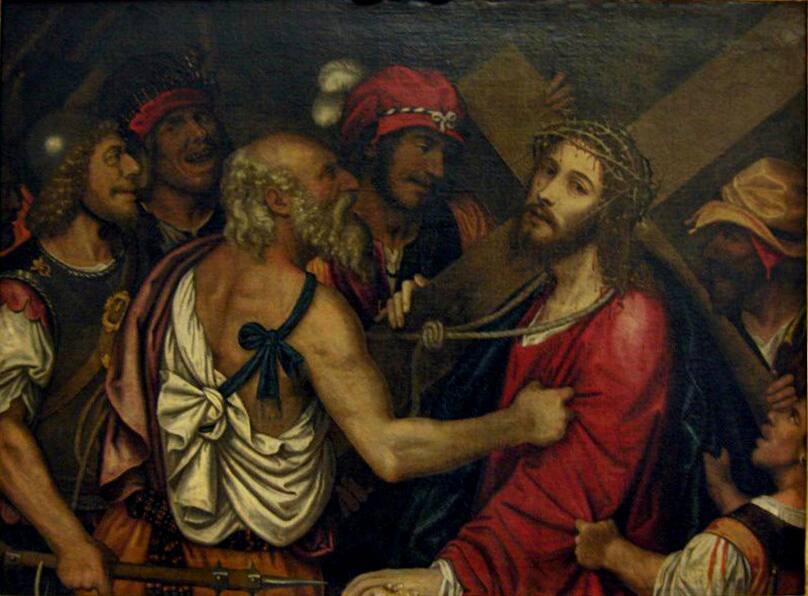
The way to the Calvary, City Museum of Rimini
