= Leonardis =

Leonardis is a surname. Notable people with the surname include:

- Giacomo Leonardis (1723 - 1797) Italian engraver and etcher
- Roberto de Leonardis (1913 - 1984), Italian film script translator, film dialogue writer and film lyricist
- Aleš Leonardis, Slovenian professor of computer and information science
- Savo Leonardis (1931 - 2016), Slovenian professor of electronics

== See also ==
- Leonardi
