= Giovanni Antonio Pandolfi =

Giovanni Antonio Pandolfi may refer to:

- Giovanni Antonio Pandolfi (painter) (1541–1581), Mannerist painter from Pesaro
- Giovanni Antonio Pandolfi (musician) (1624–c. 1687), composer from Montepulciano
