= Santissima Annunziata, Pesaro =

Church building in Pesaro, Italy

Coordinates: 43°54′41.3″N 12°54′45.3″E

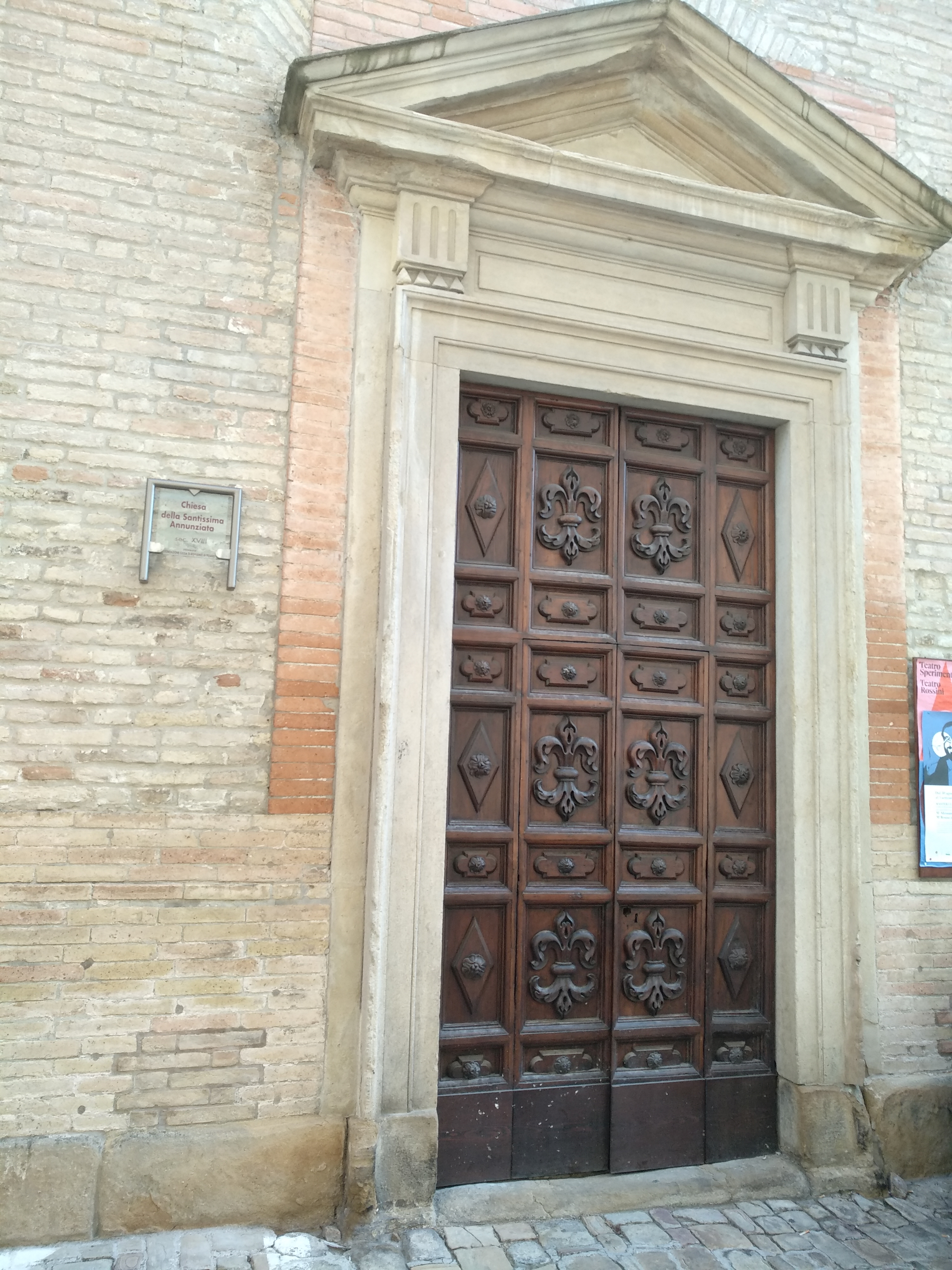
Pesaro – Church of the Most Holy Annunciation

The Church of the Santissima Annunziata is a small Baroque church or oratory located on via dell'Annunziata in central Pesaro, region of Marche, Italy. The deconsecrated church was restored in the year 2000, and the building in 2016 was used for cultural exhibitions and events.

== History ==
The structure was originally built by a confraternity, Confraternita dell’Annunziata, which had been founded in 1347 by the Beato Cecco and Beata Michelina Metelli to provide for hospice and proper burial to the poor, including pilgrims in transit through Pesaro. The lot was donated to the confraternity in 1356. The building underwent refurbishment to its present layout in the mid 17th century.

In 1779, it was acquired by the Mosca family, whose palace was adjacent. The Mosca family, which used the church as a mausoleum of the family, commissioned the paintings in the cupola and the installation of the stucco saint statues in the niches. With the extinction of the Mosca family in 1938, the church was ceded to the Pesaro Cathedral.

In 1714–1715, the apse acquired a dramatic stucco Annunciation relief by the late-Baroque artist Giuseppe Mazza; this replaced the prior main altarpiece: an early-16th-century painting by Marco Palmezzano, now found in the Pinacoteca Vaticana. Once this church also housed the Madonna del Popolo with the Beata Michelina, St Luke, and an Angel (now in the Museum of the Cathedral) by Giovanni Giacomo Pandolfi. In 1921, it was substituted by the Madonna del Rosario and Saints by Fernando Mariotti (1891-1969). This painting and the Jesus on Cross with two Saints by Giovanni Peruzzini are now also in the Cathedral. The church contains a number of burial tombs.

The facade once had a revered fresco image of the Madonna del Popolo, but this was removed to protect it from the elements.
