= Madonna Del Porto, Pesaro =

Church building in Pesaro, Italy

Coordinates: 43.91418°N 12.90776°E

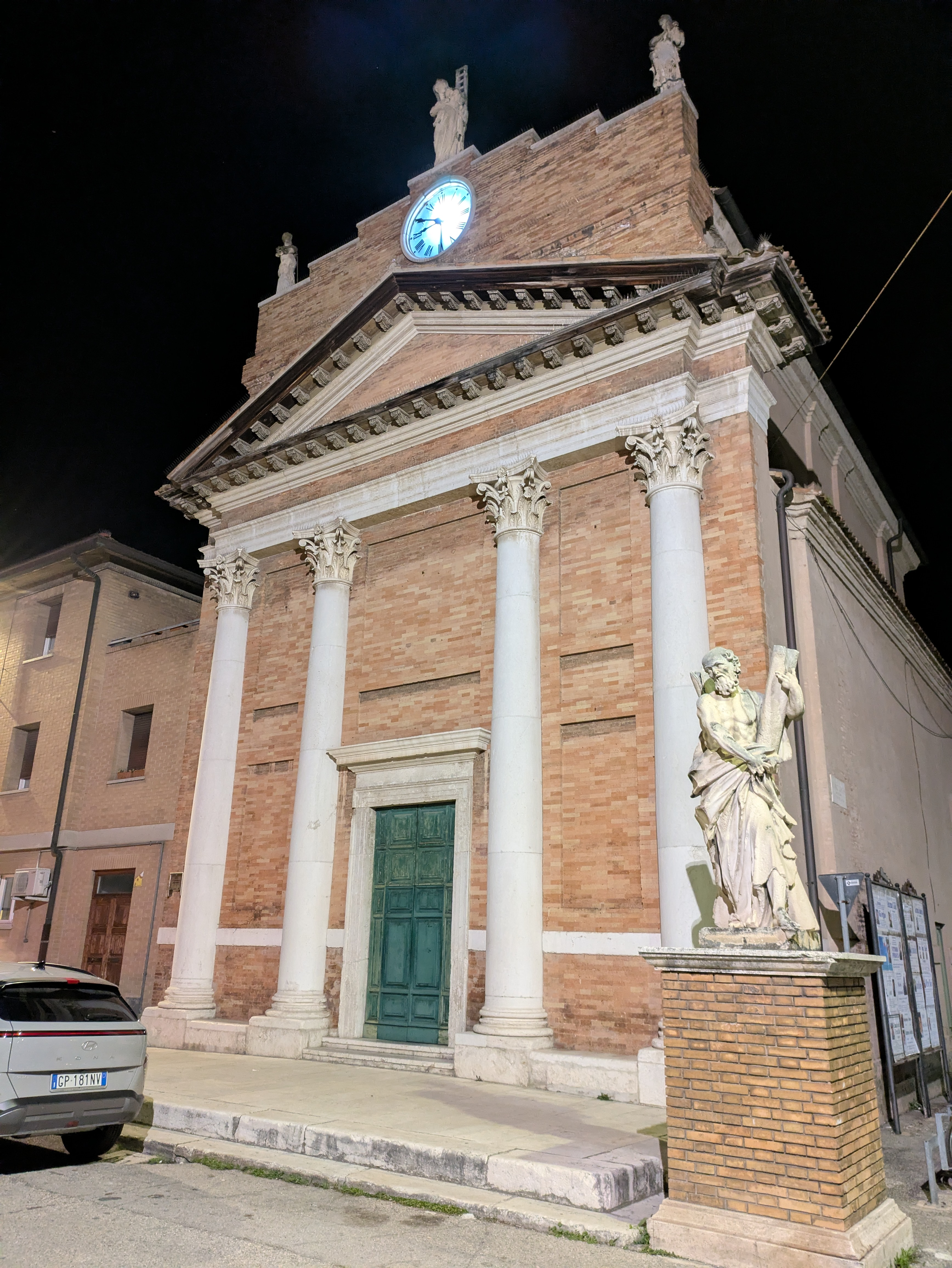

The Madonna Del Porto, also known as the Madonna della Scala, is a Neoclassic-style, Roman Catholic church located in Pesaro, region of Marche, Italy.

The church was designed in 1822 by Pietro Togni.

It is located in a small piazza just outside the walls of the town, leading to the Port. In front there is a small fountain designed by Giovanni Francesco Buonamici of Rimini. The first altar once held a Sant'Ubaldo by Palma il Giovane, now a St Andrew, St Peter, and the fisherman with Christ by an unknown painter; and the second altar, a Visitation by Giovanni Giacomo Pandolfi. The facade has four columns with corinthian capitals, and in the upper portion, a statue of the Virgin and Child with a Scala Coeli and Angels.
