= Giovanni Antonio Pandolfi (painter) =

Italian painter

Giovanni Antonio Pandolfi (c. 1540 - c. 1581) was an Italian painter active in the Central Italy, including Foligno, Perugia, and his native Pesaro. He died in Perugia.

== Biography ==
He collaborated with the Mannerist painter Niccolò Circignani in the mythologic frescoes painted for the Palazzo della Corgna in Castiglione del Lago. He also painted canvas on the Martyrdom of St Lawrence (1572) and frescoes in the sacristy for the Cathedral of Perugia. He may have frescoed for the nearby Oratory of Nunziatella of Perugia. In Pesaro, he painted a Madonna delle Grazie with San Terenzio and the Blessed Michelina.

He was married to Lucrezia, sister of the painter Girolamo Danti. Giovanni Antonio is almost certainly the father of Giovanni Giacomo Pandolfi, born 1570 in Pesaro, and who was an initial master of Simone Cantarini.

His relationship with other Pandolfi artists is unclear. He should not be confused with Giovanni Antonio Pandolfi Mealli (Montepulciano, Tuscany, c. 1630 – Madrid, c. 1670) who was a Baroque music composer. A Domenico Pandolfi was born to a painter father, Antonio, in Verona, and trained with Alessandro Marchesini. Domenico is known to have painted a canvas for the church of Santa Toscana. He also painted a canvas of the Annunciation for the chapel of San Vitale, since lost. Also painted for churches in Legnano. He died October 2, 1704, and was buried in San Vitale.
