= Villino Ruggeri =

Coordinates: 43.9141°N 12.9179°E

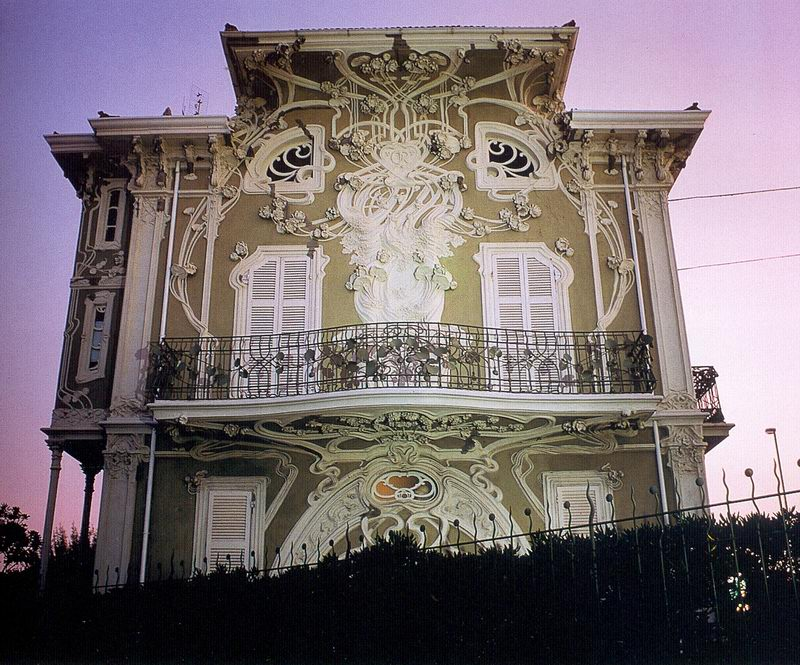
Giovanni Brega, villa Ruggeri (Pesaro), 1902

The Ruggeri House (Italian: Villino Ruggeri, literally "Ruggeri Cottage") is a Liberty style villa located in the town of Pesaro, the Marche, in Italy.

It was constructed between 1902 and 1907 for the pharmaceutical industrialist Oreste Ruggeri (1857–1912) and his family as a retreat. The architect was Giuseppe Brega (1877–1960).

The house is three storeys high. The front facade with the balcony has very ornate floral art nouveau stucco decorations with the monogram of the owner. The paint is in light green and white.
