= Church of the Maternità, Pesaro =

Church building in Pesaro, Italy

The Chiesa della Maternità or Church of the Maternity, is a Roman Catholic parish church located on via San Francesco in Pesaro, region of Marche, Italy.

A church at the site existed since 1216, but the present structure dates to a reconstruction in 1732 by the architect Giovanni Battista Togni with some help from Antonio Rinaldi and Luigi Vanvitelli, though retaining a centralized layout. The portal is made of rough stone bricks (bugnato), and above the portal is the coat of arms of the Della Rovere family. Also above the portal a bas-relief of the Santissimo Sacramento. High above on the facade is a clock. The church has an 18th-century bell-tower. The interior has three 18th-century frescoed panels by the studio of Giovanni Andrea Lazzarini, including altarpieces depicting the Magdalen and Maries at the Tomb; Rest during Flight to Egypt, and St Benedict with Saints Mauro and Placido.
