= Camillo Leonardi =

Italian astronomer and astrologer

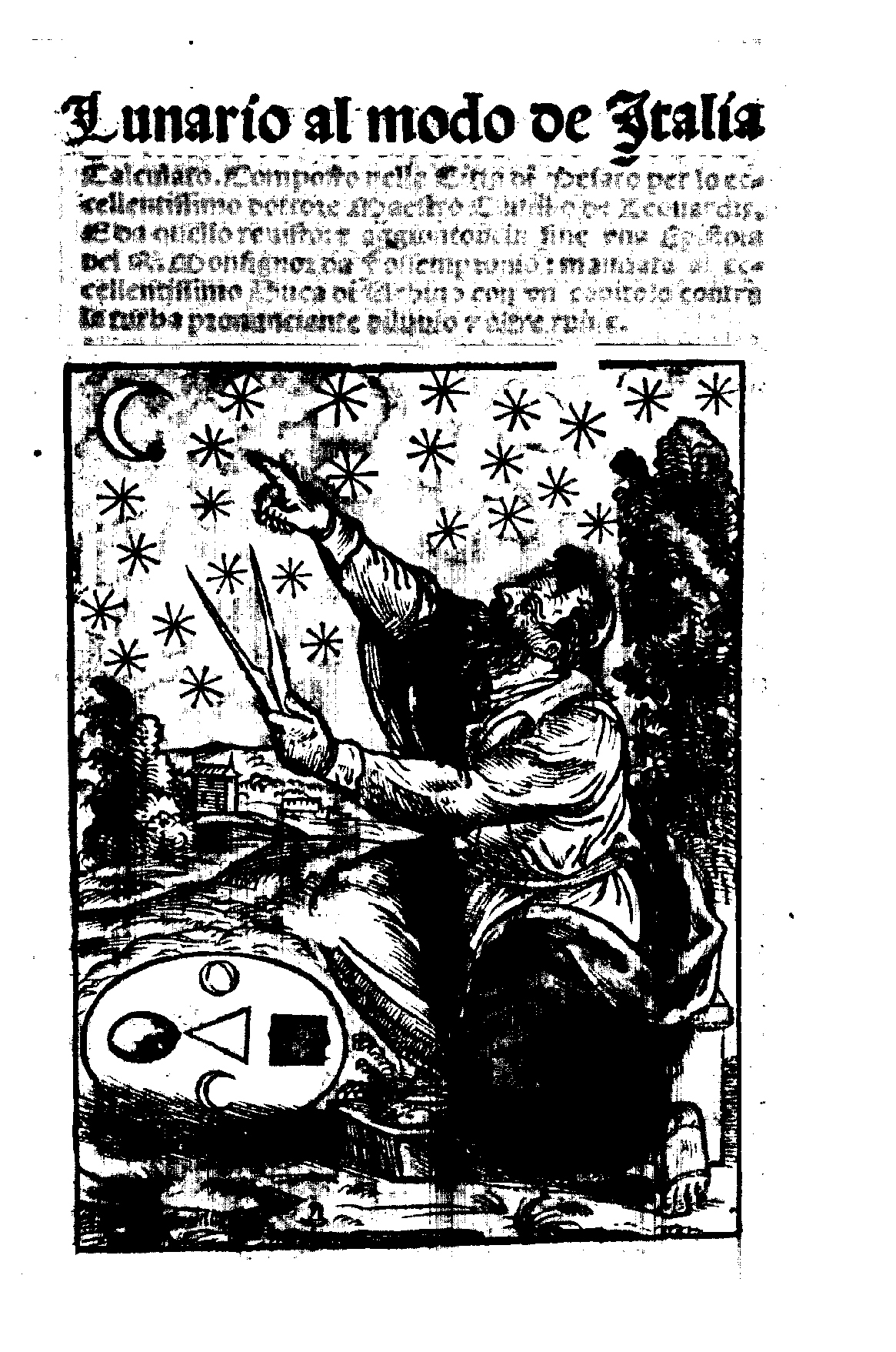
Frontispiece to Leonardi's Lunario

Camillo Leonardi was a 16th-century Italian astronomer and astrologer from Pesaro.

He was a courtier of Costanzo I Sforza and then of his son Giovanni Sforza. He had a doctorate in medicine at the University of Padua.

== Works ==
- Speculum lapidum (in Latin). Hamburg: Christian Liebezeit. 1717 [1502].
- Lunario al modo de Italia calculato (in Italian). Venice: Niccolò Zoppino. 1525.
