= Oratory of the Nome di Dio, Pesaro =

Church building in Pesaro, Italy

Coordinates: 43°54′36″N 12°54′36″E

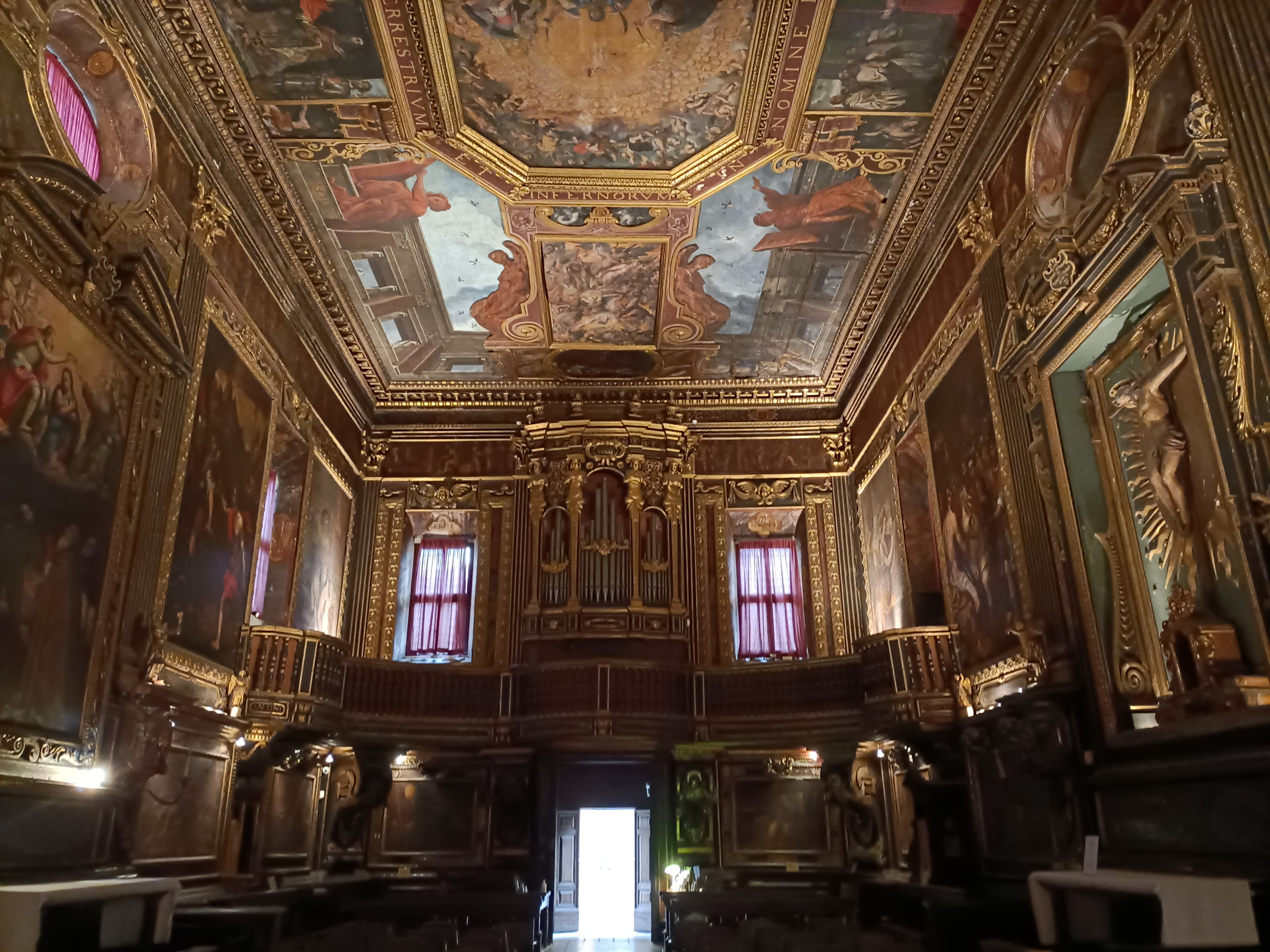
Inside view of the Oratory of the Nome di Dio

The Oratory of the Nome di Dio is a small 16th-century Roman Catholic prayer hall or oratory located on via Petrucci 23 in central Pesaro, region of Marche, Italy.

The oratory was commissioned in 1577 by the Confraternity of the Name of God, which granted burials to the poor. The external portal, in istrian marble, was designed by Giannandrea Lazzarini in 1763.

The highly decorated interiors remain generally intact. The frescoes on the walls and ceilings, depicting a Life of Faith, were completed by Giovanni Giacomo Pandolfi. The main altar once housed a Circumcision of Jesus by Federico Barocci. Near the organ was a portrait of Pandolfi.
