= Ducal Palace of Pesaro =

Coordinates: 43.9101°N 12.9121°E

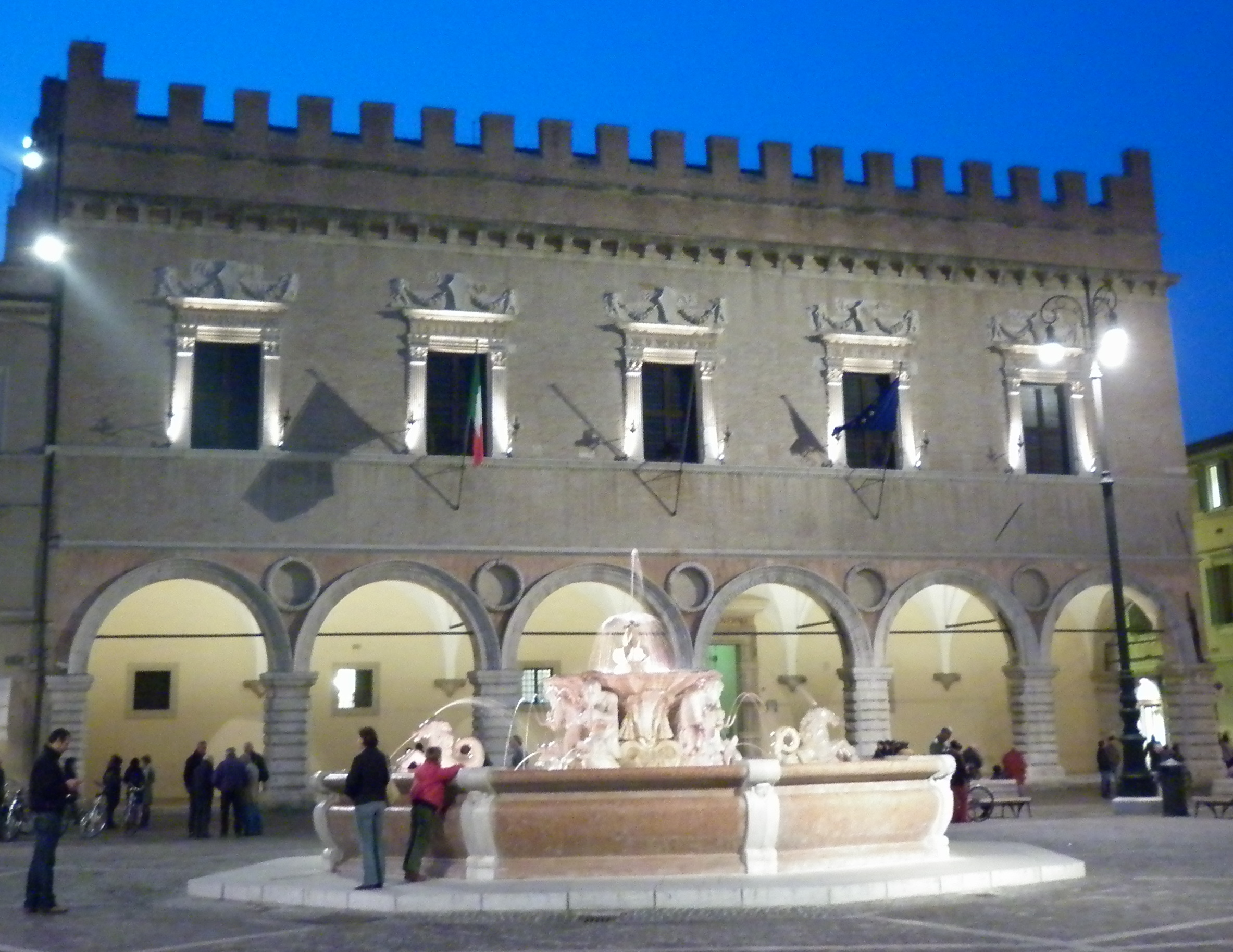
Ducal Palace of Pesaro

The Palazzo Ducale di Pesaro or Ducal Palace of Pesaro is a Renaissance-style palace in the city center of Pesaro, region of the Marche, Italy.

== History ==
The initial structure at the site upon which this palace was built was likely commissioned by the Malatesta, sometime between 1285 and 1429. The present palace was commissioned in the 15th century by Alessandro Sforza, and held by the Della Rovere family till 1631. Duke Francesco Maria I Della Rovere in 1523-1532, commissioned restorations from Girolamo Genga. Francesco Maria's son, Guidubaldo II continued renovation. Girolamo's son, Bartolomeo, added a wing, designed by Filippo Terzi along via Barignani. The interiors once had paintings by Federico Brandani, Taddeo Zuccari, and Ludovico Carracci.

With the passage in 1631 of the Duchy from the Della Rovere family to the Papal States, the palace housed the Papal legates. In the 19th century, refurbishment commissioned the decoration of five halls to Romolo Liverani. With the entry of the Papal States to the Kingdom of Italy, the palace next hosted the Prefecture. From 1920 to 1936, it housed the Civic Museum till this moved to the Palazzo Toschi Mosca.
