= Municipal Chapel of Sant'Ubaldo, Pesaro =

Church building in Pesaro, Italy

Coordinates: 43.91012°N 12.91366°E

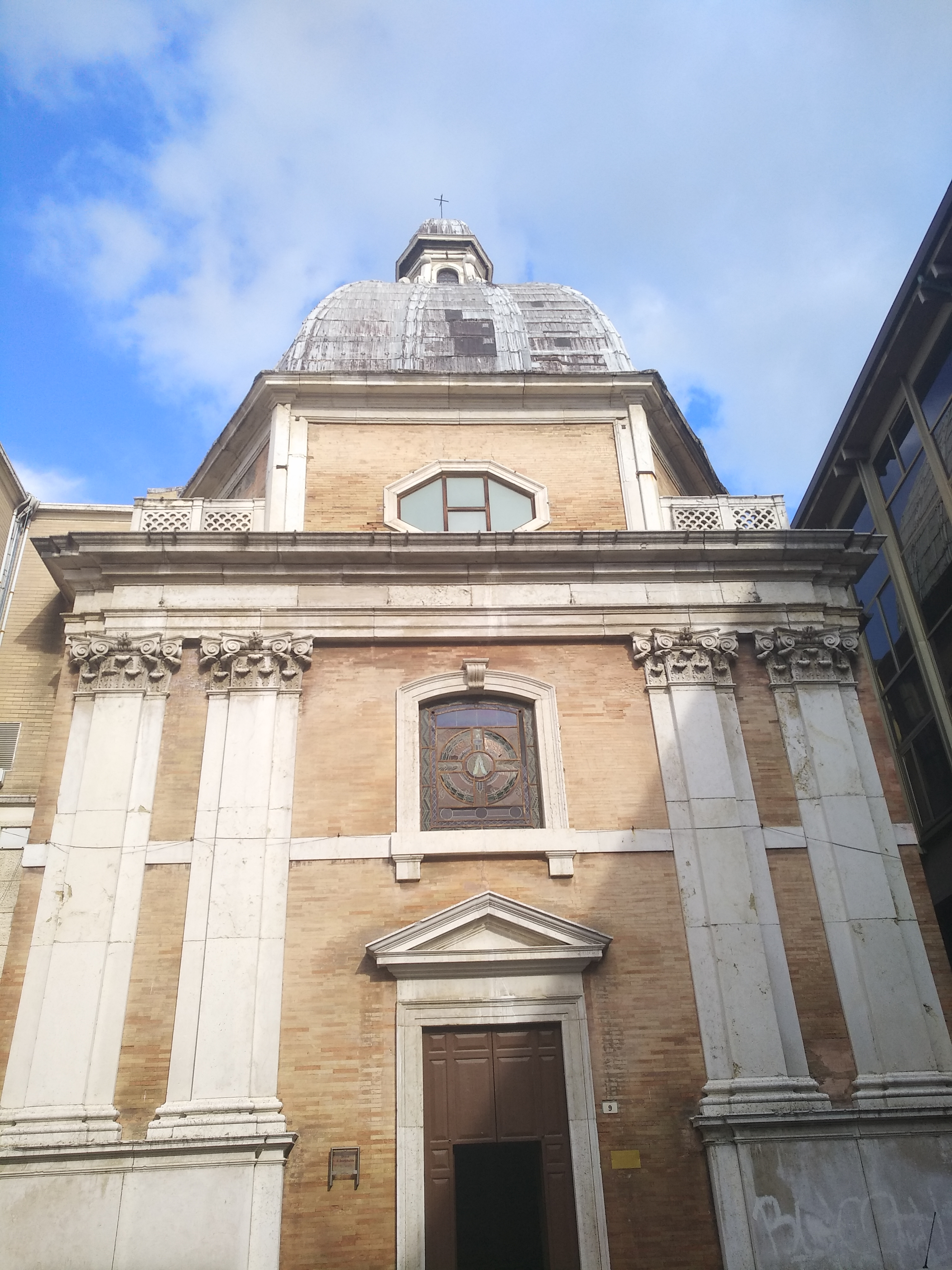
Pesaro - Municipal Chapel of Sant'Ubaldo

The Municipal Chapel of Sant'Ubaldo is a Baroque-style, small octagonal Roman Catholic church located on Largo Mamiani 1, in central Pesaro, region of Marche, Italy.

The chapel was commissioned by the City of Pesaro in 1605 during the Rule of the della Rovere family. It was built to satisfy a voto (or plea) by the Duke Francisco Maria II (born 1549) for an heir. On May 16, 1605, Francesco's second wife, Livia della Rovere, bore him the desired son, Federico Ubaldo. May 16 is the feast day of Sant'Ubaldo. Unfortunately, Federico Ubaldo was to die at the young age of 17 years, and the Rovere family would cease to rule.

The chapel was constructed next to city hall. The church interior once held a Sant'Ubaldo by Palma il Giovane, and a San Terenzio by Terenzio Terenzi. It holds the tombs of Guidobaldo II della Rovere, Duke of Urbino, and his wife Vittoria Farnese. Over the years it has become the temple used for official ceremonies of the city, and has become a temple for the memory of those from Pesaro who died (caduti) in the World Wars.
