= Pieve di Santo Stefano, Pesaro =

Church building in Pesaro, Italy

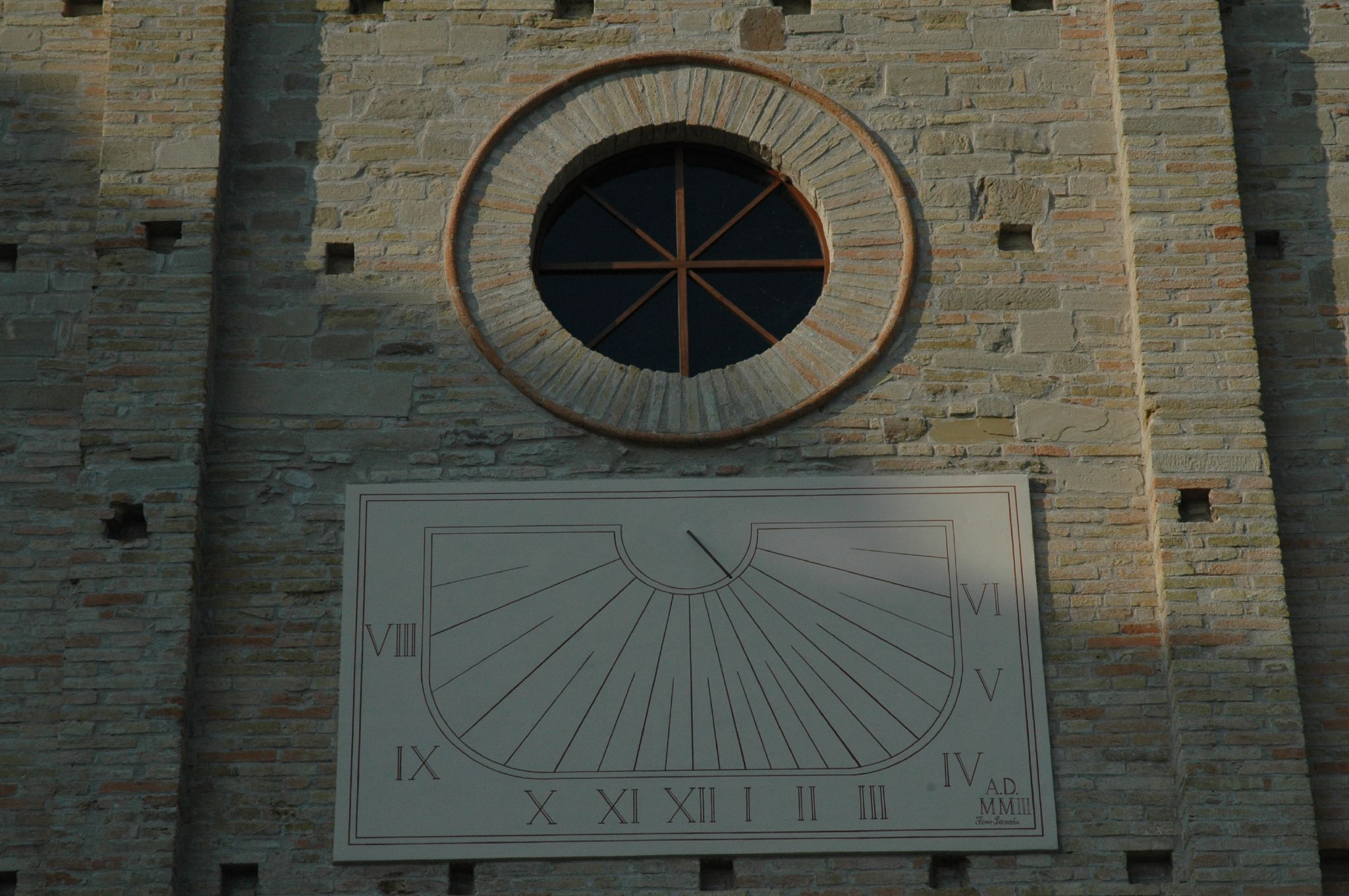
Facade detail showing the oculus window and sundial of Pieve di Santo Stefano in Candelara, Pesaro

The Pieve di Santo Stefano is a late-Gothic-style, Roman Catholic parish church located on via Pieve, 4 in the frazione of Candelara of Pesaro, region of Marche, Italy.

A church at the site is documented since the year 1000, but the current building is the result of a 15th-century reconstruction. Further reconstructions were performed over the centuries. The portal, planned in a Renaissance style, is incomplete. Among the works inside are:

- Madonna, Child, and Saints (1555) fresco by Ottaviano Zuccari
- Madonna, Child, and Saints (16th-century) attributed to Pompeo Morganti
- Madonna and Child, and Saints (16th-century) by il Rondolino
- Madonna in Glory and Saints (18th-century) Giovanni Giacomo Pandolfi
- Madonna of the Rosary (1628–1630) by Simone Cantarini and Claudio Ridolfi
