= Giuseppe Vaccai =

Italian painter and politician (1836–1912)

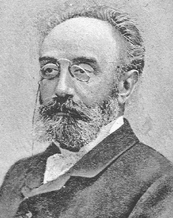

Giuseppe Vaccai (August 21, 1836 – 1912) was an Italian painter, mainly of landscapes.

== Biography ==
He was born in Pesaro. His father was a well-known music composer, and Vaccai did not dedicate himself to painting until after twenty years of age. The family sent him to the Sapienza University of Rome to train as a lawyer. But in Rome, his fellow Pesarese, Cavaliere Carlo Gavardini, introduced him to the landscape artist, Jean-Achille Benouville who took him in his studio. His canvases reproduce the pine forests of Ravenna as well as the valleys and coasts of central Italy. Among his works are: Il fosso Ghiaia a Ravenna; Sulle sponde del Nera; Intorno alla Pineta; The Adriatic Beach in Pesaro; and Albacina. In 1870 at Parma, he exhibited a Vallala di Poschiavo dal monte Cavagna. In 1877 at Naples, he exhibited a Fosso Ghiaia nella Pineta di Ravenna and a Paesaggio. Among his works exhibited in Turin, Milan, Rome and Bologna, were: In riva all' Adriatico; Sulle colline; Marina di Pesaro a levante; Marina di Pesaro verso Cattolica; Le foci di Piobbico; Stazione di Foligno; and Appennino Metaurense. He became an associate member of the Royal Academy of Fine Arts in Bologna and in his last decade became a deputy in parliament.
