= Palazzo Baldassini, Pesaro =

Coordinates: 43.9091°N 12.9145°E

The Palazzo Baldassini is a Renaissance-style palace located on Via San Francesco d'Assisi in the city of Pesaro, region of the Marche, Italy.

== History ==
The palace was built in the second half of the 16th century for the Marchese Ranieri Del Monte. The design has been attributed to either Filippo Testi or Guidubaldo Del Monte. Soon after completion, the palace was acquired by Marcantonio Gozzer. In 1715, his daughter Chiara Gozzer married marchese Francesco Maria Baldassini. The facade remains incomplete in brick, but the 16th-century main portal in stone remains with its superior balcony. the palace was the home of the nature scholar Francesco Baldassini.
