= Monteciccardo =

- Frazione
- Location of Monteciccardo in Italy
- Country: Italy
- Region: Marche
- Province: Pesaro e Urbino (PU)
- Comune: Pesaro

Population
  - Total: 1,626
- Demonym: monteciccardesi
- Time zone: UTC+1 (CET)
  - Summer (DST): UTC+2 (CEST)
- Postal code: 61122

Monteciccardo is a frazione of Pesaro, and former comune, in the Province of Pesaro e Urbino in the Italian region Marche, located about 60 kilometres (37 mi) northwest of Ancona and about 14 kilometres (9 mi) southwest of Pesaro. It was a separate comune until 2020.

Monteciccardo borders the following municipalities: Mombaroccio, Montefelcino, Montelabbate, Pesaro, Sant'Angelo in Lizzola, Serrungarina, Urbino.
