= San Giacomo, Pesaro =

Church in Pesaro, Italy

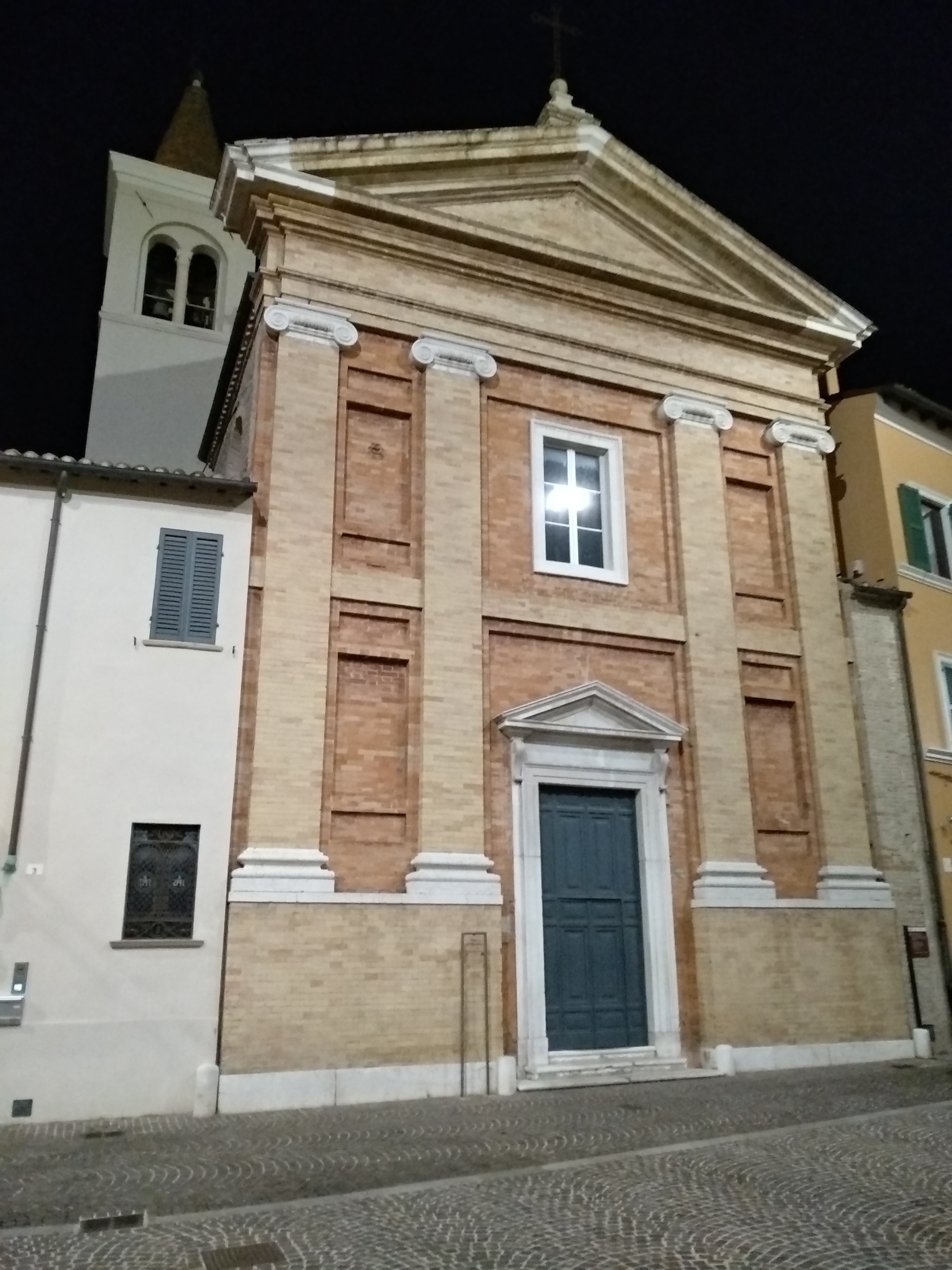
Front of San Giacomo Church

San Giacomo is a church located on Piazza Olivieri in central Pesaro, region of Marche, Italy.

== History ==
The present church owes its layout to a 17th-century baroque-style reconstruction of a prior 15th-century church. The reconstruction re oriented the church in an opposite direction. One remnant of the prior church is a fresco fragment in the belltower of the Madonna della Pace. The present façade was designed in 1825 in Neoclassical style by Giuseppe Olmeda. The interior contains canvases by Agostino Castellaci and Pietro Tedeschi; and a funeral monument of Count Annibale Olivieri, designed by the architect Giannandrea Lazzarini and provided with sculptures by the sculptor Sebastiano Pantanelli.

An inventory from 1864 lists the main altarpiece as an Enthroned Madonna with Angels in the style of Giovanni Sanzio.
