= Pieve di Ginestreto, Pesaro =

Church building in Ginestreto, Italy

Coordinates: 43°49′50″N 12°48′56″E

San Pietro Apostolo in Rosis in Ginestreto is a baptismal parish church or pieve, located on Via della Libertà #2 in the frazione of Ginestreto, a hamlet inland from Pesaro, in the province of Pesaro and Urbino, region of Marche, Italy.

== History ==
A church at the site was founded in the 7th to 8th centuries. An ancient Roman sarcophagus, once used as a water basin, was formerly found at the church, and now in the Diocesan museum. Documents from 1290 recall a Parochia Sancti Petri extra moenia Genestreti. The present parish church, located inside the walls of town, dates to the 14th century, with an inscription in the bell-tower stating Anno 1384 Henricus me fecit. In 1565, this new church was consecrated; it now has external Gothic-style decorations such as a façade with mullioned windows and a central rose window, likely added in the recent centuries. The body of San Lattanzio is said to be buried under the main altar.
