= Vincenzo Leonardi =

Italian botanical illustrator

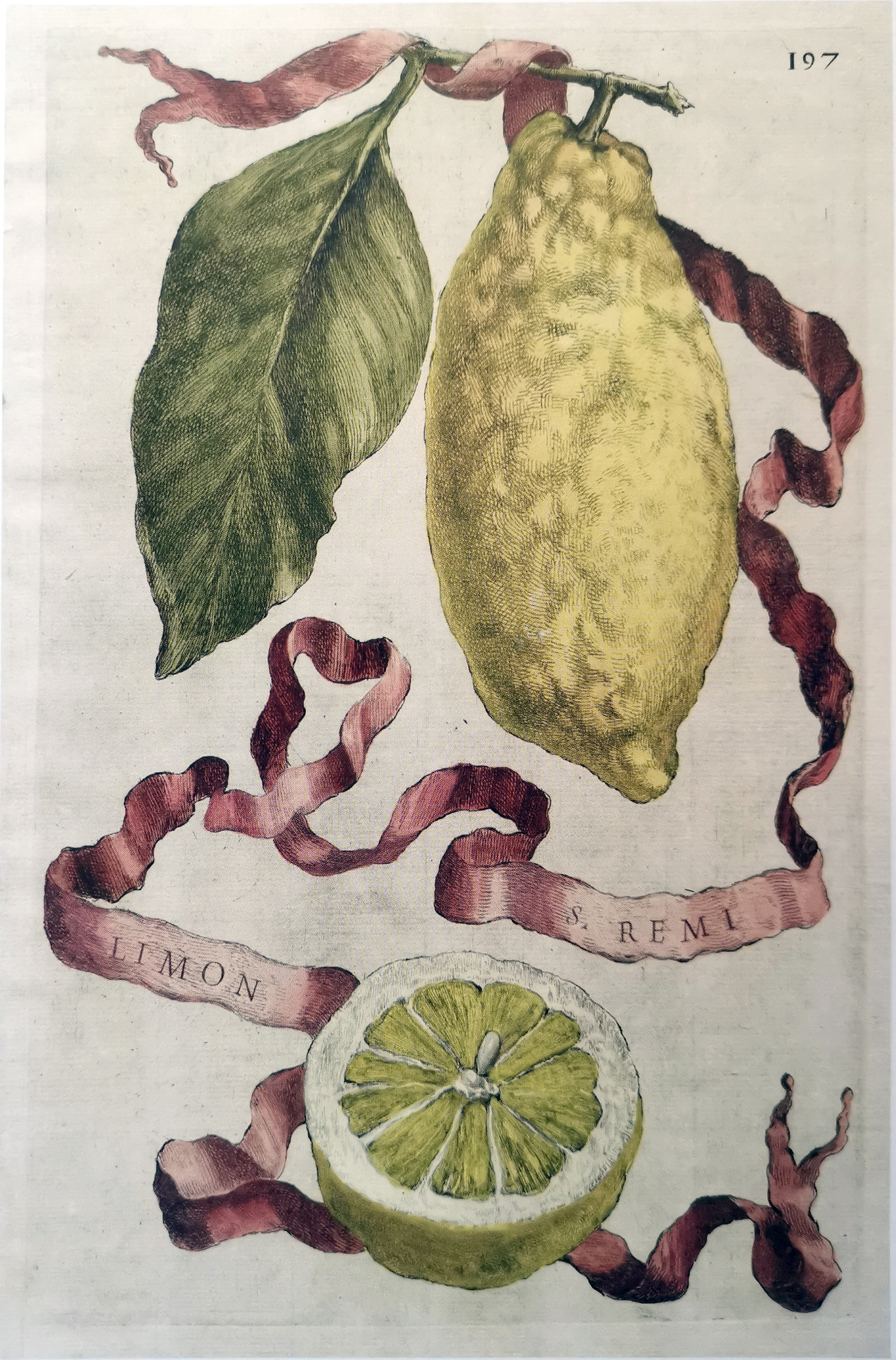
Plate from 'Hesperides'

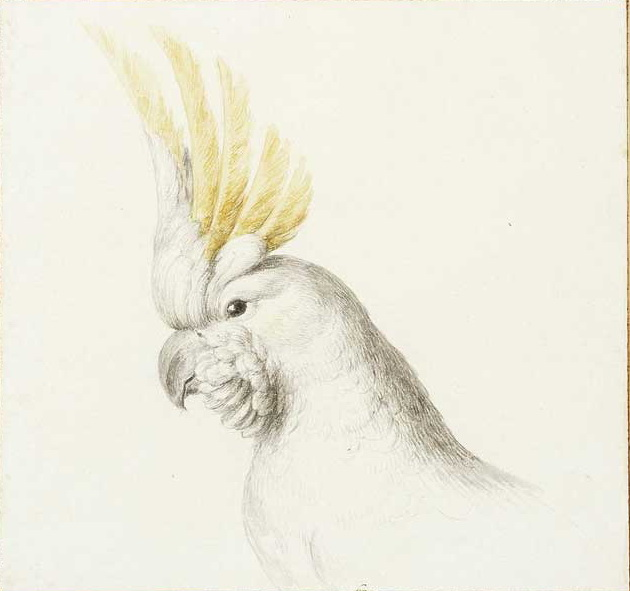
Cacatua sulphurea

Vincenzo Leonardi (ca. 1590 Rome – ca. 1646 Rome) was an Italian illustrator of natural history, who for some 20 years collaborated with Cassiano dal Pozzo (1588–1657), a prominent member of the Lincean Academy and noted art collector from Turin.

Leonardi had been a student of Antonio Tempesta, and was responsible for the plates in 'Uccelliera', an ornithological collection published in 1622 and which was curated by Cassiano and the editor Pietro Olina, and printed by Francesco Villamena. His plates illustrating the citrus family were engraved by Cornelius Bloemaert for use in the Jesuit scholar from Siena, Giovanni Battista Ferrari's book 'Hesperides'.
