= Oliviero Leonardi =

Italian painter and sculptor (1921 – 2019)

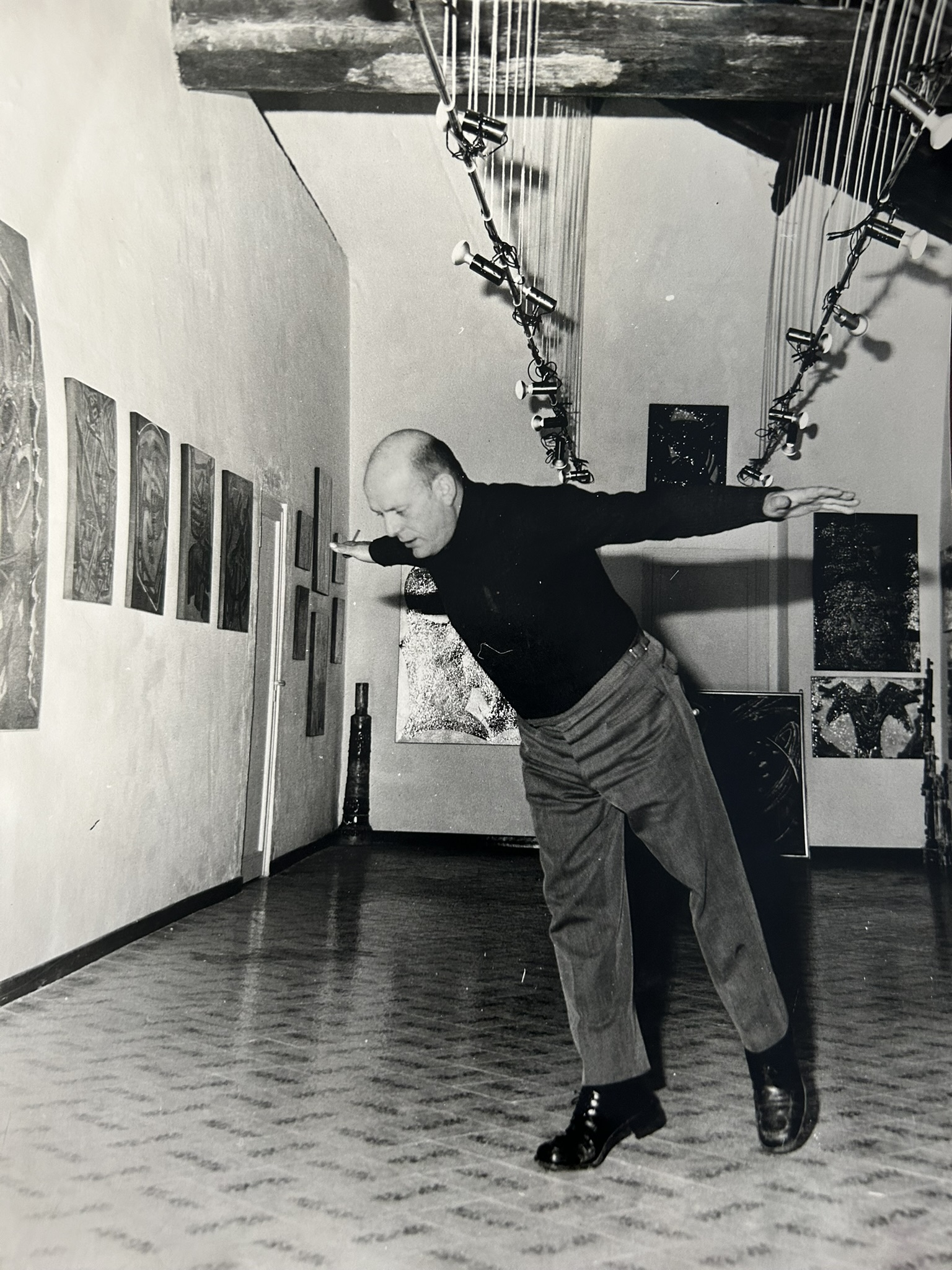
- Oliviero Leonardi in his art studio, Rome 1970s
- Born: 7 July 1921; Vezzano, Trentino, Italy
- Died: 30 January 2019; Jonzac, Charente-Maritime, France
- Occupations: Painter, sculptor

Oliviero Leonardi (7 July 1921 – 30 January 2019) was an Italian art painter and sculptor based in Rome. He was known for his ceramic paintings on steel plates, enamelled in ovens at 900 degrees Celsius. His artistic research focused on, among other subjects, cosmogony.

== Early life ==
Leonardi was born in 1921 in Vezzano, Trentino in Italy. He was a member of a family of ceramists from Trentino, learning skills and spending time during his youth in his father’s kiln.

After the war, he spent 6 years on the island of Capri where he devoted himself to philosophical and artistic studies, discovering oriental philosophy, and esoteric symbols of primitive languages. He expanded his creative experiences with wood, clay, plastics and canvas, and discovered the possibilities of high temperatures and steel.

== Work ==
He travelled to Florence, Venice, Paris, Ravenna and Rome in addition to Capri. In Rovereto, he was discovered by Fortunato Depero, who became a friend and advisor.

He was a member of the Associazione Nazionale del Libero Pensiero Giordano Bruno in Rome. In 1965, he was a speaker at Congresso Internazionale di Ceramira in San Marino and at Convegno d'Arte di Verrucchio.

Leonardi created ceramic paintings on steel at "high-fire". His creative process involved painting on steel plates fired and enamelled in ovens at 900 degrees Celsius. His artistic research focused, among others, on the subject of cosmogony and was influenced by surrealism.

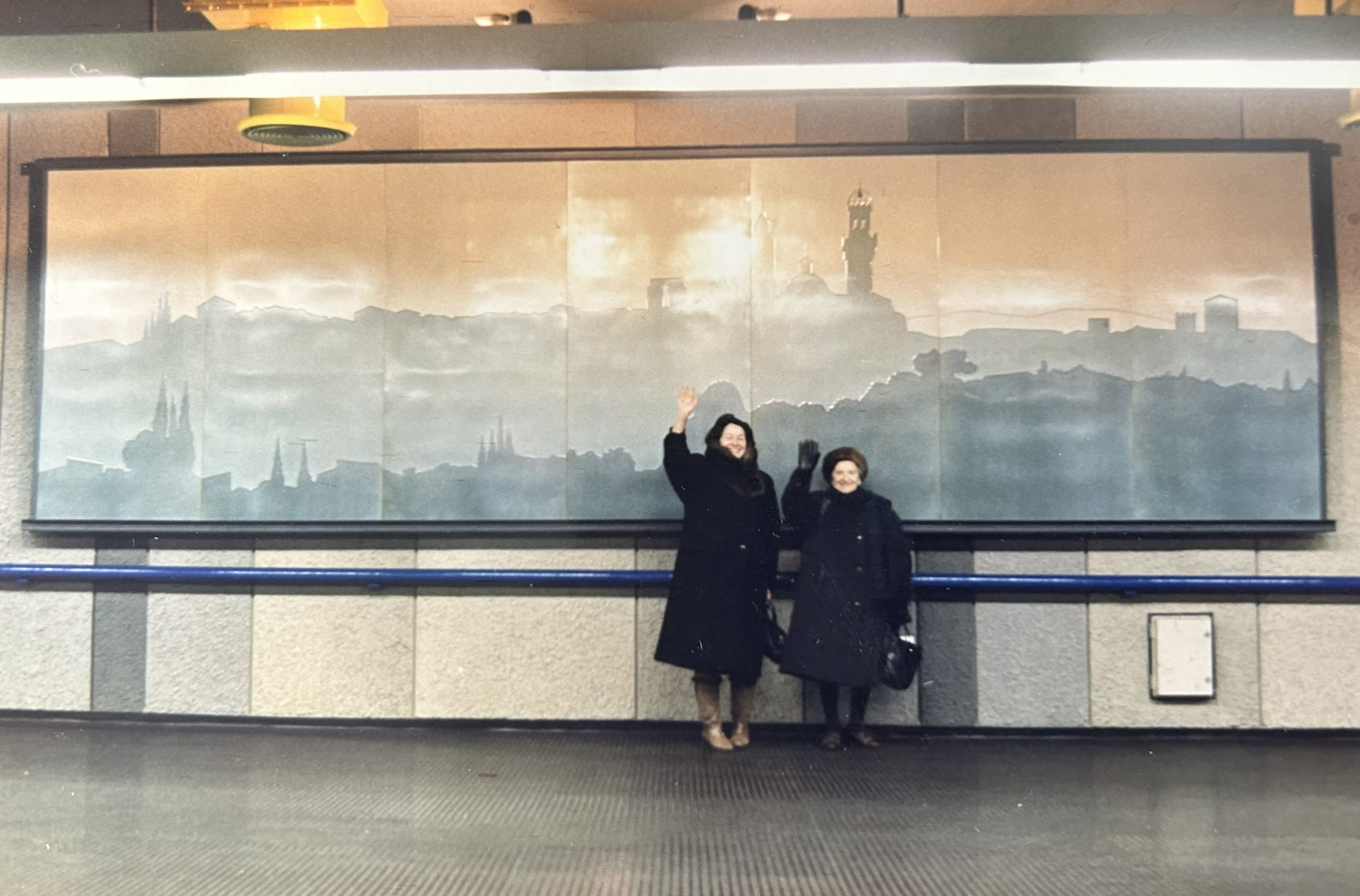
Oliviero Leonardi's largest ceramic painting on steel exhibited in the Subway of Rome in 1990

Leonardi created his art studio at Via Aurelia Antica 289, an old ruined farmhouse that he rehabilitated in the outskirts of Rome within the premises of Villa Doria Pamphili. In 1972, he founded the Romacrea art school at Via Aurelia Antica 289.

In October 1974, he was nominated Professor of Modern Arts by Michele Tana, the Rector of the Libera Accademia Laurentina in Rome. German art historian Gustav René Hocke wrote a monograph on Leonardi in 1978. Leonardi's work reviewed by Giulio Carlo Argan, Philippe Fontana, Aldo Del Gaudio, and Dolores Montane.

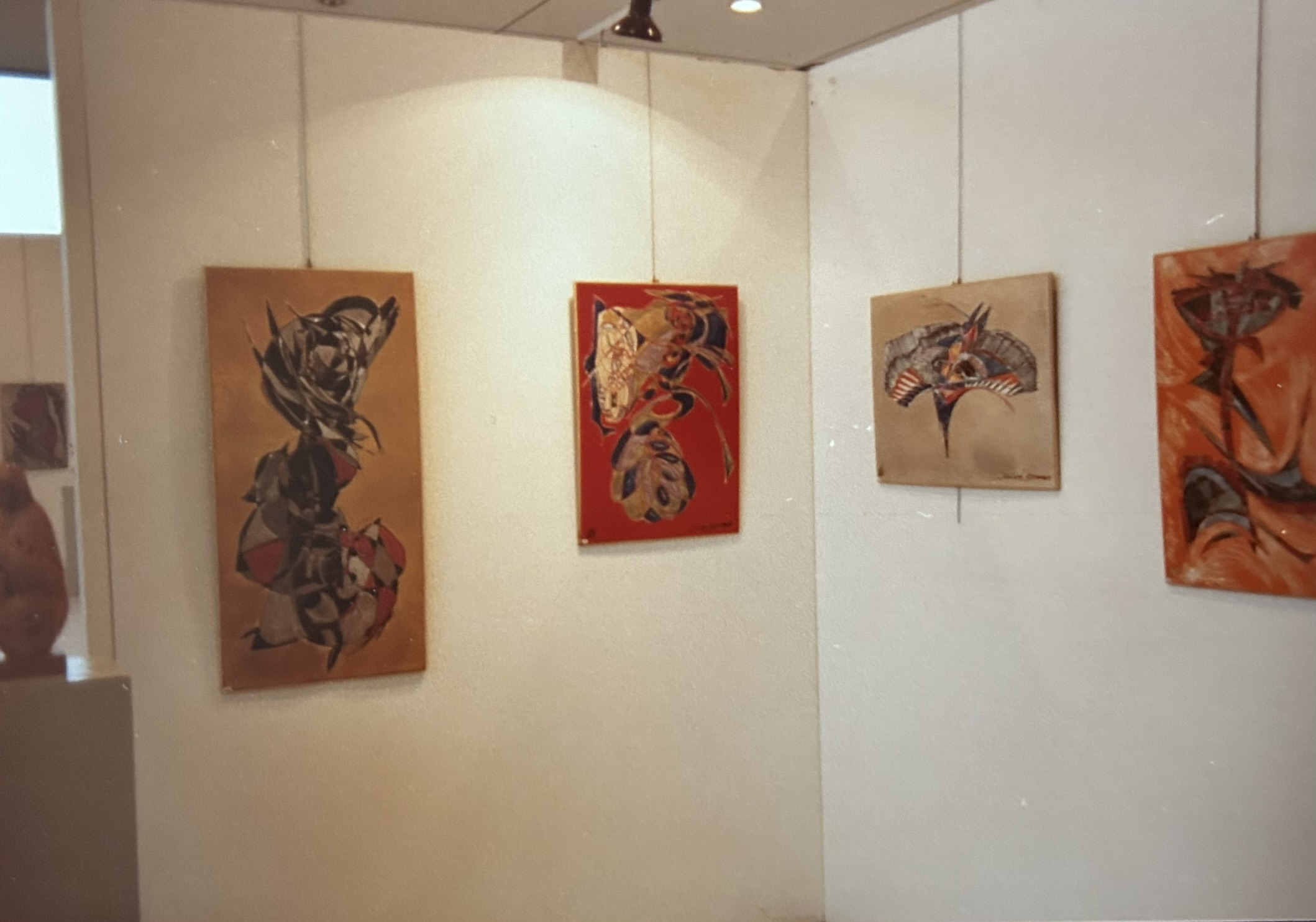
Oliviero Leonardi's exhibition at Saarland Museum in 1978

His work was exhibited in Italy, Spain, Monaco, Germany, Luxembourg and France (including Galerie Drouant). He exhibited with artists including Giorgio De Chirico, Salvador Dalí and Joan Miró during the Contemporary Art Exhibition in 1975 in Fiuggi, Italy.

Leonardi was commissioned to create works for public spaces, including a temporary project the subway of the Municipality of Rome and the Pan American Airlines headquarters in New York, Pan Air do Brasil, Rio de Janeiro, as well as United Arab Airlines, Cairo.

He died in Charentes-Maritimes in France in 2019.

== Exhibitions ==
- 1974: 6 + 7 Club Europe, from 16 to 26 April 1974 – Milan, Italy
- 1976: the Galerie des Arts Contemporains, December 1976 – Monte-Carlo, Principality of Monaco
- 1977: Galerie Drouant, from 10 to 28 February 1977 – Paris, France
- 1977: Maschio Angioino from 26 October 1977 to 9 November 1977 – Naples, Italy
- 1986: VIII International Biennale of Limoges on the Art of Enamel, July to August 1986 – Limoges, France
- 1986: Castello Colonna as part of the Genazzano’86 Internazionale d’Arte, November 1986 – Genazzano, Italy
