= Alessandro Lionardi =

Italian Renaissance poet

- Citizenship: Paduan
- Writing career
- Period: mid-16th century
- Notable works: Dialogi, Rime di M. Alessandro Lionardi

Alessandro Lionardi or Leonardi was an Italian poet from Padua, active in the mid-16th century. He was a doctor of law, and author of an important treatise on poetry and rhetoric, the Dialogi (Italian: dialoghi, or "dialogues"). He is the author of the texts of Alfonso Ferrabosco's five-voice madrigals Vidi pianger madonna and Come dal ciel seren rugiada sole.

== Published works ==
The published works of Lionardi include:

- Rime di M. Alessandro Lionardi gentil'huomo padouano: la uita il fine, e'l di loda la sera. Venetia: Al segno del Griffio [J. Gryphius], 1547
- Il secondo libro delle rime di messer Alessandro Lionardi nobile padovano. In Vinegia: appresso Gabriel Giolito de Ferrari et fratelli, 1550
- Dialogi di Messer Alessandro Lionardi, della inventione poetica: et insieme di quanto alla istoria et all'arte oratoria s'appartiene, et del modo di finger la favola. Venetia: Plinio Pietrasanta, 1554
- Oratio latina eccellentis domini Alexandri Leonardi in laudem Pij Quarti Summi Pontificis (in Latin) and Oratione volgare dell'eccellente M. Alessandro Lionardi. Al beatiss. e santissimo N. Sig. Papa Pio Quarto. Dedicata all'illustriss. e reverendiss. sig. card. Borromeo (in Italian). Patavii [Padova]: ad instantiam Antonii Alciati, 1565
