= Matilde Leonardi =

Italian neurologist, paediatrician and specialist in neurorehabilitation

- Born: Pesaro, Italy
- Occupations: Neurologist, paediatrician
- Known for: Research into neurological aspects of ageing and disability, on ICF and its biopsychosocial model and research on disorders of consciousness
- Awards: Italian Excellence for Research, 2019

Matilde Leonardi is an Italian neurologist and paediatrician. At present, she is Director of the Neurology, Public Health, and Disability Unit and of the Coma Research Centre at the Carlo Besta Neurological Institute in Milan. She is a FEAN, (Fellow of the European Academy of Neurology) and a WHO expert and consultant on neurology, disability, ageing and policy development who is co-chair of the WHO NeuroCOVID Forum group on essential neurological services for COVID-19 recoverers. Leonardi has also been a World Federation of Neurorehabilitation (WFNR) Presidium adjunct member since June 2024, after her mandate as Praesidium member for 4 years. She was elected for a second mandate as Chair of the Communication Committee of the European Academy of Neurology in July 2024.

== Early training ==
Matilde Leonardi was born in Pesaro in the Italian region of Marche. She qualified as a doctor of medicine, specialising in neurology and in paediatrics, with further studies on neonatology, pediatric neurology and bioethics.

== Career ==
Leonardi teaches at the Università Cattolica del Sacro Cuore in Milan, where she became an associate professor of neurology in 2014 and a full professor of rehabilitation in 2015. She teaches neuropsychiatric aspects of disability for a special master's degree. Since 2007, she has been on the Board of Directors of the Bioethics Centre at that University.

Leonardi works as a researcher and team leader at the Carlo Besta Neurological Institute (INNCB). At that Institute, she develops and carries out research projects related to neurology, chronic diseases, employment, disability, ageing, public health, neurorehabilitation and the burdens of neurological disorders. Her team has one of the largest epidemiological databases on these types of illnesses worldwide. She is co-chair of the World Health Organization (WHO)-FIC (Family of International Classifications) Functioning and Disability Reference Group (FDRG) and Director of the Italian WHO Collaborating Centre Research Branch. She also coordinates several European projects, including COURAGE (Collaborative research on Ageing) and Mhadie (Measuring Health and Disability in Europe).

Since 1995, Leonardi has been working with the WHO on the International Classification of Functioning, Disability and Health (ICF) and has been co-chair of the WHO ICF children's group. Since 2001, she has been the coordinator of several research projects funded by the EU and others. From March 2020, she has been leading NEUROCOVID research at the institute. Leonardi also consults on public health, and on Convention on the Rights of Persons with Disabilities (UNCRPD) monitoring and disability policy development, having worked with several national governments. She has been an expert for the European Commission on public health, ageing, disability and neurosciences. She was one of the founders of the European Brain Council in 2002 and is responsible for that council's liaison with the WHO. From 2010 to 2013, she was president of the Italian Scientific Committee on disability, monitoring its UNCRPD implementation. She has been vice-president of the Italian Federation of Neurological Associations. In November 2011, she was appointed by the Vatican as a corresponding member of the Pontifical Academy for Life or Pontificia Accademia Pro Vita. In September 2020, she was nominated as Fellow of the European Academy of Neurology. She was nominated as a member of the National Bioethics Committee in 2022.

== Honours and awards ==
- In December 2019 Leonardi was appointed "Italian Excellence for Research", upon nomination of the Ministry of Health, as one of the 100 "Italian Excellences, 2019".
