= Giovanni Giacomo Pandolfi =

Italian painter

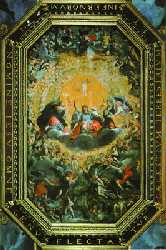
Ceiling of the Church of Nome di Dio in Pesaro, by G.G. Pandolfi, 1617–1619.

Giovanni Giacomo Pandolfi (1567–1636) was an Italian painter, who was born and lived in Pesaro.

== Biography ==
He was likely the son of the painter Giovanni Antonio Pandolfi, also from Pesaro, who had married the sister of the painter Girolamo Danti.

Gian Giacomo studied with Federico and Taddeo Zuccari, but was strongly influenced by another artist, Federico Barocci. His best known work adorns the ceiling and the Oratory of the Nome di Dio, in Pesaro, which was realized from 1617 to 1619. He has also many paintings in other churches and convents, such as in the Church of Sant'Andrea in Pesaro, in the Church of San Gimignano in Sant'Angelo in Vado, and in the Church of San Pietro in Valle in Fano.

His style follows the Emilian mannerism, characterized by the sfumato of colors and well rounded human bodies. Among his students were Simone Cantarini and Domenico Peruzzini.
