= Girolamo Danti =

Italian painter

Girolamo Danti (1547 – 1580) was an Italian painter of the Renaissance period, active in Perugia. His brother Ignazio Danti was an Italian priest, mathematician, astronomer, and cosmographer.
