= Pesaro =

Pesaro Pés're (Romagnol)
- Comune
- Città di Pesaro
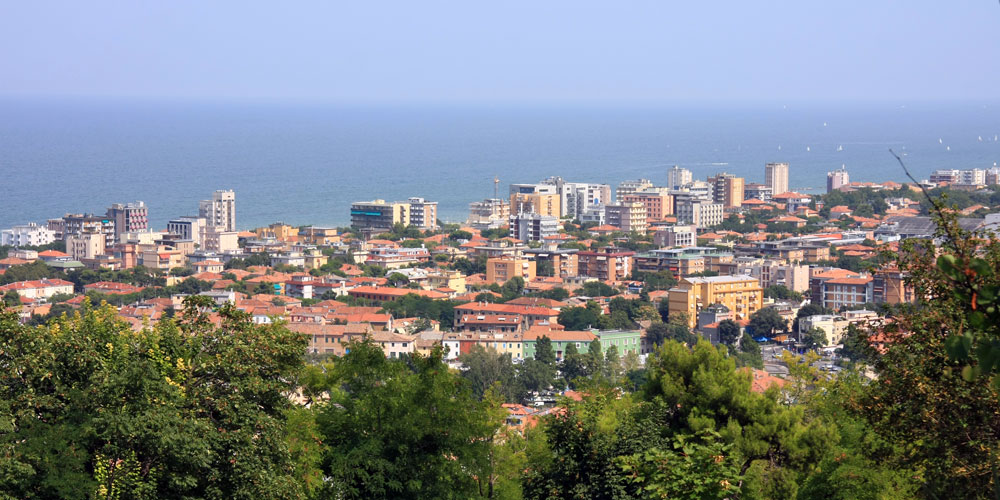
- View of Pesaro

- Flag Coat of arms

- Location within Italy Location within Marche
- Coordinates: 43°55′N 12°54′E
- Country: Italy
- Region: Marche
- Province: Pesaro e Urbino (PU)
- Frazioni: Borgo Santa Maria, Candelara, Case Bruciate, Casteldimezzo, Cattabrighe, Chiusa di Ginestreto, Colombarone, Fiorenzuola di Focara, Ginestreto, Monteciccardo, Novilara, Ponte Valle, Pozzo Alto, Santa Maria dell'Arzilla, Santa Marina Alta, Santa Veneranda, Trebbiantico, TrePonti, Villa Ceccolini, Villa Fastiggi, Villa San Martin

Government
  - Mayor: Andrea Biancani (PD)

Area
  - Total: 126.77 km^{2} (48.95 sq mi)
- Elevation: 11 m (36 ft)

Population (2026)
  - Total: 95,270
  - Density: 751.5/km^{2} (1,946/sq mi)
- Demonym: Pesaresi
- Time zone: UTC+1 (CET)
  - Summer (DST): UTC+2 (CEST)
- Postal code: 61121, 61122
- Dialing code: 0721
- Patron saint: St. Terence
- Saint day: September 24
- Website: Official website

Pesaro (Italian: [ˈpeːzaro]; Romagnol: Pés're) is a city and comune (municipality) in the region of Marche in Italy, capital of the province of Pesaro and Urbino, on the Adriatic Sea. With a population of 95,270 as of 2026, it is the 2nd-largest city in Marche, after Ancona, and the 50th-largest in Italy.

Pesaro was dubbed the "Cycling City" (Città della bicicletta) by the Italian environmentalist association Legambiente in recognition of its extensive network of bicycle paths and promotion of cycling. It is also known as "City of Music" (Città della musica), for it is the birthplace of the composer Gioachino Rossini. In 2015, the Italian government applied for Pesaro to be declared a "Creative City" in UNESCO's World Heritage Sites. In 2017, Pesaro received the European City of Sport award, together with Aosta, Cagliari and Vicenza.

Local industries include fishing, furniture making and tourism. In 2020 it absorbed the former comune of Monteciccardo, now a frazione of Pesaro. Its frazione of Fiorenzuola di Focara is one of I Borghi più belli d'Italia ("The most beautiful villages of Italy").

== History ==
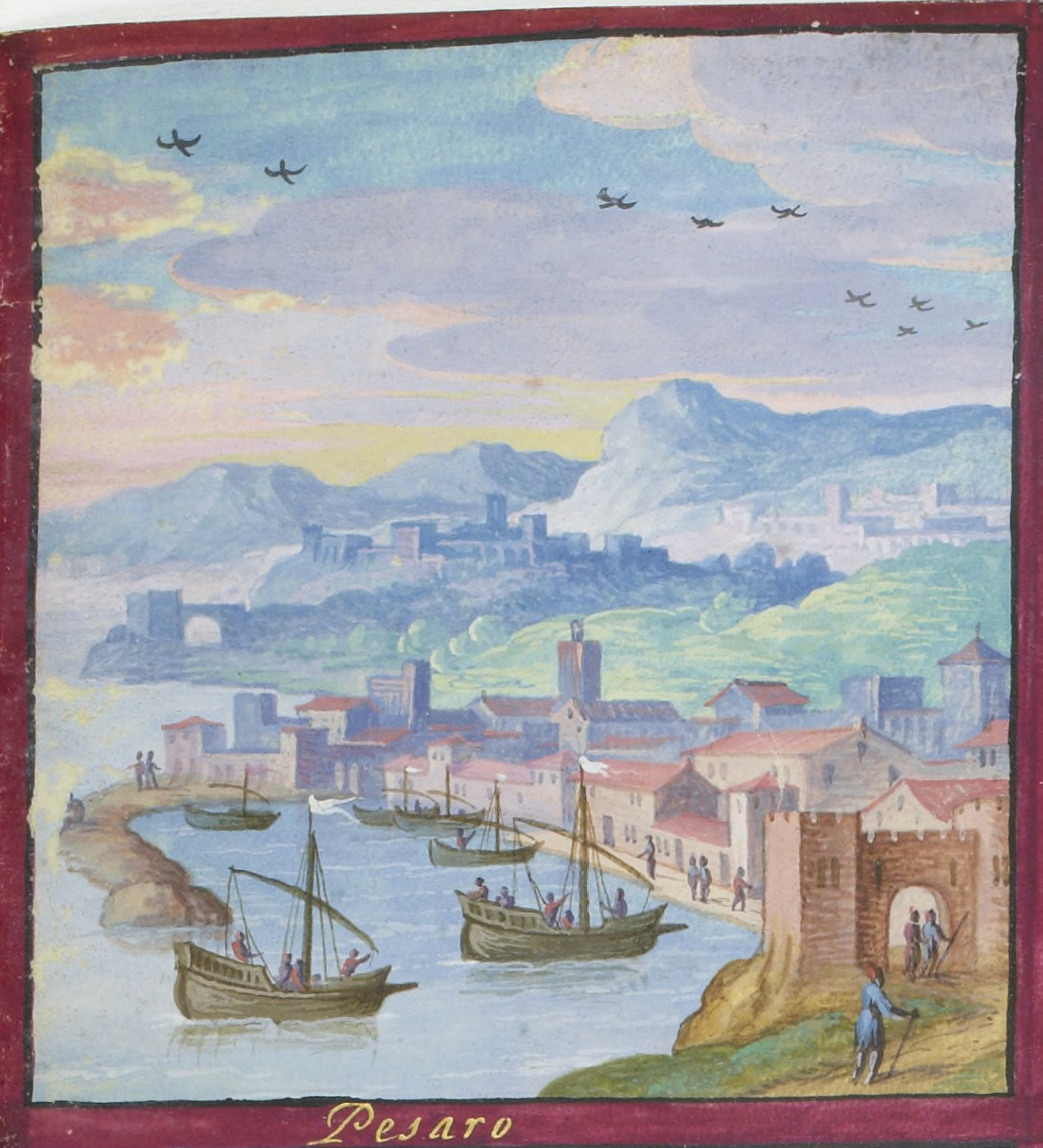
Pesaro, c. 1578, from Carlo Maggi's Codex Maggi

The city was established as Pisaurum by the Romans in 184 BC as a colony in the territory of the Picentes, the people who lived along the northeast coast during the Iron Age. In 1737, fourteen ancient votive stones were unearthed in a local farm field, each bearing the inscription of a Roman god; these were written in a pre-Etruscan script, showing a much earlier occupation of the area than the 184 BC Picentes colony.

A settlement of the Picentes tribe has been found at Novilara. The northern Picentes were invaded in the 4th century BC by the Gallic Senones, earlier by the Etruscans, and when the Romans reached the area the population was an ethnic mixture. The Roman separated and expelled the Gauls from the country.

Under the Roman administration Pesaro, a hub across the Via Flaminia, became an important centre of trading and craftmanship. After the fall of the Western Empire, Pesaro was occupied by the Ostrogoths, and destroyed by Vitigis (539) in the course of the Gothic War. Hastily rebuilt five years later after the Byzantine reconquest, it formed the so-called Pentapolis, part of the Exarchate of Ravenna. After the Lombard and Frankish conquests of that city, Pesaro became part of the Papal States.

During the Renaissance it was ruled successively by the houses of Montefeltro (1285–1445), Sforza (1445–1512) and Della Rovere (1513–1631). Under the last family, who selected it as capital of their duchy, Pesaro saw its most flourishing age, with the construction of numerous public and private palaces, and the erection of a new line of walls (the Mura Roveresche). In 1475, a legendary wedding took place in Pesaro, when Costanzo Sforza and Camilla d'Aragona married.

On 11 September 1860 Piedmontese troops entered the city, and after their win over the Papal States at the Battle of Castelfidardo 8 days later, Pesaro was subsequently annexed to the new Kingdom of Italy along with the entire Marche (and Umbria) regions.

Pesaro was significantly damaged in the 1916 Rimini earthquakes. Its historic centre was abandoned after the 16 August earthquake, leaving 14,000 displaced people crowded into 2,000 tents. Many villages in its hinterland also suffered collapsed buildings.

Various buildings in Pesaro were destroyed during World War 2, including historical buildings in the city center.

== Climate ==
Climate data for Pesaro (1998–2017)
Month	Jan	Feb	Mar	Apr	May	Jun	Jul	Aug	Sep	Oct	Nov	Dec	Year
Record high °C (°F)	19.0 (66.2)	20.5 (68.9)	25.2 (77.4)	29.4 (84.9)	33.4 (92.1)	37.4 (99.3)	38.1 (100.6)	38.4 (101.1)	36.4 (97.5)	28.0 (82.4)	25.0 (77.0)	21.8 (71.2)	38.4 (101.1)
Mean daily maximum °C (°F)	8.2 (46.8)	9.9 (49.8)	14.0 (57.2)	17.4 (63.3)	22.4 (72.3)	26.7 (80.1)	29.3 (84.7)	29.1 (84.4)	24.4 (75.9)	19.1 (66.4)	13.4 (56.1)	9.1 (48.4)	18.6 (65.5)
Daily mean °C (°F)	4.9 (40.8)	6.0 (42.8)	9.7 (49.5)	13.3 (55.9)	18.2 (64.8)	22.5 (72.5)	24.9 (76.8)	24.5 (76.1)	19.8 (67.6)	15.3 (59.5)	10.2 (50.4)	5.9 (42.6)	14.6 (58.3)
Mean daily minimum °C (°F)	2.2 (36.0)	2.7 (36.9)	5.8 (42.4)	8.9 (48.0)	13.2 (55.8)	17.2 (63.0)	19.5 (67.1)	19.4 (66.9)	15.5 (59.9)	12.0 (53.6)	7.5 (45.5)	3.3 (37.9)	10.6 (51.1)
Record low °C (°F)	−7.2 (19.0)	−12.8 (9.0)	−5.2 (22.6)	−1.4 (29.5)	4.6 (40.3)	7.0 (44.6)	11.2 (52.2)	11.2 (52.2)	6.2 (43.2)	3.0 (37.4)	−2.4 (27.7)	−9.2 (15.4)	−12.8 (9.0)
Average precipitation mm (inches)	54.6 (2.15)	60.1 (2.37)	69.2 (2.72)	69.0 (2.72)	54.6 (2.15)	61.4 (2.42)	45.5 (1.79)	57.3 (2.26)	97.2 (3.83)	85.4 (3.36)	93.8 (3.69)	78.1 (3.07)	826.2 (32.53)
Average relative humidity (%)	80	75	70	70	66	62	60	64	71	80	82	80	72
Source: COMUNE di PESARO

== Demographics ==
Historical population
Year	Pop.	±%
1861	29,496	—
1871	27,573	−6.5%
1881	28,904	+4.8%
1901	33,309	+15.2%
1911	36,620	+9.9%
1921	38,984	+6.5%
1931	42,412	+8.8%
1936	44,589	+5.1%
1951	54,113	+21.4%
1961	65,973	+21.9%
1971	84,719	+28.4%
1981	90,412	+6.7%
1991	88,713	−1.9%
2001	91,086	+2.7%
2011	94,237	+3.5%
2021	95,670	+1.5%
Source: ISTAT

As of 2026, the population is 95,270, of which 48.4% are males, and 51.6% are females. Minors make up 13.2% of the population, and seniors make up 27.4%.

=== Immigration ===
As of 2025, immigrants make up 12.3% of the population. The 5 largest foreign countries of birth are Moldova, Albania, Romania, Ukraine, and Peru.

== Sights ==
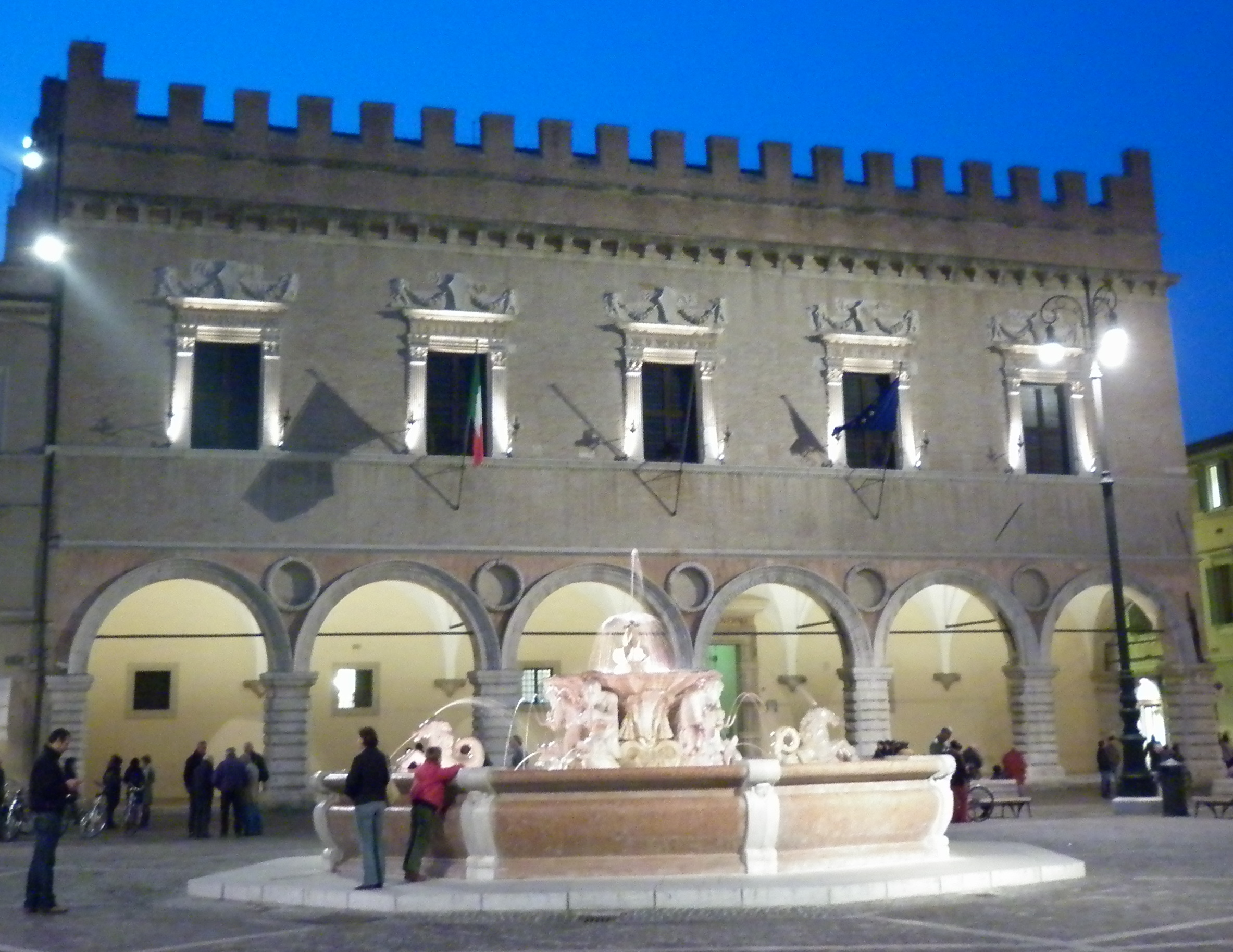
Palazzo Ducale

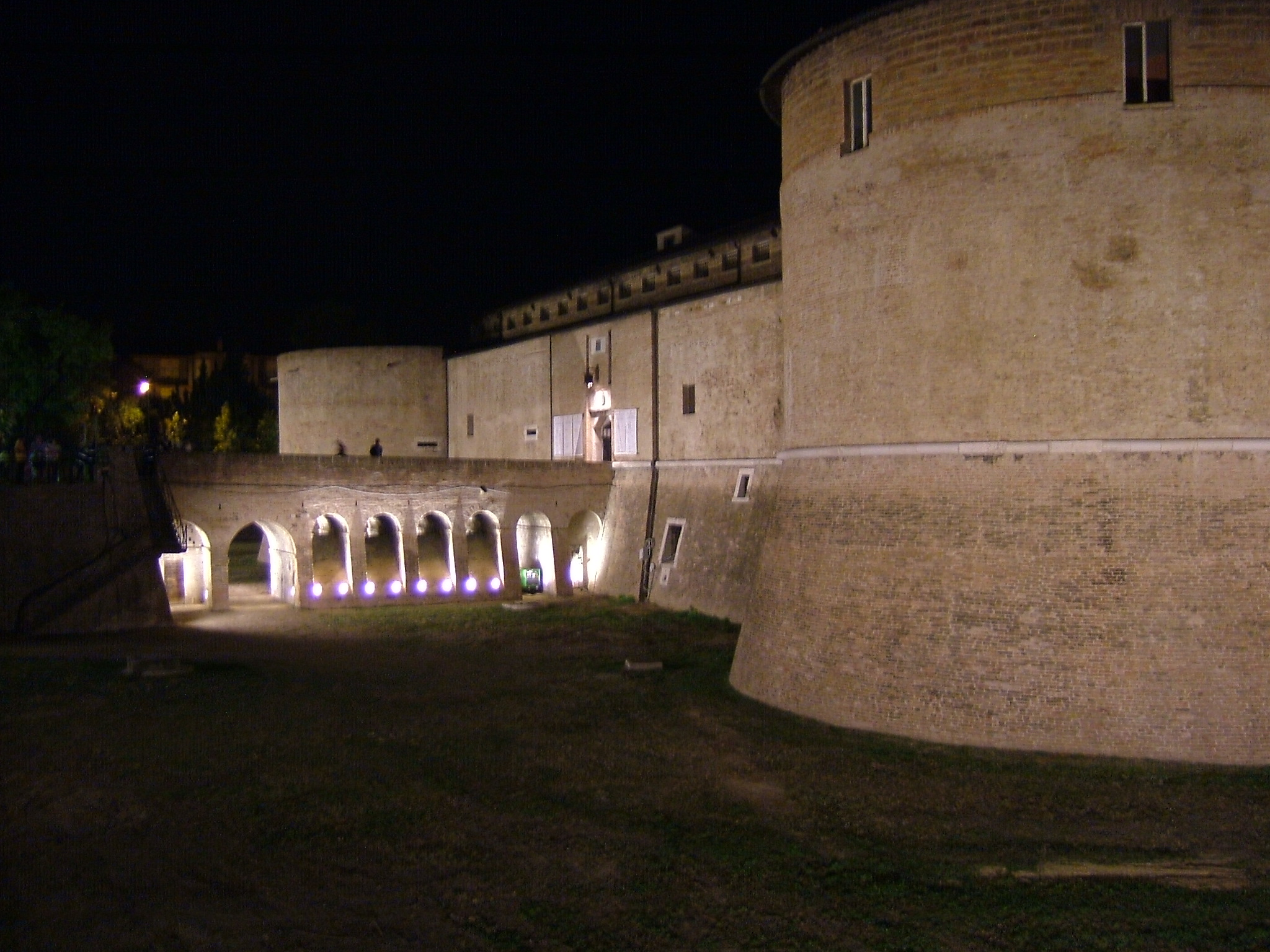
Rocca Costanza

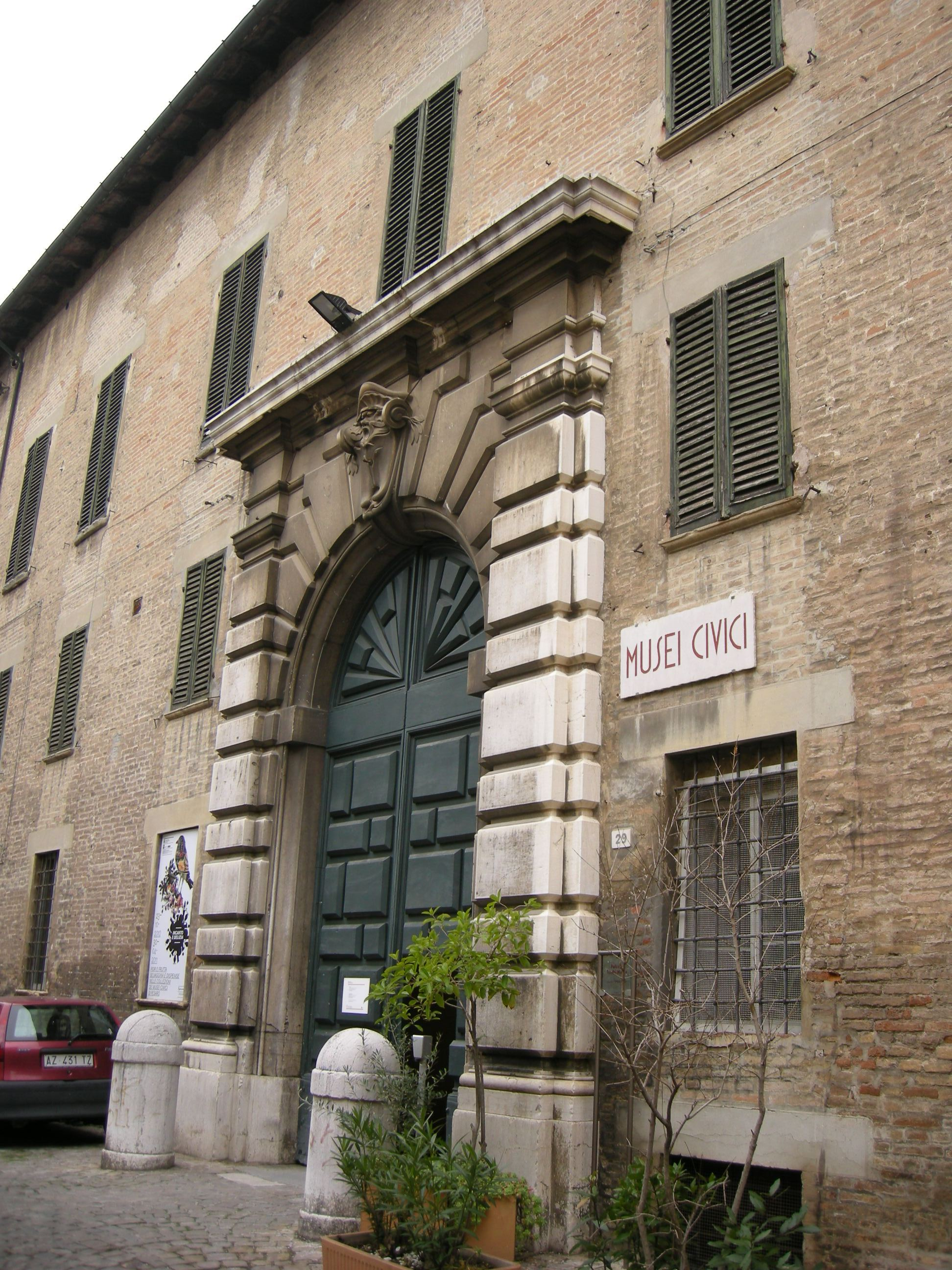
Musei Civici

=== Buildings and museums ===
- Ducal Palace (15th century): commissioned by Alessandro Sforza, the façade has a portico with six arcades supported by six heavy pilasters and an upper floor with five windows crowned by coats of arms, festoons and puttoes.
- Rocca Costanza (15th century): massive castle built by Costanzo I Sforza; it has a square plan with four cylindrical corner towers and a wide dry moat. Later used as prison.
- Villa Imperiale of Pesaro (c. 1530): suburban palace with gardens designed by Girolamo Genga for Duke Francesco Maria Della Rovere and his duchess Eleanora and built from c. 1530 onwards, stands atop the San Bartolo hill. Its sunken court is the direct precedent for the more famous one at the Roman Villa Giulia. Rooms are frescoed by prominent Mannerist painters Bronzino, Francesco Menzocchi, Girolamo Genga, and Raffaellino del Colle.
- Mura Roveresche (17th century): "Della Rovere Walls", demolished in the early 20th century), only two gates, Porta del Ponte and Porta Rimini, and a short section remain.
- Birthplace of Gioachino Rossini: now a museum dedicated to the composer, located at 34 Via Rossini. It has a museum with manifestos, prints, portraits and his spinet. Also some of his papers are on display at the Biblioteca della Fondazione Rossini housed in the Palazzo Montani Antaldi.
- Conservatorio Statale di Musica Gioachino Rossini: located in the 18th century Palazzo Olivieri–Machirelli on the Piazza Oliveri.
- Musei Civici di Palazzo Mosca: civic museum which contains mainly paintings and ceramics. Among the art is the Pesaro Altarpiece by Giovanni Bellini.
- Oliveriano Archeologic Museum and Oliveriana Library: archaeological Collection and Manuscript Library; founded in 1756 by Annibale degli Abati Olivieri.
- Villino Ruggeri: notable early 20th century art nouveau home, designed by Giuseppe Brega.

=== Churches and other religious buildings ===
- Pesaro Cathedral (5th-14th centuries): Romanesque-Gothic Basilica built over remains of a late Roman edifice and dedicated to St Terence during the Middle Ages. The façade, in Romanesque-Gothic style, is unfinished: it has a simple ogival portal surmounted by a band of small arches. A recent restoration has brought to light floor mosaics.
- The Baroque Sanctuary of Beata Vergine del Carmelo (18th century).
- Church of the Maternità
- Santissima Annunziata
- Oratory of the Nome di Dio
- San Giacomo
- San Giovanni Battista
- Sant'Agostino
- Santa Lucia
- Municipal Chapel of Sant'Ubaldo
- Church and Convent of the Girolimini
- Madonna del Porto
- Santa Maria delle Grazie
- Pieve di Ginestreto
- Pieve di Santo Stefano
- Santa Veneranda
- Sacred Grove of Lucus Pisaurensis, pre-Roman era sacerdotal lucus

== Culture ==
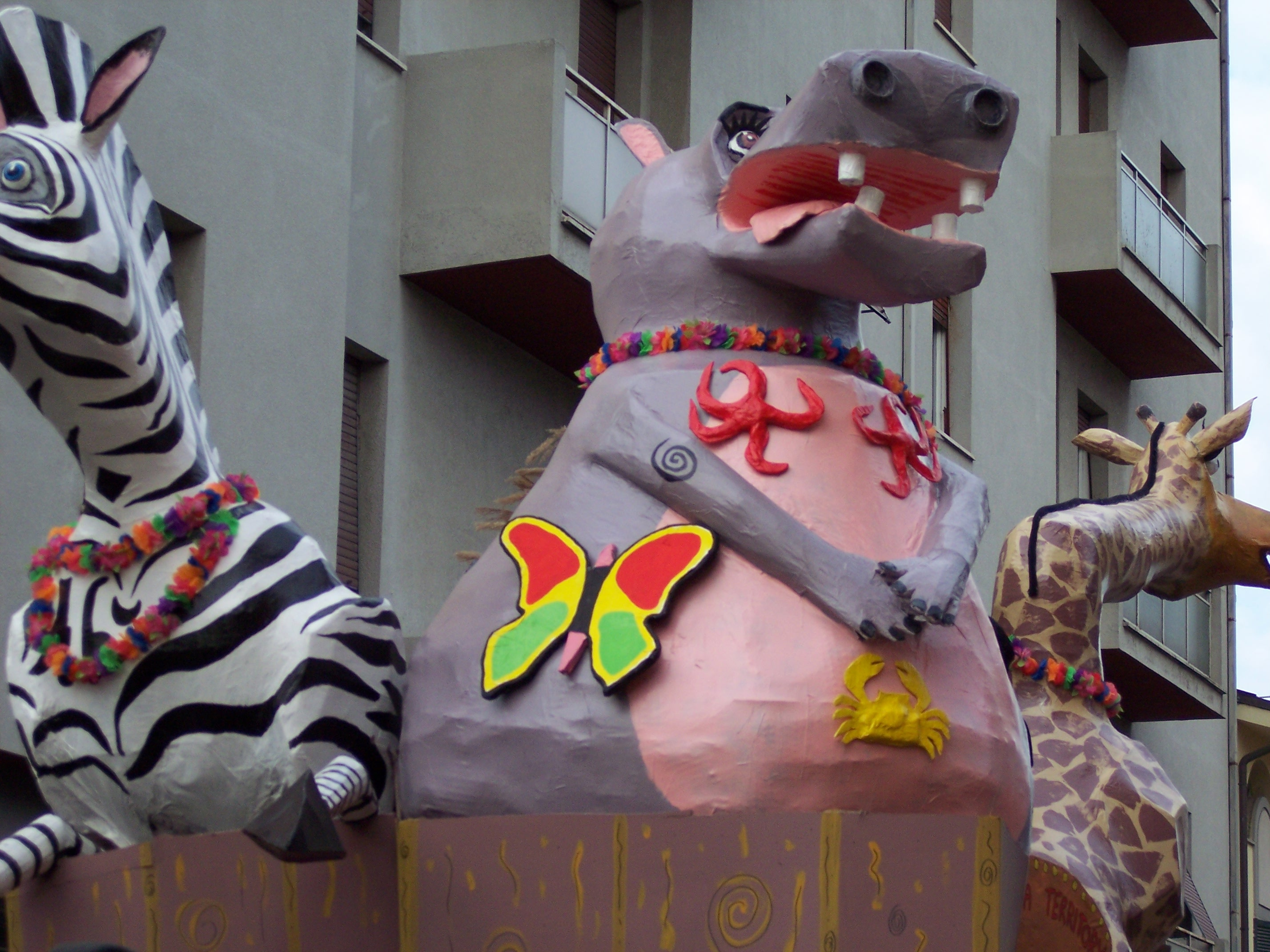

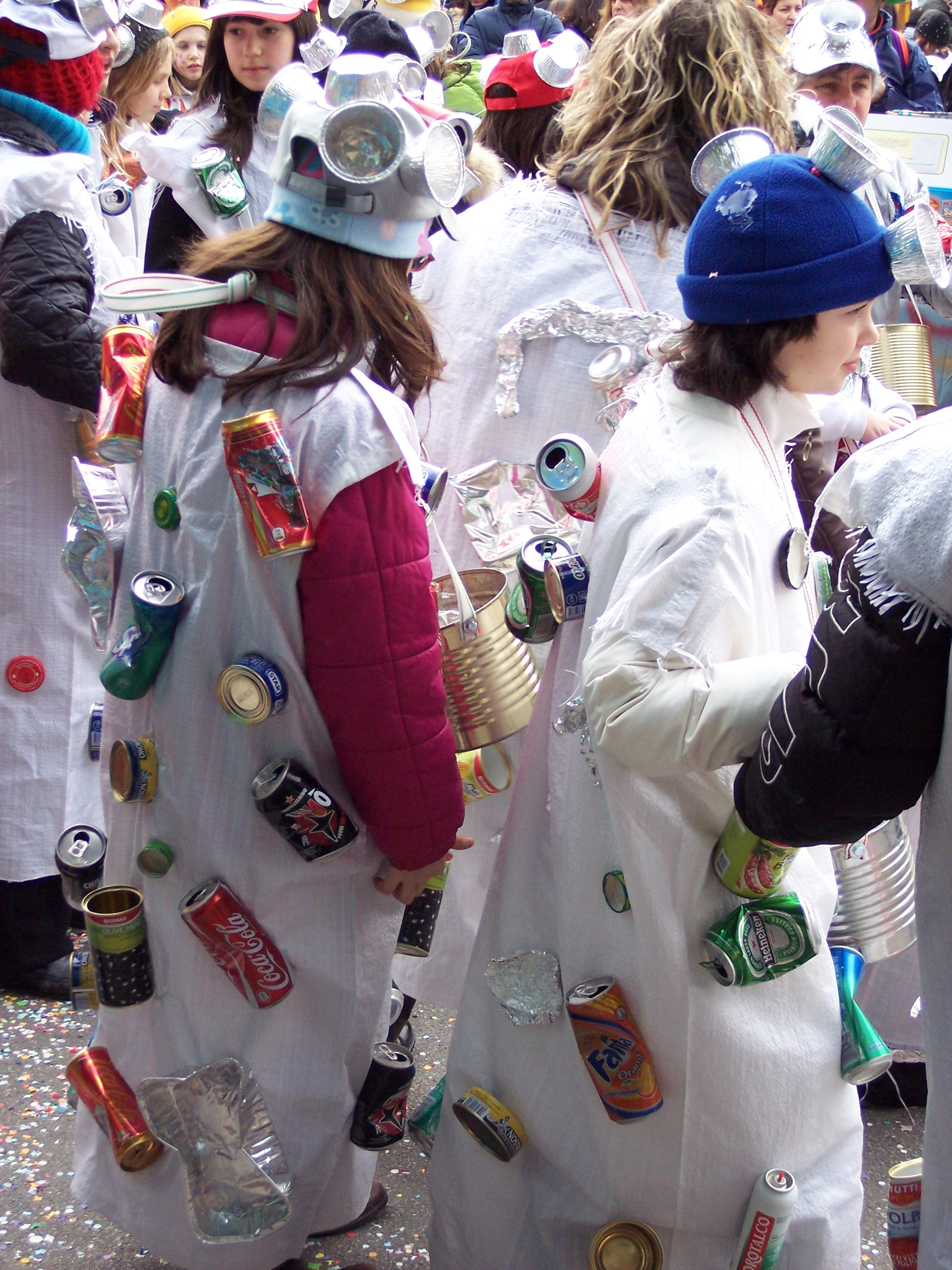

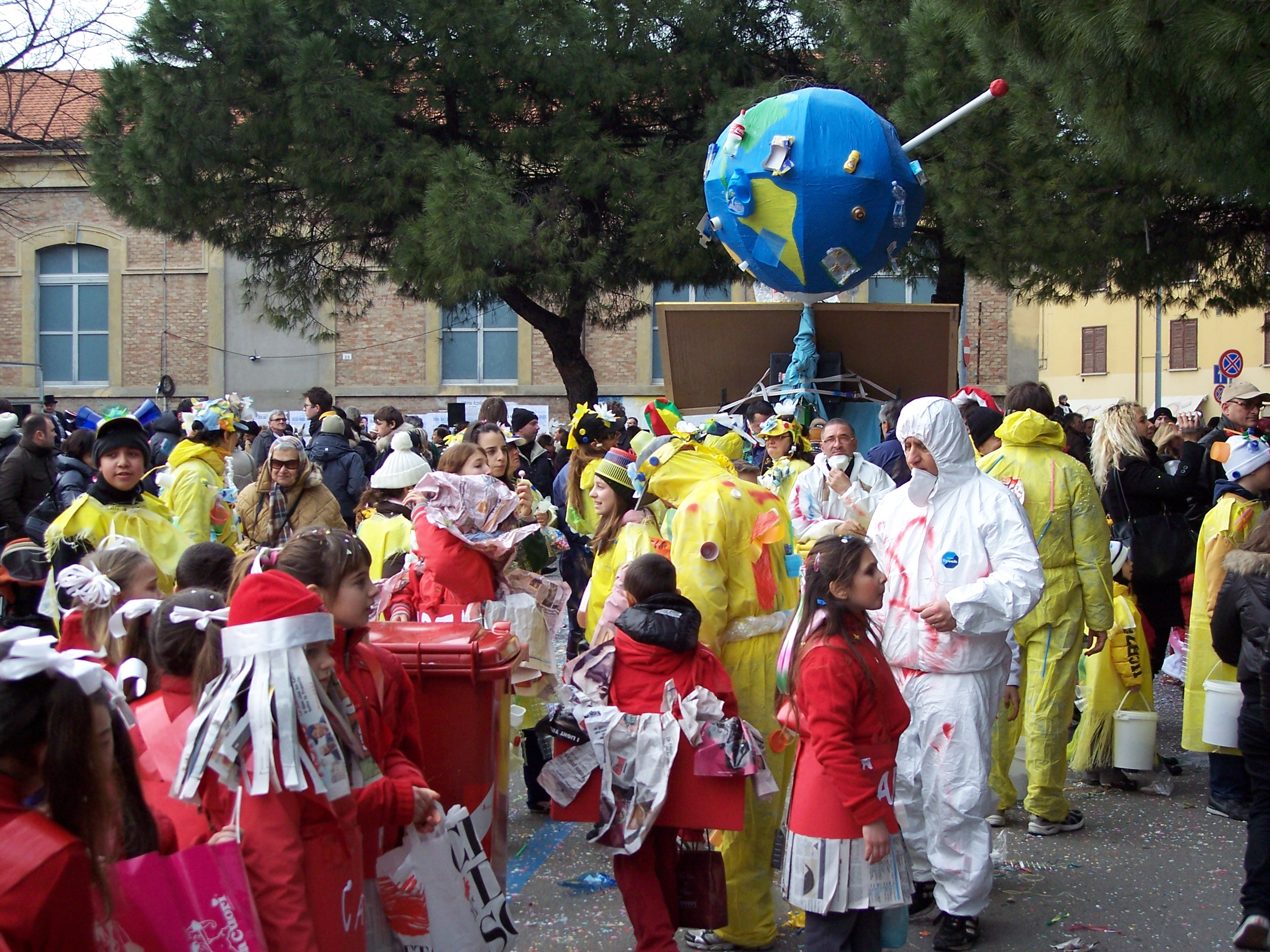

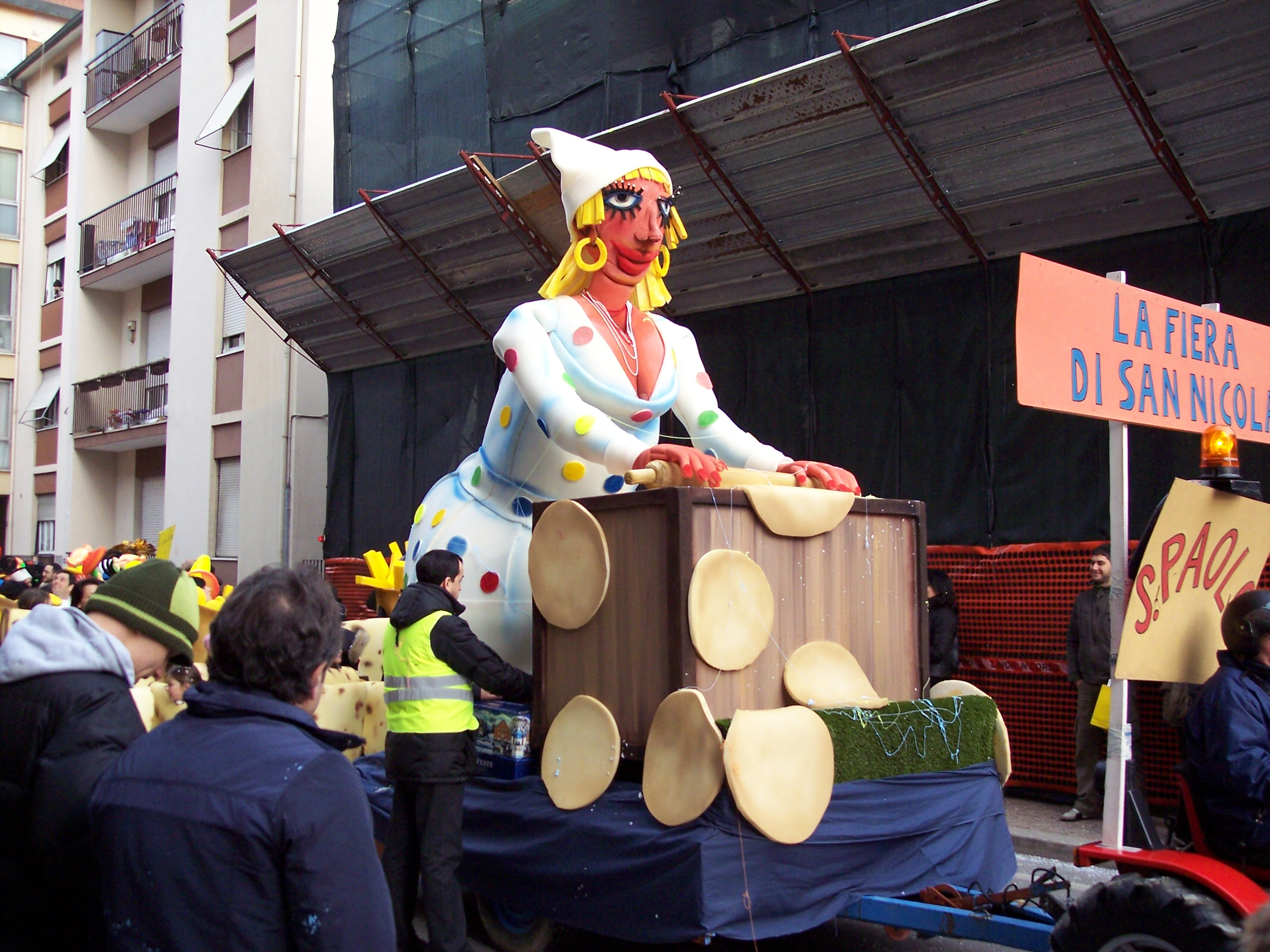

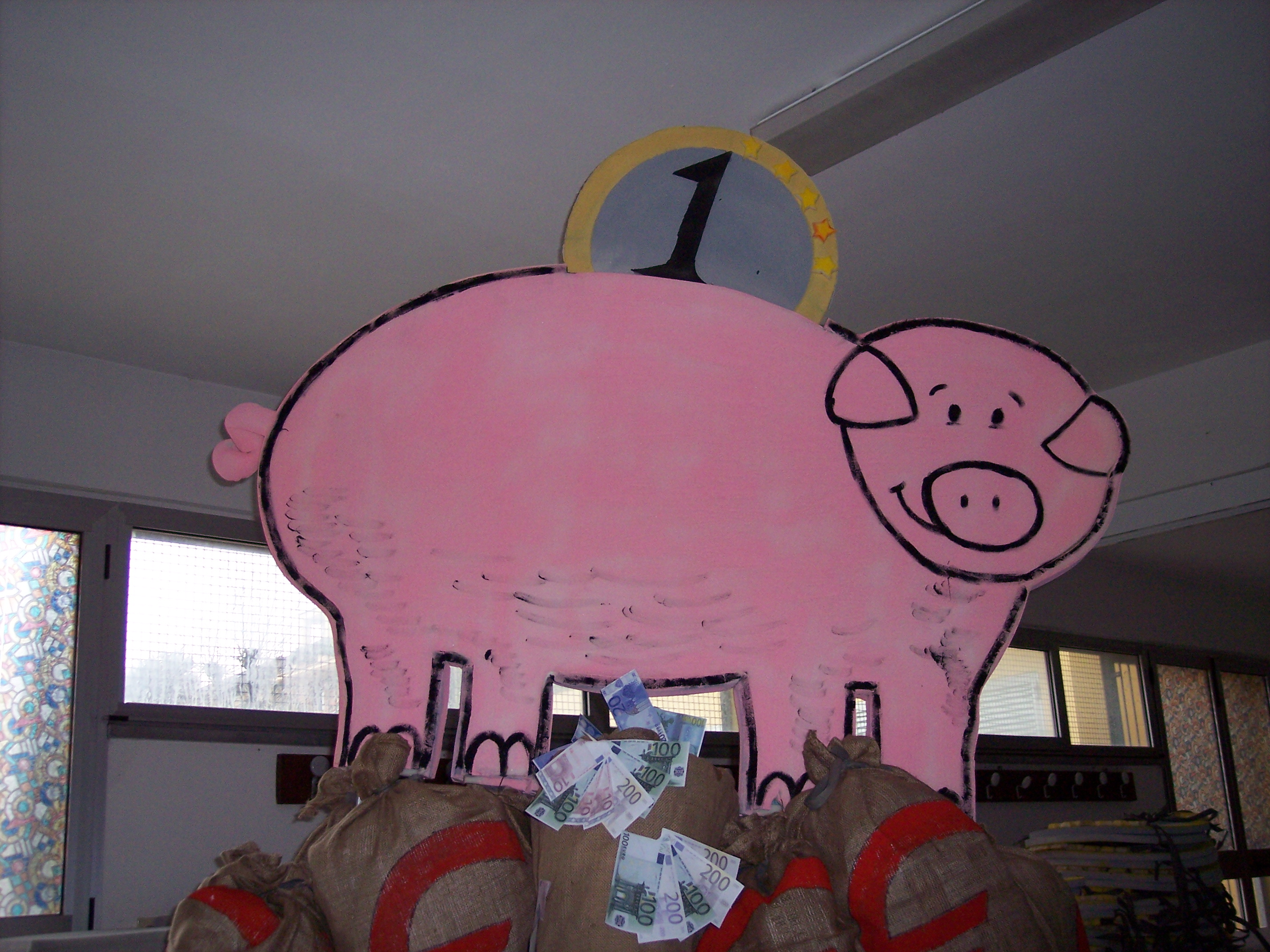

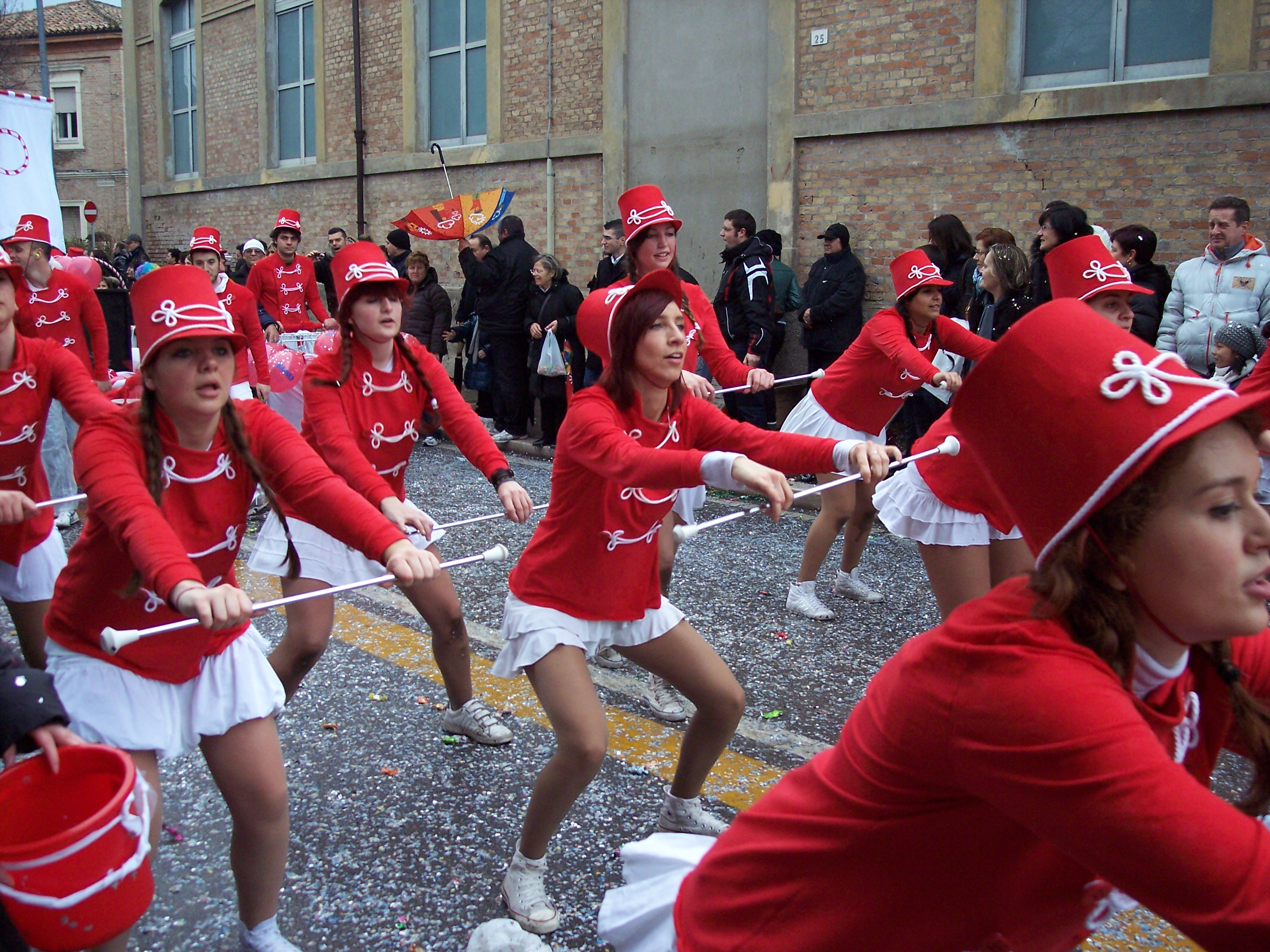

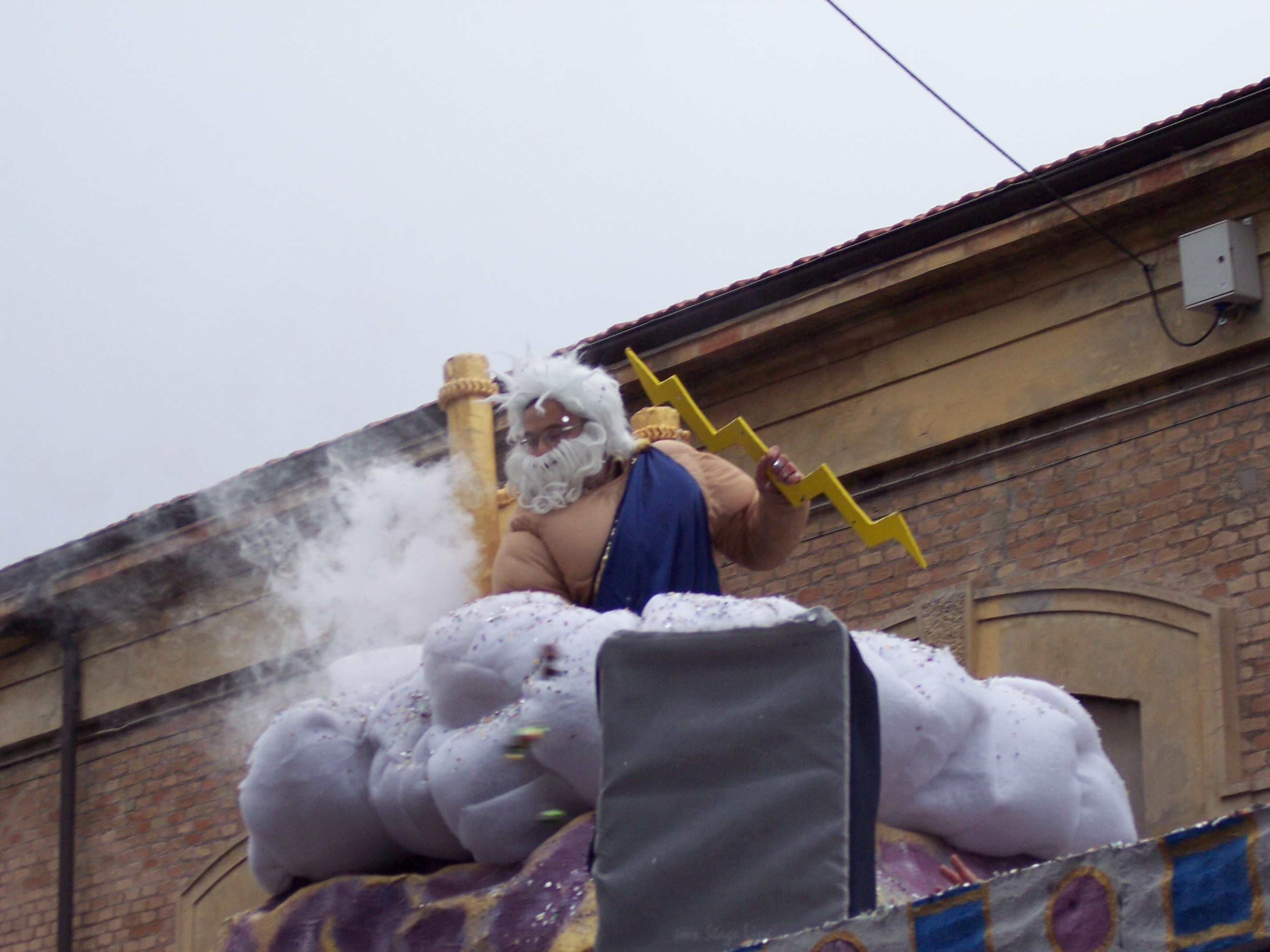
Carnival of Pesaro

The Pesaro film festival (Mostra Internazionale del Nuovo Cinema) has taken place in Pesaro since 1965.

The Rossini Opera Festival has taken place every summer since 1980 in Pesaro, home as well as the Conservatorio Statale di Musica "Gioachino Rossini" founded with a legacy from the composer.

== Sport ==
Pesaro hosts the home games of Victoria Libertas basketball; they play at the Adriatic Arena, the third biggest Italian indoor arena behind Mediolanum Forum in Milan and PalaLottomatica in Rome.

The city's other professional sports clubs are futsal club Pesaro Calcio a 5, volleyball club Volley Pesaro and football club Vis Pesaro dal 1898.

The city hosted the 2017 Rhythmic Gymnastics World Championships.

== Notable people ==
- Anna Maria Alberghetti (born 1936), singer and actress
- Massimo Ambrosini (born 1977), international association football player
- Pasquale Bini (1716–1770), violinist
- Antonello Bonci, neuroscientist
- Francesco Braschi (born 2004), racing driver
- Roberto Burioni (born 1962), physician and professor of microbiology and virology
- Bartolomeo Campi (died 1573), artist and military engineer
- Stefano Gabellini (born 1965), racing driver
- Lucia Gai (born 1991), international rugby union player
- Camilla Guerrieri (1628–after 1693), court painter
- Giovanni Francesco Guerrieri (1589–1655), painter
- Matilde Leonardi, neurologist and paediatrician
- Filippo Magnini (born 1982), swimmer
- Gianni Morbidelli (born 1968), Formula 1 driver
- Cristiano Mozzati, drummer for Lacuna Coil
- Luca Nardi (born 2003), professional tennis player
- Riz Ortolani (1926–2014), film composer
- Angelo Romani (1934–2003), Olympic swimmer
- Graziano Rossi (born 1954), motorcycle racer, father of Valentino Rossi
- Gioachino Antonio Rossini (1792–1868), composer
- Dorino Serafini (1909–2000), motorcycle racer and racing driver
- Giovanni Sforza (1466–1510), condottiero and first husband of Lucrezia Borgia
- Renata Tebaldi (1922–2004), operatic soprano
- Giuseppe Vaccai (1836–1912), painter
- Gaius Suetonius Paulinus (~40 AD), Roman General and Governor of Britain

== International relations ==
=== Twin towns – sister cities ===
Pesaro is twinned with:

- Nanterre, France
- Ljubljana, Slovenia
- Watford, United Kingdom
- Qinhuangdao, China
- Rafah, Palestine
- Keita, Niger
- Reșița, Romania
- Kakegawa, Japan

=== Partnership ===
- Rovinj, Croatia

== See also ==
- Pesaro railway station
- Alessandro Sforza
- Lucus Pisaurensis
- Votive Stones of Pesaro
- Costanzo Sforza
- Romagna
- Pesaro Angels
- Palazzo Baldassini, Pesaro
