= Lucus =

Latin name of a sacred forest

In ancient Roman religion, a lucus ([ˈɫ̪uː.kʊs], plural lucī) is a sacred grove.

A lucus was a cultivated place, more like a wooded park than a forest, and might contain an aedes, a building that housed the image of a god, or other landscaped features that facilitated or gave rise to ritual. It has been conjectured, for instance, that the Lupercal, referred to as a "cave", was a small lucus with an artificial grotto, since archaeology has uncovered no natural cave in the area.

== Etymology and definition ==
=== Terminology for sacred groves ===
Lucus was one of four Latin words meaning in general "forest, woodland, grove" (along with nemus, silva, and saltus), but unlike the others it was primarily used as a religious designation, meaning "sacred grove." Maurus Servius Honoratus, a late Roman grammarian, provides an explanation for the differences between these words, writing that a "lucus is a multitude of trees with religio, a nemus is an ordered multitude of trees," and a silva is "one which is extended and uncultivated." Isidore of Seville—a 6th-century scholar—defines the lucus as a "place enclosed by dense woods" ("locus densis arboribus septus") that blot out sunlight ("solo lucem detrahens"), and he claims that they were named for the lamps used there as part of religious ceremonies ("Potest et a conlucendo crebris luminibus dici, quae ibi propter religionem gentilium cultumque fiebant"). Evidence from Livy, a 1st-century BCE Roman historian, appears to corroborate this definition, for he describes the grove ("lucus") of Hera at Crotone as "enclosed by dense woods and tall fir trees" ("frequenti silva et proceris abietis arboribus saeptus"). The 1st-century BCE poet Ovid describes a lucus with the adjective sanctus, which is a term itself defined by the 5th-century CE author Macrobius as sometimes meaning "untainted" ("incorruptam"), perhaps implying that the lucus represents a grove undisturbed by human hand. Moreover, Ovid describes luci as the property of the divine, writing in his Metamorphoses that Nereus and the Nereids "possess" ("tenent") a sacred grove, which incidentally also reveals that ownership of a lucus could belong to multiple deities.

In the works of Ovid, the term silva appears to describe the broader forest region surrounding a lucus. For instance, Ovid recounts a story in which the goddess Diana returns from a day of hunting in a forest ("silva") and retires into her lucus, where she then invites Calliope and the forest nymphs to bathe together "in the forest" ("in silva"). Within this passage, the term silva denotes the surrounding woodlands where Diana had been hunting. Moreover, while detailing the kidnapping of Persephone, he describes the goddess Proserpina playing within a lucus, while the surrounding natural space is referred to as a silva. According to the classicist Sofia Bianchi Mancini, the silva could, at least in Ovid, serve as the defining threshold for a lucus. Mancini notes Ovid's version of the myth of Pentheus, wherein the legendary Theban king approaches an "open plain free from trees" ("purus ab arboribus ... campus") that is surrounded by trees ("cingentibus ... silvis"). Though not strictly defined as a lucus within the text, Mancini argues that the notion of such an area devoid of trees is essentially the etymological definition of a lucus—that being, a clearing. In any case, it is within this particular area that the sacred rites of Bacchus are conducted, and it is from the surrounding woodland that Pentheus witnesses this ceremony with "profane eyes," perhaps, in doing so—according to Mancini—effectively trespassing on the grove.

Statius, a 1st-century CE poet, utilizes the terms silva, nemus, and lucus to describe the same location. In his Thebaid, for instance, he describes a silva that is "enduring of time and bent by robust old age" ("capax aevi validaque incurva senecta"), but later in the same passage—after the goddess Diana is mentioned (who is known in the poem by the name Latonia)—the site is suddenly referred to as a nemus, and in the following lines, it is then later redesignated as a lucus. This exact same series of changing terminology (i.e. silva > nemus > lucus) reappears throughout the poem. In a later passage, he describes Adrastus and his companions walking through a forest ("silvas"), but then—upon seeing Hypsipyle and mistaking her for Diana—Adrastus addresses her as a "powerful goddess of the groves" ("diva potens nemorum"). Even later in the same section of the text, Hypsipyle, in exchange for her assistance in a war against Thebes, is promised an altar ("ara") that will "mark the sacred grove" ("lucus signabitur"). According to Mancini, it is the act of performing a religious ritual in these spaces that transforms them from a regular forest into a sacred grove. Hence, these sites are only denoted as nemora or luci after divine presence is noted: The first example only becomes a nemus after Diana is introduced to the site ("Latonia ... additur"), and the second example only becomes a lucus once the altar is promised to mark the site.

The same type of transition between a nemus and a lucus also occurred in reverse. Instead of following a progression from silva > nemus > lucus, the poet might instead present a regression of lucus > nemus > silva. The downgrade from a lucus to a silva may have resulted from some sort of perceived tainting of the grove after it had been violated. For instance, Ovid, in his version of the myth of Actaeon, describes the hunter first wandering through an "unfamiliar nemus" (nemus ignotum) before arriving in the sacred grove ("lucum") of Diana. However, after Actaeon trespasses on the site, it is suddenly referred to once more as a nemus: Ovid describes the nymphs surrounding Diana “filling the whole grove with sudden cries” (“subitisque ululatibus omne inplevere nemus”). In another story, this one by Statius, a lucus is slowly destroyed so as to allow the construction of a funeral pyre for the mythical character Opheltes and, as the site is ruined, it is demoted to a nemus and eventually silva. First, Statius proclaims that "miserable destruction" ("miserabile ... excidium") awaited the lucus, but then, after the beasts and birds flee in fright ("fugere ferae, nidosque tepentes absiliunt (metus urguet) aves"), and the "towering birch tree falls" ("cadit ardua fagus"), it is referred to as a nemus. Finally, after various other acts of desecration, the gods Pan and Silvanus abandon the site, while the "forest groans" ("aggemit ... silva").

=== Connection with lux ===
Quintilian, a 1st-century CE orator, mentions a theory that the word derived from the verb lūceō ("to be light") via enantiosemy, on account of the darkness of the grove, presumably because the foliage could block out light. This particular etymology was not produced by Quintilian, but taken from earlier Roman scholarship, perhaps specifically the writings of Aelius Stilo, a prominent philologist preceding Quintilian to whom several other enantiosemic etymologies are directly attributed. In any case, this explanation became somewhat well-known in antiquity, as it reappears throughout numerous other works. For instance, Servius cites the "lucus a non lucendo" ("lucus from not being light") etymology as an example of words that emerge from antiphrasis, and Isidore mentions this same etymology multiple times throughout his works. This etymology was not, however, necessarily highly regarded by even the ancient grammarians, with Quintilian including it amongst the "most hideous absurdities" ("foedissima ... ludibria"). The phrase lucus a non lucendo has even survived into modern English usage as a way of referring to illogical explanations.

Moder etymologists, however, do accept a connection between the terms lucus and lux ("light"). According to the Indo-European scholar Michiel de Vaan, the word derives from Proto-Italic *loukos, itself from Proto-Indo-European *lowkos ("light space"). On the basis of its Indo-European cognates, such as Sanskrit loká ("open space") and Old High German lōh ("forest, grove"), it is probable that the Latin word also originally meant "clearing." This original sense is perhaps reflected in the writings of the 2nd-century BCE author Cato the Elder, who describes the "thinning of a lucus" ("lucum conlucare"). According to the classicist Filippo Coarelli, this act of clearing the site is probably the process for the creation of a lucus, or a clearing. John Scheid, a scholar of Roman religion, argues that—by clearing the grove—the suppliants could once more permit light to shine on the area, thus allowing the space to fulfill its etymological purpose.

However, the classicist Alisa Hunt argues against "light-centric" interpretations of a lucus, noting that even the ancient Romans clearly felt as if the derivation from the lack of light ("a non lucendo") was tentative, and other ancient sources actually premise their etymological interpretation of the word on the presence of artificial light (e.g. candles). For instance, Isidore of Seville claims that they were named for the lamps used there as part of religious ceremonies ("Potest et a conlucendo crebris luminibus dici, quae ibi propter religionem gentilium cultumque fiebant"). However, Servius explicitly rejects this theory, directly stating that a lucus is not termed as such because there are artificial lights in the grove ("sint ibi lumina causa religionis"). Regardless, Isidore and Servius concur that luci were lit by artificial means, particularly utilizing lumina.

== Managing a grove ==
=== Expiatory rites ===
Prayer from Ovid

If I have fed my sheep on holy ground, or sat me down under a sacred tree, and
my sheep unwittingly have browsed on graves; if I have entered a
forbidden grove, or the nymphs and the half-goat god have been put to flight at
sight of me; if my pruning-knife has robbed a sacred copse of a shady
bough, to fill a basket with leaves for a sick sheep, pardon my fault.

— Translation by James G. Frazer

Ovid describes a prayer designed to expiate a shepherd in the event of having accidentally violated a sacred grove. The prayer lists numerous potential violations, appearing to try and cover a multitude of circumstances wherein the shepherd might have committed some religious crime, including the scenario that they might have cut off a branch of a tree in the grove. For a shepherd, the act of cutting off a branch or feeding it to their flock appears to have been relatively common, as Ovid himself elsewhere references the feeding of foliage to sheep ("quod pecori frondes . . . ministro"). Nevertheless, to have violated the grove in such a manner was evidently still a religious infringement that required some level of amendment. Given that, in this passage, the shepherd unintentionally wandered into the site, it implies that a lucus had an unclear boundary, as otherwise the shepherd would not have been so unsure regarding the exact limits of the grove. Moreover, even the need itself for a catch-all prayer covering every possible offense indicates that the Romans themselves were not always certain of the precise limits to sacred groves.

Prayer from Cato

Whether thou be god or goddess (si deus, si dea) to whom
this grove is dedicated, as it is thy right to receive a sacrifice of a
pig for the thinning of this sacred grove, and to this intent, whether I or
one at my bidding do it, may it be rightly done. To this end, in offering
this pig to thee I humbly beg that thou wilt be gracious and merciful to me,
to my house and household, and to my children. Wilt thou deign to
receive this pig which I offer thee to this end.

According to the Lex Luci Spoletina, an ancient law composed sometime after 241 BCE, it was forbidden to cut any of the sacred trees or remove anything from the grove, except on the day of one particular sacred festival. The law stipulates that anyone who does violate the grove must perform an expiatory sacrifice to Jupiter and also pay a fine. In his book On Agriculture, Cato records a Roman ritual lucum conlucare, "to clear a clearing". The officiant is instructed to offer a pig as a piaculum, a propitiation or expiatory offering made in advance of the potential wrong committed against the grove through human agency. Afterwards, Cato provides further instructions for an additional ritual, stating that "If you wish to till the ground, offer a second sacrifice in the same way, with the addition of the words: “for the sake of doing this work" ("operis faciundi causa"). Pliny the Elder references this same prayer, stating that—according to Cato—it was permissible to cut down sacred trees provided that a sacrificed had been performed prior. The word piaculum is repeated three times in the prayer, emphasizing that the sacrifice of the pig is not a freewill offering, but something owed to the deity by right (ius). The piaculum compensates the deity for a transgression or offense and differs from a regular sacrifice offered in the hope of procuring favor in return (do ut des).

The ritual described by Cato is similar to a practice documented in the epigraphic record for the Arval brotherhood, who would supposedly sacrifice "at the altar two expiatory pigs for pruning(?) the grove and performing work" ("ad aram immolavit porcas piaculares duas luci coinquendi et operis faciundi"). However, whereas Cato describes two separate sacrifices each of one pig, the Arval brotherhood appears to have combined both rites into one sacrifice of two pigs. Besides a pig, four separate texts out of the whole Acta Arvalia (inscriptions 13, 14, 17, 21) also mention that the sacrifice was performed with strues and fercta cakes (struibus ferctisque). The mention of such cake offerings in the Arval rite also parallels another ceremony described by Cato, wherein—prior to the harvest—a strues cake is dedicated to Janus and a ferctum cake to Jupiter. Festus also recounts an arboreal sacrifice involving strues and fercta cakes, stating that such food items were to be offered at trees that had been struck by lightning ("ad arbores fulguritas"). This reference to "lightning-struck trees" may provide an explanation for the offering of cakes in specifically inscriptions 14 and 17 of the Acta Arvalia, both of which describe trees that may have been damaged by lightning. In inscription 14, there is mention of trees that had been "thoroughly burnt" ("perusta[e"), perhaps on account of a lightning strike, while in inscription 17, the trees were in some affected by a storm.

The particular verb used to describe the arboricultural practice documented in the Acta Arvalia is coinquo, which is otherwise sparsely attested, though it is glossed by Festus as equivalent to coerceo ("to restrain, hold back"). The veracity of this statement from Festus is corroborated by Cato, who uses the term coercendi—an inflected form of coerceo—in a similar part of the prayer where the Arval brotherhood instead uses coinquo. Given that the ultimate purpose of Cato's prayer was to conlucare ("to thin, clear") a grove, a term itself glossed by Festus as referring to the clearing of an area so as to fill the space with light. Thus, it can be concluded that, in the Catonian text, the verb coerceō must have referred to some action that—when performed on trees—simultaneously 'restrained' the trees and cleared the area to make room for light. On this basis, Hunt suggests that the word most likely denoted some sort of pruning. Consequently, it can be assumed to that supposedly synonymous word coinquo also referred to the pruning or trimming of trees. However, the classicist Andrew Fox suggests that there are other possible interpretations of the word that still satisfy the aforementioned definitional criteria: It could have, for instance, referred to the act of trying branches back so as to force trees to grow in a specific manner. Festus, or at least the later editor Paul the Deacon, does equate a form coninquo with deputare ("to prune"), and Hunt interprets this particular form as a manuscript error for coinquo, though Fox argues that it is unclear why either Festus or Paul would have defined the same term twice.

==== Purpose ====
According to the classicist Nicole Belayche, the expiatory rite served to legitimize the act of clearing, thus protecting the suppliant from any potential violation of the sacred space. Given that the Arval brethren oversaw a sacred grove of Dea Dia, it might be assumed that their specific expiatory ritual was designed to exonerate them of any infringement on her sacred site. However, according to Hunt, the Acta Arvalia make no indication that the ceremony was motivated by any sense of wrongdoing committed against the sacred space. Dea Dia herself is hardly even mentioned in the proceedings, which only state that the ritual occurred at her grove. The Acta Arvalia themselves state that the piacular sacrifices were performed on account of the trees ("ob arborem or quod arbor"), which—in each case—had died either from old age ("vetustate") or stormy weather ("a tempestate"). In some cases, the text is further modified by the phrase vel vi maiori ("or by a greater force"), as in "vetustate vel vi maiori" and "tempestate vel vi maiori," meaning "by old age or a greater force" and "by a storm or a greater force" respectively. The mention of this vague "greater force" indicates both that the Arvals acknowledged potential divine influence and also that they possessed limited knowledge of its nature. Unusually, no recipient for the Arvalian piacula is specified, which appears to contradict the general scholarly understanding of Roman sacrificial rite as a form of interaction with the divine. However, the Acta Arvalia probably were not intended to thoroughly record each individual step of the ceremony, leaving open the possibility that some deity—perhaps Dea Dia—was named as the beneficiary of the sacrifice. In any case, the omission of any recipient deity's name, even if they did exist, still showcases that the emphasis of these rituals was not on any particular god, but on the trees themselves.

For the Romans, the destruction of a tree by such forces, may have served as a type of omen. Pliny the Elder, for instance, states that "among the illnesses of trees there is also space for portents" ("Inter vitia arborum est et prodigiis locus"). Additionally, Cassius Dio includes specifically the uprooting of trees during a storm as an example of how the divine ("τὸ δαιμόνιον," "tò daimónion") would reveal itself to those capable of interpreting the signs. One particular Arval ritual hints at a portentous significance assigned to the trees: The burning of a tree that had fallen over from old age either for or at a sacrifice ("ad sacrificium"), for the ancient Romans considered burning to be an acceptable treatment of ominous entities. For instance, Livy describes an incident wherein two domestic oxen climbed to the roof of a building and were subsequently ordered by the haruspices to be burned. This particular Arval ritual is only explicitly described as sacrificium, though Hunt argues that it may have also performed an expiatory role, with the act of incinerating the tree simultaneously serving as a sacrifice and fulfilling the requirements for an expiation.

There are numerous other examples of prophetic trees from Roman literature. Pliny, for example, notes the existence of certain specific portentous trees, such as the Ficus Ruminalis, a fig-tree in Rome that was supposedly worshipped as sacred because "things struck by lightning are buried there" ("sacra fulguribus ibi conditis"). According to Pliny, when the tree withered away ("arescit") and was then "by the care of the priests" replanted ("cura sacerdotum seritur"), it was a sign of future events ("praesagio"). Ovid mentions a lucus on the Quirinal Hill that shades the "temple of the king of Rome" ("templum Romani regis obumbrat"), perhaps referring to the shrine of Quirinus on the Quirinal Hill, where Pliny describes two sacred myrtles characterized by a "a prophetic and remarkable augury" ("fatidico quidem et memorabili augurio"). Pliny records that the two myrtles were planted in front of the temple, one of which was associated with the patricians and the other with the plebeians. Supposedly, for much of early Roman history, while the Senate flourished ("floruit"), the patrician myrtle remained strong and fruitful ("praevaluit exuberans ac laeta"), whereas the plebeian tree was wrinkled and squalid ("retorrida ac squalida"). However, eventually the plebeian tree grew stronger and the patrician myrtle grew yellow ("flavescente patricia"), and afterwards—following the Social War—the influence of the Senate diminished while the power of the plebeians increased.

The Arvals were not exclusively concerned with the deaths of the trees, for they also performed sacrifices when attempting to remove a tree whose growth impacted the temple of Dea Dia. Such an event occurred in 183 CE, when a fig tree grew into the roof of the sanctuary, prompting the Arvals to remove the branch and perform a series of different sacrifices. The first ritual consisted of a suovetaurilia maiora, a type of sacrifice involving a pig, sheep, and a bull. Afterwards, the Arvals performed another sacrifice in front of Dea Dia's temple, this one dedicated to Mater Larum or Juno Deae Diae. Then, a sacrifice of two sheep was performed for three minor deities: Adolenda ("Needing to be burned"), Commolenda ("Need to be chopped up"), and Deferunda ("Needing to be taken down"). The fourth and final sacrifice was performed in front of the Caesareum and dedicated to the deified emperors. The Arvals were not alone in their concern for such incidents: Pliny the Elder recounts a story wherein a fig tree had broached a statue of Silvanus, prompting the Vestal Virgins to offer a sacrifice and then to remove the branch.

The act of removing such branches evidently also incurred some risk that the procedure may be performed improperly, eliciting divine retaliation. Pliny the Elder records that, contemporaneously with the part of the Cimbrian War—during which time the Roman suffered a series of defeats—an elm branch was removed in the lucus of Juno at Nocera. According to Fox, it is likely that—in this particular scenario—the pruning was not intentionally harmful, but presumably the rites had not been obeyed and thus the act constituted a religious crime. Pliny describes the deed with violent language, stating that the branch had been amputated ("amputatum erat"), perhaps indicating a more violent removal rather than a meticulous pruning. In any case, according to Pliny, the branch miraculously grew back of "its own volition" ("sponte") and even flowered, and afterwards Rome suddenly saw great victories in the war. In any case, it is perhaps on account of this risk that the Arvals placed such emphasis on the removal process in their sacrifice, with even the three deities of Adolenda, Commolenda, and Deferunda all pertaining to aspect of cutting down and burning a tree. However, according to Hunt, this model of sacrifices originally intended for the event of arboreal overgrowth eventually came to influence the ceremonies performed on account of dead or dying trees, which—in the earlier inscriptions—had elicited sacrifices ob arborem or quod arbor. For instance, in later Arval inscriptions—specifically inscriptions 25 and 27—sacrifices performed in response to tree death were dedicated to Adolenda and Coinquenda ("Needing to be pruned"), a duo of deities reminiscent of the aforementioned Adolenda, Commolenda, and Deferunda. According to Hunt, the act of deifying these individual aspects of the process of human interference with trees demonstrates that—to the Arvals—every aspect of that process was religiously significant.

===== Relation to arboriculture =====
It is tempting, but misleading, to read ecological principles into ritualized agriculture; for the early Romans, respect was the partner of fear in their regard for the divine forces in nature, and the open invocation with which this prayer begins is a contractual "out" or hedge. (Note: Thoreau nonetheless made admiring reference to Cato's prayer in Walden: "I would that our farmers when they cut down a forest felt some of that awe which old Romans did when they came to thin, or let in the light to, a consecrated grove (lucum conlucare).) In fact, Hunt argues that the pruning of the grove of Dea Dia was likely harmful to the trees. The Arval brotherhood conducted this ritual annually, and yearly trimmings are often detrimental to mature trees. Such arboricultural information was certainly known to the Romans, as Pliny the Elder writes that "a trimming is beneficial for trees, but to slaughter them every year is most injurious" ("interlucatio arboribus prodest, sed omnium annorum trucidatio inutilissima"). Moreover, the ceremony was always conducted in May, which—according to modern arboreal science—is a terrible time for pruning trees. The Romans also held reservations regarding the trimming of trees during this time, with the 1st-century author Columella writing that in "regions that are sunny, where winters are mild, the best and most natural pruning is that of autumn."

The Arvals rarely performed any type of maintenance for the trees besides the annual trimmings—which likely actually harmed the trees—and also the aforementioned piacular sacrifices, which only occurred in the event that a tree was afflicted by old age or storms, both of which were special emergency scenarios. One Arval inscription does describe both the pruning of the grove ("luci sublucandi") and also trees "needing to be bound and others needing to be replaced" ("arborum oblaqueand(arum) et aliar(um) restituendarum"), perhaps because—following a storm—some trees needed extra support in order to survive, whereas others were already too damaged and needed to be replaced. Unusually, in this text, the rituals of the pruning and the more basic grove maintenance appear to be combined. Whereas this particular inscription seems to detail a ritual that is somewhat more sensitive to the health of the trees, the Arvals overall largely neglected protecting arboreal welfare. In fact, according to Hunt, the act of replacing dead or damaged trees showcases that the Arvals did not attribute some special sacred significance to arboreal matter.

Hunt argues that—in some rituals—the Arvals appear to have concerned themselves far more with tree death than with preserving tree life, as demonstrated by the particular usage of the prepositions ob or quod (both meaning "because"), which explicitly portray the dead trees as the impetus for the sacrifices. This emphasis on tree death is still likely not a matter of genuine concern for arboreal health, since the Arvals were perfectly willing to cut down and destroy damaged or dying trees. In one instance, the Arvals note the existence of trees that have been "badly burnt by storms" ("tempestatibus perusta[e") and determine that they are to be felled at some point in the future ("caedendae"). Likewise, in inscription 25, the Arvals describe a series of sacrifices for trees that have been damaged by a storm, stating that these trees are "eruendar(um), ferr(o) [f]endendar(um), adolendar(um), commolendar(um)" ("needing to be dug up, needing to be split (?) with iron, needing to be burned, needing to be chopped up"). Moreover, arboreal matter was shown little respect in the aforementioned ritual of burning a tree that had fallen over on account of old age. Furthermore, Hunt suggests that the Arvals may not have cared to properly document all of the tree deaths within the grove, arguing that—in the 226-year period which the which the inscriptions span—a greater number of deaths than are recorded would be expected to have occurred. Though, it is unclear exactly what species of tree were present in the grove of Dea Dia, preventing a more precise estimate of the number of tree deaths that would be expected. In any case, Hunt proposes that the Arvals' concerns for any potential divine message expressed through tree death perhaps waxed and waned in accordance with political turmoil, noting that four of the eighteen recorded "arboreal crises" occurred during the reign of Emperor Domitian (r. 81 – 96 CE).

=== Violations of the grove ===
The Romans evidently viewed violations of the sacred grove as religious offenses. Festus, a 2nd-century Roman grammarian, mentions a "pre-eminent grove" ("lucus capitalis") that, if violated ("si quid violatum est"), would be "cleansed by the head of the violator" ("caput violatoris expiatur"), perhaps referring to beheading. Furthermore, Valerius Maximus, a 1st-century BCE Roman rhetorician, records the supposed divine wrath of Asclepius directed towards Decimus Turullius, a prefect of Marc Antony who supposedly cut down the trees in a sacred grove dedicated to the god. According to Maximus, upon Marc Antony's defeat in the Battle of Actium, Turullius was condemned to death by Augustus, and—due to the divine machinations of Ascelpius—his execution happened to occur in the same grove which he had previously violated. Many of the details of this story are probably of the result of Valerius employing poetic license, and it is likely that this account is not fully accurate. There is another story recounting a similar series of events, this one authored by the 2nd-century historian Cassius Dio, though—in this version—Turullius has the personal name Publius. The accounts of Dio and Maximus differ slightly in regard to their portrayal of the sacrilege and the subsequent punishment. Dio states that, because Turullius had previously felled trees at the grove of Asclepius in Cos and was executed on the same island, it "was thought" that Augustus was "making amends to the god." This telling of the event seems to imply a degree of malleability to the nature of the religious offense—Turullius was not immediately punished for his actions, but, after the defeat at Actium, his felling of the trees was retroactively recast as the just reciprocation for prior crimes. In contrast, Maximus's rendition of the story seems to imply that the divine retribution was inevitable, for Maximus states that Ascelpius—so as to inflict the requisite punishment—had influenced the course of history in order to move Turullius towards his later demise.

The Romans did not necessarily respect all sacred groves: Plutarch, a 1st-century CE Greek historian, writes that Sulla—during his siege of Athens—destroyed the sacred groves ("ἱεροῖς ἄλσεσι," "hieroîs álsesi") present in the Lyceum and the Academy, in spite of the cultural importance to the Athenians. Aelian, a 2nd-century Roman author, explicitly mocks the ancient Athenians for their zealous protection of certain sacred trees, stating "How great was the superstition of the Athenians! If somebody cut down a little oak from a hero’s shrine, they killed him." Moreover, Tacitus, a 1st-century CE historian, describes a Roman army, at the behest of its commander Suetonius Paullinus, destroying sacred groves to "savage cults" ("luci saevis superstitionibus sacri") in Roman Britain, supposedly because "they [the Britons] considered it a pious duty to slake the altars with captive blood and to consult their deities by means of human entrails." Tacitus does not explicitly address the potential of divine punishment for the Roman troops, though he immediately follows the account of the destruction of the groves with the foreboding words: "While he [Suetonius] was thus occupied, the sudden revolt of the province was announced to Suetonius."

==== In literature ====
The 1st-century BCE poet Lucan recounts a tale wherein Julius Caesar destroys a sacred grove outside the city of Massalia when it had sided with his enemy Domitius Ahenobarbus during the civil war. This story is most likely a fabrication, though the tale is perhaps tangentially based on a real historical event—that being the then recent destruction of a sacred grove at Mona, an island in Britain, during the campaigns of Suetonius Paullinus. In any case, Lucan describes the grove as "untouched by men’s hands from ancient times" ("lucus erat longo numquam violatus ab aevo"), which parallels similar languages utilized by Ovid to describe other sacred groves. Ovid, for instance, describes the ancient grove of Cadmus ("silva vetus") as having never been "violated by an axe" ("nulla violata securi"), and he writes that an "ancient wood" ("silva vetus") sacred to the god Maenalus had also been "long unprofaned by the axe" ("nullaque diu violata securi"). Furthermore, Ovid—whilst recounting the story of Erysichthon—states that the Thessalian king had once violated grove of Ceres ("Cereale nemus") with an axe ("violasse securi") and to have "profaned the ancient sacred groves with iron ("lucos ferro temerasse vetustos").

Lucan states that Caesar's soldiers felt trepidation at the thought of violating a sacred place, writing that they were moved by the "solemnity and terror of the place" ("motique verenda maiestate loci") and believed that "that, if they aimed a blow at the sacred trunks ("robora sacra"), their axes would rebound against their own limbs." Regardless, within the poem, Caesar himself chooses to grab an axe and strike a tree, declaring "Believe that I am guilty of sacrilege, and thenceforth none of you need fear to cut down the trees.” Lucan further writes that, afterwards, "all the men obeyed his bidding." though they were still "not easy in their minds" as "they had weighed Caesar’s wrath against the wrath of heaven." Nevertheless, according to the classicist Antony Augoustakis, Caesar's actions were perhaps not to be interpreted as a religious crime. as the grove is itself not necessarily described as ideal: It is portrayed as horrifying and said to lack divine presence. Alternatively, the classicist Charles Sayor argues that the violation of the grove is instead to be construed as an evil act, akin to "a cut in the cosmos extending through the worlds of man, nature and the gods." Furthermore, according to the philologist O. C. Phillips, this whole story serves to characterize Caesar in a negative light: It evokes other stories from Graeco-Roman culture, namely the aforementioned myth of Erysichthon, and confers those connotations onto Caesar.

The classicist Matthew Leigh argues that the darkness of this grove is notably self-perpetuating: The grove is, according to Lucan, "a space of darkness and cold shade, and banished the sunlight far above." As long as the grove remains uncut, the trees shall continue to blot out sunlight, thus reinforcing the terrifying aura of the locale. Leigh proposes that, by cutting down the trees, Caesar permitted light to once more penetrate through the foliage, consequently removing the fear-inducing power of the locale. According to Leigh, this passage from Lucan thematically parallels a separate story from the 1st-century BCE poet Lucretius, who writes that the philosopher Epicurus "was the first that dared to uplift mortal eyes" against "the weight of superstition," and that neither fables of the gods could quell him, nor thunderbolts, nor heaven with menacing roar." Ultimately, Lucretius concludes that Epicurus was the "first of all men to shatter the confining bars of nature’s gates." Both Caesar and Epicurus defy superstition, going against the will of the gods, and they are ultimately not met with any divine retribution, instead only revealing the fallacies underlying the old beliefs.

Moreover, Lucan's story may show some similarities with a section of the Aeneid where the hero Aeneas oversees the desolation of anolive tree ("oleaster") sacred to Faunus. In another work of Virgil, his Georgics, the oleaster tree is representative of untamed wilderness in opposition to civilization, and consequently its destruction in the Aeneid at the behest of the Trojans is perhaps symbolic of their efforts to establish a new civilization in Italy. Both in Virgil and in Lucan, the sacred trees are leveled out of military necessity, with the Trojans in the Aeneid specifically seeking to fight on even ground ("puro ut possent concurrere campo"). Furthermore, both authors describe the felling of the trees with the verb procumbunt ("they fall down"), and both proceed to list a series of five separate trees as a part of a three-line passage—those being, in Virgil, pitch pines ("piceae"), holm oak ("ilex"), ashen logs ("fraxineaeque trabes"), "splitable" oak ("fissile robur"), and large mountain ash trees ("ingentis ... ornos"), and, in Lucan, mountain ash trees ("orni"), gnarled holm oaks ("nodosa ... ilex"), Dodona's woods ("Silvaque Dodones"), alder ("alnus"), and cypress ("cupressus"). The classicist Florian Barrière argues that the particular choice of tree in Lucan is probably itself a subversion of the stock idealized natural landscape in poetry. For instance, ash and holm oak trees were used in Virgil's Georgics to build boats and in his Aeneid as part of military construction, and are therefore—according to Barrière—not particularly "bucolic." Moreover, yew trees ("taxos"), which Lucan mentions in a separate passage, and cypress trees both appear elsewhere as funerary trees.

The question of a potential heavenly response is explicitly evoked in the poem from Lucan: He claims that, upon witnessing the destruction of the grove, the Gauls bewailed, but the besieged Massalians rejoiced, for they believed that Caesar's actions would incur the ire of the gods. Lucan himself dismisses upon the hopes of the Massalians, writing that "But Fortune often guards the guilty, and the gods must reserve their wrath for the unlucky." The destruction an oak-tree ("quercum") is perhaps even symbolic of Caesar's inevitable victory in the civil war over Pompey, who—earlier in the poem—is compared to a tree ("quercus"). Alternatively, Augoustakis argues that Lucan had implicitly implored the reader to consider Caesar's own eventual assassination, just as the aforementioned Turullius was later executed after having violated a sacred grove. However, Philips argues that—within the time frame of Lucan's epic—Caesar is faced with no divine recompense, and he is in fact rewarded at times with exceptional fortune. For instance, Lucan writes, regarding the clearing of a flood in Spain for Caesar's army, that "Fortune, contented with having frightened her favorite a little, came back in full force; and the gods earned pardon by an exceptional exercise of their support." In this respect, that being the lack of divine retribution, Lucan parallels Virgil, for in the Aeneid, Aeneas escapes punishment for his violation of the grove of Faunus. Virgil, like Lucan, initially appears to set up the potential of divine punishment: Just as the Massalians rejoice that Caesar's actions shall surely earn him heavenly wrath, Turnus—an enemy of Aeneas—prays to Faunus, proclaiming that whereas he has honored the rites of the god, Aeneas has defiled them (""colui vestros si semper honores, quos contra Aeneadae bello fecere profanos""). Nevertheless, both Aeneas and Caesar are ultimately victorious, with Aeneas later slaying Turnus.

=== Profits from grove ===
Various ancient authors imply that profits could be extracted from groves. Plutarch, a 1st-century CE Greek author, in his Roman Questions, asks "Why do they call the money expended upon public spectacles lucar? Is it because round about the city there are, consecrated to gods, many groves which they call luci, and they used to spend the revenue from these on the public spectacle?" In this passage, Plutarch is etymologizing the term lucar ("forest tax for the support of players"), which is also defined by Festus as "money extracted from groves" ("lucar appellatur aes quod ex lucis captatur"). The etymology probably derives from the now-lost work by Verrius Flaccus, whom both Plutarch and Festus utilized as a source. In any case, it is not clear how accurate this explanation actually is; it is entirely possible that this theory is completely spurious. At the very least, the practice of collecting wealth from groves did not occur in Plutarch's time, as he explicitly frames the act in the past tense (""ἀνήλισκον," "anḗliskon;" "they used to spend"). If the Romans did indeed have some means by which they could extract money from groves, it is unclear why they would spend this wealth on public entertainment, as otherwise excess funds reared from sacred sites was only ever allocated towards the religious spaces themselves, either for their upkeep or for any activities. To resolve this issue, Theodor Mommsen proposed that the games in question were originally only the sacerdotal games.

One extremely corrupt passage from the Satires of Lucillius refers to a "luporum exauctorem malvanum," which is often emended to "lucorum exactorem Albanum" ("exactor of the Alban groves"). If this correction is accepted, then the passage would presumably describe some sort of publican exactor who operated at the Alban groves, though the exact nature of their job is uncertain. The classicist John Bodel proposes that they may have served as a sort of tax collector, perhaps enforcing a fine imposed on all who entered the grove; or they may have had nothing to do with gathering funds and instead merely managed the upkeep of the grove. Another piece of evidence for a connection between groves and finances derives from the treasury at the grove of Venus Libitina. Dionysius of Halicarnassus, a 1st-century BCE Roman historian, records that another 2nd-century BCE author named Lucius Calpurnius Piso stated that the legendary Roman king Servius Tullius instituted a series of policies designed to keep track of the population of the city, one of which stipulated that, for all deaths, the family members had to pay a coin to the treasury at the grove ("ἄλσει," "álsei") of Venus Libitina.

Archaeological excavations at Puteoli unearthed an ancient law, the Lex libitinaria Puteolana, which outlined rules for the funerary trade at the local Lucus Libitinae ("grove of Libitina"). According to the law, residents of the town were prohibited from leaving a corpse unburied and were required to exclusively contract with the manceps ("contractor, agent") associated with the grove for burial. These rules would have essentially granted the grove's manceps a monopoly on burial, naturally also allowing the grove to produce large quantities of wealth for the state. However, the law only confirms the existence of such a system for Puteoli and no other location, though given that many Roman colonies—including Puteoli—heavily modeled their local administration after that of the city of Rome, it is possible that this particular type of funerary policy was also borrowed from the capital, albeit perhaps with some regional variation.

== Emotional reaction to groves ==
Ovid describes two separate groves that—upon viewing—one would be compelled to accept that a numen resided within the place. In his Amores, Ovid mentions an "ancient grove" ("vetus ... lucus") made "extremely gloomy with its dense trees" ("densa praenubilus arbore"), upon viewing which "you would agree a numen dwelt within the place" ("concedas numen inesse loco"). Moreover, in his Fasti, Ovid describes a lucus under the Aventine Hill made "black by the shade of holm-oaks" ("niger ilicis umbra"), at the sight of which one would be able to say that a numen resided within ("quo posses viso dicere “numen inest.”"). Pliny the Elder similarly refers to sacred groves as the dwellings of deities, stating "nor do we pay greater worship to images shining with gold and ivory than to the forests ("lucos") and to the very silences that they contain." Another author, the 1st-century CE geographer Pomponius Mela describes the woodlands of Gaul as "pleasant" ("amoenus") with their "vast groves" ("lucis inmanibus").

Seneca the Younger, a 1st-century CE Stoic philosopher, describes a grove with "ancient trees" ("vetustis arboribus") that have "grown to an unusual height" ("solitam altitudinem egressis") and are "shutting out a view of the sky by a veil of pleached and intertwining branches" ("et conspectum caeli ramorum aliorum alios protegentium summovens obtentu"). These characteristics are perhaps framed by Seneca in a positive light: He purports that "the loftiness of the forest, the seclusion of the spot," and one's "marvel at the thick unbroken shade in the midst of the open spaces" will prove to them "the presence of numen" ("illa proceritas silvae et secretum loci et admiratio umbrae in aperto tam densae atque continuae fidem tibi numinis faciet"). Moreover, Seneca states that the onlooker's "soul will be moved by a certain imitation of religio" ("animum tuum quadam religionis suspicione percutiet"). According to the classicist Antti Lampinen, Seneca's account presents a positive ekphrasis, and is to be understood as expressing admiration for the grove and its qualities. However, according to the classicist Joanna Pypłacz, the particular "imitation of religio" ("religionis suspicione") is comparable to the feeling of the sublime described by Edmund Burke as a "passion similar to terror."

In other writings, these characteristics are more explicitly recast as more horrifying and dreadful. For example, Statius describes a sacred grove of Diana where "no suns can penetrate" through the woods and "an empty terror keeps the silence and a semblance of the light shut out makes an eerie pallor." Moreover, in Lucan's account, the grove is explicitly described as devoid of traditional divine presence: He writes that "No rural Pan dwelt there, no Silvanus, ruler of the woods, no Nymphs." Instead, the gods present in this grove are barbaric and dreadful, they have wooden statues the "mere antiquity and the ghastly hue" of which "struck terror" into the hearts of the Roman soldiers. Even the natural world dares to tread upon the site: Lucan purports that "birds feared to perch," "wild beasts would not lie down." Unlike Lucan's grove, Statius emphasizes the divine presence in this locale: He directly states, "nor does the shade lack its deity," and explicitly describes Diana as an "inhabitant" of the site ("nemori Latonia cultrix additur").

Ovid, in contrast, does not describe the ominous feeling evoked by a sacred grove, but instead begins by highlighting its natural beauty. However, the pleasant visage of this grove is artificial and deceptive, with Ovid writing that, though not "wrought by any artist's hand" ("arte laboratum nulla"), the site had imitated art by its "own cunning" ("simulaverat artem ingenio natura suo"). Ultimately, the grove proves treacherous, for it is the "sparkling spring" ("fons ... perlucidus") that transforms Actaeon into a stag, resulting in his death at the hands of his own hunting dogs. Ovid otherwise made frequent use of the ironic conflict between terrible events and pleasant natural scenery, so much so that according to the classicist Charles Segal, nature—in Ovid's works—becomes "a kind of trap, suddenly and unexpectedly sprung, which reveals the insecurity and danger surrounding the dwellers in such a world." Propertius, a 1st-century BCE elegiac poet—in his telling of the death of Tarpeia—similarly establishes a contrast between the tragic events occurring within the grove and its physical beauty. He opens the tale by proclaiming that his subject shall be the "crime of Tarpeia" ("Tarpeium scelus") and her "shameful grave" ("Tarpeiae turpe sepulcrum"), immediately establishing a dour tone. Yet, he almost immediately proceeds to describe "fruitful" grove (Lucus erat felix) and the "bowered home of Silvanus" ("Silvani ramosa domus"), whose "sweet pipe" compels sheep to "come from the heat to drink" ("quo dulcis ab aestu fistula poturas ire iubebat oves").

== Worship at groves ==
The Lucaria ("Grove Festival") was held on July 19 and 21, according to the Fasti Amiterni, a calendar dating from the reign of Tiberius found at Amiternum (now S. Vittorino) in Sabine territory. Julius Frontinus, a 1st-century CE Roman engineer, recounts his own personal visit to "sacred groves" ("lucos sacros") and "sacred trees" ("arbores sacratas"), where he supplicated the gods. Frontinus justifies his particular choice of locale for worship, stating that he "was living the rural life" ("rure agebam"), implying that these sacred trees were viewed as a largely extra-urban phenomenon and therefore an at least atypical religious rite for city-dwelling folk. Apuleius records that "when pious travelers happen to pass by a sacred grove (lucus) or a cult place on their way, they are used to make a vow (votum), or a fruit offering, or to sit down for a while." Servius says that a lucus is so called because non luceat, "it is not illuminated", perhaps implying that a proper sacred grove hosted only legitimate daytime ceremonies and not dubious nocturnal rites that required torchlight.

== Sacred groves of the Roman Empire ==
A lucus might become such a focus of activity that a community grew up around it, as was the case with the Lucus Augusti that is now Lugo in Spain and the Lucus Feroniae near Capena. Lucus is therefore part of the Latin name of several different ancient places in the Roman Empire from which the modern name derives, including:

- Lucus Angitiae ("Sacred Grove of Angitia"), now Luco dei Marsi, a town in Italy
- Lucus Pisaurensis, the Sacred Grove of Pesaro, Italy; discovered by Annibale degli Abati Olivieri, an 18th-century Italian aristocrat
- Lucus Augusti, the name of multiple sites, such as:
  - Lugo, the city in Spain
  - Luc-en-Diois, in France
- Lucus Feroniae ("Sacred Grove of Feronia") or Feronia, a now-disappeared city in Etruria, Italy; see Torre di Terracina, Italy

== See also ==
- Fanum
- Lucina (goddess)
- Nemeton
