= Biblioteca Oliveriana =

Public library in Pesaro, Italy

- Biblioteca Oliveriana
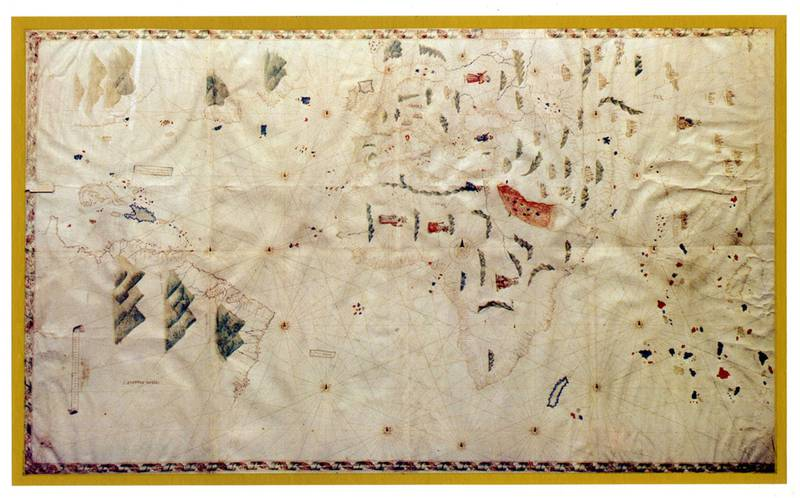
- Pesaro Planisphere (map from 1504-1508 with new world)
- 43.9098°N 12.9097°E
- Location: Pesaro, Italy
- Established: 1756

Collection
- Size: 405,252 item (2020), 428,452 item (2022), 150,000 item (2022), 246,405 volume, 355 item, 400,000 item (2019), 400,000 item (2021)

Other information
- Website: https://oliveriana.pu.it/?id=14525

The Biblioteca Oliveriana is a public library located in the Palazzo Almerici on via Mazza in the town of Pesaro, region of Marche, Italy. It shares the building with the Museo Oliveriano, an archaeology museum with which it shares a common history.

== History ==
The idea of a public museum for these artifacts came from the scholar Giovanni Battista Passeri (1694-1780). In 1756, Annibale degli Abati Olivieri (1708–1789), an aristocrat without heirs, donated his collection of antiquities, including medals and ancient coins, and his book collection to the city, to form the nucleus of the present Oliveriana Library. In 1787, the collection was enhanced by the collections of Giovanni Battista Passeri (1694–1780).

The library and the museum had their first accommodation in Piazzetta San Giacomo (today Piazza Olivieri) on the ground floor of the eighteenth-century Palazzo Olivieri, designed by the architect and painter Giovanni Andrea Lazzarini; the library was inaugurated on May 2, 1793.

In 1885 (or July 31, 1892), the various collections in possession of the city were brought to the present site.

== Library ==
The three reading rooms are respectively called Olivieri, Passeri, and Perticari. The first houses the white Carrara marble bust of Olivieri, sculpted by Sebastian Pantanelli in 1791–92; the second houses a portrait of the archaeologist Passeri; and the third houses part of the library of the illustrious scholar and linguist Giulio Perticari (1779–1822).

In his will, Olivieri stated:

Where reigns idleness and ignorance there can be no morality. May it therefore be that the income you will derive from my goods will serve to make my fellow citizens cultivated and industrious.

Furthermore, he wished that the foundation lead to the provision in Pesaro of "Masters of Science, chosen in accordance to the times and agreeable to the needs, the abilities, and inclinations of citizens ... without giving these chairs to a specific religious community" and that the directors "consider specially the study of Law and Medicine ... and promote the study of painting, sculpture and architecture" and "introduce into Pesaro any new art".

The library contains over 400 incunabula, including the Hypnerotomachia Poliphili printed by Aldus Manutius in 1499 in Venice and the Varia carmina by Sebastian Brant printed by Johann Bergmann in 1498 in Basel. A full catalogue is available.

== Museum ==
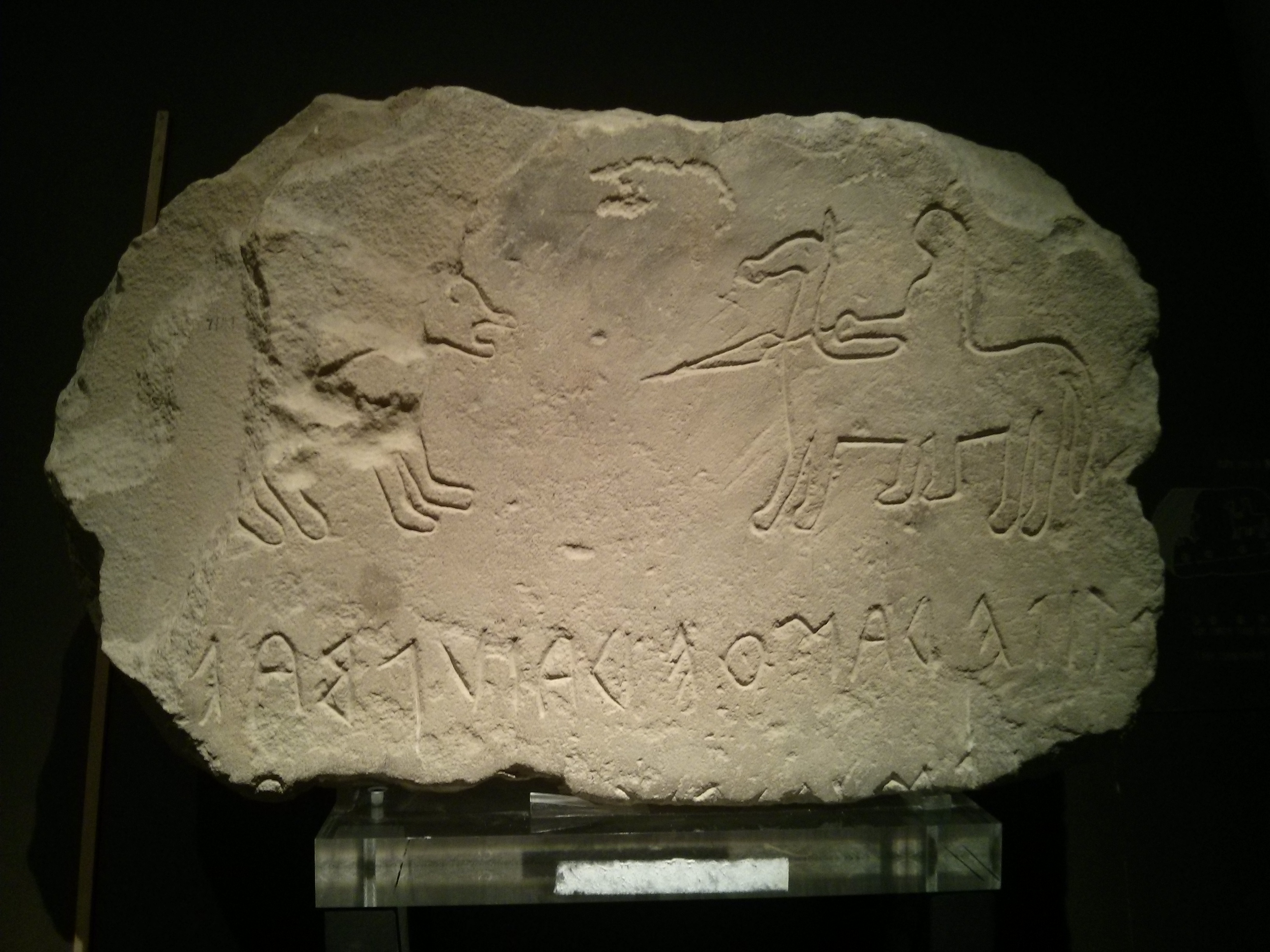
Stelae from Novilara with inscription

The Museo Oliveriano has a collection of Greek bronze statuettes, Ancient Roman art and artifacts, including sculpture, ceramics and coins. It also has objects excavated from the 7-8 AC (pre-Roman) burial at the necropolis of Novilara. These include portions of stelae inscribed in the North Picene language, and one depicting a sea battle with a Liburna. The museum also has a bronze tabula fabrorum. It has artifacts from the sacred grove of Lucus Pisaurensis and the pre-Roman Votive Stones of Pesaro.

The museum includes many Latin epitaphs. It also has a collection of post-Roman medallions.
