= Lucus Pisaurensis =

Sacred grove of ancient Pisaureum

Coordinates: 43.9102°N 12.9133°E

Lucus Pisaurensis is a sacred grove or lucus of ancient Pisaurum, modern Pesaro in Italy. It is just outside the coastal comune of Pesaro, between the Colle della Salute and the Collina in Santa Veneranda. It is in the Pesaro e Urbino Province of Marche, a pre-Roman Empire region of the Sabines and Latins peoples.

== Etymology ==
Pesaro (Italian), fr. Pisaurum (latin), pis (pi π, plural) + (aurum, reflecting gold).

== Discovery ==
The eighteenth-century Italian aristocrat or patrician Annibale degli Abati Olivieri discovered the grove in 1737 in a farm field he owned (Il Pignocco) in Pesaro. He reported this in a manuscript published in 1738, Pisaurensia Marmora, ("Marbles of Pesaro"). Olivieri said that he found the grove in a field by the Chiostro di Santo Gaetano dei Conti. He called the site Lucus Pisaurensis (Sacred Grove of Pesaro) and gave a brief description of his findings. Olivieri wrote that he planned to publish a future work called De Luco Sacro Veterum Pisaurensium ("The Sacred Grove of Ancient Pisaurenses"), once excavations were completed. This was never published and interest in the lucus disappeared after Olivieri's death.

=== Votive stones ===
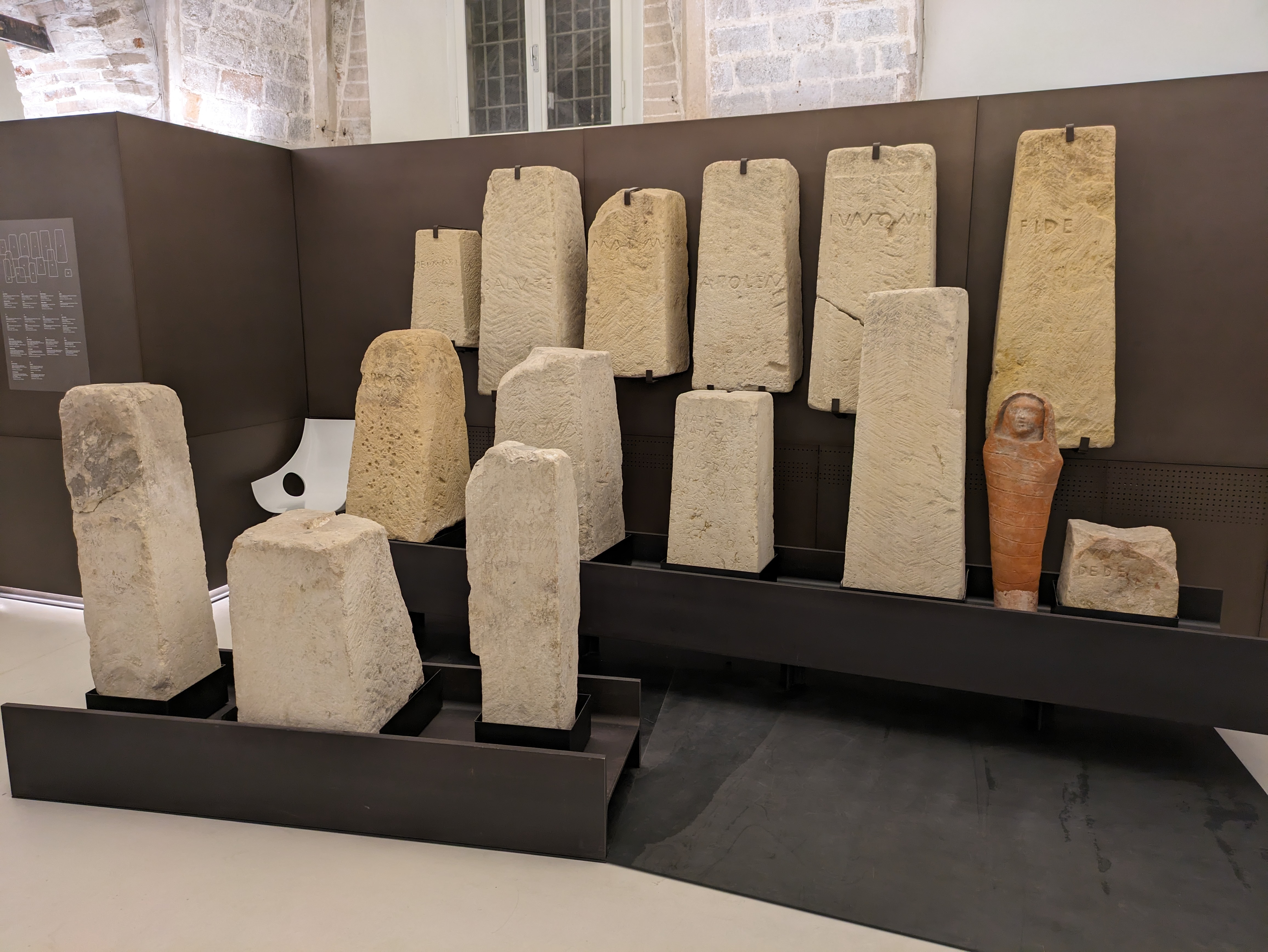
Votive stones from the Lucius Pisaurensis

Oliveri unearthed in the field fourteen votive stones or cippi, carved of sandstone with Sabine inscriptions in a pre-Etruscan script; a number of terracotta and sandstone artifacts; clay & copper coin; and a small bronze object inscribed Libra. The votives were inscribed with names of various Sabine-Etruscan or early Roman gods: Salute, Lucina, Marica, Feronia; as well as the later Roman Gods: Iunos, Diana and Mater Matuta; APOLLO, the Sun-God; MAT[ER]-MATVTA, an ancient semone divinity of luci; FIDE, an ancient goddess of High Divinity status, and IVNONII (Juno), a goddess of multiple origin myths, are a few of the names inscribed on the stones. They are estimated to date from c. 400 BC, a time when Pesaro was called by its Latin name of Pisaurum.

=== Other finds ===
He also found a terracotta borderline marker, inscribed " δ Δ δ luci coiirii CI LX ". Luci Coiiri means 'Coerian Grove' and the Roman numerals are thought to reference land measurements.

Olivieri found other artifacts on his estate, all of which are housed in the Biblioteca Oliveriana and Museo Oliveriano, a museum and library in Pesaro founded by him. The library and museum in Pesaro house the collections of Olivieri, Giovanni Battista Passeri, and Giulio Perticari.

Among these are bronze and clay coinage, carved sandstone stela from 7th c. B.C. depicting naumachia (mock naval battles) and a bronze Tabula Fabrorum with a relief of the Etruscan goddess Menrva (found at Palazzo Barignani).

== 21st century ==
The grove was rediscovered and archaeological interest in the site renewed during excavations in the 21st century. It has been suggested that the site was a meeting place for different groups of people.

== See also ==
- Votive offering {see section on Ancient Offerings}
- Pesaro, Italy, {see section on History}
- Annibale degli Abati Olivieri
- Lucus Pisaurensis, the Sacred Grove of Santa Venerada in Pesaro, Italy
- it:Santa Veneranda (Pesaro)
