= Turullia gens =

Ancient Roman family

The gens Turullia, occasionally spelled Turulia, was an obscure plebeian family at ancient Rome. Only a few members of this gens appear in history, but others are known from inscriptions.

== Origin ==
The nomen Turullius belongs to a class of gentilicia formed from cognomina with diminutive suffixes, such as -ulus, -illus, or -ellus. Nomina ending in -ulius, relatively uncommon, appear to have been formed directly from cognomina ending in -ulus, without having passed through any intermediate forms.

== Praenomina ==
The main praenomina of the Turullii were Gnaeus, Publius, Lucius, and Marcus, all of which were common throughout Roman history. One member of this gens is referred to by some writers as Decimus, but in other sources he is Publius.

== Members ==
This list includes abbreviated praenomina. For an explanation of this practice, see filiation.

- Lucius Turullius Sabinus, possibly triumvir monetalis circa 87 BC. His nomen is uncertain, being interpreted by some scholars as Turius, and others as Titurius.
- Lucius Turullius L. f. Pantera, interred at Rome in an ossuary dating from the first-century BC.
- Decimus Turullius, (Note: Cassius Dio gives his praenomen as Publius.) after the murder of Caesar, in which he participated, was placed in command of a fleet by Gaius Cassius Longinus. He joined Gaius Cassius Parmensis after the Battle of Philippi, and then went over to Marcus Antonius. To build Antony's fleet, Turullius cut down the sacred grove of Aesculapius, which provided Antony a pretext to give him up to Octavian following the Battle of Actium in 31 BC. On Octavian's orders, he was put to death on the island of Cos.
- Publius Turullius P. Ɔ. l. Apollonius, a freedman buried at Rome, together with several other liberti, in a sepulchre dating from the first half of the first century.
- Gnaeus Turullius Cn. l. Evangelus, a freedman buried at Rome, along with the freedman Gnaeus Turullius Dionysius, in a first-century tomb built by one or more of their clients.
- Turullius Ceralis, a centurion primus pilus in the army of Otho in AD 69. He was one of the commanders who surrendered to Caecina, the general of Vitellius, during his siege of Placentia.
- Turullia Primitiva, along with her children, dedicated a second-century tomb at the present site of Aschi Alto, formerly part of Samnium, for Gaius Modius Atimetus, her husband of thirty years, and one of the Seviri Augustales.
- Gnaeus Turullius Smaragdus, built a family sepulchre at Rome, dating from the late second or early third century.

=== Undated Turullii ===
- Turullia, buried in a family sepulchre at Rome, built by her husband, Marcus Acutius Salutaris.
- Turullia M. l. Alethia, a freedwoman interred in an ossuary at Rome.
- Gnaeus Turullius Faustus, buried at Rome, in a tomb built by his daughter, Turullia Flora.
- Turullia Cn. f. Flora, built a tomb at Rome for her father, Gnaeus Turullius Faustus.
- Marcus Turulius Honoratus, together with Sitius Paratus, both magistrates of Thibilis in Numidia, made an offering to the local deity at the present site of Thaya.
- Publius Turullius P. f. Labeo, named in pottery inscriptions from Carthago Nova and other sites in Hispania Citerior.
- Gnaeus Turullius Cn. l. Prothymus, a freedman buried in a late first-century BC tomb at Carthago Nova.

== See also ==
- List of Roman gentes

== Bibliography ==
- Marcus Tullius Cicero, Epistulae ad Familiares.
- Valerius Maximus, Factorum ac Dictorum Memorabilium (Memorable Facts and Sayings).
- Publius Cornelius Tacitus, Historiae.
- Appianus Alexandrinus (Appian), Bellum Civile (The Civil War).
- Lucius Cassius Dio, Roman History.
- Dictionary of Greek and Roman Biography and Mythology, William Smith, ed., Little, Brown and Company, Boston (1849).
- Theodor Mommsen et alii, Corpus Inscriptionum Latinarum (The Body of Latin Inscriptions, abbreviated CIL), Berlin-Brandenburgische Akademie der Wissenschaften (1853–present).
- Wilhelm Henzen, Ephemeris Epigraphica: Corporis Inscriptionum Latinarum Supplementum (Journal of Inscriptions: Supplement to the Corpus Inscriptionum Latinarum), Institute of Roman Archaeology, Rome (1872–1913).
- René Cagnat et alii, L'Année épigraphique (The Year in Epigraphy, abbreviated AE), Presses Universitaires de France (1888–present).
- George Davis Chase, "The Origin of Roman Praenomina", in Harvard Studies in Classical Philology, vol. VIII, pp. 103–184 (1897).
- Paul von Rohden, Elimar Klebs, & Hermann Dessau, Prosopographia Imperii Romani (The Prosopography of the Roman Empire, abbreviated PIR), Berlin (1898).
- T. Robert S. Broughton, The Magistrates of the Roman Republic, American Philological Association (1952–1986).
