= Annibale degli Abati Olivieri =

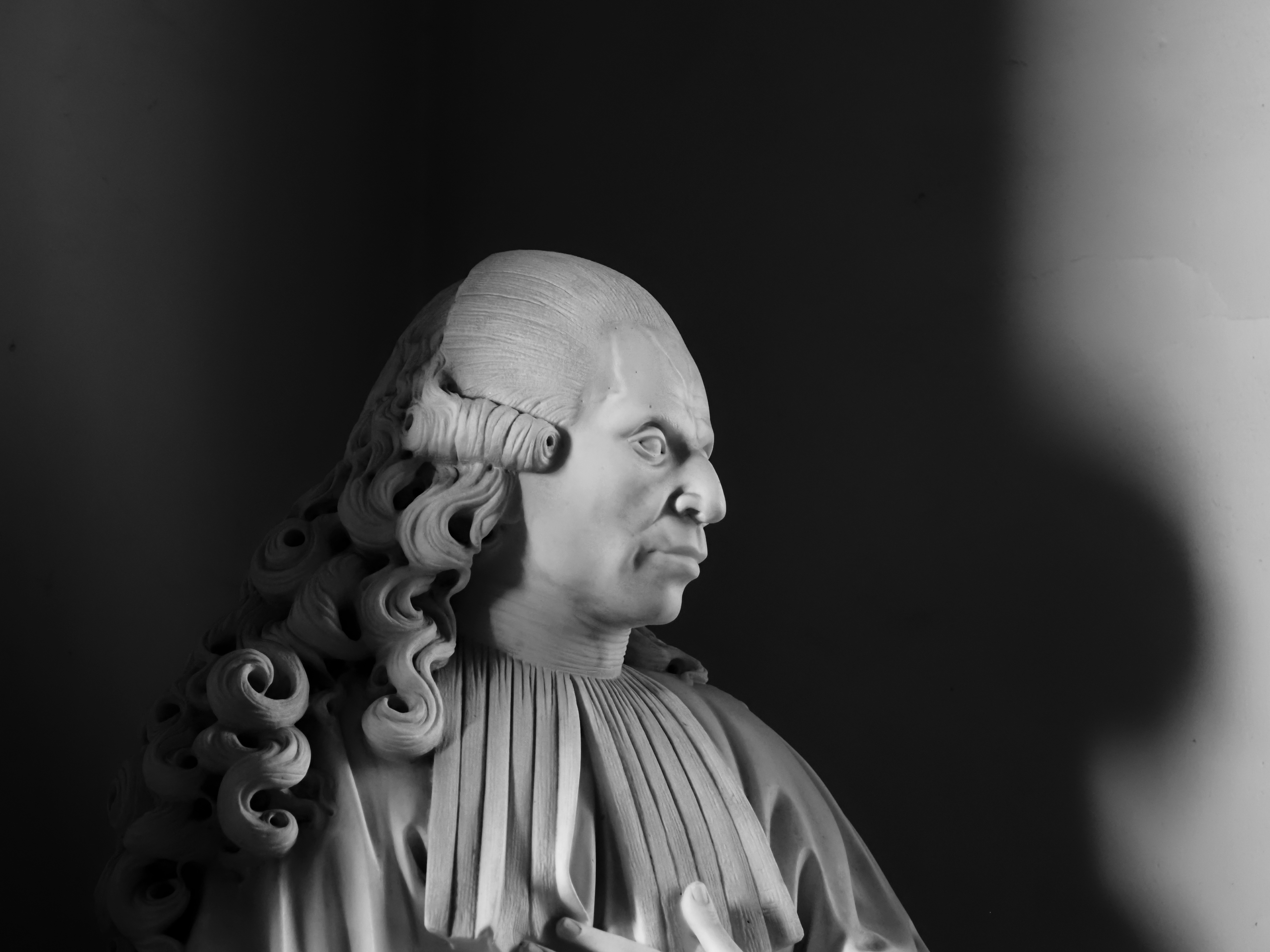
- Born: 17 June 1708; Pesaro, Italy
- Died: 29 September 1789 (aged 81); Pesaro, Italy
- Occupations: Archaeologist, numismatist, librarian
- Known for: Founder of Biblioteca Oliveriana, Pesaro
- Notable work: Marmora Pisaurensia notis illustrata, Esame del Bronzo Lerpiriano

Annibale degli Abati Olivieri (17 June 1708 – 29 September 1789) was an Italian archaeologist, numismatist and librarian, considered the founder of the Biblioteca Oliveriana, Pesaro. An aristocrat without heirs, he was the author of works of archaeology and numismatics. He also discovered the site of a Roman sacred grove, the Lucus Pisaurensis at his property on Collina di Calibano (Hill of Caliban) in the countryside of Pesaro, at which he unearthed the 13 Votive Stones of Pesaro.

== Biography ==
Olivieri was born in Pesaro in 1708. He was educated in Bologna and then went to Pisa, studying with Tommaso Romito, Giuseppe Averani and Luigi Guido Grandi. He graduated in law while in Urbino in 1727, then moved to Rome, where he studied epigraphy. Here, with the assistance of his uncle, Fabio degli Abati Olivieri, he was able to locate rare archaeological finds which were deposited in his personal museum.

In 1735, Olivieri returned to Pesaro, a date which coincides with the publication of his first antiquarian and philological work. Two years later, he completed the Marmora Pisaurensia notis, illustrated. What followed was a period of intense work as evidenced by the many books he wrote. In 1756, he made a large donation to Pesaro: his library of scrolls and many thousands of works, printed and handwritten, of high value and significance for the history and culture of the city, along with a collection of antiques, consisting essentially of material dug up throughout Pesaro. This donation formed the nucleus of the Biblioteca Oliveriana. He died in Pesaro in 1789.

== Selected works ==
- In festo Ascensionis Christi oratio habita in basilica Lateranensi ad sanctissimum d.n. Benedictum 13. pontificem maximum ab Annibale de Abatibus Oliverio Pisaurensi J.V.D. (1728)
- Spiegazione di alcuni monumenti degli antichi Pelasgi : trasportata dal Francese con alcune osservazioni sovra i medesimi. (1735)
- Marmora Pisaurensia notis illustrata (1737)
- Esame della controversia letteraria che passa (1740)
- Dissertazione di Annibale degli Abati Olivieri sopra due antiche tavolette di avorio (1743)
- Elogio dell'Arcidiacono Gio. Giacomo Rubini. (1753)
- Della fondazione di Pesaro : Si aggiunge una lettera (1757)
- Lettera sopra alcuni Vescovi ignoti all'Ughelli. (1761)
- Esame del Bronzo Lerpiriano : pubblicato dallo Spon. (1771)
- Memorie di Tommaso Diplovatazio, patrizio Costantinopolitano (1771)
- Spiegazione : di una delle due antiche Basi di Marmo scoperte il di 22. di Novembre 1770 dal Cavalier Domenico Bonanini letta nella. Acc. Pesarese (1771)
- Ragioni del titolo di provincia metaurense dato alla legazione detta volgarmente di Urbino (1771)
- Della patria della b. Michellina e del b. Cecco del terz'ordine di S. Francesco. (1772)

== See also ==
- Olivieri Archeological Museum and Library
- Lucus Pisaurensis

== Bibliography ==
- Claudi, Giovanni M.; Catri, Liana (2007). Dizionario biografico dei marchigiani (in Italian). Ancona: Il lavoro editoriale. ISBN 978-88-7663-409-3.
- Zicàri, Italo (1960). "ABBATI OLIVIERI-GIORDANI, Annibale degli". Dizionario Biografico degli Italiani (in Italian). Vol. 1: Aaron–Albertucci. Rome: Istituto dell'Enciclopedia Italiana. OCLC 883370.
