= Lucus Augusti =

Lucus Augusti is the Latin name of two different ancient places in the Roman Empire:

- Lugo, a city in Spain
- Luc-en-Diois, a city in France
