= Turia gens =

Ancient Roman family

The gens Turia, occasionally written Turria, was a minor plebeian family at ancient Rome. Several members of this gens are mentioned by Roman writers, although none of them ever obtained the consulship. Lucius Turius, who stood for the consulship in the late Republic, was praetor in 75 BC.

== Origin ==
The nomen Turius is thought to be of Oscan origin. A number of the inscriptions of this gens come from Campania, an Oscan-speaking region of southern Italy.

== Praenomina ==
The main praenomina of the Turii were Lucius, Gaius, Marcus, and Quintus, and Publius, all amongst the most common names at all periods of Roman history. They occasionally used other common names, including Aulus, Sextus, and Titus. One of the Turii bore the Oscan praenomen Statius, which was uncommon at Rome, but frequent in southern Italy.

== Branches and cognomina ==
Besides the Turii who lived in Campania or at Rome, several inscriptions indicate that a number of this family had settled in Etruria by the first century. Some of the Turii established themselves in Africa Proconsularis by the time of Cicero, who writes of an acquaintance of his by the name who had recently died there. The Turii flourished in Roman north Africa through at least the third century.

== Members ==
This list includes abbreviated praenomina. For an explanation of this practice, see filiation.

- Lucius Turius, one of the disputants in a case argued by Cato the Elder, versus Gnaeus Gellius. Aulus Gellius related how Cato asserted that if a claim could not be resolved using the evidence, and both men were of similar character, then the case should be decided in favour of the defendant.
- Lucius Turius L. P. C. l. Sand[...], a freedman named in an inscription from Casilinum in Campania, dating from the first half of the first century BC.
- Lucius Turius, praetor in 75 BC, tried Terentius Varro for repetundae, or extortion, in the province of Asia, but the trial was postponed into the following year. He is likely the same Lucius Turius mentioned by Cicero, as a contemporary who fell just short of election to the consulship. Cicero described his oratory as diligent, but unskilled.
- Turia, the wife of the Quintus Lucretius Vespillo, who was proscribed by the triumvirs in 43 BC. She concealed her husband in a double roof until his name was removed from the list of the proscribed. Because of Turia, Vespillo survived the turbulence of the period, and went on to become consul in 19 BC.
- Quintus Turius, a negotiator, or banker, of excellent character, who died in Africa Proconsularis circa 44 BC, leaving his estate to men of similar reputation. Cicero asked his friend, Quintus Cornificius, to prevent the deceased's freedman, Turius Eros, from maintaining possession of his property.
- Marcus Turius, a legate named on coins from Alexandria Troas. He may have served under Mark Antony in 42 or 41 BC.
- Lucius Turius L. f., buried at Hispellum in Umbria, in a tomb dating from the latter half of the first century BC, had been one of the municipal quattuorvirs and aediles.
- Turia C. Ɔ. l. Salvia, a freedwoman buried at Rome, in a tomb dating from the late first century BC, or early first century AD, along with her son, Liberalis, aged twenty-five.
- Aulus Turius A. (f.?) Ochac[...], named in an Augustan-era inscription from Catina in Sicily.
- Turius, a judge alluded to by Horace, known for threatening to levy heavy damages against those who disputed his decisions. Horace was explaining how those who feel threatened or offended respond, like animals, with their own strongest weapons.
- Gaius Turius, along with Marcus Agrius, one of the municipal duumvirs at Teanum Sidicinum in Campania in an uncertain year between 8 and 6 BC.
- Turia C. f. Sabina, named in an inscription from Teanum Sidicinum, dating from the end of the first century BC, or the beginning of the first century AD. She is probably the same Turia who was the wife of Gnaeus Vesiculanus.
- Marcus Turius Callisthenes, named in an inscription from Rome, dating from the first half of the first century.
- Lucius Turius Etruscus, buried at Perusia in Etruria, in a tomb built by his son, Lucius Turius Fidus, dating from the first half of the first century.
- Lucius Turius L. f. Fidus, built a tomb at Perusia, dating from the first half of the first century, for his father, Lucius Turius Etruscus.
- Statius Turius L. l., a freedman named in a pottery inscription from Tarraco in Hispania Citerior, dating between the reigns of Tiberius and Claudius.
- Turia Fausta, the mistress of Celadus, a slave named along with Lucius Rufrius in a first-century sepulchral inscription from Clusium in Etruria.
- Marcus Turius M. l. Felix, a freedman named in a first-century inscription from Rome.
- Turia Percisa, named in an inscription from Pompeii in Campania.
- Gaius Turius Diligens, named in an inscription from Herculaneum in Campania, dating between AD 60 and 79.
- Turia Saturnina, the freedwoman of Sorana, buried at Rome, in a tomb dedicated by her husband, Placidus, a tabellarius, or courier, employed by the emperor Domitian.
- Lucius Turius Ɔ. l., a freedman named in a first- or second-century inscription from an uncertain location in Umbria.
- Lucius Turius V[...], built a tomb at Rome for his daughter, Turia Sabina, dating between the middle of the first century and the middle of the second.
- Turia L. f. Sabina, a little girl buried at Rome, aged five years, eleven days, in a tomb built by her father, Lucius Turius V[...], dating between the middle of the first century and the middle of the second.
- Marcus Turius Murtilus, buried in an early second-century tomb at Toletum in Hispania Citerior, built by Marcus Magilius.
- Quintus Turius Hospes, buried in a second-century tomb at Castellum Celtianum in Numidia, aged eighty-five.
- Turia Saturnina, buried in a second-century tomb at Castellum Celtianum, aged fifty-one.
- Publius Turrius Felix, a soldier serving in the fifth cohort of the vigiles at Rome in AD 205.
- Lucius Turius Martialis, along with Quintus Cornelius Felix Emeritus, one of the aediles at Giufi in Africa Proconsularis during the reigns of Elagabalus or Severus Alexander.
- Turia Artemisia, buried at Tragurium in Dalmatia, aged thirty-two years, eight months, in a tomb built by her son, Julius Artemisianus, dating between the middle of the second century and the end of the third.
- Turia Hilaritas, dedicated a third-century tomb at Rome for her husband, Eunus, aged forty years, ten days.
- Turia Ingenua, buried at Parma in Cisalpine Gaul, in a third-century tomb built by her husband, Claudius Valerius, with whom she had lived for one year, eight months, and eight days.
- Lucius Turius Fabius Lucanianus, a little boy buried at Aradi in Africa Proconsularis, aged four years, four months, and nineteen days, along with his mother, Zasgia Victoria Cezzonia, aged thirty-five years, eight months, and sixteen days, in a tomb dating from the middle of the third century.
- Turius Verna, curator of Tacapae and Capsa in Africa Proconsularis in AD 280.

=== Undated Turii ===
- Gaius Turius, named in an inscription from Stobi in Macedonia.
- Titus Turius, named in a pottery inscription from Ariminum in Etruria.
- Turia Abuscula, built a tomb at Rome.
- Turia L. l. Ammia, a freedwoman buried at Rome.
- Turius Camillus, a member of the shipbuilders' guild at Portus in Latium.
- Turius Casius, built a tomb for Turius Marcellus at Theveste in Africa Proconsularis. Turius Victorinus, likely his son, decorated the altar.
- Gaius Turius Chrestes, buried at Gades in Hispania Baetica.
- Turia L. f. Crispina, dedicated a tomb at Horta in Etruria for her husband, Marcus Publicius Januarius Major.
- Turia Faustiana, buried at Castellum Tidditanorum in Numidia, aged seventy-five.
- Turius Felix, buried in an uncertain province, aged nineteen.
- Quintus Turius Q. f. Felix, named in a sepuchral inscription from Rome.
- Turius Gemellus, along with his wife, built a tomb at Tichilla in Africa Proconsularis for their son. The names of his wife and son are not preserved.
- Lucius Turius Ɔ. l. Hilarus, a freedman named in a sepulchral inscription from Rome.
- Gaius Turius Lollianus, a member of the guild of scaffolding engineers, buried at Rome. His parents made an offering on his behalf on his birthday, the fourth day (Note: March 12, by modern reckoning.) before the Ides of March.
- Turia Maia, buried at Milevum in Numidia, aged sixty.
- Turia Marcella, named in an inscription from Illici in Hispania Citerior.
- Turius Marcellus, buried at Theveste, in a tomb built by Turius Marcellus, perhaps his son. His grandson, Turius Victorinus, decorated the altar.
- Marcus Turius Marcianus, built a tomb at Ammaedara in Africa Proconsularis for his mother, Callonia Aphrodisia, aged fifty-four.
- Turia Maxima, named along with Lucius Manilius, in an inscription from the site of modern Khanguet el Bey, formerly part of Africa Proconsularis.
- Quintus Turius Menonianus, named in an inscription from Bisca.
- Gaius Turius C. f. Nepotianus, buried at Tubusuctu in Mauretania Caesariensis.
- Lucius Turrius L. f. Quadratus, buried at Rome, alongside Herennia Rufa, perhaps his wife.
- Sextus Turius Rognius, buried at Tunis in Africa Proconsularis, aged seventy-one.
- Sextus Turius Suavis, buried at Gades, aged seventy-four.
- Turia Theogenis, buried at Rome, in a tomb built by her husband, Tiberius Claudius Attalus, and Gaius Pontius Eutactus.
- Marcus Turrius M. l. Trypho, a freedman buried at Rome, along with the freedwoman Mallia Asia, perhaps his wife.
- Turius Victorinus, perhaps the son of Turius Casius, decorated the altar for the tomb of his grandfather, Turius Marcellus, at Theveste.

== See also ==
- List of Roman gentes

== Bibliography ==
- Marcus Tullius Cicero, Brutus, Epistulae ad Familiares.
- Quintus Horatius Flaccus (Horace), Satirae (Satires).
- Valerius Maximus, Factorum ac Dictorum Memorabilium (Memorable Facts and Sayings).
- Appianus Alexandrinus (Appian), Bellum Civile (The Civil War).
- Aulus Gellius, Noctes Atticae (Attic Nights).
- Dictionary of Greek and Roman Biography and Mythology, William Smith, ed., Little, Brown and Company, Boston (1849).
- Theodor Mommsen et alii, Corpus Inscriptionum Latinarum (The Body of Latin Inscriptions, abbreviated CIL), Berlin-Brandenburgische Akademie der Wissenschaften (1853–present).
- Bullettino della Commissione Archeologica Comunale in Roma (Bulletin of the Municipal Archaeological Commission of Rome, abbreviated BCAR), (1872–present).
- Mélanges d'Archéologie et d'Histoire de l'École Française de Rome (Archaeological and Historical Collections of the French School at Rome, abbreviated MEFR), Paris, Rome (1881–present).
- René Cagnat et alii, L'Année épigraphique (The Year in Epigraphy, abbreviated AE), Presses Universitaires de France (1888–present).
- George Davis Chase, "The Origin of Roman Praenomina", in Harvard Studies in Classical Philology, vol. VIII, pp. 103–184 (1897).
- Paul von Rohden, Elimar Klebs, & Hermann Dessau, Prosopographia Imperii Romani (The Prosopography of the Roman Empire, abbreviated PIR), Berlin (1898).
- Stéphane Gsell, Inscriptions Latines de L'Algérie (Latin Inscriptions from Algeria), Edouard Champion, Paris (1922–present).
- Alfred Merlin, Inscriptions Latines de La Tunisie (Latin Inscriptions from Tunisia), Fondation Dourlans, Paris (1944).
- T. Robert S. Broughton, The Magistrates of the Roman Republic, American Philological Association (1952–1986).
- Josep Corell, Inscripcions romanes d'Ilici, Lucentum, Allon, Dianium i els seus territoris (Inscripcions romanes d'Ilici, Lucentum, Allon, Dianium i els seus territoris), Nau Libres, Valencia (1999).
- Steven L. Tuck, Latin Inscriptions in the Kelsey Museum: The Dennison and De Criscio Collections, Ann Arbor (2005).
- Manfred Clauss, Anne Kolb, & Wolfgang A. Slaby, Epigraphik Datenbank Clauss/Slaby (abbreviated EDCS).
