= Priest (ancient Rome) =

Religious official in ancient Roman religion

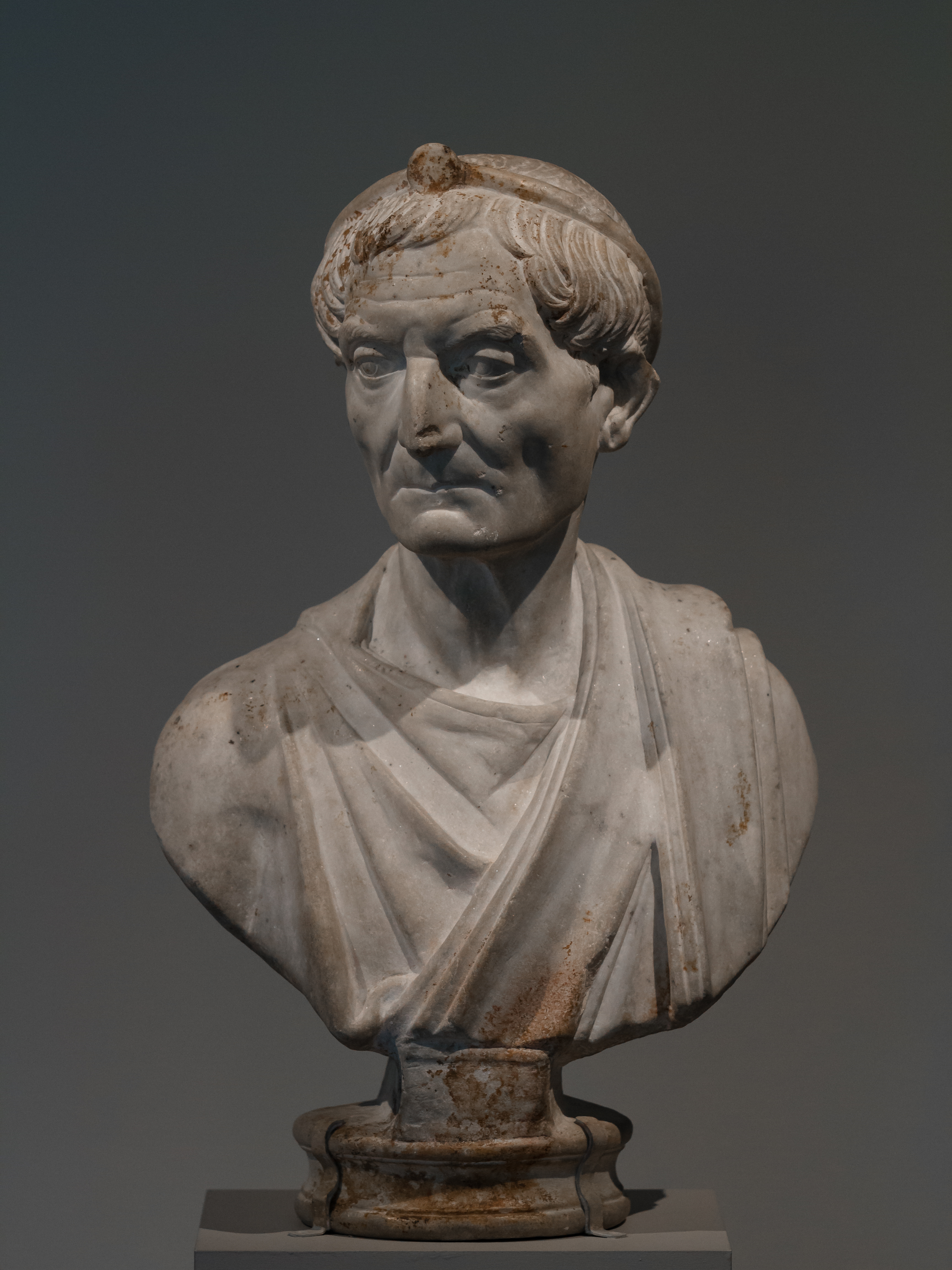
Marble bust of a priest from the Hadrianic period.

The priest (in Latin sacerdos, plural sacerdotes) is, in Roman religion, an official figure responsible for the care, supervision, and control of everything concerning the gods, any object or being belonging to them, any act directed towards them (offerings, sacrifices), and any phenomenon considered a particular sign of their will. The word sacerdos comes from the adjective sacer (“sacred”) and dos, a word related to the root da, which expresses the idea of giving.

The sacerdos did not have, in ancient Rome, exclusivity over the practice of the usual rites of worship, such as prayers, libations, sacrifices, vows, dedications, etc., whether in their private capacity or on behalf of the state. Thus, magistrates performed or presided over religious ceremonies on behalf of the state, and heads of families rendered the prescribed honors to domestic or gentilicial deities. However, only the sacerdotes were “experts” or “professionals” in religious acts: indeed, even the most common sacrifices were performed according to meticulous rules that could not be observed without precise knowledge of the rites and extensive experience. Therefore, the sacerdotes publici populi romani were tasked with controlling and overseeing not only public worship but also private, domestic, and gentilicial religious ceremonies.

Unlike magistrates and heads of families, they were specifically appointed, through special nomination procedures, to perform their liturgical functions; as priests, they had specific duties, rights, and privileges.

== Types of priesthoods ==
Roman priesthoods were numerous and varied, and were not linked to one another by hierarchical ties to form a cohesive whole. Three types can be distinguished:

- Individual priesthoods: these priests, individually responsible for serving the cult of a specific deity, usually bore the title of flamines. However, the term sacerdos or sacerdotes was officially used to designate priests attached to various cults, if not of purely Roman origin, at least adopted early by Rome: thus, we find sacerdotes Albani, Cabenses, Caeninenses, Lanuvini, Laurentes Lavinates, Laurentini, Suciniani, Tasculani. In the feminine, it was used to designate certain priestesses of cults belonging to the ritus graecus, such as the sacerdoces publicae Cereris populi romani Quiritium, the sacerdotes Bonae Deae, and the sacerdotes Matris Deum Magnae XV virales. There are lower-ranking sacerdotes, such as the sacerdotes bidentales, the sacerdos virginum Vestalium, and the sacerdotes sacrae Urbisi.
- sodalitas: these brotherhoods, dedicated to a specific cult, more faithfully preserved the primitive type of gentilicial associations. The official sodalities were those of the luperci, the fratres arvales, the salians, and the titii; later, under the Empire, a sodality was created whose members bore the title of sodales Augustales to perpetuate the cult of the gens Julia.
- colleges, created by the state to establish religious tradition and guide public authority in fulfilling the state’s duties towards the gods. These were more like assemblies of theologians than true religious brotherhoods. The priestly colleges of the Roman state were those of the pontiffs, the augurs, the fetials, the decemvirs, then the quindecimvirs, and the epulones.

As John Scheid notes, two types of priests can be distinguished: some are akin to incarnations of the deity—the most notable example being the major flamines—while others, more numerous, such as the pontiffs and augurs, are involved in rites and the religious legitimation of public acts. John Scheid refers to the former as “priest-statues” and the latter as “masters of the sacred.”

== Methods of nomination ==
The Roman priests (sacerdotes publici populi romani), who were probably originally appointed by the king, were designated under the Republic:

- the holders of collective priesthoods by cooptation, then by an election subject to certain special conditions,
- the holders of individual priesthoods either by the Pontifex maximus or by the college of Duumviri (then Decemviri, then Quindecimviri sacris faciundis).

Under the Empire, regardless of theoretical and official rules, in practice, the nomination of both depended on the imperial will.

=== Case of sodalitas and colleges ===
The priests of sodalitas and colleges were recruited for a long time by cooptation and appointed their president by a free vote.

The first deviations from this rule, which seems to have been general, occurred in the 3rd century BC. Livy mentions for the first time in the year 212 BC the convening of comitia for the designation of the Pontifex maximus. It is assumed that the first plebeian to hold this priesthood, Tiberius Coruncanius, was, in 254 BC, similarly designated by comitia. In reality, these comitia, composed of only seventeen out of thirty-five tribes, represented only a minority of citizens, and their role in practice was to pre-designate one of the pontiffs whom the college would then coopt: thus, great care was taken to respect, at least in appearance, traditional principles and customs while satisfying the demands of the democratic party. The tribunes of the plebs did not stop there: in 145 BC, C. Licinius Crassus proposed a law according to which popular election would replace cooptation in the designation of members of religious colleges. This law was not passed. However, in 104 BC, the tribune Gnaeus Domitius Ahenobarbus succeeded in passing the lex Domitia, which extended ceteris sacerdotiis the procedure used for over a century for the designation of the Pontifex Maximus. By cetera sacerdotia, this meant all religious functions previously conferred by cooptation: thus, the members of sodalities and colleges were henceforth to be designated by restricted comitia before being coopted according to the rules of religious law. Repealed by Sulla, who restored the old method of cooptation at least for the two major colleges of pontiffs and augurs (lex Cornelia de pontificum augurumque collegiis), the lex Domitia was reinstated and seemingly strengthened by the lex Atia. This law, passed in 63 BC on the proposal of the tribune T. Atius Labienus, once again entrusted the preliminary designation for priestly functions to the comitia of seventeen tribes; moreover, it assigned the presidency of these special comitia not to the Pontifex maximus but to the consuls.

The reforms of Caesar and Augustus effectively led, despite appearances to the contrary, to the abolition of cooptation. The emperor, by right the Pontifex maximus and absolute master of the state, was granted in 29 BC the power to freely assign priesthoods and add as many supernumerary priests to each college as he wished.

=== Case of individual priesthoods ===
The holders of individual priesthoods, such as the flamines, the Rex sacrorum, and the Vestal Virgins, were appointed by the Pontifex maximus, considered the head of the national religion and the director of public worship. It is likely, on the other hand, that the duumviri, then decemviri, then Quindecimviri sacris faciundis appointed the priests of foreign cults admitted and recognized by the Roman state, such as the priests of the Great Mother of the Gods and the priestesses of Ceres, etc.

Under the Empire, all the prerogatives of the Pontifex maximus passed to the emperor, whose authority also extended over the college of Quindecimvirs as well as all others.

=== Conditions for nomination ===
Various conditions were required for candidates for priesthood.

There were first very general conditions, such as:

- the absence of any physical blemish or disability,
- the absence of any criminal conviction,
- possession of Roman citizenship,
- freeborn status.

Other conditions were also required during certain periods; for example, under the monarchy and during the early centuries of the Republic, only patricians could be coopted into colleges and sodalities or appointed as priests by the Pontifex maximus: it was only in 300 BC that the lex Ogulnia opened the two major colleges of Pontiffs and Augurs to plebeians and even granted them a majority by right.

It is likely that most other priesthoods also became accessible to plebeians: only the functions of the Rex sacrorum, the three major flamines, and the Salii seem to have remained reserved for patricians.

This situation was modified by Augustus. Henceforth, the various public priesthoods could only be held and exercised:

- some by members of the senatorial order (the four major colleges, most of the ancient sodalities, and the new sodalities created for the cult of deified emperors (Augustales, Flaviales, Titiales, Cocceiani, Ulpiales, etc.), the functions of Rex sacrorum, the three major flamines, and the Vestals);
- others by members of the equestrian order.

Ordinary citizens were thus excluded.

== Hierarchy of priesthoods ==
While it is inaccurate to speak of an official and organized hierarchy for the sacerdotes publici populi romani, it would be equally contrary to historical reality to deny the existence of hierarchical relationships among them, some established by tradition, others by the history of the cult itself.

Under the monarchy, it seems that all priests were subordinate to the king, and they were ranked among themselves according to the status assigned to the god whose cult was entrusted to them.

A frequently cited text by Sextus Pompeius Festus informs us that the traditional ordo sacerdotum was as follows:

The greatest appears to be the king; then comes the flamen of Jupiter; after him the priest of Mars, in fourth place that of Quirinus, and in fifth rank the great pontiff. Thus, at banquets, the king alone takes place on the couch above all. Likewise, the priest of Jupiter takes place above those of Mars and Quirinus, and the priest of Mars above the latter. Likewise, all take place above the pontiff.

Under the Republic, the priestly organization was characterized by the undisputed predominance of the Pontifex Maximus: among the colleges and sodalities, the Pontiffs, Augurs, Septemviri Epulonum, and Duumviri (then Decemviri, then Quindecimviri sacris faciundis) formed the quattuor amplissima collegia. It is also evident that the Pontifex maximus exercised particular authority over priests and priestesses, over the flamines, and over the Vestals, whom he appointed and invested with their priestly functions; similarly, the priestesses of Ceres and the priests of the Mother of the Gods were subordinate to the Duumviri, etc., sacris faciundis.

=== Subordinate agents of the cult ===
Attached to the colleges, sodalities, and individuals holding individual priesthoods was a numerous staff of subordinate agents and cult servants, apparitores (apparitors), calatores (heralds), camilli, cultrarii, lictores, popae, tibicines (flute players), viatores, etc.

== See also ==
- Religion in ancient Rome
- Roman culture
- Etruscan religion
- Roman Empire
- List of pontifices maximi
- Glossary of ancient Roman religion

== Bibliography ==
- "Sacerdos". Daremberg [Daremberg] (in French).
- Szemler, G. J. (1972). The Priests of the Roman Republic. Brussels: Unknown.
- Porte, D. (1989). Les donneurs de sacré, le prêtre à Rome [The Givers of the Sacred, the Priest in Rome] (in French). Paris: Les Belles Lettres.
- Scheid, J. (1998). La religion des romains [The Religion of the Romans] (in French). Malakoff: Armand Collin.
- Scheid, J. (2001). Religion et piété à Rome [Religion and Piety in Rome] (in French). Paris: Albin Michel.
- Jörg Rüpke (2007). "Roman Religion – Religions of Rome". In A Companion to Roman Religion. Blackwell.
- Janet Huskinson, Experiencing Rome: Culture, Identity and Power in the Roman Empire (Routledge, 2000).
- Boatwright, Mary Taliaferro, ed. (2012). The Romans: from village to empire (2nd ed.). New York: Oxford University Press. ISBN 978-0-19-973057-5.
- Scheid, John; Lloyd, Janet (2003). An introduction to Roman religion. Bloomington: Indiana University Press. ISBN 978-0-253-34377-2.
