= Giulio Perticari =

Italian writer and poet

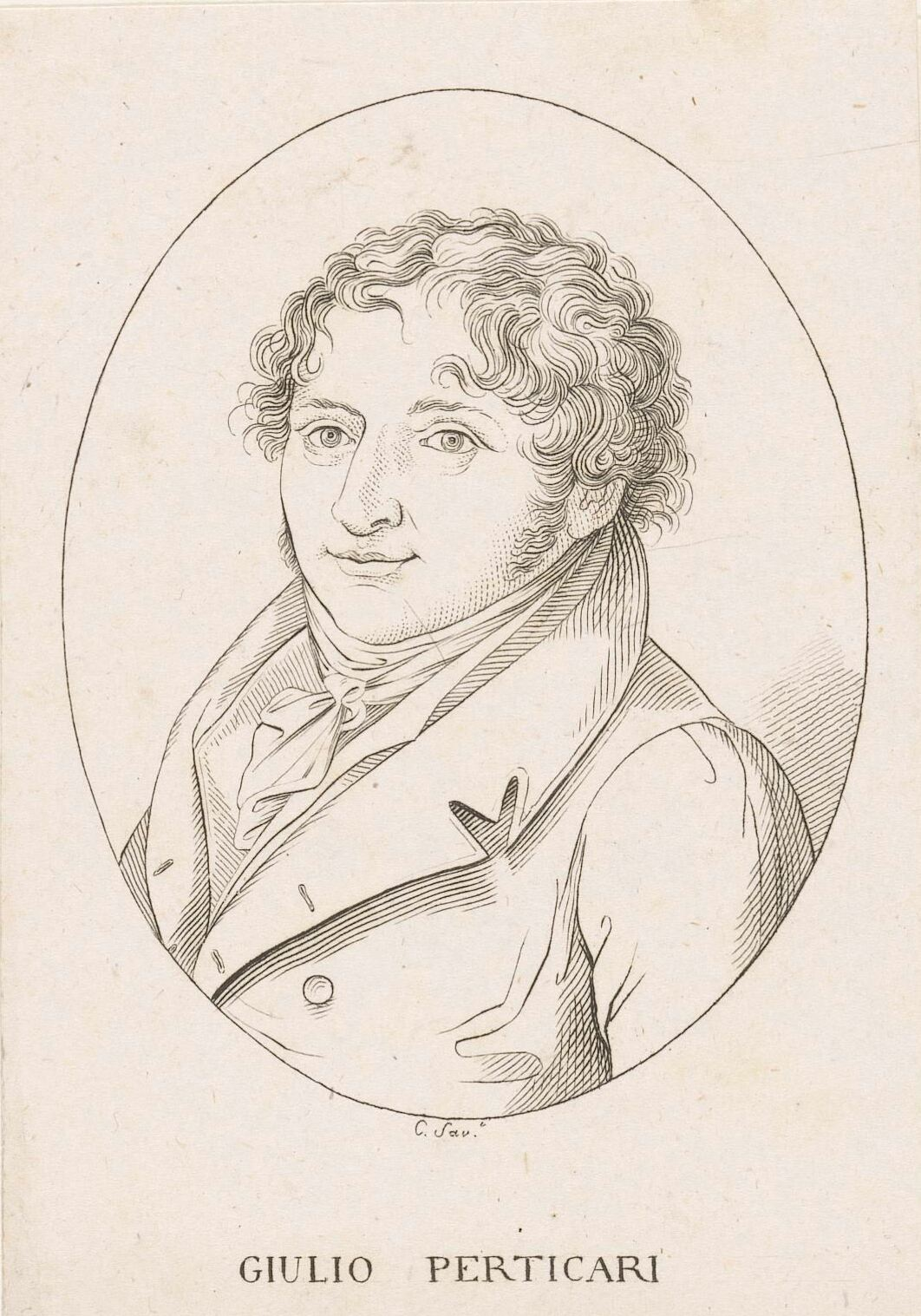
- Portrait of Giulio Perticari, c. 1837
- Born: 15 August 1779; Savignano sul Rubicone, Papal States
- Died: 26 June 1822 (aged 42); San Costanzo, Papal States
- Occupations: Philologist; Intellectual; Journalist
- Spouse: Costanza Monti (m. 1812)
- Children: 2
- Parent(s): Andrea Perticari and Anna Perticari (née Cassi)
- Writing career
- Pen name: Eulinto Seutronio
- Language: Italian language
- Period: 18th century; 19th century
- Genres: Treatise; pamphlet
- Subject: Italian language
- Notable works: Degli scrittori del Trecento e de' loro imitatori Dell'amor patrio di Dante e del suo libro intorno il Volgare Eloquio
- Literary movement: Neoclassicism

Giulio Perticari (15 August 1779 – 26 June 1822) was an Italian poet and scholar.

== Biography ==
Giulio Perticari was born in Savignano sul Rubicone, a small town about 30 kilometres (19 mi) southeast of Forlì. He was the eldest son of a noble family from Pesaro. At the age of ten he was sent to the provincial college of Fano, and in 1801 he moved to Rome, where he studied mathematics, jurisprudence, and literature. Perticari was one of the defenders of the neoclassicists, against the new-fangled romantics. In 1812, he married Costanza Monti, and became a close literary associate of her father, the poet Vincenzo Monti. In the dispute about the Italian language, he became Monti's chief supporter against purism. Perticari's Degli scrittori del Trecento e de' loro imitatori (1818) and Dell'amor patrio di Dante e del suo libro intorno al Volgare Eloquio (1820) maintain that the language of every other century has equal claims with that of the fourteenth to be regarded as the true Italian. In 1819, he founded the literary magazine Giornale Arcadico, of which he was a regular contributor. Perticari died on 26 June 1822 in San Costanzo.

== Works ==
- Degli scrittori del Trecento e de' loro imitatori, 1818;
- Dell'amor patrio di Dante e del suo libro intorno al Volgare Eloquio, 1820.

== Sources ==
- Lindon, John (2002). "Perticari, Giulio, Count". The Oxford Companion to Italian Literature. Oxford University Press.
- Brambilla, Simona (2015). "PERTICARI, Giulio". Dizionario Biografico degli Italiani (in Italian). Vol. 82: Pazzi–Pia. Rome: Istituto dell'Enciclopedia Italiana. ISBN 978-88-12-00032-6.
- Di Martino, Anna Maria (1997). Quel divino ingegno, Giulio Perticari, un intellettuale tra impero e Restaurazione. Naples: Liguori. ISBN 8820726777.
- Lucchini, Guido (2005). "Note e appunti sulla collaborazione tra Monti e Perticari". Vincenzo Monti Nella Cultura Italiana. I (2). Milan: 915–937.
- Montanari, Giuseppe Ignazio (1836). Biografia di Giulio Perticari. Rome: tipografia delle Belle Arti.
