= Pesaro Altarpiece (Bellini) =

Oil on panel painting by Giovanni Bellini

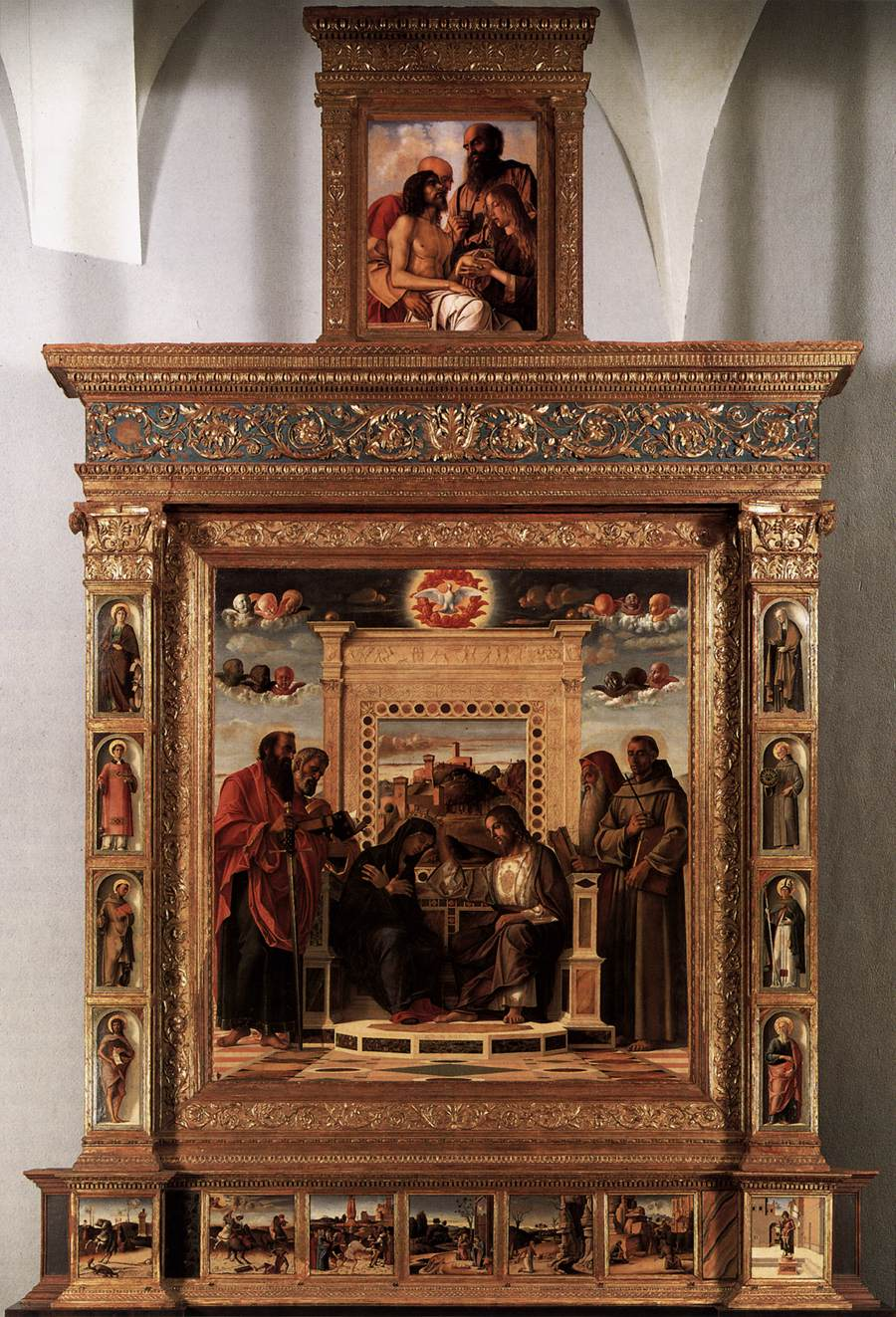
- Artist: Giovanni Bellini
- Year: c. 1471–1483
- Medium: oil on panel
- Dimensions: 262 cm × 240 cm (103 in × 94 in)
- Location: Civic Museum of Palazzo Mosca, Pesaro

The Pesaro Altarpiece (Italian: Pala di Pesaro) is an oil-on-panel painting by the Italian artist Giovanni Bellini, dated to some time between 1471 and 1483. It is considered one of Bellini's first mature works, though there are doubts on its dating and on who commissioned it. The work's technique is not only an early use of oils but also of blue smalt, a by-product of the glass industry. It had already been used in the Low Countries in Bouts' 1455 The Entombment, but this marked smalt's first use in Italian art, twenty years before Leonardo da Vinci used it in Ludovico il Moro's apartments in Milan in 1492. Bellini also uses the more traditional lapis lazuli and azurite for other blues in the work.

It was originally located in San Francesco church in Pesaro in Marche, when that church was suppressed under the French occupation in 1797. The altarpiece was initially moved to the city council and after various issues it was entrusted to the city's art museum, where it still hangs.

== Dating ==
No documents survive to date the altarpiece definitively. Oils only became popular in Venice after the arrival of Antonello da Messina in 1475, so it is unlikely to have been produced before that date. In his will in 1476 the painter Giovanni Pizzimegli offered to make a payment to help meet the cost of a high altarpiece for the church of San Francesco, but does not specify if the work was planned, in progress or complete, meaning it cannot definitely be identified with the Pala of Pesaro. The oldest theories by Roger Fry, Giovanni Battista Cavalcaselle and Frizzone date it to around 1481, whereas in 1914, the critic Roberto Longhi initially dated it to 1465–1470; and then in a re-analysis performed in 1927, dated it to 1475. Most critics agreed with Longhi until Pallucchini (1959) and Meiss (1963) proposed 1470–1471, based on comparisons with the altarpiece's central scene of the Coronation of the Virgin with the Enthroned Madonna with Saints by Marco Zoppo (now in the Staatliche Museen, Berlin).

The work shows a number of forts, such as the one held by saint Terence of Pesaro on the predella, which Everett Fahy identified as Fortezza Costanza, planned by Francesco Laurana for the Sforza at Pesaro in 1474 and completed in 1479, although its final appearance had already been publicized on a medal by Gianfrancesco Enzola dated to 1475. The similarity is not precise enough to prove this hypothetical dating. In 1909 Vaccia stated that the fortress in the background of the Coronation scene was based on Rocca di Gradara, captured from Pesaro by Rimini in 1463, which would make the altarpiece a celebration of the capture itself or of an anniversary of it.

More recent studies by Battisti and Castelli have suggested the 1480s, linking the work's iconology to political events such as Camilla d'Aragona's regency from 1483 onwards or religious disputes of the period, such as those between the Franciscans and Dominicans. Another theory links the work to the marriage celebrations between Costanzo I Sforza and Camilla d'Aragona in 1474.

== Components ==
=== Coronation of the Virgin ===
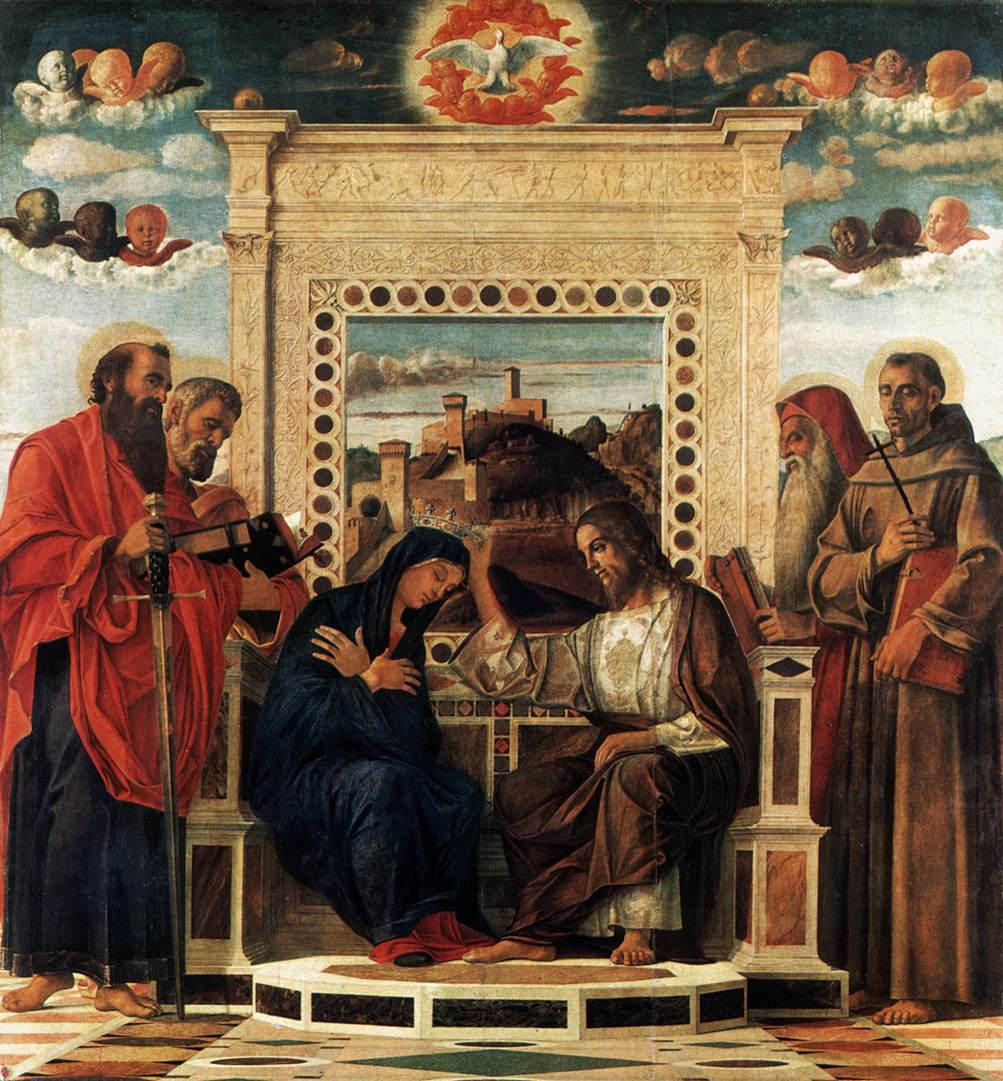
Coronation of the Virgin

The main central panel shows the coronation of the Virgin, unusually shown on earth rather than in heaven. To the left are Saint Peter and Saint Paul and to the right are Saint Jerome and Saint Francis. Mary and Christ sit on a marble throne whose open back reveals a realistic rocky landscape, surrounded by a border that is identical to the original gilded intaglio frame for the work. In the upper centre is the dove of the Holy Spirit, with cherubim and seraphim to its left and right. The floor is set with marble inlays, which emphasise the perspective and balance of the composition. Bellini combines lessons drawn from his brother-in-law Andrea Mantegna with clear light and a synthesis between architecture, figures and landscape drawn from Piero della Francesca and the oil technique of Antonello da Messina, both of whose work he may have seen on a possible trip to the Marche, his mother's homeland.

=== Pilasters ===
The cornice is held up by two pilasters, each 61 cm by 25 cm and each with a single deep perspective. The left hand one shows the saints Catherine of Alexandria, Lawrence, Anthony of Padua and John the Baptist, whilst the right hand one shows blessed Michelina, Bernardino of Siena, Louis of Toulouse and Andrew. Many of these saints were promoted by the Franciscans around this time.

=== Predella ===
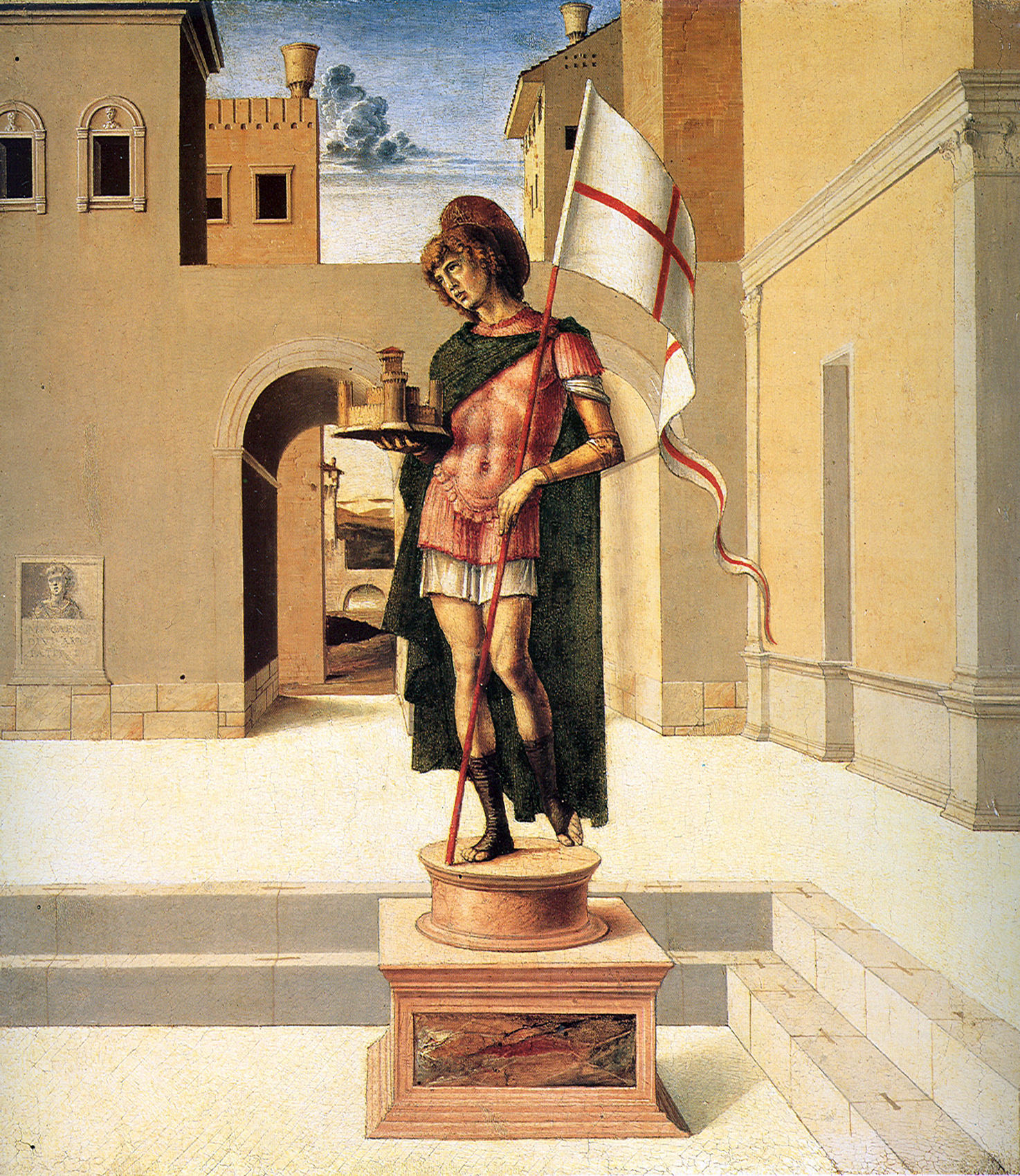
Saint Terence

Below the work is a predella showing a central nativity scene. To its left are scenes of St George and the dragon, Conversion of St Paul and Crucifixion of St Peter, whilst to its right are St Jerome in the Desert, St Francis Receiving the Stigmata and Saint Terence. These scenes were carefully chosen - for example, Francis was the church's patron and was also linked to the Sforza via the Franciscan order, George was linked to the Sforza court as a 'holy knight' and St Terence (shown as a Roman soldier) was Pesaro's patron saint. Placing St George and St Terence in the prime positions at far left and far right, usually used for coats of arms, probably underlined the Sforza family's military and civic power. Behind St Terence is an ancient Roman bust above an inscription praising Augustus and comparing him favourably with the Duke.

=== Pieta ===
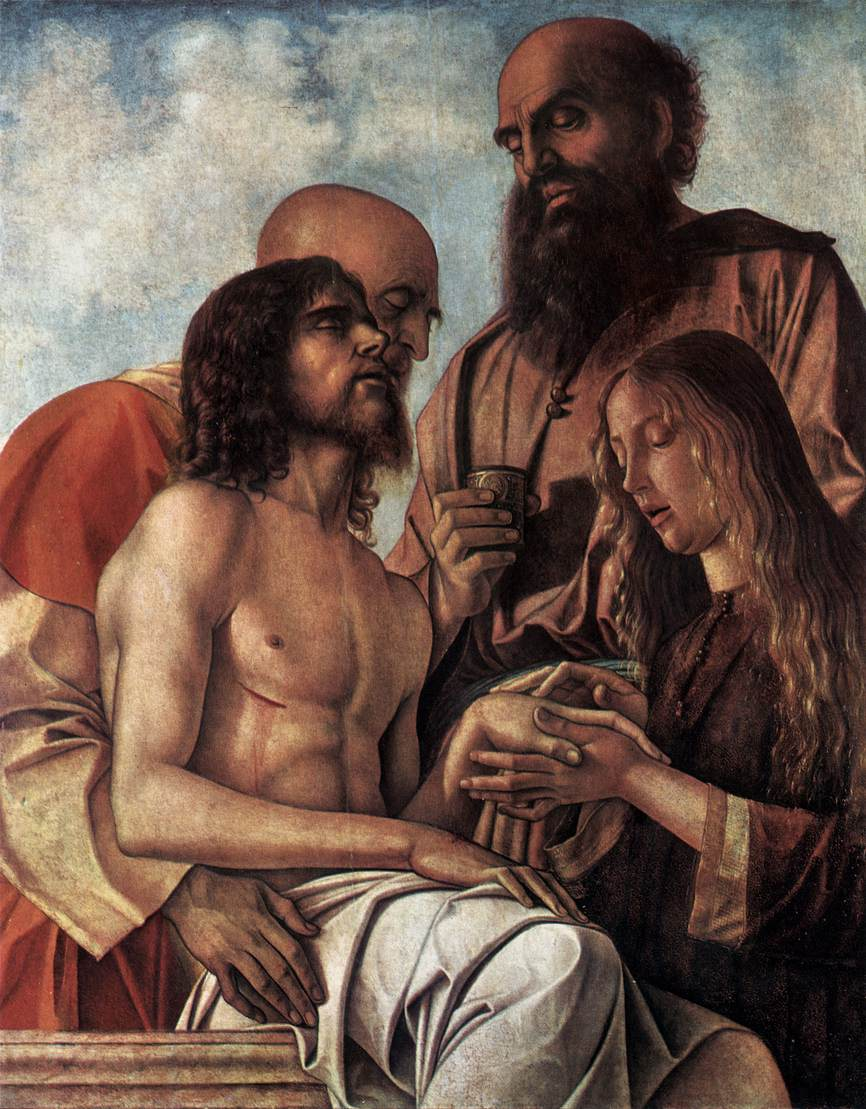
Pietà

The work was previously topped by a 106 cm by 84 cm Pieta, which breaks away from previous treatments of the theme, not showing Christ's body frontally but resting on the edge of the tomb. A servant holds Christ up from behind, whilst Nicodemus hands a jar of ointment to a kneeling Mary Magdalene, who holds Christ's hand.

The pieta was separated from the main painting in 1797 and taken to Paris, recovered in 1815 by Antonio Canova and taken to Rome. There it was allocated to the Pinacoteca Vaticana, where it still hangs. This Pieta was attributed to several other artists, from Bartolomeo Montagna to Giovanni Buonconsiglio, before it was finally attributed to Andrea Mantegna. Writing in 1913, Frizzoni recognised it as the upper part of the Pesaro Altarpiece, which was then topped instead by a painting of St. Jerome. This is now the consensus view, though Ileana Chiappini argues the two works have different focal points and so were created separately and only joined later.

=== Frame ===
This refers to Venetian funerary monuments of the same era, such as doge Pasquale Malipiero's monument (designed by Pietro Lombardo for Santi Giovanni e Paolo) and Mantegna's San Zeno Altarpiece. Bellini further developed his use of the frame as an integral part of the painting in later works such as the San Giobbe Altarpiece and the Frari Triptych.

== See also ==
- List of works by Giovanni Bellini
