= Costanzo Sforza =

Costanzo Sforza may refer to the following members of the Sforza family (branch of Pesaro):

- Costanzo I Sforza (1447–1483)
- Costanzo II Sforza (1510–1512), last lord of Pesaro of the family
