= San Giovanni Sacristy =

Frescoes by Luca Signorelli

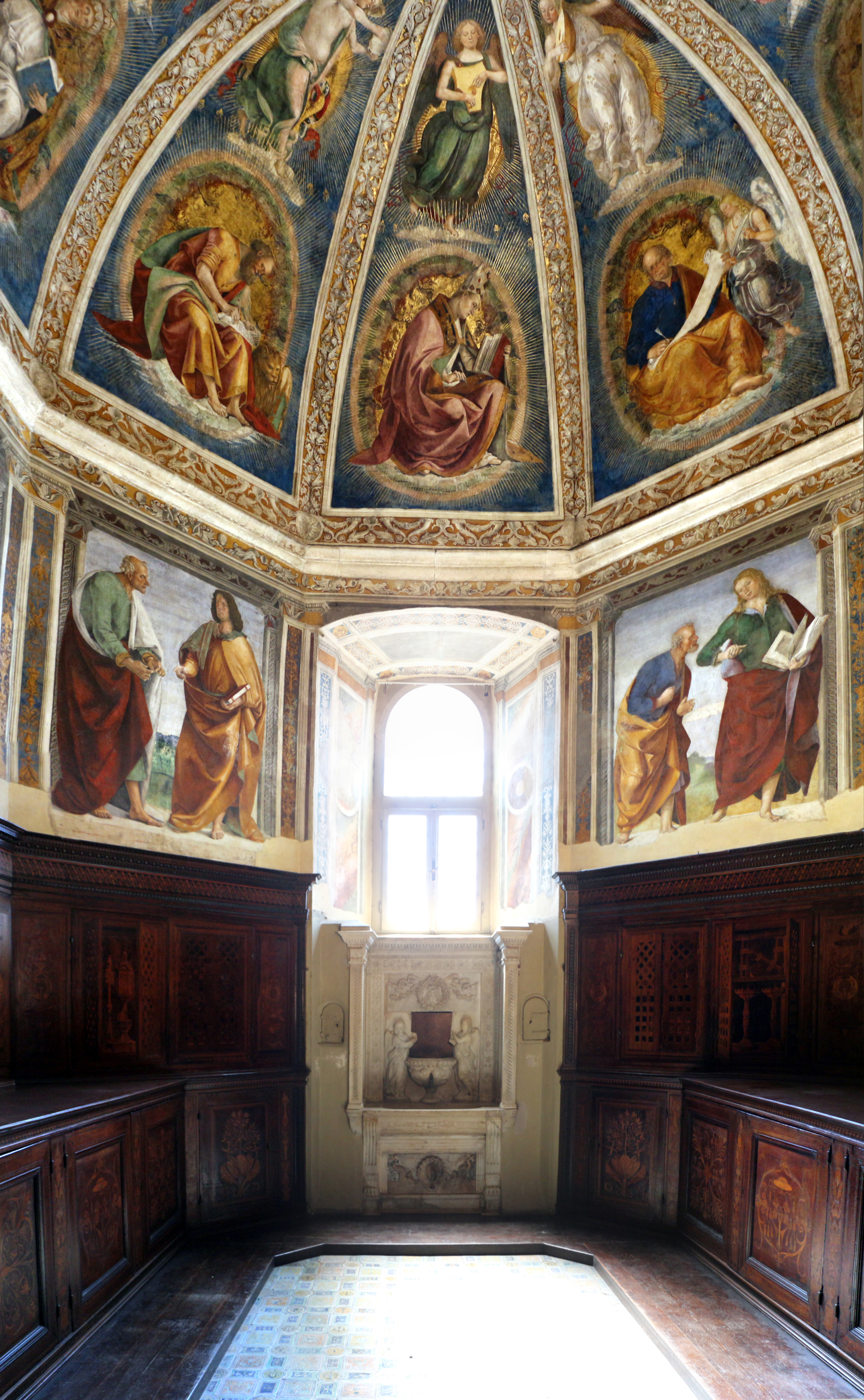
The sacristy

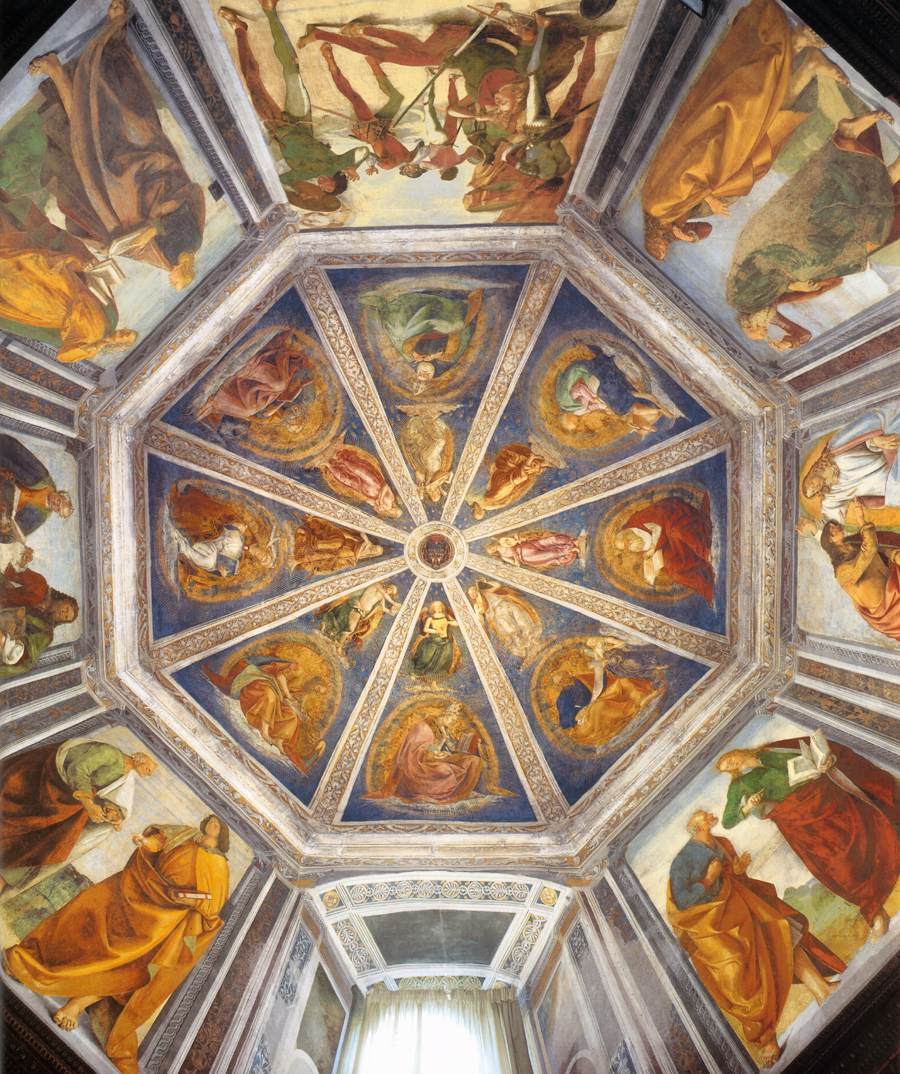
The vault

The San Giovanni Sacristy (Italian: Sagrestia di San Giovanni or Sagrestia della Cura) is one of four sacristies of the Basilica della Santa Casa in Loreto, located between the church's transepts. Octagonal in plan, the sacristy is decorated with a 1477–1480 fresco cycle by Luca Signorelli.

== History ==
The sacristy was decorated sometime in the second half of the 1470s through a commission by Girolamo Basso della Rovere, who ruled Loreto from 1476 to 1506 and was made a cardinal in 1477. His coat of arms is shown in the centre of the vault.

The commission was entrusted to the young Luca Signorelli, who was already well known in the Marche as one of the better students of Piero della Francesca and capable of synthesizing the multiple artistic influences in central Italy at that time. He was assisted by Pietro Dei and, according to some critics, Pietro Perugino. Some scholars believe the frescoes were completed after the Sistine Chapel, around 1485.

== Description ==
The sacristy, like its twin dedicated to the Four Evangelists, uses an octagonal plan. Its Renaissance portal, carved and inlaid, is attributed to Benedetto da Maiano.

The vault, in eight segments, is decorated by a spiral of eight angel musicians, followed by the four Evangelists and Doctors of the Church, alternating. The Saint Ambrosios, Saint Matthew and his corresponding angel, and the angel above Saint Jerome stand out as works probably executed by Signorelli himself.

On the upper-part of the walls, there are scenes of the Conversion of Saint Paul on the Way to Damascus and the Doubting of Saint Thomas as well as five pairs of the Apostles. In the Saint Thomas fresco, Christ looks ruddy and plump, much like in Signorelli's Flagellation Standard.

The stylistic influences of the frescoes include Bramante, Perugino, and Andrea del Verrocchio (and his celebrated Christ and St. Thomas statue), as well as Bellini's Pesaro Altarpiece. The Conversion fresco in particular is characterized by its theatricality and drama, through its luminous appearance, that dazzles Saint Paul as his companions flee around him. Critic Scarpellini noted how the monumental apostolic figures stand around the spectator, giving the impression that they face a looming stage that "revolves" around them.

The lower sections of the walls are occupied by inlaid benches and wardrobes, the Renaissance works of Domenico di Antonio Indivini. They realized in two different workshops, one in Urbino and one locally, which was also active in the sacristy of Saint Luke. On the side of the window is a marble washbasin, which is also the work of Benedetto da Maiano. The floor is decorated with majolica tiles with fantastical figures that were made in the 19th century, based on 16th century models.

== Gallery ==
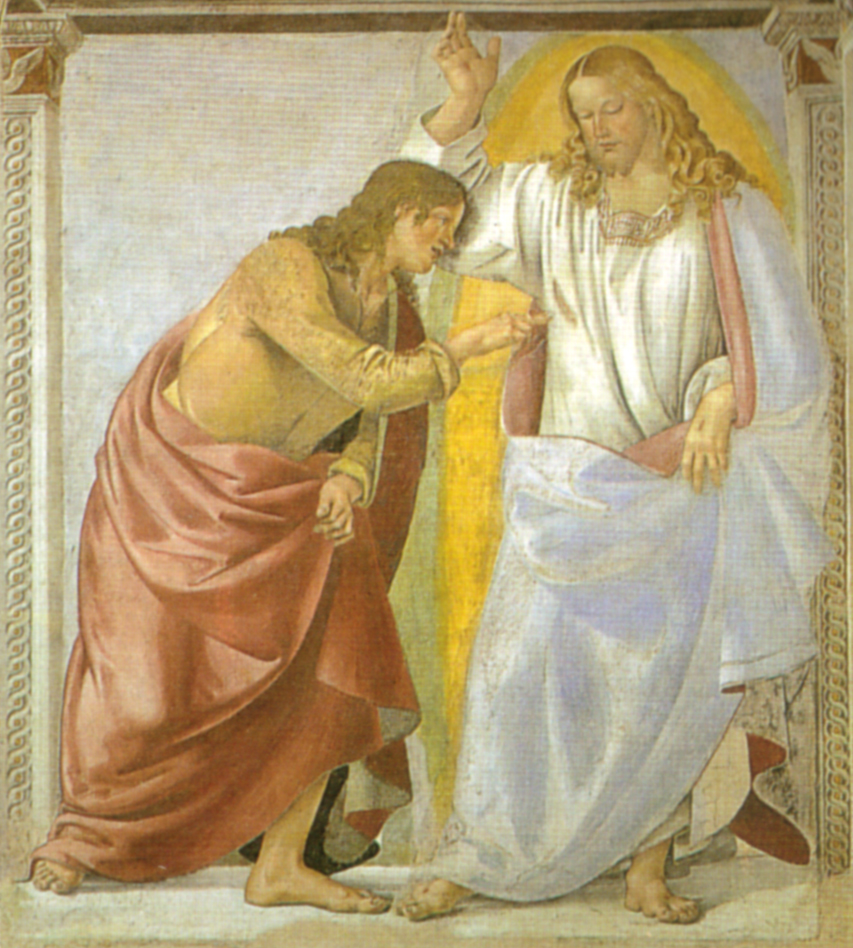
Incredulity of St Thomas

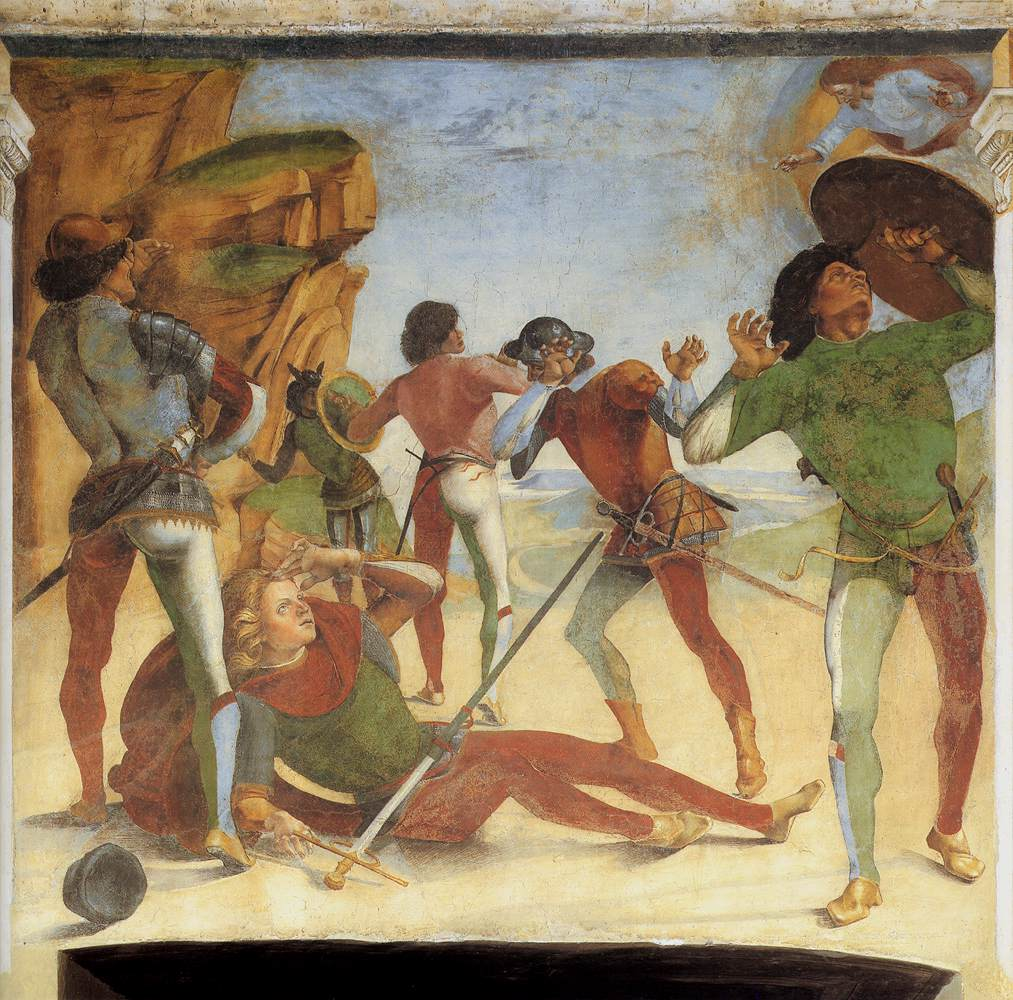
The Conversion of Paul on the Way to Damascus

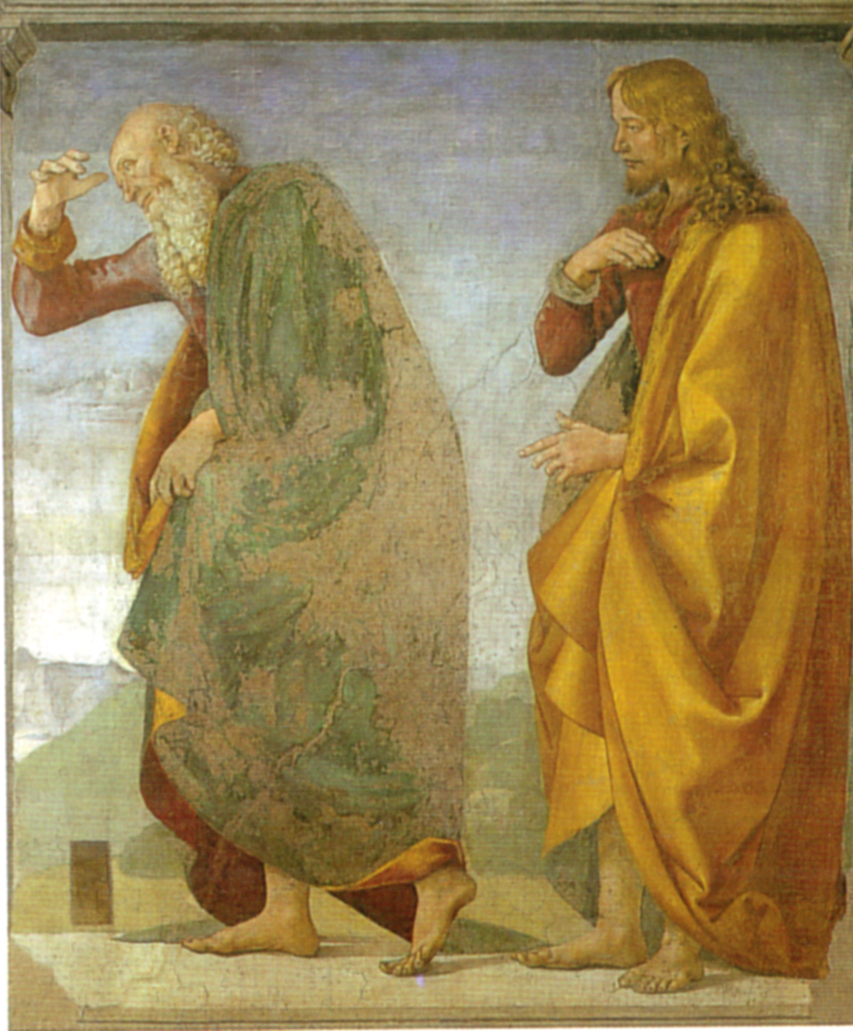
Two Apostles

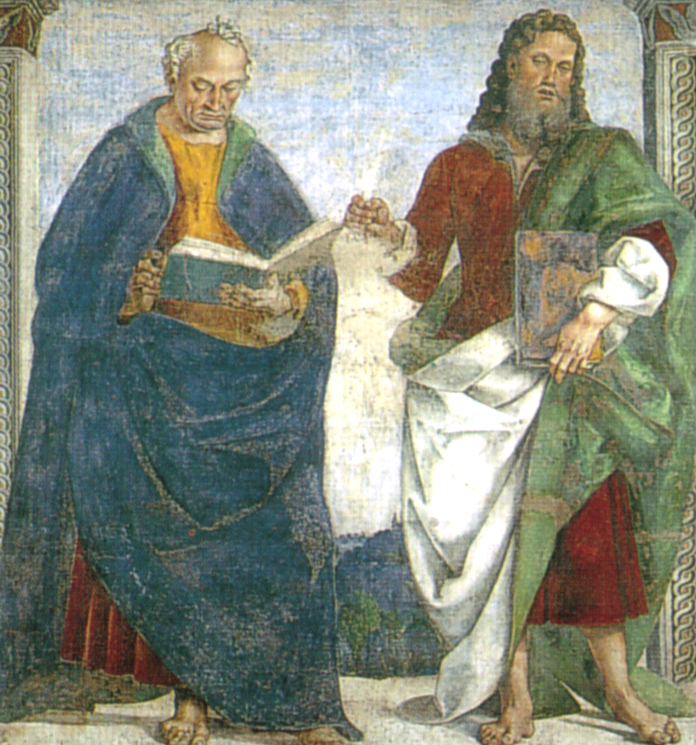
Two Apostles

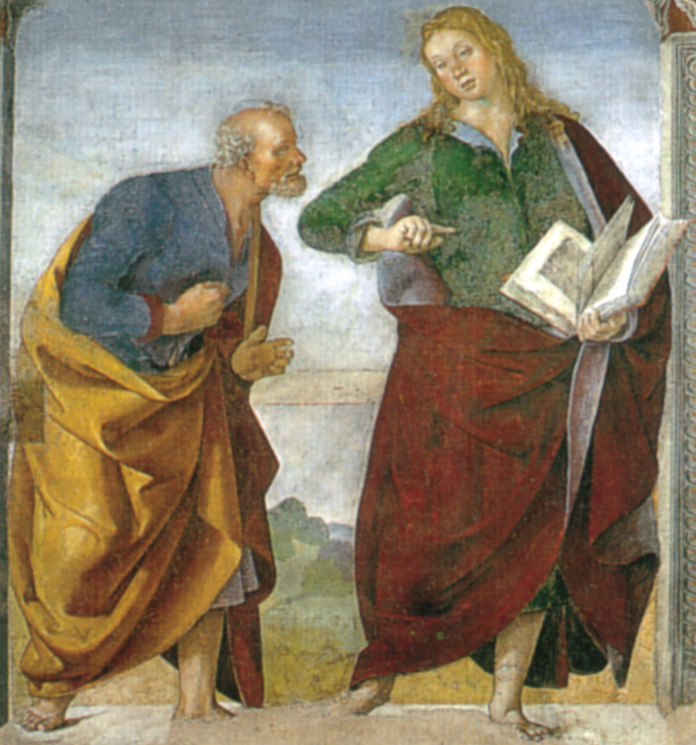
Two Apostles

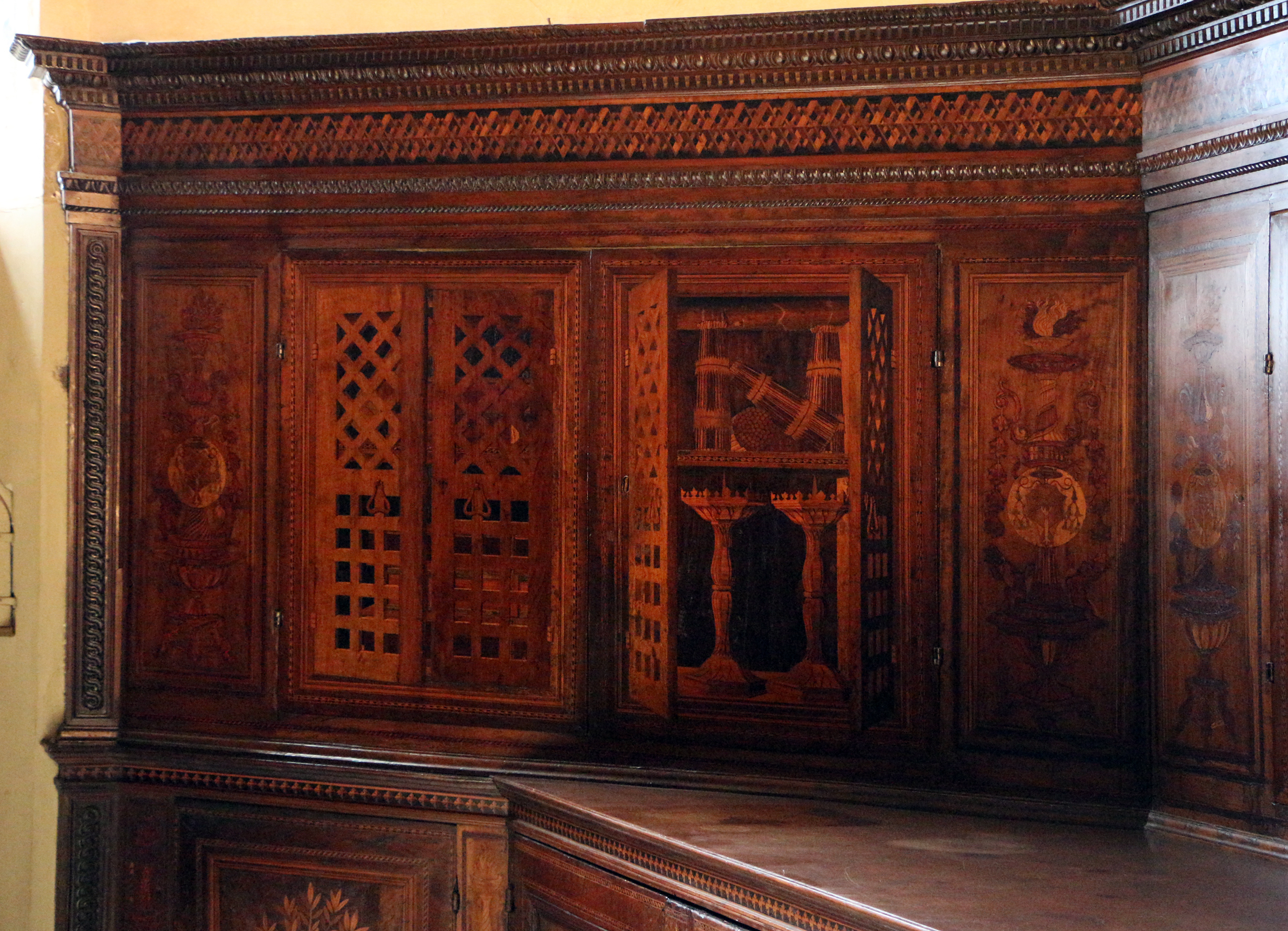
Wooden panels

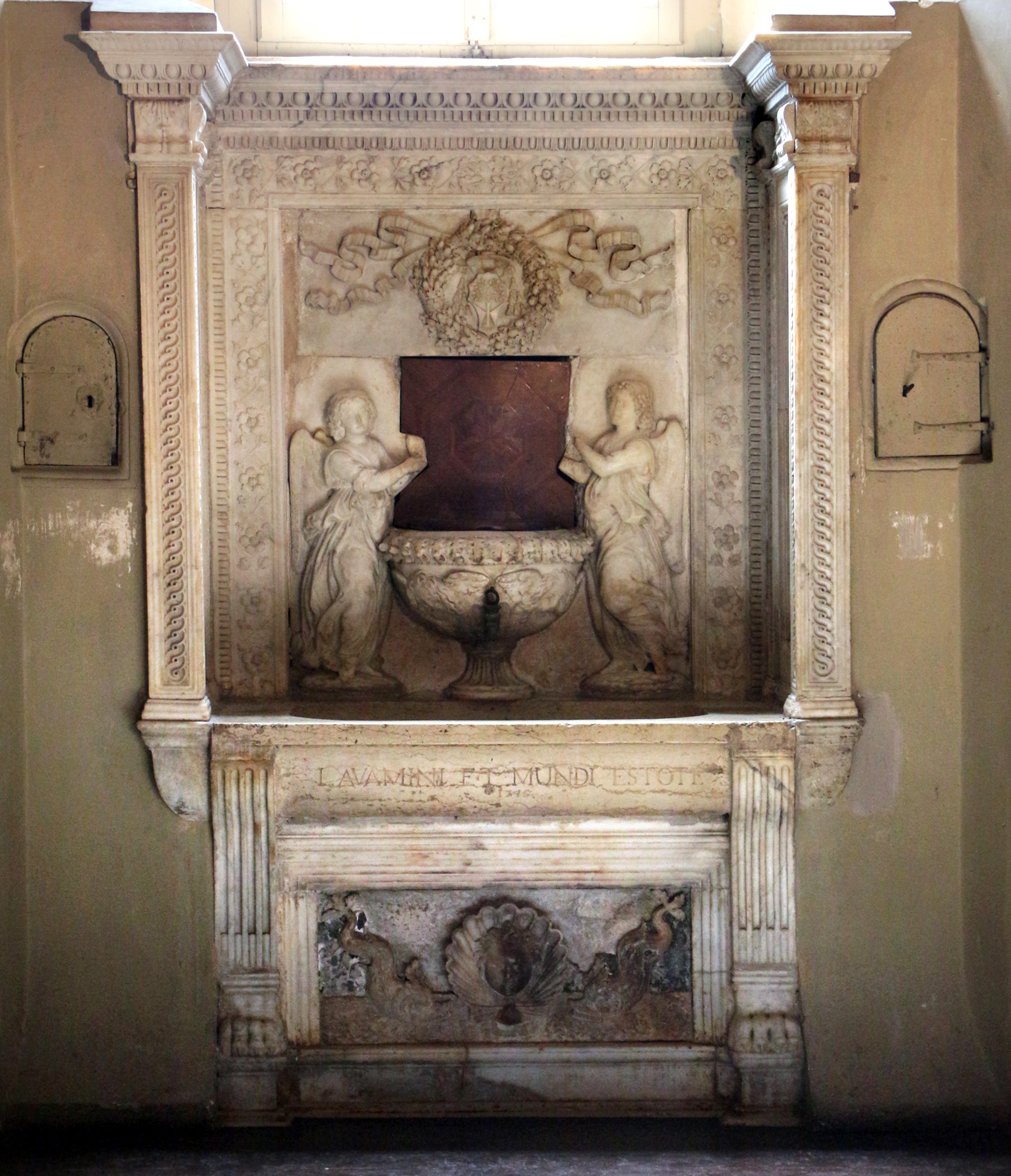
Washbasin by Benedetto da Maiano

== Bibliography ==
- Paolucci, Antonio (2004). "Luca Signorelli". Pittori del Rinascimento (in Italian). Florence: Scala. ISBN 88-8117-099-X.
- Marche : con 9 carte geografiche, 14 piante di città, 14 piante e schemi di edifici, 37 stemmi (in Italian) (4a ed.). Milano: Touring club italiano. 1979. ISBN 88-365-0013-7.
- Blasio, Silvia (2007). Marche e Toscana, terre di grandi maestri tra Quattro e Seicento. Florence: Pacini Editore.
- Zanchi, Mauro (2015). Signorelli (in Italian). Firenze: Giunti. ISBN 978-88-09-99420-1.
