= Giovanni Andrea Lazzarini =

Italian painter (1710–1801)

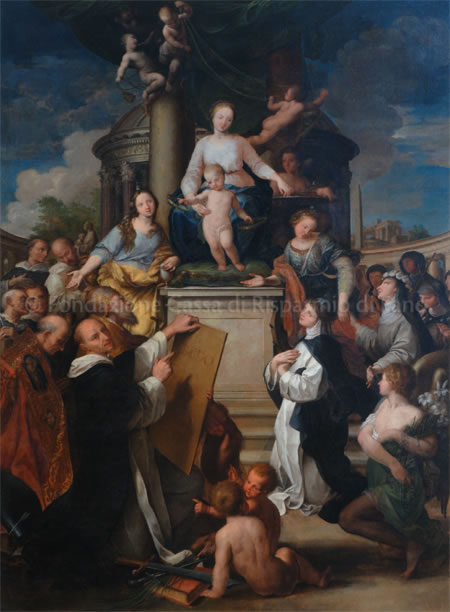
Virgin and Child, Pinacoteca San Domenico, Fano

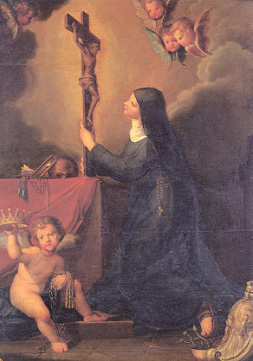
Beata Serafina in Prayer attributed to Lazzarini

Giovanni Andrea Lazzarini (19 November 1710 – 7 September 1801) was an Italian painter, poet, and art historian of the late-Baroque or Rococo.

He was born at Pesaro. He was instructed in painting by Francesco Mancini, and studied at Rome from 1734 to 1749, and worked subsequently at Venice and Forlì in a style recalling Carlo Cignani. He distinguished himself as a fresco-painter. He was, however, a better teacher than artist. He was erudite and wrote extensively including Descrizione della cupola d'Assisi, Catalogo ragionato delle pitture della chiesa di Pesaro, and a book on Pittura. He was a professor at the Academy of Pesaro from 1753.

Among his pupils were Pietro Marchioretto. His works were painted for Gualdo, near Rimini, and for the Cathedrals of Osimo, Foligno, Ancona, and Pesaro. He also painted for the church of Sant'Agostino in Pesaro. He died in Pesaro. The square outside the Teatro Rossini in Pesaro is named after him.

== Publications ==
- Lazzarini, Giovanni Andrea (1783) [1783]. Catalogo delle pitture che si conservano nelle chiese di Pesaro. Casa Gavelli. ISBN 978-5518934009.
