= Pesaro Altarpiece =

Pesaro Altarpiece may refer to:

- Pesaro Altarpiece (Bellini), c. 1471
- Pesaro Madonna, by Titian, c. 1519

== See also ==
- Frari Triptych, or Pesaro Triptych, by Bellini, c. 1488
