= Sant'Agostino, Pesaro =

Church building in Pesaro, Italy

Coordinates: 43°54′42.16″N 12°54′38.28″E

Sant'Agostino is a Roman Catholic church, originally founded in the 13th-century but refurbished in the following centuries, located on Corso XI Settembre in the historic center of Pesaro, region of Marche, Italy.

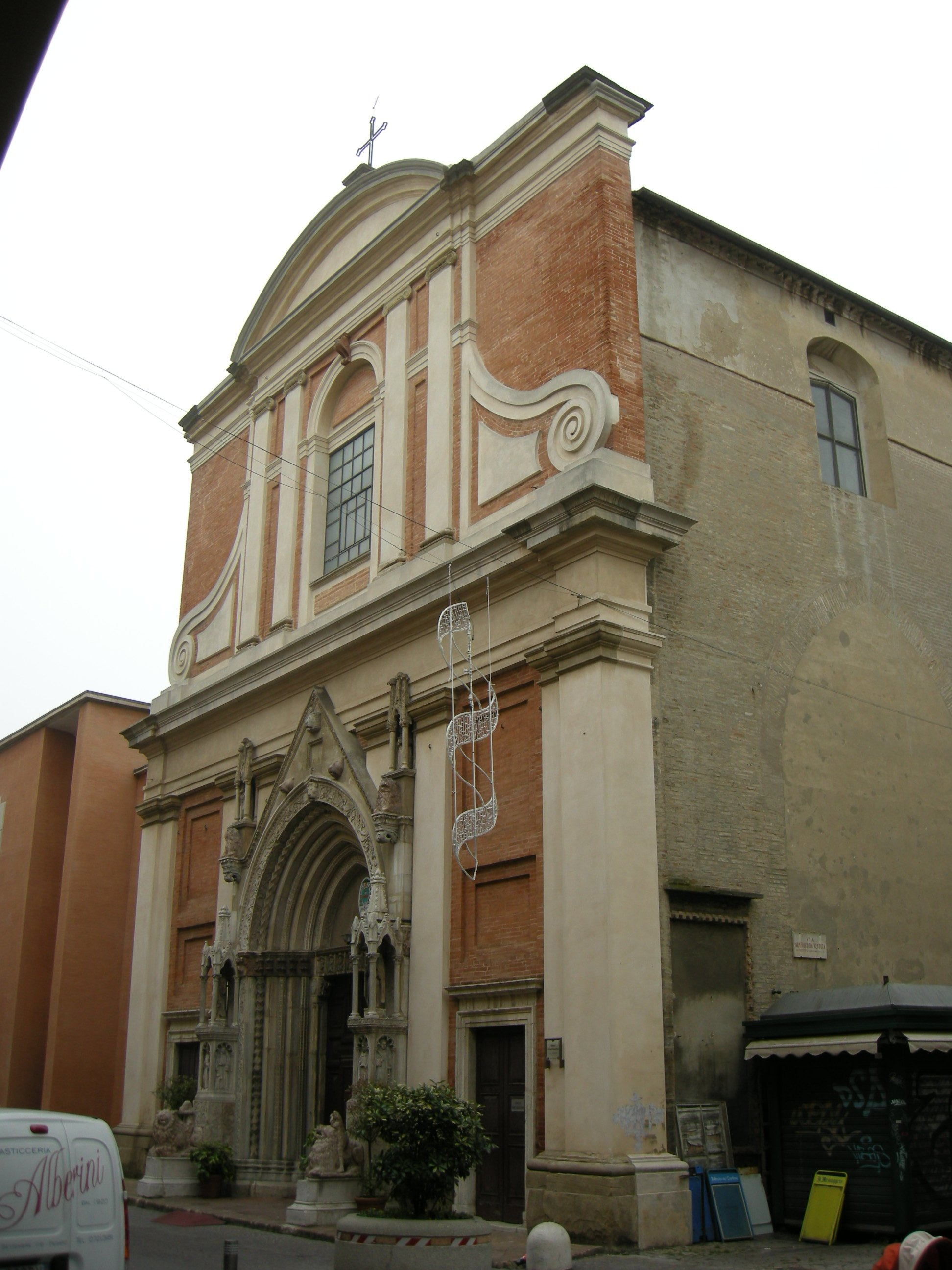
The facade of the church

== History ==
The eclectic facade has accumulated elements from refurbishments over the centuries. A church at this site was first built in 1258 in a romanesque-style; in 1282 it was assigned to the cloistered Augustinian monks. During the second half of the 14th century, the church was refurbished in a gothic style.

The elaborate ogival entrance portal was erected between 1398 and 1413, under the patronage of the Malatesta dei Sonetti. The iconography contains the lions of the Malatesta coat of arms. A further refurbishment occurred in the 18th century, surrounding the portal with a baroque facade.

The interior retains a 15th-century wooden choir with intarsia, likely built to celebrate the wedding in 1475 between Costanzo Sforza and Camilla d'Aragona. The 32 panels depict buildings restored in the territory by the Sforza.

The church has a number of oval portraits depicting blessed and holy Augustinians, including the blessed Guglielmo and blessed Antonio di Amandola, by Pietro Tedeschi. In addition, a Blessed Caterina da Pallanza, St Giovanni da San Facondo, a Blessed Andrea da Montereale and the Blessed Giuliana da Busto Arsizio are works by Carlo Magini.

The organ, recently restored, was a work of Gaetano Callido (1727-1813).

An inventory from 1864 lists the following artworks in the nave and flanking chapels:

- Enthroned Madonna and Child with Saints- an altarpiece painted attributed to either Gian-Giacomo Pandolfi or Giovanni Giacomo Palmerini.
- Virgin of the Annunciation with a Glory of Angels attributed to Giacomo Palma the Younger.
- Holy Trinity, Virgin, and Saints Lawrence and Augustine by Pietro Tedeschi, pupil of Gregorio Lazzarini.
- Madonna del Soccorso scattering the Devils tempting a Devout woman, also attributed to Pandolfi or Palmerini.
- Blessed Rita da Cassia genuflecting before a Crucifix by Simone Cantarini.
- St Nicolò da Tolentino intercedes for the Souls in Purgatory with God the Father in Heaven by Cristofano Roncalli.
- St Thomas of Villanova genuflects before a Vision of Heaven by P. Cesare Pronti, a pupil of Guercino.
- Virgin and Child venerated by St Augustine and other Saints, main altarpiece also by Cesare Pronti. The surrounding sculpture of the Crucifixion with the Magadalen, by Federico Brandano.
