= Head of Saint John the Baptist (Bellini) =

Painting by Giovanni Bellini

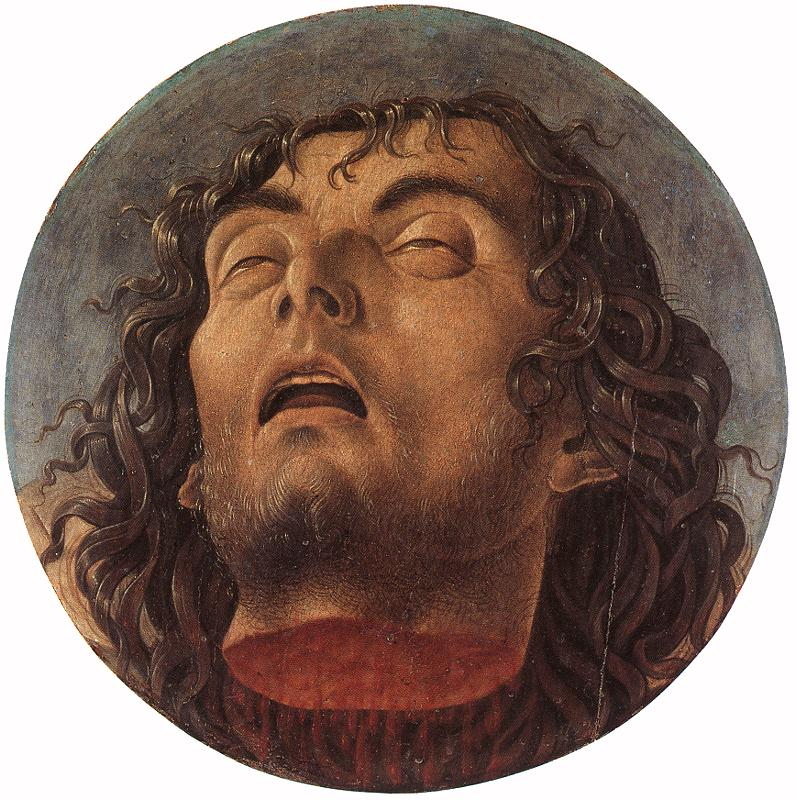
- Artist: Giovanni Bellini
- Year: 1465–1470
- Medium: Tempera on panel
- Dimensions: 28 cm diameter (11 in)
- Location: Civic Museum, Pesaro

The Head of Saint John the Baptist is a tondo painting by the Italian Renaissance master Giovanni Bellini. It is now housed in the Civic Museum of Pesaro.

The painting depicts the head of the Saint John the Baptist just after his decapitation, with blood still dripping from the neck. The perspective from below show the influence of the treatises about perspectival representation of the human figure which were being published at the time, such as Piero della Francesca's De prospectiva pingendi.

Stylistically, the brilliant colors and the dramatic painting are similar to those of the Saint Vincent Ferrer Altarpiece, the first mature work by Bellini, dated to after 1464.

== See also ==
- List of works by Giovanni Bellini

== Sources ==
- De Vecchi, Pierluigi; Elda Cerchiari (1999). I tempi dell'arte. Vol. 2. Milan: Bompiani. ISBN 88-451-7212-0.
- Bellini, Giovanni; Ghiotto, Renato; Pignatti, Terisio (1969). Giovanni Bellini: l'opera completa. Classici dell'arte (in Italian). Milan: Rizzoli. OCLC 1091966285.
- Lucco, Mauro (2019). Giovanni Bellini: catalogo ragionato (in Italian). Ponzano Veneto: ZeL edizioni. ISBN 978-88-87186-81-9.
- "Testa di san Giovanni Battista". Cultura. Regione Marche (in Italian). Archived from the original on 8 March 2023.
