= Cesare Pronti =

Italian painter (1626–1708)

- Cesare Pronti, Madonna and Child in Glory with Saints, Ravenna Art Museum
- Born: 30 November 1626; Cattolica, near Rimini, Papal States
- Died: 22 October 1708 (aged 81); Rimini, Papal States
- Other name: Padre Cesare da Ravenna
- Education: Guercino
- Known for: Painting
- Movement: Baroque

Cesare Pronti, also known as Padre Cesare da Ravenna (30 November 1626 – 22 October 1708), was an Italian painter of the Baroque period, active mainly near Ravenna.

== Biography ==
Cesare Pronti was born at Cattolica, near Rimini, and was brought up at Bologna, where he trained under Guercino. Around 1684 he helped complete the quadrature for the Villa Albizzi in Bologna, working with Carlo Cignani. He then moved to Rimini, where he entered the Augustinian Order. Upon completing his novitiate, he returned to Bologna to continue his artistic training under Guercino; he eventually settled permanently in the Augustinian convent of Ravenna, becoming known as Padre Cesare da Ravenna. In Ravenna he carried out several commissions, both for his order and for private patrons.

Around 1687, he created a narrative cycle of twenty-six paintings for the now-lost church of the Confraternity of Saint Jerome in Rimini, each depicting an episode from the life of the patron saint. The scenes are executed entirely in monochrome or near-monochrome and feature a reddish hue, perhaps intended to evoke the color of copper. Pronti helped decorate with a mix of quadratura and allegorical figures representing the four known continents the Rasponi family's palace, Palazzo di San Giacomo, near Russi. He also helped decorate, with oculi with flying putti, the former church of San Romualdo, now a museum in Classe (in the Biblioteca Classense), and formerly a Camaldolese abbey.

In his later life he principally engaged in painting altarpieces for the churches of his Order, of which one of the best is the altarpiece depicting St. Thomas of Villanova for Sant'Agostino, Pesaro. He died at Ravenna on 22 October 1708, aged 81.

== Gallery ==
Cesare Pronti, Samson and Delilah

The Blessed Bernardo Tolomei

The Deposition of Christ

St. Jerome and the Lion

== Bibliography ==
- Bryan, Michael (1889). Walter Armstrong; Robert Edmund Graves (eds.). Dictionary of Painters and Engravers, Biographical and Critical. Vol. II L-Z. London: George Bell and Sons. p. 325.
- Foschi, Umberto (1997). "Il pittore guercinesco Cesare Pronti (1626–1708)". Ravenna Studi e Ricerche. IV (1): 41–67.
- "Bacciocchi, Cesare (Fra) or Baciocchi". Benezit Dictionary of Artists. Oxford: Oxford University Press. 2011. doi:10.1093/benz/9780199773787.article.B00009495.
- Alessandro Giovanardi, ed. (2021). Cesare Pronti da Cattolica (1626-1708), Un omaggio in quattro atti. Exh. cat. Rimini: Pazzini Editori. ISBN 978-88-6257-393-1.
