= Costanzo II Sforza =

Giovanni Maria Sforza (Gradara, 24 February 1510 – 1512), also known as Costanzo II, was the Lord of Pesaro from his father's death in 1510 until his own death at a young age in 1512.

He was the only son of Giovanni Sforza, Lord of Pesaro, and his third wife, Ginevra Tiepolo. Giovanni Sforza had been the first husband of Lucrezia Borgia, but their marriage was annulled in 1497 by her father, Pope Alexander VI, on the grounds of supposed non-consummation and the alleged impotence of the groom.

In 1504, Giovanni Sforza married Ginevra Tiepolo, a marriage that produced a male heir in 1510. However, Giovanni Maria became fatherless a few months after his birth, when his father died on 27 July 1510. Upon Giovanni Sforza's death, Giovanni Maria became the Lord of Pesaro, under the name of Costanzo II. Since he was an infant, his paternal uncle Galeazzo Sforza served as regent.

Costanzo II died in 1512, legally making the heir to his estate his paternal uncle. However, Pope Julius II decided to retain control over Pesaro, and he did not allow Galeazzo Sforza to be invested with the title. In this way, Costanzo II was effectively the last Sforza Lord of Pesaro. Pope Julius II then gave the title to his nephew, Francesco Maria I della Rovere, Duke of Urbino. Galeazzo Sforza married Ginevra, daughter of Ercole Bentivoglio and Barbara Torelli, on 4 August 1507, but had no children. On 12 March 1515, while returning from Parma to Milan together with Duke Massimiliano Sforza, he was hit by a shot from an arquebus rifle. He died from his wounds on 14 April.

Preceded by Giovanni Sforza	Lord of Pesaro; 1510–1512	Succeeded by Galeazzo Sforza, then Francesco Maria della Rovere
