= Giovanni Sforza =

Italian condottiero

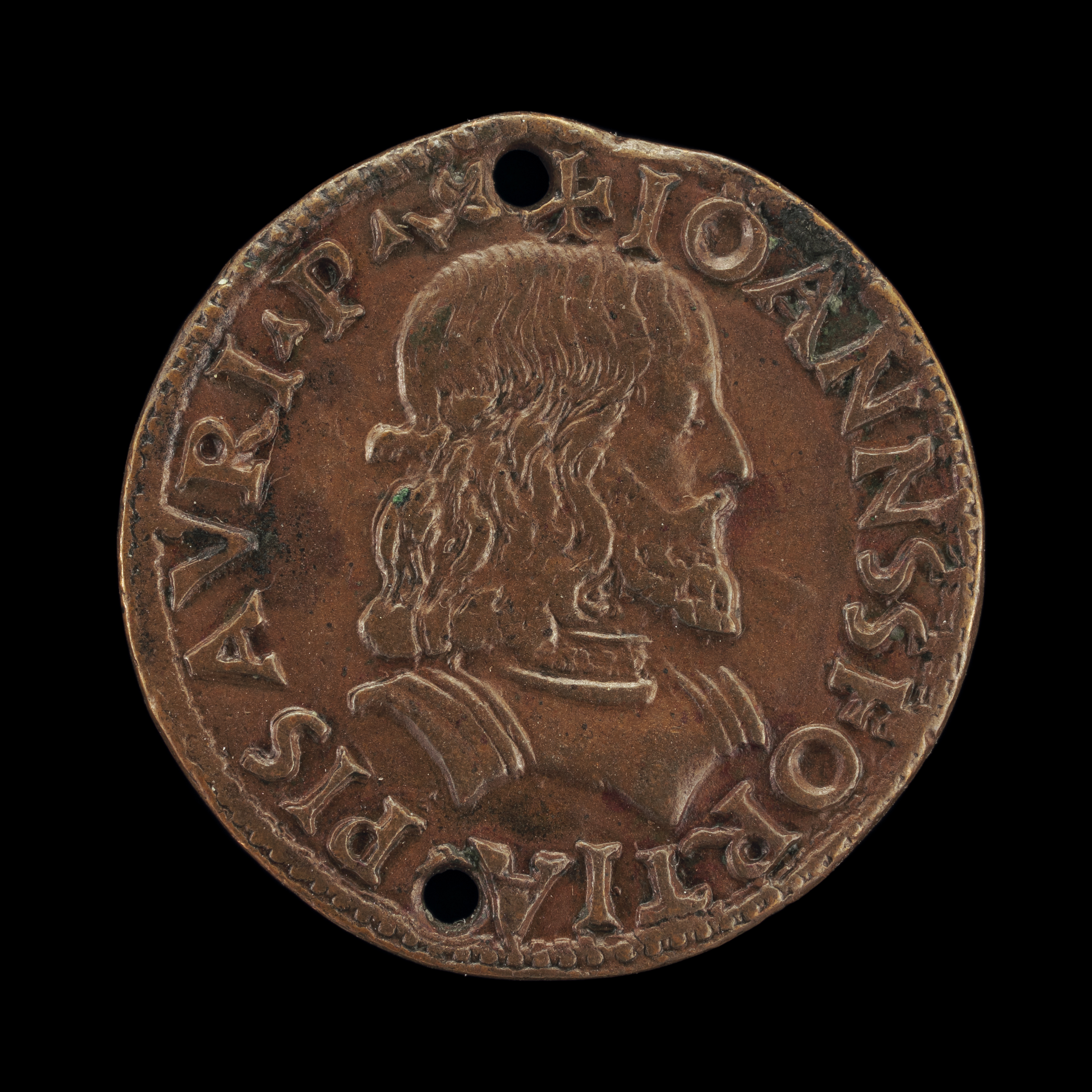
Giovanni Sforza, 1466–1510, Lord of Pesaro

Giovanni Sforza d'Aragona (5 July 1466 – 27 July 1510) was an Italian condottiero, lord of Pesaro and Gradara from 1483 until his death. He is best known as the first husband of Lucrezia Borgia. Their marriage was annulled on claims of his impotence in March 1497.

== Life and marriage ==
The illegitimate son of Costanzo I Sforza, he was a member of the powerful House of Sforza, in the line of Pesaro and Gradara (the Milanese line held the Duchy of Milan at the time). At the death of his father in 1483 he inherited the lordship of Pesaro and Gradara, though he was only seventeen and so the lordship was initially ruled by his father's widow Camilla d'Aragona as regent.

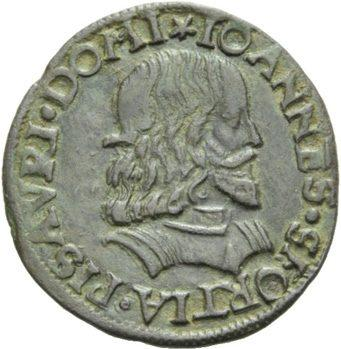
coin of the 16th century with the profile of Giovanni Sforza on it

In 1489 Giovanni had married Maddalena Gonzaga, daughter of Federico I of Mantua, but she died the following year. He was thus viewed as a valuable link to Milan by the Borgia family. With the help of Giovanni's cousin, Cardinal Ascanio Sforza, the family finalized marriage negotiations in February 1492 between Giovanni, then in his mid-twenties, and Lucrezia Borgia, the twelve-year-old illegitimate daughter of Pope Alexander VI. A proxy marriage took place on 12 June that year, as the wedding contract stipulated that Lucrezia would stay in Rome and not consummate the marriage for a year. Her dowry was 31,000 ducats. The official marriage was celebrated in the Vatican Palace in 1493, and reputedly was a lavish and decadent affair.

He and Lucrezia spent two years in Pesaro, during which his importance to the ambitious Borgia family dwindled. Sforza tried to wield his proximity to the Borgias to Milan's advantage by acting as a spy, and was found out by Alexander VI. Meanwhile, other political advantages (particularly with Naples) were formed, rendering the strategic marriage useless. Lucrezia, used to privileged life in the Papal court, did not adjust to the provincial atmosphere of Pesaro. By Christmas 1495, both Giovanni and Lucrezia were present again in the court at Rome.

By then, Sforza was aware that his fortune was precarious. He left Rome to continue with a military campaign, and upon his return in February 1497 quickly fled the city in disguise.

== Annulment and late life ==
The Pope petitioned for an annulment on Lucrezia's behalf in 1497 (divorce not being permitted in the Catholic Church). Ascanio Sforza was again called in to mediate between his cousin and the Borgias, and tried to persuade Giovanni into accepting the annulment. Giovanni refused to do so on at least two grounds: first, he would have to return Lucrezia's sizable dowry, and second, doing so would require signing a paper stating he was impotent. Some sources state that Giovanni had married and even fathered illegitimate children before his union with Lucrezia, which is reasonable given his age. If those sources are correct, he was not always impotent but may have later become so.

Sforza accused Lucrezia of parental and fraternal incest in response. This claim, first made solely against the Pope and later extended to all of Lucrezia's brothers, still continues to shade the family's history. It became a popular example of the depravity later attributed to the family despite its lack of verifiability.

The marriage was eventually annulled in 1497 on grounds of non-consummation. The Sforza family had by then threatened to withhold protection to Giovanni if he did not comply with the offer, which allowed him to keep the dowry but still required signing the confirmation of impotence. Sforza agreed to the terms in March or December. Six months later he provided sworn testimony that Lucrezia was a virgin. Lucrezia was by then allegedly pregnant with the Roman Infante, whose parentage was cited by some as proof of incest between her and Cesare. It is certain that Sforza did not parent the child but details beyond that are uncertain.

Giovanni was excommunicated in 1500 and the citizens of one of his cities attempted to kill him. He was also attacked by Cesare Borgia, who aimed to gain Sforza's lands, and was forced to abandon Pesaro. He sued in vain for help to all the major powers of the time including France and the Holy Roman Empire. Giovanni Sforza could return to Pesaro only after the death of Alexander VI and the illness of Cesare Borgia (1503). The following year the new Pope, Julius II, confirmed him as vicariate in Pesaro.

He remarried to Ginevra Tiepolo, who gave him two sons, Ascanio (4 November 1505 – 24 November 1507) and Costanzo II (1510 – 1512), who succeeded him in Pesaro and Gradara. He had also two natural daughters: Battista (died in 1505) and Isabella (1503 – 1561), who married on 18 August 1520 Cipriano Sernigi (died in 1532, killed by Ottaviano Lampugnani) and in 1534 Francesco Carminati, son of Cecilia Gallerani, but the marriage was declared nullius for "spiritual relative".

Sforza died in Pesaro in 1510 at the age of 44.

== Portrayals in media ==
- In the 1981 BBC mini-series, The Borgias, Giovanni was played by British Actor Mark Buffery. In this adaptation, Giovanni is depicted as very timid and meek.
- In the 2011 Showtime series The Borgias, Giovanni was played by British actor Ronan Vibert. In this series, Giovanni is portrayed as being very brutish and cruel. In fact, he actually rapes Lucrezia on their wedding night and continues to sexually abuse her until she engineers an accident in which he breaks his leg. After his marriage is annulled, he is humiliated, and eventually is killed by Lucrezia's brother Cesare.
- In the 2011 French-German series Borgia, Giovanni was played by Austrian actor Manuel Rubey. This series' Giovanni is portrayed in a very similar manner to the Giovanni portrayed in the BBC miniseries, although he is not as meek and was for the most part very friendly towards Lucrezia. He even attempts to defy the Pope's orders against consummating his marriage to Lucrezia, but when he and Lucrezia finally have a chance to sleep together, he has difficulty performing, which leads to Lucrezia wanting an annulment from her father. Giovanni appears again briefly in the second season, where he and Lucrezia's future third husband Alfonso d'Este are shown marrying Ginevra Gonzaga (who is actually a composite character of Giovanni's first wife Maddalena Gonzaga and his third wife Ginevra Tiepolo) and Annamaria Sforza respectively in a double wedding ceremony. Afterwards, he unsuccessfully tries to woo Lucrezia for her love again, but she rebuffs him and orders him to go back to his wife.

== Bibliography ==
- Francesco Ambrogiani. Vita di Giovanni Sforza: (1466–1510). // Società pesarese di studi storici, 2009 – Pesaro (Italy) – 437 pages

| Preceded by Costanzo I Sforza | Lord of Pesaro; 1482–1500 | Succeeded by Cesare Borgia |
| Preceded by Cesare Borgia | Lord of Pesaro; 1503–1510 | Succeeded by Costanzo II Sforza |
