= Flagellation Standard =

Two-sided painting by Luca Signorelli

The Flagellation Standard (Italian - Stendardo della Flagellazione) was a double-sided tempera on panel painting by Luca Signorelli, signed "LUCE CORTONENSIS". Its stylistic similarities to Piero della Francesca date it to 1475, during Signorelli's first stay in Marche. Several historians consider it to be his earliest surviving work.

The work was painted for the Confraternita dei Raccomandati di Santa Maria del Mercato in Fabriano, whose church is now destroyed. The two sides were separated and the work's frame removed sometime before 1811, with one showing the Flagellation of Christ and the other Nursing Madonna in Glory. Both sides are now in the Pinacoteca di Brera in Milan, to which they were brought in 1811 after the church's suppression.

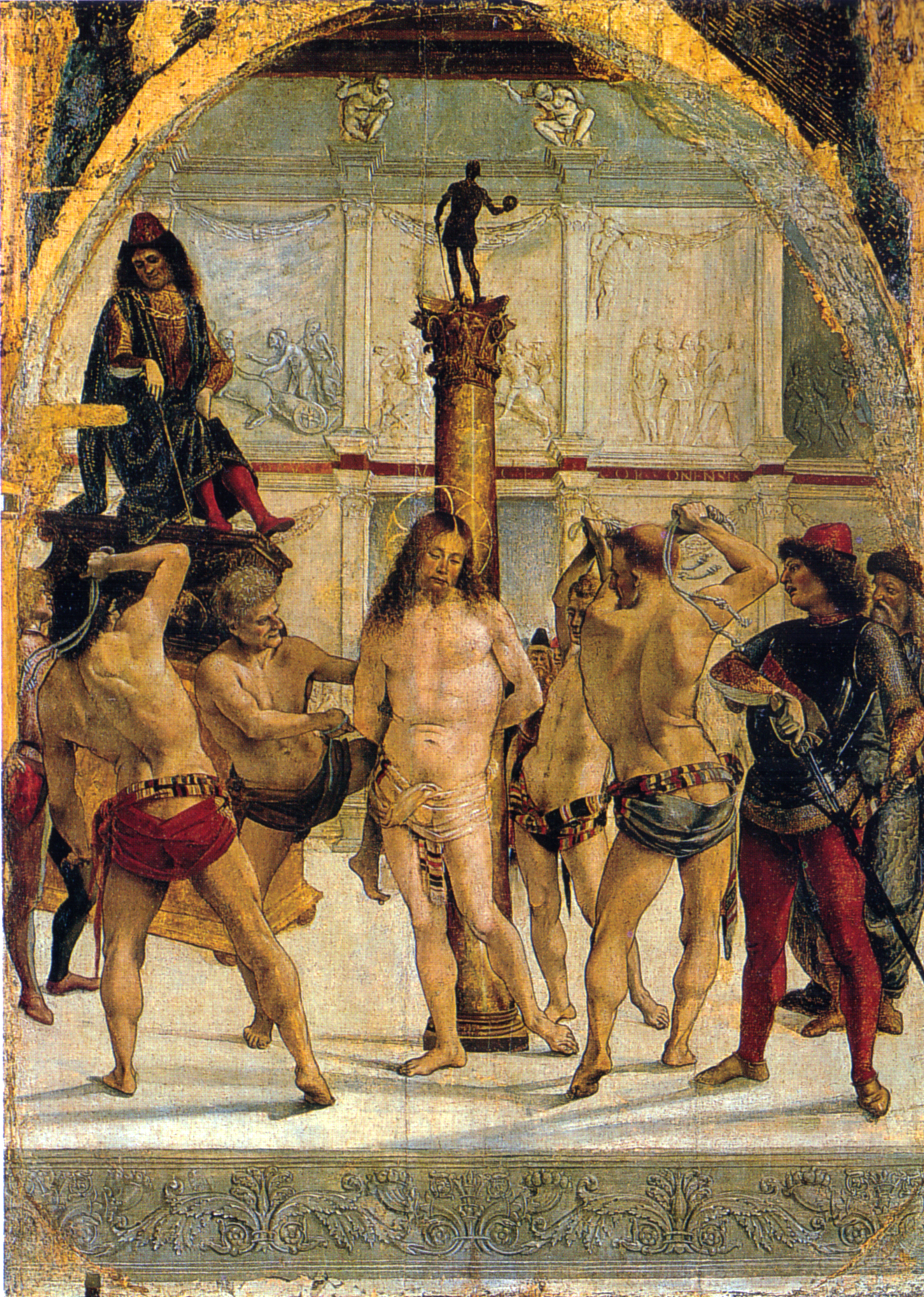
Flagellation

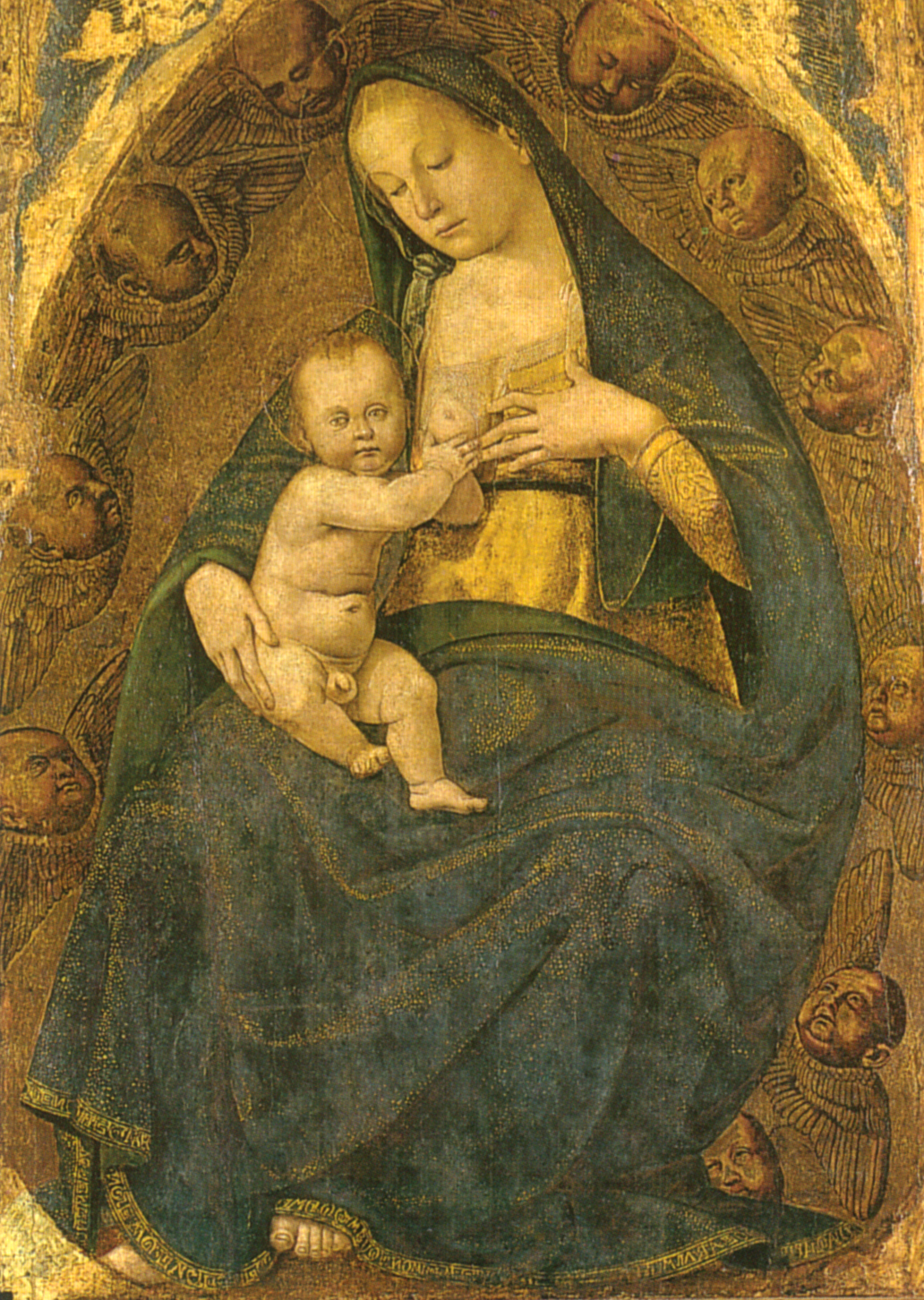
Nursing Madonna in Glory
