= Gianfrancesco Enzola =

Italian medallist

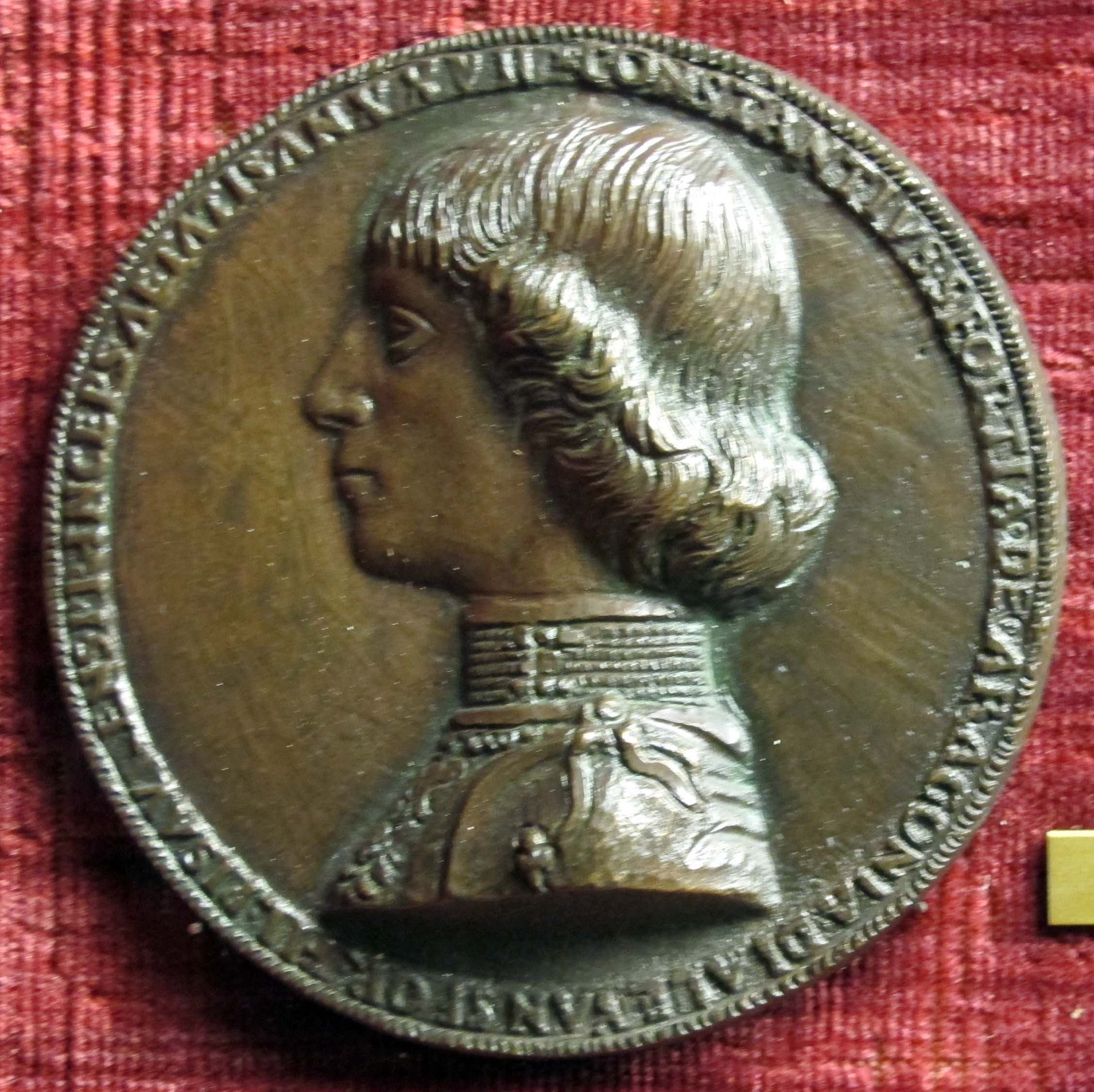
An Enzola medal of Costanzo Sforza, Lord of Pesaro

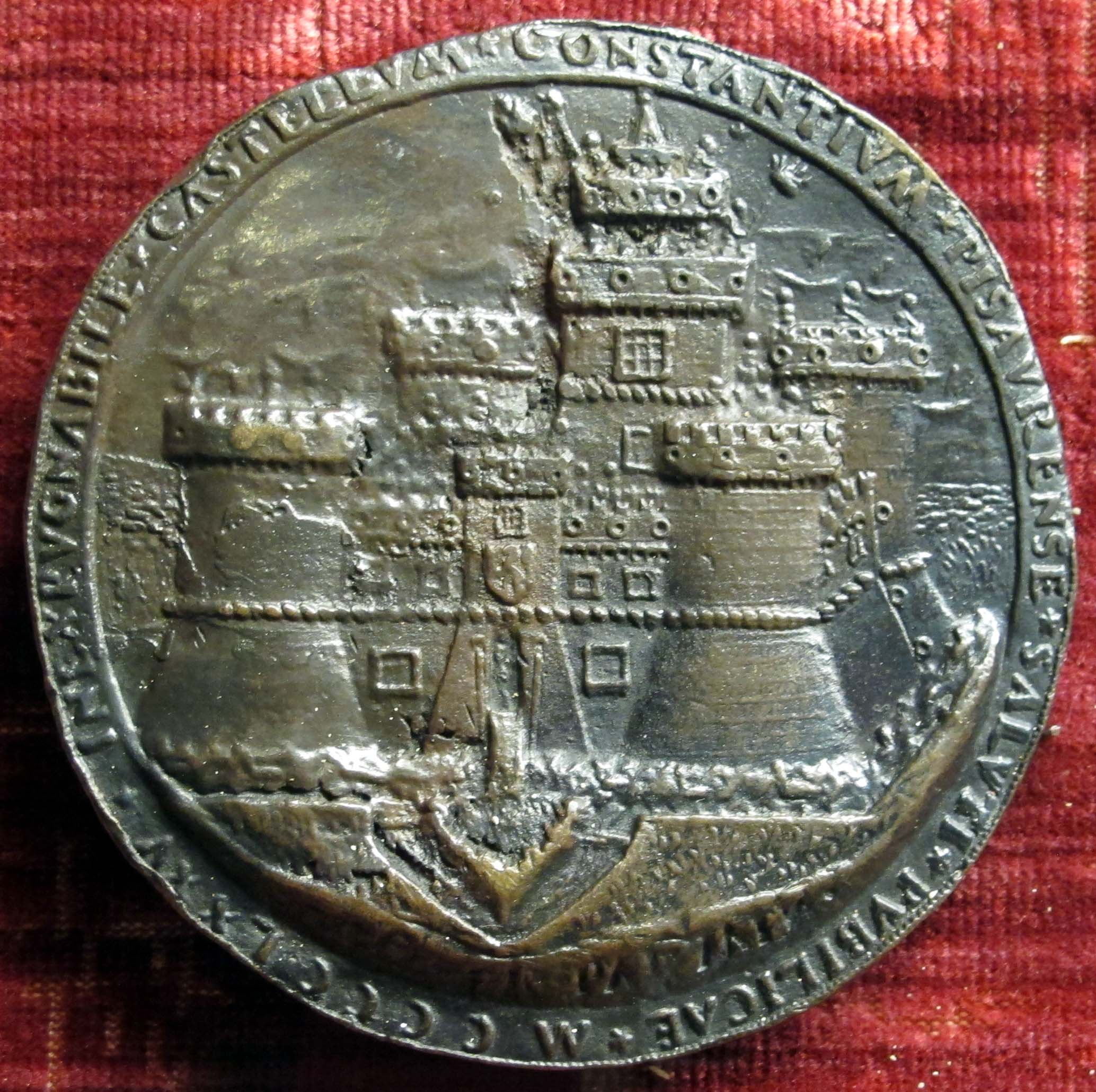
Verso of the same medal, showing Pesaro Castle

Gianfrancesco Enzola (c.1430, Parma - c.1513) was an Italian medallist, known as il Parmense (the man from Parma).

== Life ==
He was a son of Luca Enzola, a goldsmith, medallist and mint official in Parma, active between 1455 (when he designed a medal of Pier Maria II de' Rossi, count of Berceto) and 1478 (when he designed a medal of Federico da Montefeltro). Gianfrancesco was trained in his father's studio and by the goldsmith Alessandro da Parma and his son Pietro da Parma, who were active in work for Padua's Basilica of Saint Anthony of Padua.

His first phase lasted from around 1455 to around 1471. It was marked by early attempts to move from casting to minting to produce medals. He and the Venetian Vittore Gambello spearheaded this development. Enzola's early medals are rudimentary, cutting straight into the metal of the small 4 cm diameter negative-matrices from which they would be struck, similar to those already used for coins. This phase included his series for count Pier Maria II de' Rossi and his mistress Bianca Pellegrini, medals for Francesco Sforza and single medals for Cecco Ordelaffi, lord of Forlì (1457) and Taddeo Manfredi, lord of Faenza (1461). They were inspired by the tradition established by Pisanello, showing humanist profile portraits on the recto and a related heraldic or allegoriccal scene on the verso. Their relief was usually very crushed and slightly unclear.

From 1472 to 1473 he was master of the mint at Ferrara. He was not confident in producing medals using coining and so abandoned it in favour of casting. This improved the quality of his medals and increased their level of relief. This second phase from around 1474 to around 1478 included his series for Costanzo I Sforza (1474, 1475, 1478 and other undated examples), considered to be his masterpieces. He also produced several small plaques, a signed seal design for the city of Parma and other unsigned seal designs. His career culminated with a 9.28 cm diameter medal of the condottiero Federico da Montefeltro, known via a two-sided reproduction on the small leather tondoes in the Biblioteca apostolica vaticana.
