= Pietro Marchioretto =

Italian painter

Pietro Marchioretto (1763 or 1772 – 20 May 1828) was an Italian painter and engraver, mainly of rural landscapes, in a late Baroque style.

== Biography ==
He was born in Lamon, Feltre. Against his parents' wishes, he decided against farming, and at the age of 13 he sought work in painting. He traveled to Bassano and Castelfranco. But while working in the estate of Pietro Ciuran, he came to the attention of Giovanni Battista Lazzarini (1712-1791), During his career, he traveled through Veneto and Lombardy, Germany, Tyrol, and even Russia. He returned to Valsugana, he married Elizabeth Franceschi Telve, and continued to paint locally. Among his pupils was Francesco Cancitsk.
