= House of Sforza =

Noble family of the Italian Renaissance, dukes of Milan

Sforza
- Country: Duchy of Milan; Golden Ambrosian Republic
- Founded: 1411; 615 years ago
- Founder: Muzio Attendolo Sforza
- Final ruler: Milan: Francesco II (1535; 491 years ago) Pesaro: Galeazzo Sforza (1512; 514 years ago)
- Titles: Duke of Milan; Cadet branches: Prince of Gengazano; Duke of Bari; Duke of Onano; Marquess of Castell'Arquato; Marquess of Caravaggio; Count of Celano; Count of Borgonovo; Count of Santa Fiora; Lord of Pesaro
- Estates: Milan, Pesaro, Gradara
- Cadet branches: House of Sforza-Pesaro (extinct in 1515; 511 years ago); House of Sforza-Cotignola (extinct in 1624; 402 years ago)

The House of Sforza (Italian: [ˈsfɔrtsa]) was a ruling family of Renaissance Italy, based in Milan. Sforza rule began with the family's acquisition of the Duchy of Milan following the extinction of the Visconti family in the mid-15th century and ended with the death of the last member of the family's main branch, Francesco II Sforza, in 1535.

== History ==
The first son of Muzio Attendolo Sforza, Francesco I Sforza, married Bianca Maria Visconti (1425–1468) in 1441. She was the daughter and only heir of the last Duke of Milan, Filippo Maria Visconti. After overthrowing the Ambrosian Republic, Sforza then acquired the title of Duke of Milan (1450–1466), ruled Milan for 16 years, and made the Sforzas the heirs of the house of Visconti.

The family also held the seigniory of Pesaro, starting with Muzio Attendolo's second son, Alessandro (1409–1473). The Sforza held Pesaro until 1512, after the death of Costanzo II Sforza.

Muzio's third son, Bosio (1411–1476), founded the branch of Santa Fiora, who held the title of count of Cotignola; the Sforza ruled the small county of Santa Fiora in southern Tuscany until 1624. Members of this family also held important ecclesiastical and political positions in the Papal States, and moved to Rome in 1674, taking the name of Sforza Cesarini.

The Sforza became allied with the Borgia family through the arranged marriage (1493–1497) between Lucrezia Borgia and Giovanni (the illegitimate son of Costanzo I of Pesaro). This alliance failed, as the Borgia family annulled the marriage once the Sforza family were no longer needed.

In 1499, in the course of the Italian Wars, the army of Louis XII of France took Milan from Ludovico Sforza.

After Imperial German troops drove out the French, Maximilian Sforza, son of Ludovico, became Duke of Milan (1512–1515) until the French returned under Francis I of France and imprisoned him.

In 1521 Charles V drove out the French and restored the younger son of Ludovico, Francesco II Sforza to the duchy, after Francesco waged war on the Emperor. Francesco remained the ruler of Milan until his death in 1535 and as he was childless the Duchy reverted to the Emperor, who passed it to his son Philip II in 1540, thus beginning the period of Spanish rule in Milan.

== Sforza rulers of the Duchy of Milan ==
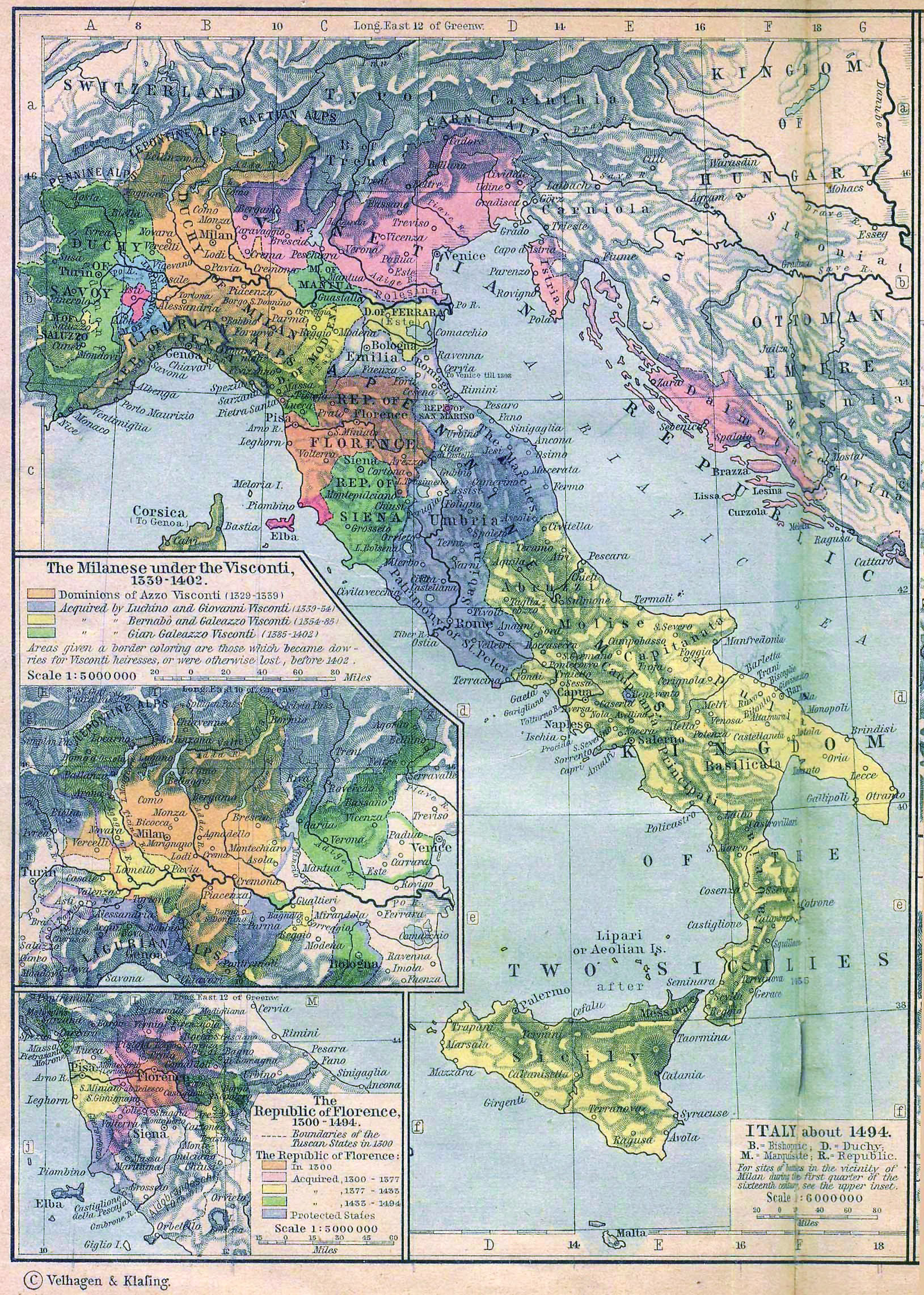
Map of Italy in 1494. Insert shows the Duchy of Milan ruled by the Visconti family and inherited by the Sforzas.

- Francesco I, 1450–1466
- Galeazzo Maria, 1466–1476
- Gian Galeazzo, 1476–1494
- Ludovico, 1494–1499
- Massimiliano, 1513–1515
- Francesco II, 1521–1535

== Sforza rulers of Pesaro and Gradara ==
- Alessandro, 1445–1473
- Costanzo I, 1473–1483
- Giovanni, 1483–1500 and 1503–1510
- Costanzo II, 1510–1512
- Galeazzo, 1512

== Sforza family tree ==
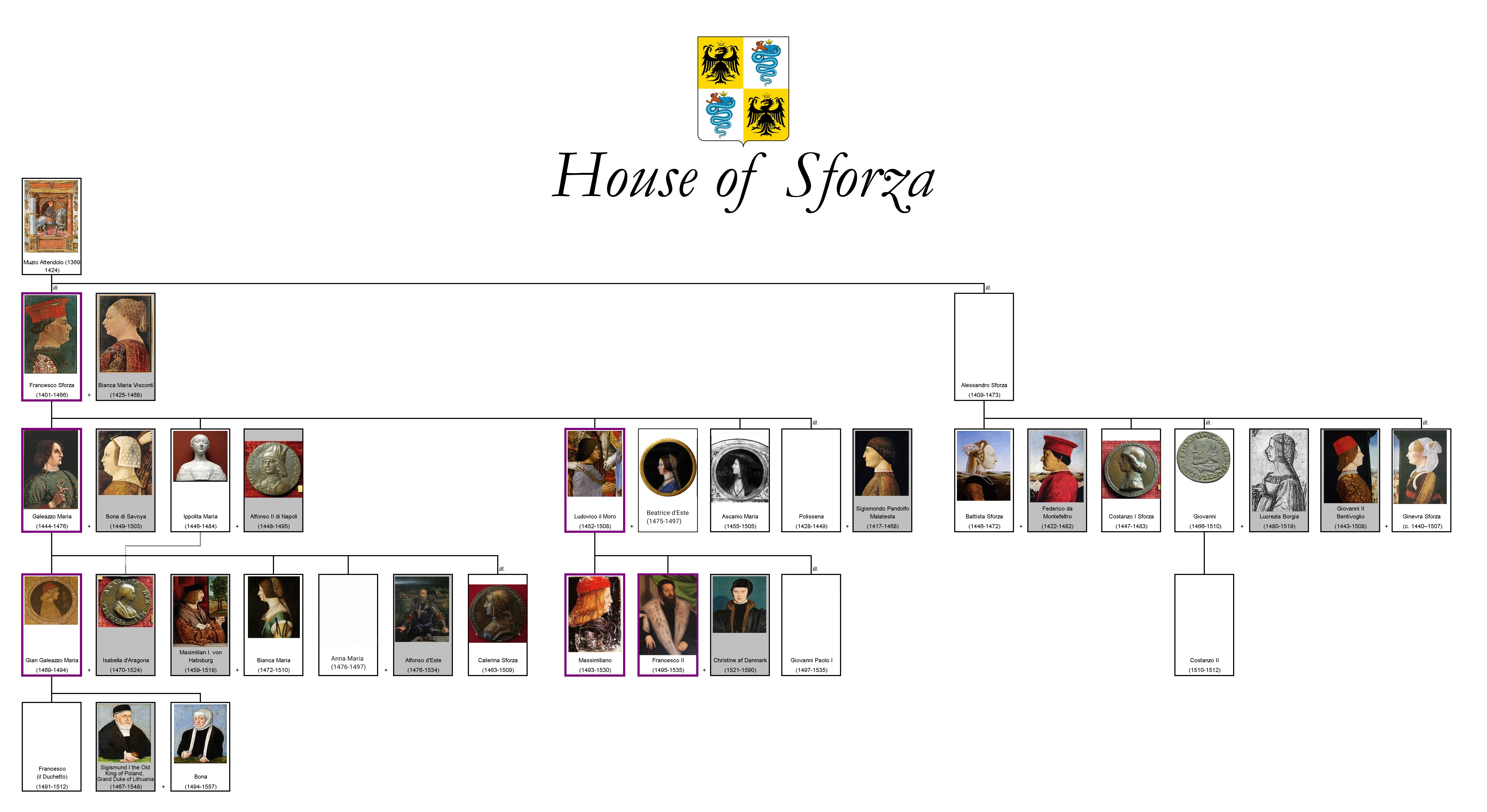
A family tree of the House of Sforza

- Muzio Sforza with mistress Lucia da Torsano had 7 illegitimate sons
  - son Gabriele Sforza archbishop of Milan
  - son Francesco I Sforza married Bianca Maria Visconti
    - son Galeazzo Maria Sforza married Bona of Savoy, mistress Lucrezia Landriani
      - daughter Bianca Maria (1472–1510), second wife of Holy Roman Emperor Maximilian I
      - son Gian Galeazzo (1469–1494), married his cousin Isabella of Naples
        - son Francesco (II), nominally duke under the regency of Ludovico Maria
        - daughter Bona (1494–1557), second wife of King of Poland Sigismund I the Old
        - daughter Ippolita Maria Sforza (1493–1501)
      - illegitimate daughter Caterina Sforza married Giovanni de' Medici il Popolano
      - illegitimate son Ottaviano Maria Sforza bishop of Lodi
    - son Ludovico il Moro (the Moor) (1451–1508)
      - son Ercole Massimiliano
      - son Francesco II (III) Maria
      - illegitimate daughter Bianca Sforza (1483–1496) married to Galeazzo Sanseverino
      - illegitimate son Giovanni Paolo I (1497–1535), marquess of Caravaggio
    - son Ascanio (1444–1505), Cardinal
    - daughter Ippolita Maria (1446–1484), married king of Alfonso II d'Aragon of Naples
    - illegitimate daughter Polissena (1428–1449), married Sigismondo Pandolfo Malatesta
  - son Alessandro, first lord of Pesaro
    - son Costanzo I
      - son Giovanni (1466–1510), first husband of Lucrezia Borgia
        - son Costanzo II (Giovanni Maria) last ruler of Pesaro
  - Bosio (count of Cotignola, lord of Castell'Arquato)

== Notable members ==
Name	Portrait	Relationship to the House of Sforza
Muzio Attendolo		Founder of the House of Sforza
Francesco Sforza		Son of Muzio Attendolo, first Sforza ruler of Milan
Bianca Maria Visconti		Wife of Francesco I Sforza
Galeazzo Maria Sforza		Son of Francesco I Sforza and Bianca Maria Visconti, Duke of Milan
Gian Galeazzo Sforza		Son of Galeazzo Maria Sforza
Bona Sforza		Daughter of Gian Galeazzo Sforza and Queen of Kingdom of Poland, as the wife of Sigismund I the Old, King of Kingdom of Poland
Bianca Maria Sforza		Daughter of Galeazzo Maria Sforza and Holy Roman Empress, as the wife of Maximilian I, Holy Roman Emperor
Anna Sforza		Daughter of Galeazzo Maria Sforza and wife of Alfonso I d'Este; Her successor would be the infamous Lucrezia Borgia
Caterina Sforza		Illegitimate daughter of Galeazzo Maria Sforza, Duke of Milan
Ludovico Sforza		Son of Francesco I Sforza and Bianca Maria Visconti, Duke of Milan
Maximilian Sforza		Son of Ludovico Sforza, Duke of Milan
Francesco II Sforza		Son of Ludovico Sforza, Duke of Milan
Giovanni Paolo I Sforza		Illegitimate son of Ludovico Sforza, first Marquess of Caravaggio

== Castellini Baldissera ==
While the House of Sforza has died out over the last century, it is closely related to the Castellini Baldissera family, who inherited a number of their palaces and estates.

== In popular culture ==
- One of the cursed artefacts from Friday the 13th: The Series was the "Sforza Glove", attributed to the original family's possession.
- Thomas Harris's character Hannibal Lecter is a descendant of the House of Sforza.
- In the book, anime, and manga series Trinity Blood, the Duchess of Milan, who is also one of the Cardinals, is named Caterina Sforza.
- Caterina Sforza appears as a non-playable character in the video game Assassin's Creed 2 and its sequel, Assassin's Creed: Brotherhood.
- The Sforza figure prominently in the Showtime series The Borgias.
- The house is mentioned in a song about the Borgia family in the British edutainment TV show Horrible Histories.
- There are notable members from the family in the television series Medici.
- There is a campaign in the Age of Empires II: Definitive Edition computer game named after the Sforza family where the player takes up the position of Francesco I Sforza.

== See also ==
- Gradara
- Italian Wars
- List of rulers of Milan
