= Camilla d'Aragona =

Italian regent

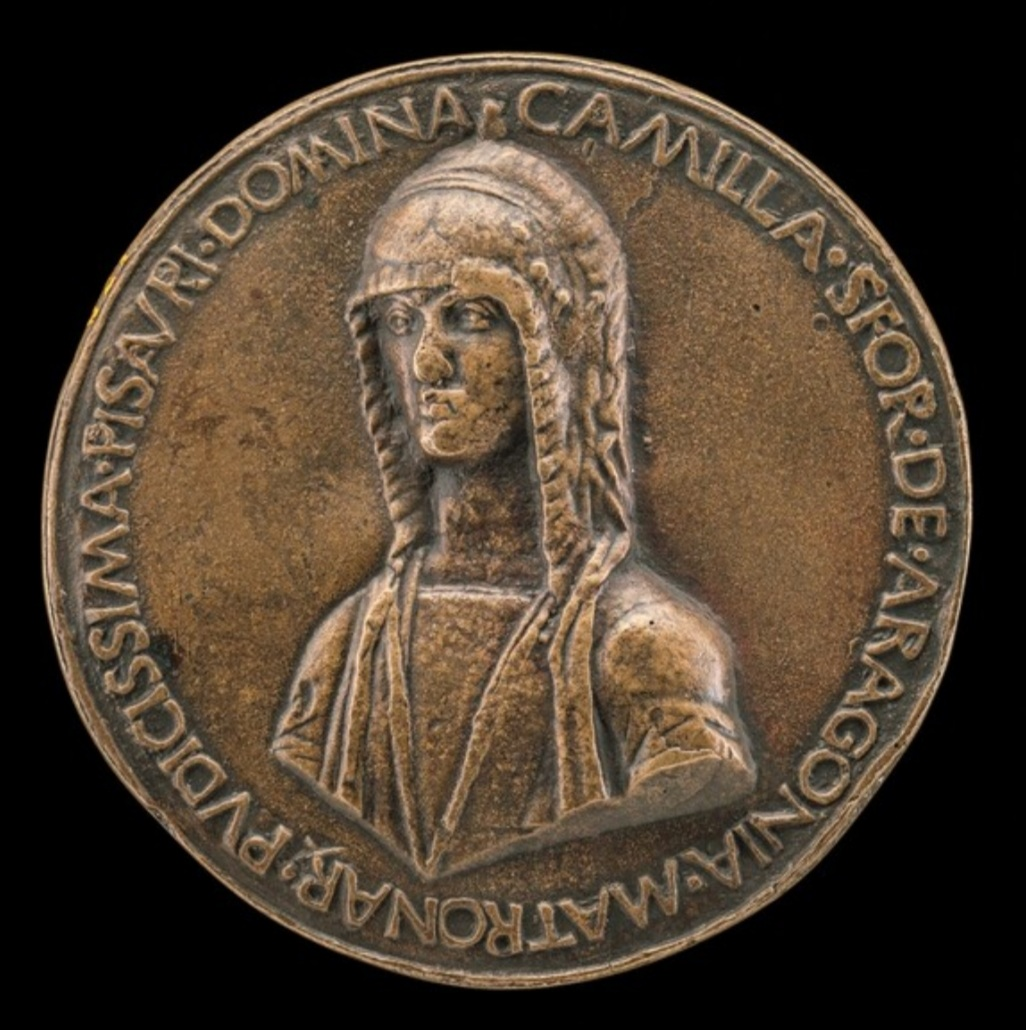
Camilla Marzano d'Aragona

Camilla Covella da Marzano or d'Aragona (fl. 1514), was an Italian regent. She served as regent of the Lordship of Gradara during the minority of her stepson Giovanni Sforza from 19 July 1483 to October 1483.

== Life ==
She was the daughter of Giovanni Francesco Mariano (known as Marino) da Marzano, third duke of Sessa and prince of Rossano and his wife Eleonora Diana d’Aragona. Eleonora had been born the illegitimate child of Alfonso V of Aragon, but had been legitimated later by her father.

In 1475 Camilla married Costanzo I Sforza, but they had no children and so he was succeeded on his death in 1483 by the eldest of his two illegitimate sons, Giovanni Sforza. Giovanni was then only aged 17 and so initially the lordship was ruled by Camilla as regent. She ruled from 19 July 1483 to October 1483.
