= Costanzo I Sforza =

Italian condottiero

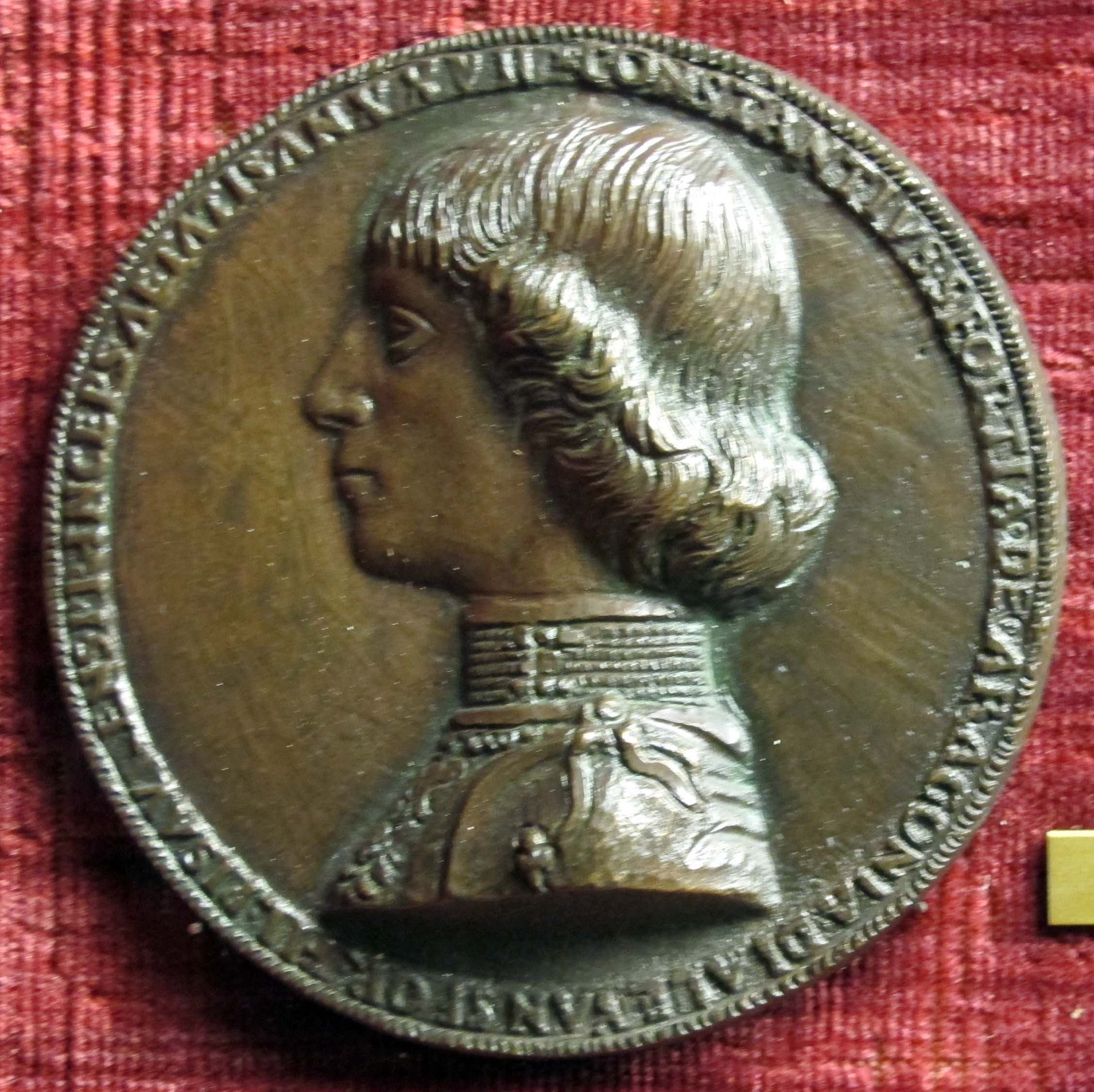
- Medal of Costanzo I Sforza by Gianfrancesco Enzola.

Lord of Pesaro
- In office 1473–1483
- Preceded by: Alessandro
- Succeeded by: Giovanni

Costanzo I of Sforza (5 July 1447 – 19 July 1483) was an Italian condottiero, lord of Pesaro and Gradara.

He was the son of Alessandro Sforza, under whom he fought in his early years and from whom he inherited the lordship of Pesaro. He also received the lordship of Gradara from Pope Alexander VI.

He fought for various Italian states of the time, including the Kingdom of Naples and the Papal States.

He married Camilla d'Aragona but they had no children and so his illegitimate seventeen-year-old son Giovanni succeeded him in Pesaro, with Camilla initially ruling as regent.

Preceded by Alessandro	Lord of Pesaro; 1473 – 1483	Succeeded by Giovanni
Preceded by None	Lord of Gradara; 14?? – 1483	Succeeded by Giovanni
