= Pesaro Cathedral =

Coordinates: 43.91097°N 12.91466°E

Cattedrale di Santa Maria Assunta
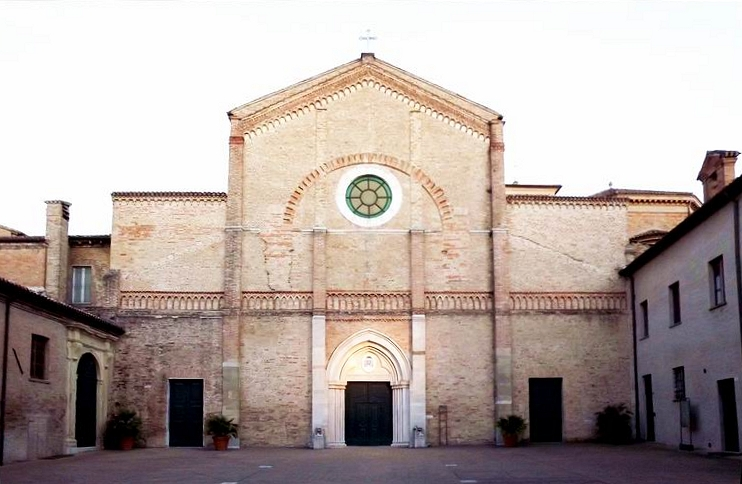
- Façade of the cathedral
- Cattedrale di Santa Maria Assunta
- Location: Pesaro, Italy
- Denomination: Roman Catholic

History
- Status: Cathedral

Architecture
- Functional status: Active
- Style: Romanesque; Neoclassical architecture

Administration
- Archdiocese: Pesaro

Clergy
- Archbishop: Piero Coccia

Pesaro Cathedral (Italian: Duomo di Pesaro; Cattedrale di Santa Maria Assunta) is a Roman Catholic cathedral in Pesaro, Marche, Italy, dedicated to the Assumption of the Virgin Mary.

It is the archiepiscopal seat of the Archdiocese of Pesaro.

== History ==
The Pesaro Cathedral was constructed in the 6th century on the site of a Roman basilica which was destroyed during the Gothic War. Excavations suggest that this basilica was used by early Christians. Mosaics uncovered in the cathedral credit the Eastern Roman general John with the construction of the cathedral after the Gothic War. The relics of Saint Terence of Pesaro were transferred to the newly built cathedral.

The cathedral's bell tower was damaged by the army of Cesare Borgia in 1503. A reconstruction project resulted in the expansion of the cathedral. Further renovations were made in 1865, preserving the original façade of the cathedral.

== Gallery ==
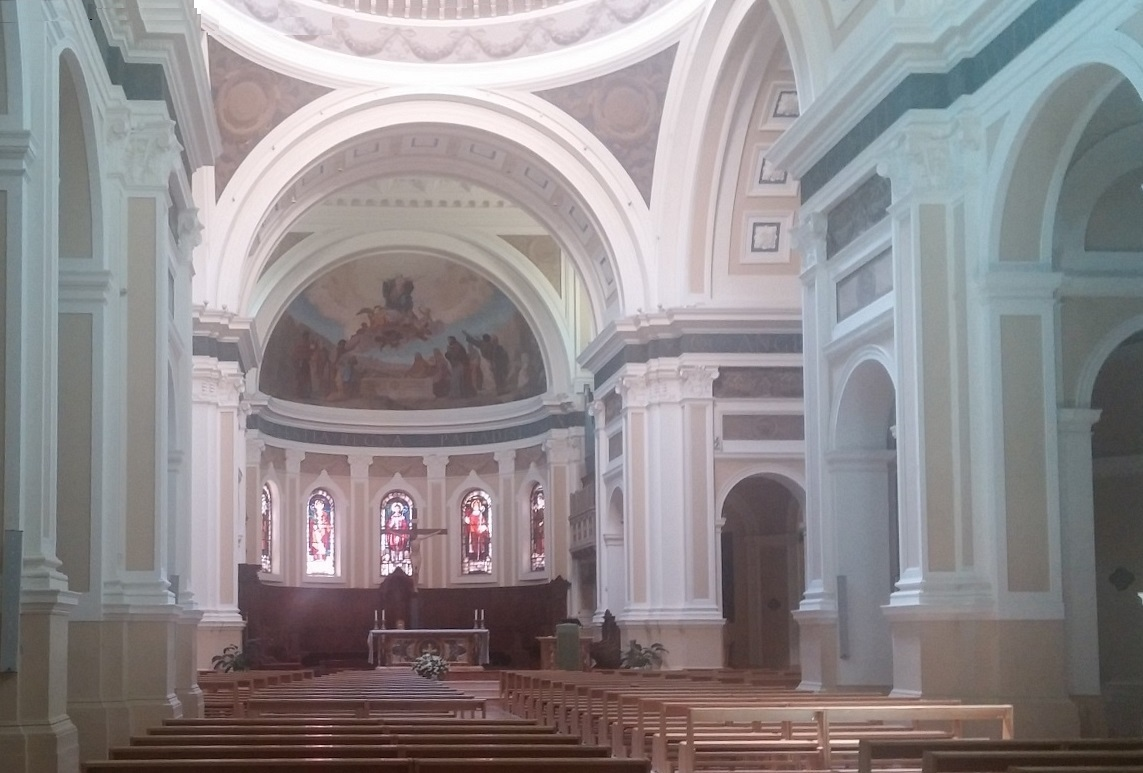
Interior of cathedral.

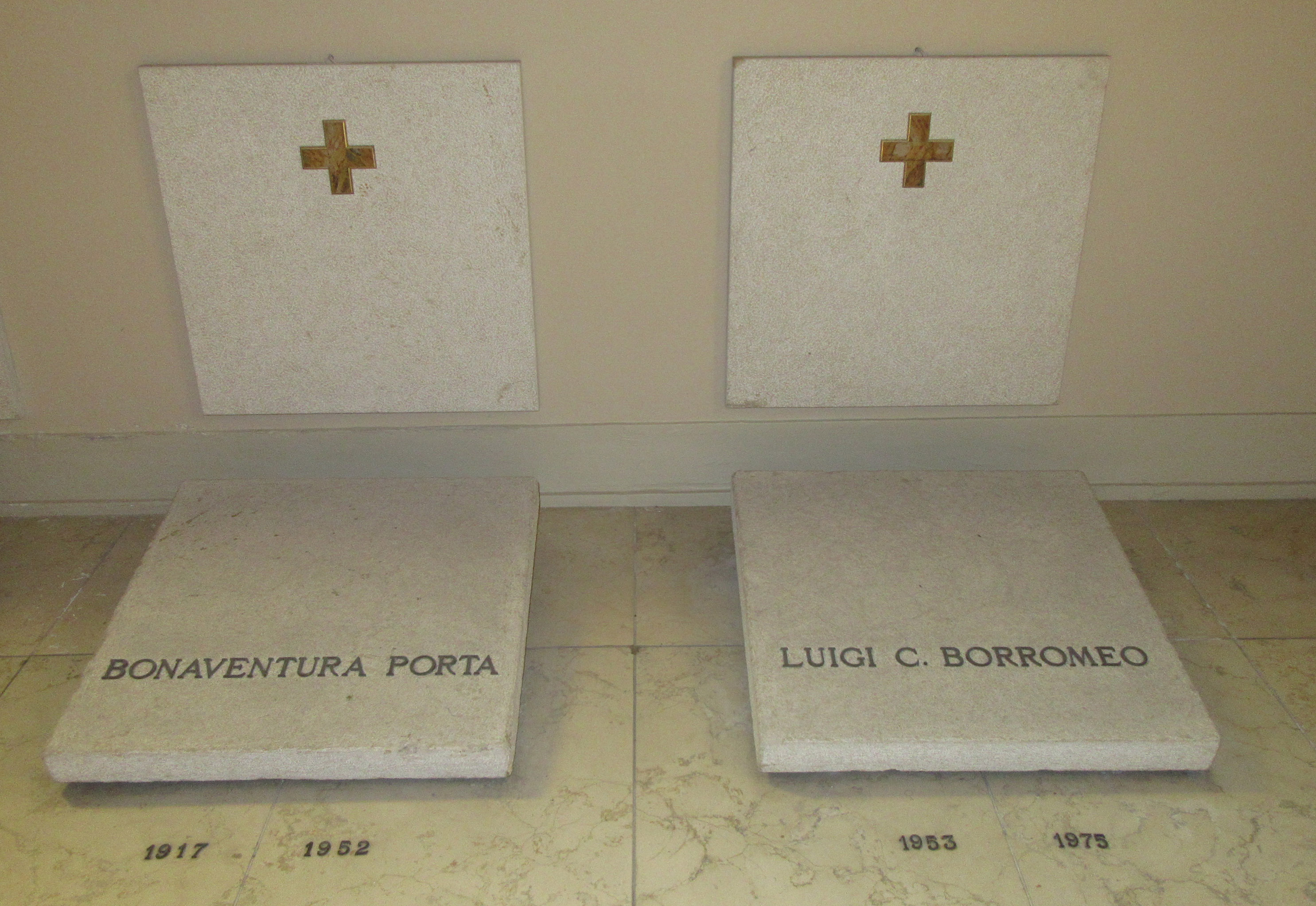
Bishops Porta and Borromeo graves.
