= Luigi Carlo Borromeo =

Italian bishop

- Bishop of Pesaro
- Church: Roman Catholic Church
- See: Roman Catholic Diocese of Pesaro
- In office: 1952–1975
- Predecessor: Bonaventura Porta
- Successor: Gaetano Michetti
- Previous post: Auxiliary bishop of Lodi

Orders
- Ordination: 30 March 1918
- Consecration: 2 December 1951 by Mgr Pietro Calchi Novati

Personal details
- Born: 26 October 1893 Graffignana, Italy
- Died: 4 July 1975 (aged 81) Policlinico San Matteo, Pavia, Italy
- Buried: Pesaro Cathedral
- Denomination: Roman Catholic Church
- Occupation: bishop
- Profession: priest

Styles of Luigi Carlo Borromeo
- Reference style: His Excellency
- Spoken style: Your Excellency
- Religious style: Bishop

Luigi Carlo Borromeo (26 October 1893 – 4 July 1975) was the Italian Bishop of the Roman Catholic Diocese of Pesaro from his appointment by Pope Pius XII on 28 December 1952 until his death on 4 July 1975.

== Biography ==
Born in Graffignana in 1893, Borromeo was ordained a Catholic priest on 20 March 1918. He was appointed Auxiliary bishop of Lodi on 4 November 1951 and was ordained titular Bishop of Choma on 2 December 1951.

He was appointed bishop of Pesaro on 28 December 1952. He was council father during the four sessions of Second Vatican Council, and in Pesaro, in 1971, he consecrated the new parish dedicated to St. Charles Borromeo.

Bishop Luigi Carlo Borromeo died at Policlinico San Matteo on 4 July 1975, at the age of 81.

== Bibliography ==
- Ernestus Preziosi; "La marea che sale…" Mons. Luigi Borromeo vescovo di Pesaro e l’apertura a sinistra; Pisaurum; From: Frammenti. Quaderni per la ricerca, n. 11/2007.

== Gallery ==
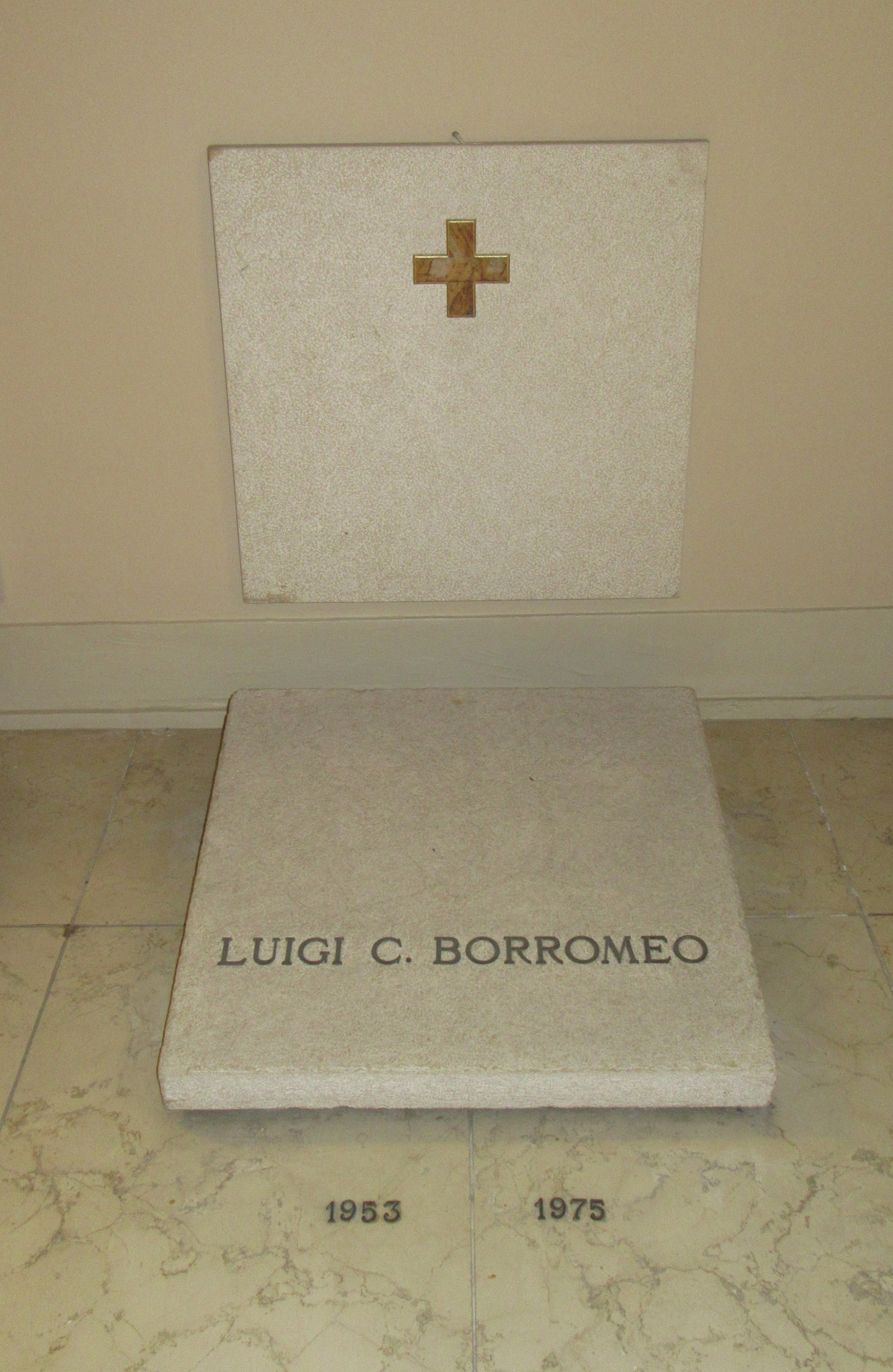
Bishop Borromeo's grave, in Pesaro Cathedral

Catholic Church titles
| Preceded by Lorenzo Bianchi | Titular Bishop of Choma; 1951–1952 | Succeeded by John Baptist Sye Bong-Kil |

Catholic Church titles
| Preceded by Bonaventura Porta | Bishop of Pesaro; 1952–1975 | Succeeded by Gaetano Michetti |
