= Gran Madre di Dio =

Gran Madre di Dio (Italian for 'Great Mother of God') may refer to the following churches:

- Gran Madre di Dio, Rome
- Gran Madre di Dio, Turin
