= Graffignana =

Graffignana Grafignàn (Lombard)
- Comune
- Comune di Graffignana
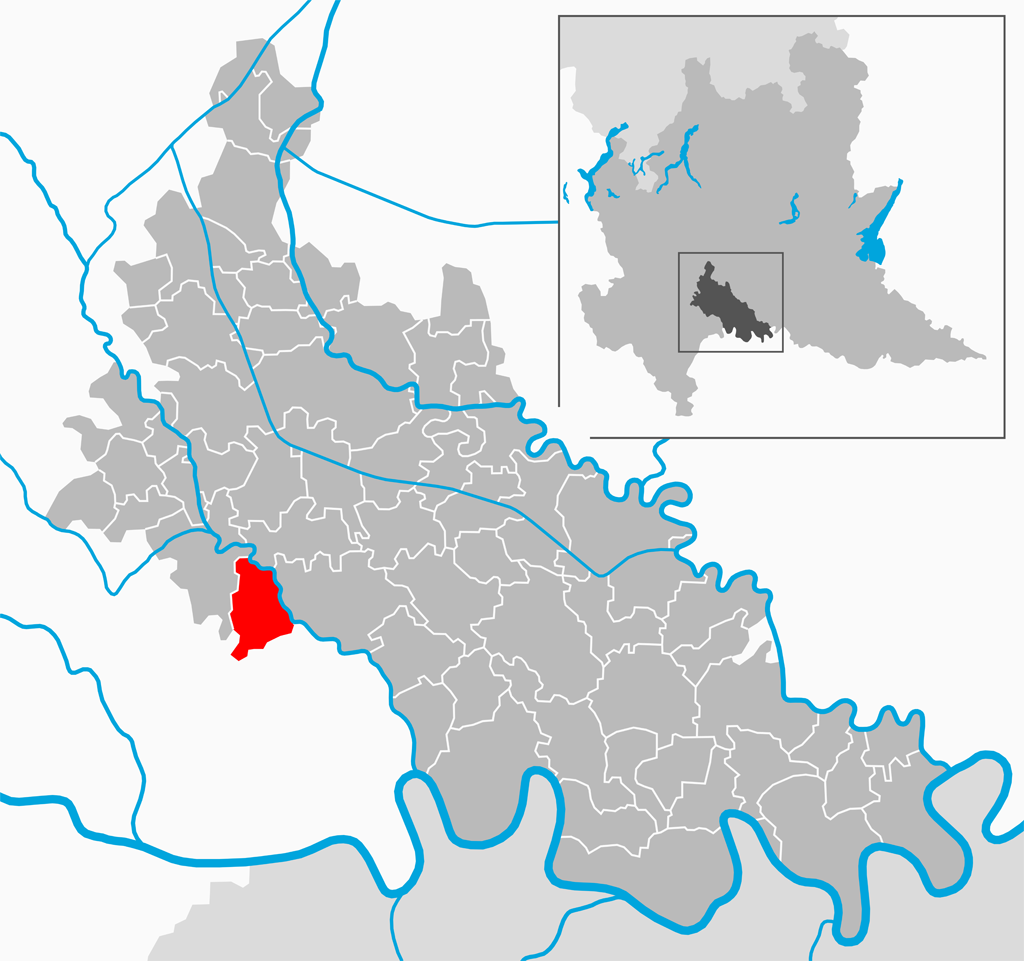

- Location within Italy Location within Lombardy
- Coordinates: 45°12′N 9°30′E
- Country: Italy
- Region: Lombardy
- Province: Lodi (LO)

Government
  - Mayor: Giuseppe Enrico Galetta

Area
  - Total: 10.7 km^{2} (4.1 sq mi)
- Elevation: 67 m (220 ft)

Population (31 August 2017)
  - Total: 2,624
  - Density: 245/km^{2} (635/sq mi)
- Demonym: Graffignanini
- Time zone: UTC+1 (CET)
  - Summer (DST): UTC+2 (CEST)
- Postal code: 26813
- Dialing code: 0371
- Patron saint: Sts. Peter and Paul
- Saint day: 29 June
- Website: Official website

Graffignana (Lodigiano: Grafignàn) is a comune (municipality) in the Province of Lodi in the Italian region Lombardy, located about 40 km (25 mi) southeast of Milan and about 13 km (8.1 mi) south of Lodi.

Graffignana borders the following municipalities: Sant'Angelo Lodigiano, Villanova del Sillaro, Borghetto Lodigiano, San Colombano al Lambro, Miradolo Terme.

== People ==
- Luigi Carlo Borromeo, (1893–1975), bishop of Pesaro
