= Terence of Pesaro =

Saint Terence of Pesaro
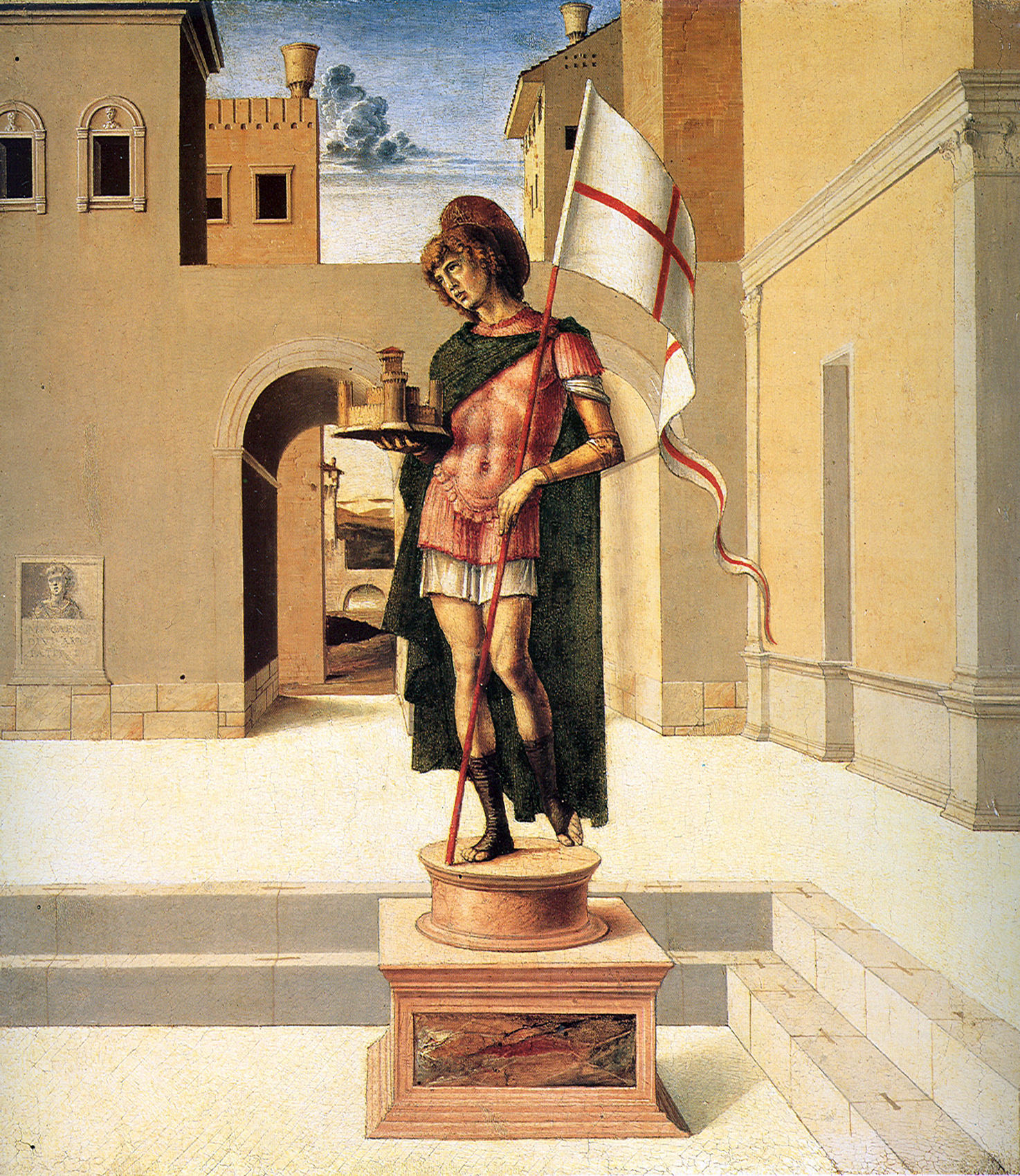
- Saint Terence on the predella of the Pesaro Altarpiece

Martyr
- Died: ~251 AD
- Venerated in: Roman Catholic Church
- Major shrine: Pesaro Cathedral
- Feast: 24 September
- Attributes: soldier's attire, flagpole, tipped with a small cross, palm of martyrdom, model of Pesaro
- Patronage: Pesaro

Saint Terence (Latin: sanctus Terentius, Italian: San Terenzio) is the patron saint of Pesaro. According to tradition, he was from Pannonia and fled to the Adriatic coast to escape the persecution of Christians under Decius (ca. 250–51). His corpse was eventually thrown into a gorge near some hot springs (locally called acqua mala or acqua cattiva), near Pesaro. The place of his martyrdom was considered to be the area called the Apsella di Montelabbate, near the Abbey of San Tomaso in Foglia. This area contains sulphurous springs, and locally they are called the l'Acqua di S. Terenzio.

An alternative tradition makes him the first bishop of Pesaro, and a native of the city, rather than a Pannonian layman. Early representations of Terence depict him as an aging bishop. However, later depictions show him as a young man in military dress, with the palm of martyrdom in one hand and a model of the city in the other, thus counting him amongst the "military saints." Giovanni Antonio Bellinzoni da Pesaro (ca. 1415 – ca. 1477) depicts him this way.

== Veneration ==
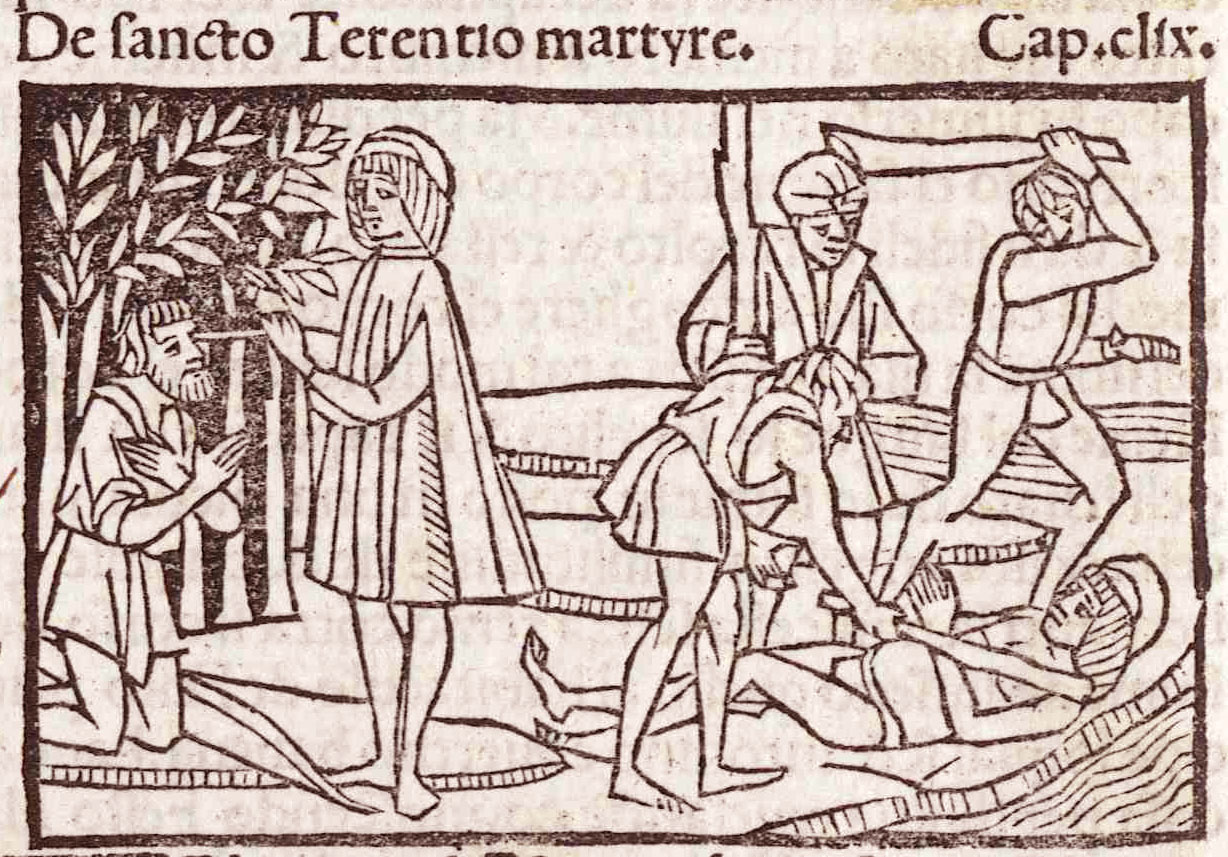
The Martyrdom of Terence in the Golden Legend (1497)

His body may have been buried by Bishop Florentius of Pesaro outside the city, close to Caprile, which ancient documents call the Valle di S. Terenzio. Another tradition states that his body was buried by a local woman named Theodosia. His relics were then translated to the basilica of San Decenzio (now the Chiesa del Cimitero centrale) before being translated in the sixth century to the recently constructed Pesaro Cathedral by Bishop Felix of Pesaro.

The relics, placed initially in a crypt, were transferred by Giovanni Benedetti in 1447 to a large altar in which the relics were placed in a wooden urn, on which the aforementioned painter Bellinzoni depicted Terence. The urn is now found at the Museo Civico, in Palazzo Toschi-Mosca, and the relics themselves were translated to a new urn in a new cathedral chapel inaugurated in 1909, where the following inscription can be found: CIVITAS PISAURENSIS TUTELARI SUO A.D. MCMIX.

As a soldier saint, Terence is considered to have appeared twice in times of crisis, the second vision occurring on 9 June 1793, in the times of the Cisalpine Republic, when Pesaro was besieged by French troops: a horseman appeared on the walls of the city, accompanied by a woman dispensing munitions. The vision terrified the French so much that they abandoned their siege. In gratitude, Terence was officially proclaimed patron of the city on 20 March 1802.

Terenzio's most famous figuration in art is his minor appearance—as a young soldier saint—in a predella panel of Giovanni Bellini's "Pesaro Altarpiece", The Coronation of the Virgin (ca. 1475–80); in it Terenzio, as the city's patron, holds a model representing the Nuova Rocca, or Fortezza Costanzo, the citadel of Pesaro newly rebuilt by Costanzo Sforza.
