= Timeline of the COVID-19 pandemic in Italy =

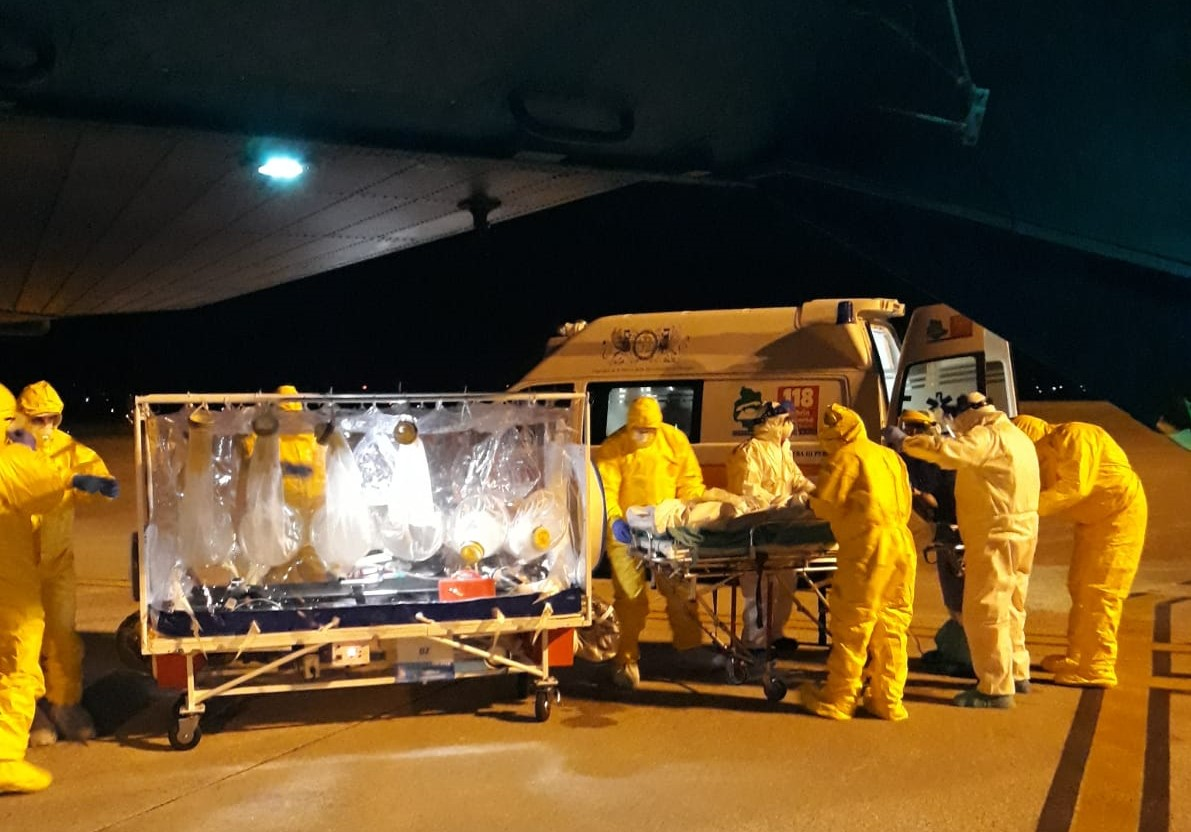
Paramedics carrying a patient under biocontainment, in Cervia

The following is a timeline of the COVID-19 pandemic in Italy.

== Timeline ==
=== January 2020: First confirmed cases ===
On 30 January, the first two cases of COVID-19 were confirmed in Rome. A Chinese couple, originally from Wuhan, the epicenter of the virus, who had arrived in Italy on 23 January via Milan Malpensa Airport, travelled from the airport to Verona, then to Parma, arriving in Rome on 28 January. The next afternoon, they developed a cough, and by evening the man had a fever; the couple were taken to the Lazzaro Spallanzani National Institute for Infectious Diseases where they tested positive for SARS-CoV-2 and were hospitalised. On 2 February, a team from the same institute composed of scientists Maria Rosaria Capobianchi, Francesca Colavita, and Concetta Castilletti isolated the genomic sequence of the virus and uploaded it to GenBank.

On 30 January, the Italian government suspended all flights to and from China and declared a state of emergency with the duration of six months. Prime Minister Giuseppe Conte said Italy was the first EU country to take this kind of precautionary measure. The government also introduced thermal scanners and temperature checks on international passengers arriving at Italian airports.

On 6 February, an Italian man evacuated from Wuhan tested positive for COVID-19, bringing the total number of cases in Italy to three.

On 22 February, the evacuated Italian man recovered and was discharged from the hospital. On 22 and 26 February, the two previously infected Chinese tourists tested negative for COVID-19 at Lazzaro Spallanzani National Institute in Rome.

=== February–March 2020: Clusters in Northern Italy ===
Lombardy is a densely inhabited area with a population of about 10 million. The outbreak there came to light when a 38-year-old Italian tested positive in Codogno, a comune in the province of Lodi. On 14 February, he felt unwell and went to see a doctor in Castiglione d'Adda. He was prescribed treatments for influenza. On 16 February, as the man's condition worsened, he went to Codogno Hospital, reporting respiratory problems. Initially there was no suspicion of COVID-19, so no additional precautionary measures were taken, and the virus was able to infect other patients and health workers. Later, the patient, his pregnant wife and a friend tested positive. On 20 February, three more cases were confirmed after the patients reported symptoms of pneumonia. Thereafter, extensive screenings and checks were performed on everyone that had possibly been in contact with or near the infected subjects. It was subsequently reported that the origin of these cases had a possible connection to the first European local transmission that occurred in Munich, Germany, on 19 January 2020. Doctors in Codogno stated that the 38-year-old patient led an active social life in the weeks before his illness and potentially interacted with dozens of people before spreading the virus at their Hospital. Afterward, he was transferred to Policlinico San Matteo in Pavia, and his wife to Sacco Hospital in Milan.

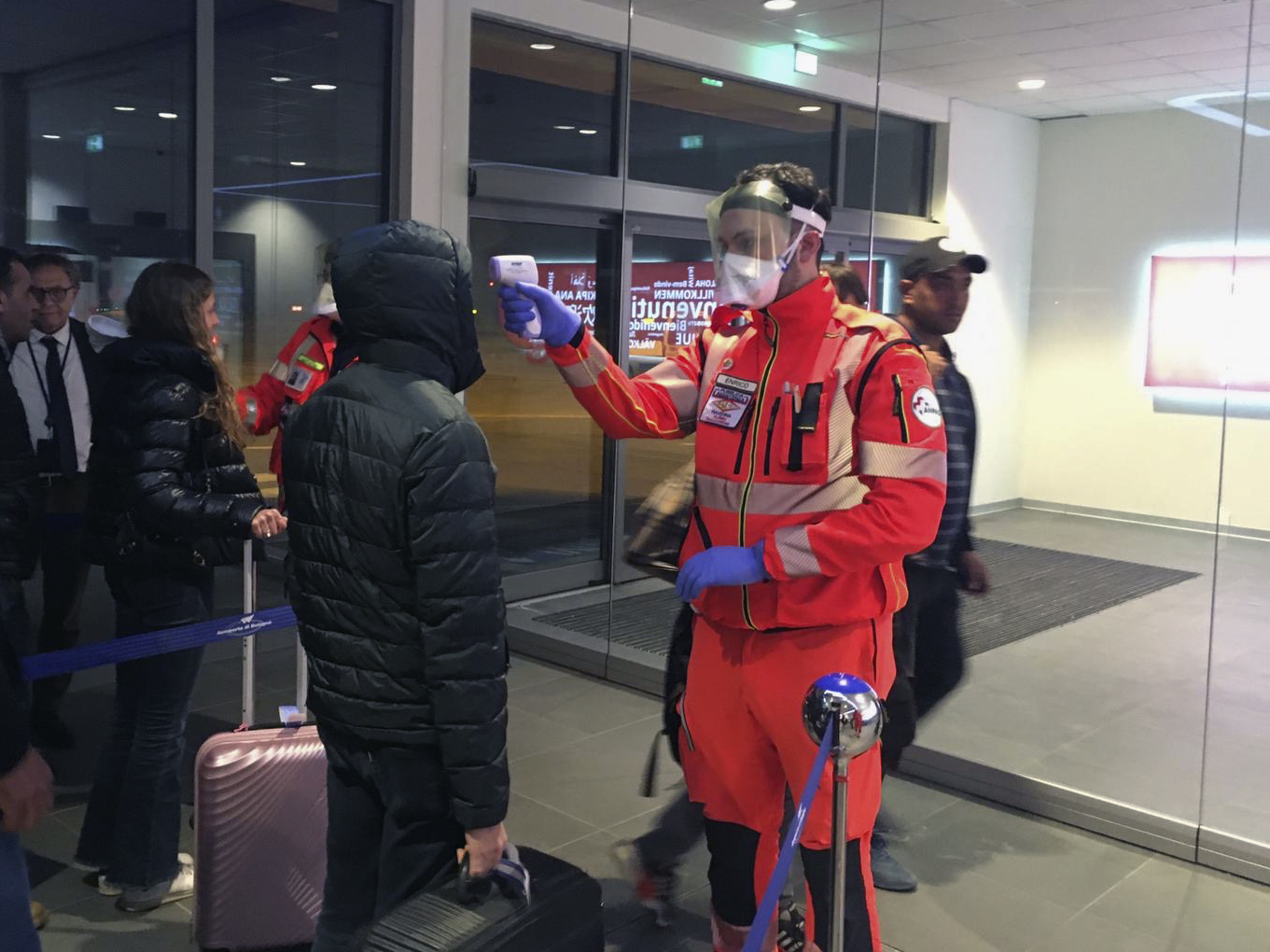
Civil Protection volunteers carrying out health checks at Guglielmo Marconi Airport

On 21 February 16 more cases were confirmed – 14 in Lombardy, including the doctor who prescribed treatments to the 38-year-old Codogno man, and two in Veneto. On 22 February, a 77-year-old woman from Casalpusterlengo, who had pneumonia and had visited the same emergency room as the 38-year-old from Codogno, died in Lombardy. Including the 78-year-old man who died in Veneto, the number of cases in Italy rose to 79. Of the 76 newly discovered cases, 54 were found in Lombardy, including one patient in San Raffaele Hospital in Milan and eight patients in Policlinico San Matteo in Pavia, 17 in Veneto, two in Emilia-Romagna, two in Lazio and one in Piedmont.

A secondary cluster of infections occurred in the region of Veneto, which was initially thought to be the result of a farmer being infected when visiting the primary source in Codogno. The farmer was tested, and the following day, the test was confirmed negative. On 21 February 2020, two people tested positive in Veneto. The next day, one of them, a 78-year-old man, died at the Schiavonia Hospital in Monselice, making him the first fatality in Italy. The man lived in the municipality of Vò, which was put under quarantine.

On 23 February, a 68-year-old woman with cancer from Trescore Cremasco died in Crema. The number of cases in Italy rose to 152, including fourteen patients being treated at Policlinico San Matteo in Pavia. On 24 February, an 84-year-old man with pre-existing medical conditions from Villa di Serio died in Bergamo while hospitalised in the Papa Giovanni XXIII Hospital. An 88-year-old man from Caselle Landi, who resided in Codogno, died on the same day. An 80-year-old man from Castiglione d'Adda died at the Luigi Sacco Hospital in Milan. He was previously hospitalised in Lodi because of a heart attack, and then transferred to Milan when confirmed as positive. A 62-year-old man with pre-existing medical conditions from Castiglione d'Adda died in Sant'Anna Hospital in Como. Lombardy governor Attilio Fontana announced that the number of cases in Lombardy had risen to 172, with a total of 229 confirmed in Italy. On 25 February, an 84-year-old man from Nembro, a 91-year-old man from San Fiorano and an 83-year-old woman from Codogno died from complications caused by the infections. On the same day, a 76-year-old woman with pre-existing medical conditions died in Treviso. On 26 February, an additional case involving a minor was identified. An 8-year-old girl who lived in Codevigo tested positive.

The number of cases in Emilia-Romagna rose to 23, spreading through the provinces of Piacenza, Parma, Modena and Rimini. These were all linked to the Lombardy cluster. A new case linked to the outbreak in Lombardy appeared in Palermo, Sicily, when a 60-year-old woman from Bergamo tested positive and was admitted to Cervello Hospital. A 49-year-old man who previously visited Codogno tested positive in Pescia, Tuscany. Officials in Liguria confirmed that a 72-year-old female tourist from Castiglione d'Adda tested positive in Alassio while she was staying in a hotel. The woman was treated at a hospital in Genoa. Later in the day, a second case in Liguria was confirmed, a 54-year-old man who had visited Codogno for work and tested positive in La Spezia. On 26 February, a 69-year-old man from Lodi with pre-existing medical conditions died in Emilia-Romagna. The mayor of Borgonovo Val Tidone, Pietro Mazzocchi, tested positive for SARS-CoV-2 and underwent a voluntary isolation at home.

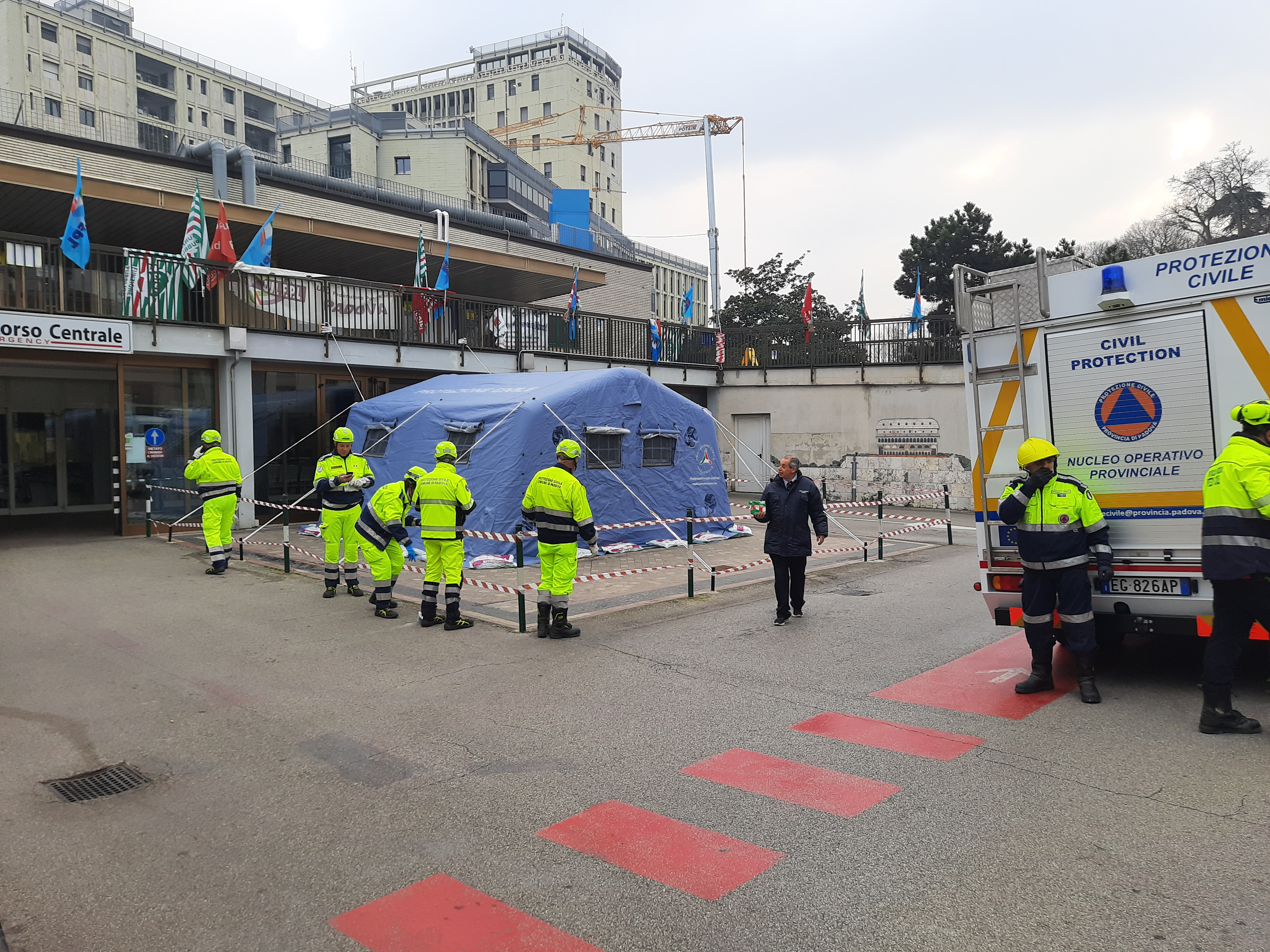
Civil Protection's first aid spot in Padua

Additional cases involving six minors were identified in Lombardy. A 4-year-old girl from Castiglione d'Adda was admitted to Policlinico San Matteo in Pavia, and a 15-year-old was hospitalised in Seriate Hospital in Bergamo. Two 10-year-olds from Cremona and Lodi tested positive and were discharged. A 17-year-old from Valtellina who attended a school in Codogno, and a school friend from Sondrio, also tested positive. Officials in Apulia confirmed that a 33-year-old man from Taranto, who returned from Codogno on 24 February, tested positive and was admitted to San Giuseppe Moscati Hospital. A close advisor to Lombardy governor Attilio Fontana tested positive for SARS-CoV-2. Although Fontana tested negative, he decided to put himself in preventive isolation as well. Officials in Campania confirmed two new cases. A 24-year-old woman from Caserta, who had visited Milan, tested positive. A 25-year-old Ukrainian woman from Cremona, who previously visited Lombardy, tested positive at a hospital in Vallo della Lucania. Both were transferred to Hospital Domenico Cotugno in Naples, where they underwent isolation.

On 26 February, a woman who had returned from Milan in the days before the emergency in Lombardy had started tested positive for the virus in Catania, Sicily. On 27 February, two 88-year-olds and an 80-year-old died in Lombardy. Officials in Abruzzo confirmed that a 50-year-old man from Brianza, Lombardy tested positive and was admitted to the intensive-care unit at Giuseppe Mazzini Hospital at Teramo. He and his family were staying in his holiday home at Roseto degli Abruzzi. On 28 February, four people died, including an 85-year-old Lombardy resident in one of the quarantine zones at a hospital in Piacenza, a 77-year-old and two others over the age of 80. As of 1 March 2020, there were 984 confirmed cases and 73 recoveries in Lombardy. On the same day, Veneto governor Luca Zaia mentioned that after the first two cases, he ordered all 3,300 Vò residents to be tested. Of 6,800 swabs, 1.7% were confirmed positive. This epidemiological study would be used for outbreak investigation by the University of Padua.

On 4 March, Emilia-Romagna's regional minister of health, Raffaele Donini, and minister for territories, Barbara Lori, were declared positive for COVID-19. Governor Stefano Bonaccini and the other members of the regional government tested negative.

On 8 March, Prime Minister Giuseppe Conte extended the quarantine lockdown to cover the whole region of Lombardy and 14 other northern provinces. On 10 March, Prime Minister Conte increased the quarantine lockdown to cover all of Italy, including travel restrictions and a ban on public gatherings. By 14 March, no new cases were detected in the municipality of Vò.

On 25 March, the Associated Press dubbed the UEFA Champions League match between Bergamo club Atalanta B.C. and Spanish club Valencia at the San Siro in Milan on 19 February as "Game Zero". The match was the first time Atalanta has progressed to a Champions League round of 16 match, and had an attendance of over 40,000 people – about one-third of Bergamo's population. By 24 March, almost 7,000 people in the province of Bergamo had tested positive for COVID-19, and more than 1,000 people had died from the virus – making Bergamo the most hard-hit province in all of Italy during the pandemic.

=== March 2020: Spread to other regions ===
On 25 February, the first case in Florence, Tuscany involved a 63-year-old entrepreneur with companies in Asia who had returned from the Philippines and Singapore on 6 January. He tested positive and was admitted to Santa Maria Annunziata Hospital.

The first case in Rimini involved a 71-year-old man from Cattolica who returned from Romania on 22 February. He tested positive and was admitted to Infermi Hospital. A 51-year-old man from Piandimeleto who went to Romania with the man also tested positive and underwent self-quarantine at home. On 26 February, one of the people with whom he had interacted in Romania tested positive.

On 26 February, the Norwegian Institute of Public Health confirmed that a 26-year-old Norwegian man living in Florence tested positive and had been admitted to Santa Maria Annunziata Hospital. He had been staying in Norway for 14 days and had returned to Florence five days before becoming ill.

Number of cases (blue) and number of deaths (red) on a logarithmic scale.

The passenger ferry GNV Rhapsody was placed under isolation in the port of Genoa with 58 crew members on board after a passenger tested positive for the virus after having sailed to Tunisia on the ship.

On 7 March, President of Lazio and leader of the Democratic Party, Nicola Zingaretti, tested positive for COVID-19. Ten days before, he was in Milan attending public events. The following day, President of Piedmont Alberto Cirio also tested positive.

A US Navy sailor stationed in Naples tested positive on 6 March. Health officials in the US military began "a thorough contact investigation" to determine if any other person may have been exposed to the virus.

On 11 March, it was announced that Juventus and national team footballer Daniele Rugani had tested positive for COVID-19.

GIMBE (Italy's Group for Evidence-based Medicine), in a report from 18 March, analysed data from the Istituto Superiore di Sanità and found that healthcare workers represented over 8% of all detected COVID-19 cases.

On 26 March 2020, Italica Grondona became the world's oldest person to recover successfully from COVID-19 at the age of 102. She was successfully recovered from COVID-19 after being tested positive with mild symptoms and was hospitalised in Genoa on 9 March for 20 days.

On 22 March, it was announced that Juventus forward Paulo Dybala and former Italy national team captain Paolo Maldini had tested positive for COVID-19.

=== March–May 2020: Under national lockdown ===
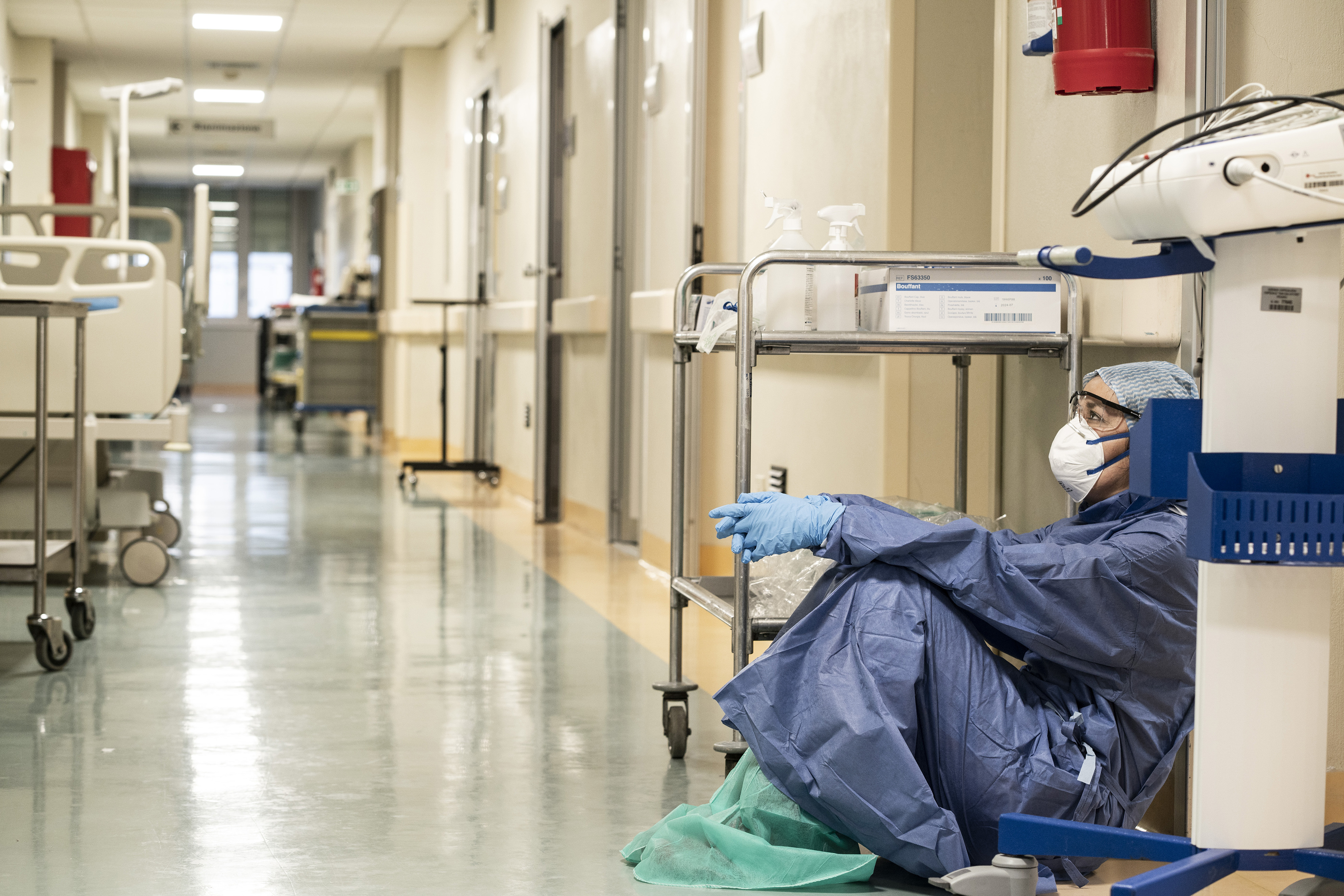
An exhausted anesthesiologist physician, in Pesaro's hospital, March 2020

Starting on 8 March, the region of Lombardy together with 14 additional northern and central provinces in Piedmont, Emilia-Romagna, Veneto, and Marche, were put under lockdown. Two days later, the government extended the lockdown measures to the whole country.

Two weeks later, the number of new cases per day started to show signs of slowing down, while the number of new deaths rose slightly. On 31 March, the president of the Italian National Institute of Health, Silvio Brusaferro, announced that the pandemic had reached its peak in the country. The news was confirmed also by the head of the Civil Protection, Angelo Borrelli.

Three weeks into the lockdown, its effects began to show. Italy reported declines in the number of new cases and of new deaths per day. The country also saw a steady decrease in the occupancy of intensive care units. On 5 April, Italy had the lowest number of new daily deaths in two and a half weeks, and one day later the lowest number of new daily cases in three weeks. On 20 April 2020, Italy saw the first fall in the number of active cases.

=== May–September 2020: Reduction of cases and loosening of restrictions ===
COVID-19 cases started to decline in May 2020, thanks to the two-months lockdown. Freedom of movements was re-established on 4 May and other not essential activities re-opened later in the month.

As of 21 July 2020, Lombardy was the Italian region with the highest number of people testing positive (95,459 units) and with highest number of deaths officially registered and ascribed to COVID-19 (16,788 units).

=== September 2020 – October 2020: Arrival of the second wave ===
Since the end of September 2020, the virus regained strength and grew its prevalence in the regions of Campania and Lazio. This corresponded to a rise in new cases experienced also in other major European countries.

On 14 October, cases of COVID-19 positives exceeded the peak of the March infections.

On October 15, the governor of Campania closed schools and universities until 30 October 2020.

=== November 2020–January 2021: A new lockdown ===
On 4 November 2020, Prime Minister Conte announced a new lockdown, dividing the country into three zones depending on the severity of the pandemic, corresponding to red, orange and yellow zones. Moreover, a national curfew from 10 PM to 5 AM was implemented, as well as compulsory weekend closing for shopping malls, and online education in high schools. Conte described the situation as "particularly critical", asserting that the virus was moving at a "strong and even violent" pace.

- In red zones, lockdown measures were similar to the ones which were implemented from March to May 2020, such as compulsory closing for shops, restaurants and other activities, online education for schools except for kindergartens, elementary schools and sixth-grade classes, and no movements allowed except for working or necessity reasons.
- In orange zones, restrictions included compulsory closing of restaurants and online education for high schools only, while movement within the home-town territory was still allowed.
- In yellow zones, the only restrictions included compulsory closing for restaurant and bar activities at 6 PM, and online education for high schools only.

Starting from 6 November, Lombardy, Piedmont, Aosta Valley and Calabria were classified as red zones. Sicily and Apulia were classified as orange zones, while the rest of the country was declared as yellow zone. On 9 November, the autonomous province of South Tyrol was declared red zone as well. In the following week, Campania and Tuscany were also declared red zones, while other seven regions, Emilia-Romagna, Friuli-Venezia Giulia, Liguria, Umbria, Marche, Abruzzo and Basilicata, became orange zones. On 18 December, Abruzzo was added to the list of red zones.

On 2 December, a further movement restriction was implemented by the government in order to prevent an increase in cases during the Christmas holidays period, forbidding movement between regions from 21 December to 6 January. To prevent people from gathering during Christmas, Saint Stephen's Day and New Year's Day, travel between different comuni was also restricted, and the curfew for New Year's Eve was extended to 7 AM.

As of 13 December, no region was declared red zone anymore. Abruzzo, Campania, Tuscany, the autonomous province of South Tyrol and Aosta Valley were classified as orange zones, and the remaining 16 regions and the autonomous province of Trento were yellow zones.

=== March 2021–present ===
On 1 March, Sardinia was the first region to become white zone, with no restrictions at all. After 3 weeks from its change, on March 21, the region became a red zone, due to the ever growing infections.

On 8 March 2021 Italy passed over 100,000 deaths for COVID-19.

Throughout the Easter holiday period, all Italy was put in red zone, to avoid trips to celebrate the holidays that could have led to further cases.
