= San Colombano al Lambro =

- Comune
- Comune di San Colombano al Lambro
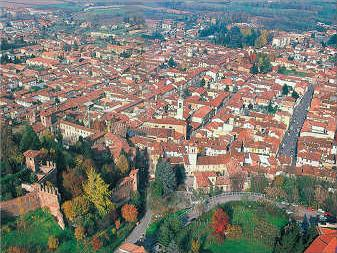

- Coat of arms

- Location within Italy Location within Lombardy
- Coordinates: 45°11′N 9°29′E
- Country: Italy
- Region: Lombardy
- Metropolitan city: Milan (MI)
- Frazioni: Mariotto

Government
  - Mayor: Pasquale Luigi Belloni

Area
  - Total: 16.39 km^{2} (6.33 sq mi)
- Elevation: 80 m (260 ft)

Population (31 December 2010)
  - Total: 7,375
  - Density: 450.0/km^{2} (1,165/sq mi)
- Demonym: Banini
- Time zone: UTC+1 (CET)
  - Summer (DST): UTC+2 (CEST)
- Postal code: 20078
- Dialing code: 0371
- Patron saint: St. Colombanus
- Saint day: November 21
- Website: Official website

San Colombano al Lambro (Lodigiano: San Culumban al Lamber) is a comune (municipality) in the Metropolitan City of Milan, in the Italian region of Lombardy, located about 40 kilometres (25 mi) southeast of Milan.

San Colombano al Lambro is an exclave of the province of Milan at the junction between the Pavia and Lodi provinces. The exclave arose when the province of Lodi was carved out of the province of Milan, but a referendum in San Colombano indicated the locals' wish to stay in Milan.

San Colombano al Lambro borders the following municipalities: Borghetto Lodigiano, Graffignana, Livraga, Miradolo Terme, Orio Litta, and Chignolo Po, none of which are in the Metropolitan City of Milan.

== San Colombano DOC ==
The comune of San Colombano al Lambro is home to the denominazione di origine controllata (DOC) wine which includes 100 hectares (250 acres) producing a single red wine. The wine is a blend of 30–45% Croatina, 25–40% Barbera, 5–15% Uva Rara and up to 15% of other local red grape varieties to round out the blend. All grapes destined for DOC wine production need to be harvested to a yield no greater than 11 tonnes/ha. The finished wine must attain a minimum alcohol level of 11% in order to be labelled with the San Colombano DOC designation.
