= Gaetano Michetti =

Italian bishop

- Bishop of Pesaro
- Church: Roman Catholic Church
- See: Roman Catholic Diocese of Pesaro
- In office: 1975–1998
- Predecessor: Luigi Carlo Borromeo
- Successor: Angelo Bagnasco
- Previous post: Auxiliary bishop of Fermo

Orders
- Ordination: 8 August 1948
- Consecration: 15 August 1961 by Mgr Norberto Perini

Personal details
- Born: 5 March 1922 Corridonia, Italy
- Died: 13 December 2007 (aged 85) Corridonia, Italy
- Denomination: Roman Catholic Church
- Occupation: bishop
- Profession: priest

Styles of Gaetano Michetti
- Reference style: His Excellency
- Spoken style: Your Excellency
- Religious style: Bishop

Gaetano Michetti (3 March 1922 – 13 December 2007) was the bishop of the Roman Catholic Diocese of Pesaro in Italy. Appointed by Pope John XXIII in July 1975, he served until 3 January 1998.

== Biography ==
Born in Corridonia in 1922, Michetti was ordained as a Catholic priest on 8 August 1948. He was appointed Auxiliary bishop of Fermo on 31 May 1961 and was ordained titular Bishop of Irenopilis in Cilicia on 15 August 1961. He was council father during the four sessions of Second Vatican Council.

He was appointed coadjutor bishop of Pesaro on 7 July 1973, and installed as bishop after monsignor Luigi Borromeo's death, on 4 July 1975.

Bishop Gaetano Michetti died on 13 December 2007, at the age of 85.

Catholic Church titles
Preceded by Georges Jacquot	Titular Bishop of Irenopolis; 1961–1975	Succeeded by vacant

Catholic Church titles
Preceded by Luigi Carlo Borromeo	Bishop of Pesaro; 1975–1998	Succeeded by Angelo Bagnasco
