= Miradolo Terme =

Miradolo Terme Miradò
- Comune
- Comune di Miradolo Terme
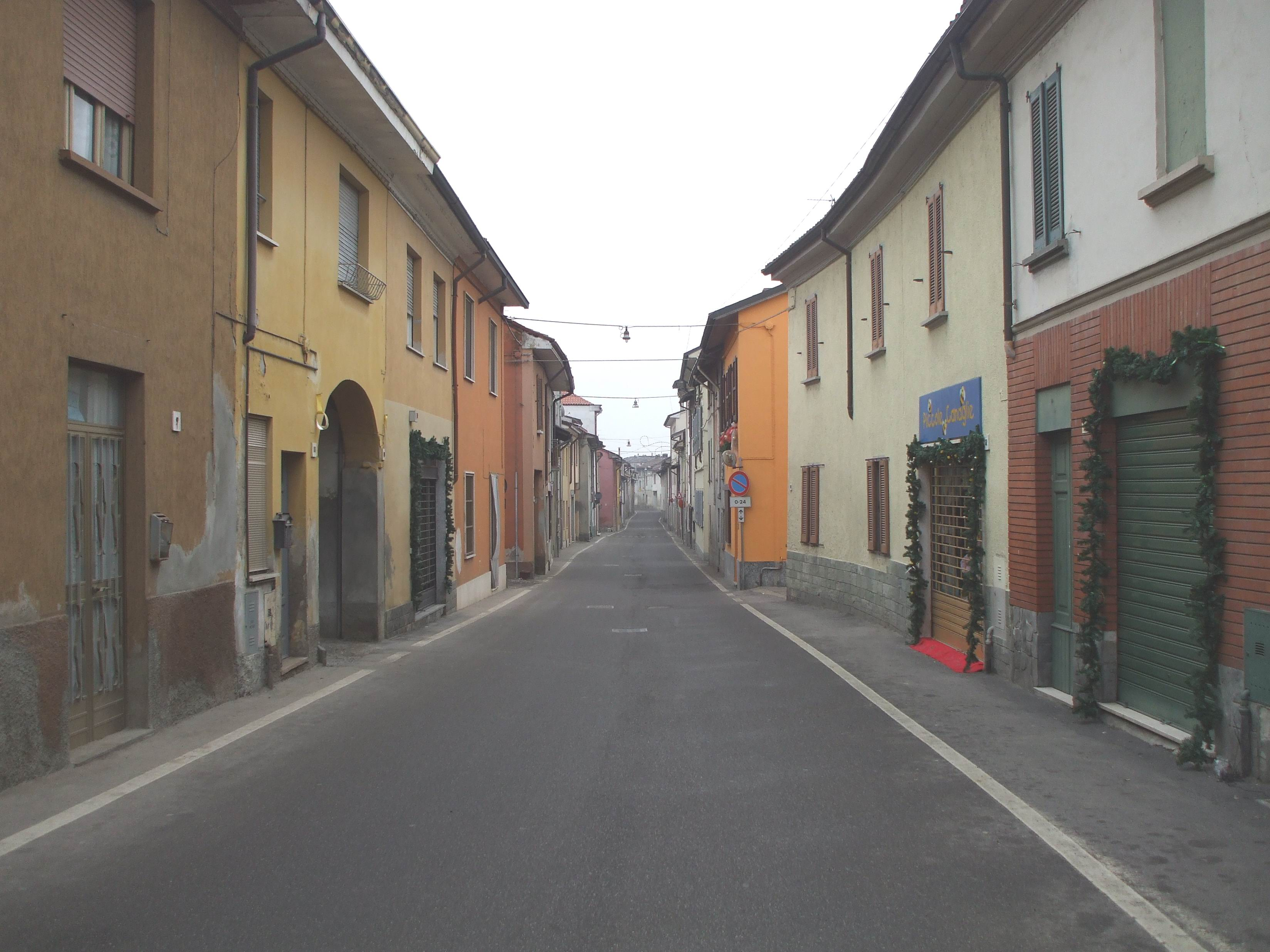

- Location within Italy Location within Lombardy
- Coordinates: 45°9′N 9°29′E
- Country: Italy
- Region: Lombardy
- Province: Pavia (PV)
- Frazioni: Camporinaldo, Terme di Miradolo

Government
  - Mayor: Gianpaolo Troielli

Area
  - Total: 9.56 km^{2} (3.69 sq mi)
- Elevation: 72 m (236 ft)

Population (31 October 2017)
  - Total: 3,738
  - Density: 391/km^{2} (1,010/sq mi)
- Demonym: Miradolesi
- Time zone: UTC+1 (CET)
  - Summer (DST): UTC+2 (CEST)
- Postal code: 27010
- Dialing code: 0382
- Website: Official website

Miradolo Terme (Western Lombard: Miradò) is a comune (municipality) in the Province of Pavia in the Italian region Lombardy, located about 45 km southeast of Milan and about 25 km east of Pavia.

Miradolo Terme borders the following municipalities: Chignolo Po, Graffignana, Inverno e Monteleone, San Colombano al Lambro, Sant'Angelo Lodigiano, Santa Cristina e Bissone.
