= Marco Tasca =

Italian Catholic Archbishop

His Excellency, The Most Reverend Marco Tasca O.F.M. Conv.
- Archbishop of Genoa
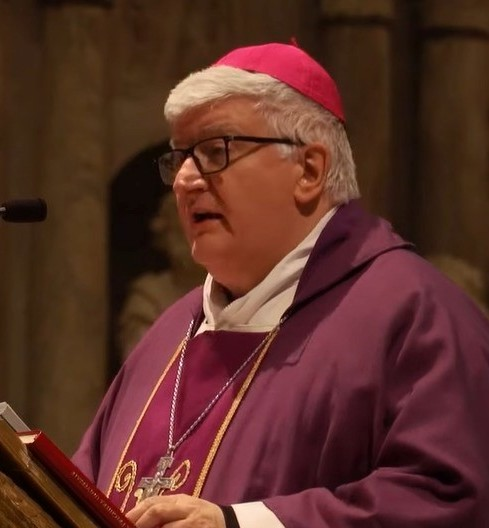
- Archbishop Tasca in 2022
- Church: Roman Catholic Church
- Archdiocese: Genoa
- See: Genoa
- Appointed: 8 May 2020
- Installed: 11 July 2020
- Predecessor: Angelo Bagnasco
- Previous posts: Minister General of the Order of Friars Minor Conventual (2007-19); Grand Chancellor of the Pontifical Theological Faculty of Saint Bonaventure (2007-19)

Orders
- Ordination: 19 March 1983 by Filippo Franceschi
- Consecration: 11 July 2020 by Angelo Bagnasco

Personal details
- Born: Marco Tasca; 9 June 1957 (age 69) Sant'Angelo di Piove di Sacco, Padua, Italy
- Education: Salesian Pontifical University
- Motto: Ostende nobis Patrem
- Coat of arms

Styles of Marco Tasca
- Reference style: His Grace
- Spoken style: Your Excellency
- Religious style: Archbishop

Marco Tasca OFM Conv (born 9 June 1957) is an Italian prelate of the Catholic Church who served as the 119th Minister General of the Conventual Franciscans from 2007 to 2019. He was appointed the Metropolitan Archbishop of Genoa on 8 May 2020.

== Early life ==
Marco Tasca was born on 9 June 1957 in Sant’Angelo di Piove in the province of Padua, Italy, to Antonio and Santa Tasca. He entered the Order at Camposampiero on 29 September 1968 and attended lower primary school and the Seraphic Seminary of Pedavena in the province of Belluno and then the Lyceum-Minor Seminary in Brescia.

He made his novitiate at the Basilica of St. Anthony (1976-1977) and professed his first vows on 17 September 1977. He then studied theology at the Sant'Antonio Dottore Theological Institute, earning his bachelor's degree in 1982. On 28 November 1981 he professed his solemn vows. In 1982, he lived at the Seraphicum in Rome while attending courses toward a licentiate at the Salesian Pontifical University.

== Priest ==
He was ordained to the priesthood on 19 March 1983 in his home town by Bishop Filippo Franceschi, Bishop of Padua. In 1986 he completed his licentiate in Psychology at the Salesian Pontifical University, and two years later a licentiate in Pastoral Theology at the same University. After serving as parish priest in Roma-EUR, he became rector of the Minor Seminary in Brescia from 1988 to 1994 and rector of the Post-Novitiate in Padua from 1994 to 2001.

He was Professor of Psychology and Catechetics at the “Sant’Antonio Dottore” Theological Institute. At the Provincial Chapter of 2001, he was elected Custos Capitularis and Guardian of Camposampiero at Padua. He held those posts until he was elected Minister Provincial in 2005. He was vice-president of the Major Superiors' Conference of Italy and President of the Franciscan Movement of the North-East.

On 26 May 2007, at the Sacred Convent in Assisi, the Ordinary General Chapter elected him to a six-year term as Minister General, the 119th successor to St. Francis. He was reelected to a second term in January 2013. He ended his service as Minister General on 17 May 2019.

He was elected on three occasions as one of ten members of the Union of Superiors General to participate in a Synod of Bishops, at the 2012 Synod on the New Evangelization, at the 2015 Synod on the Family, and at the 2018 Synod on Youth. In 2018 he supported the idea of allowing women superiors to participate as well.

== Archbishop ==
On 8 May 2020, Pope Francis appointed him to succeed Cardinal Angelo Bagnasco as Archbishop of Genoa. He received his episcopal consecration on 11 July by Cardinal Angelo Bagnasco and simultaneously took formal canonical possession of the archdiocese.
