= Angelo Bagnasco =

Italian Cardinal of the Catholic Church (born 1943)

His Eminence Angelo Bagnasco
- Cardinal; Archbishop Emeritus of Genoa
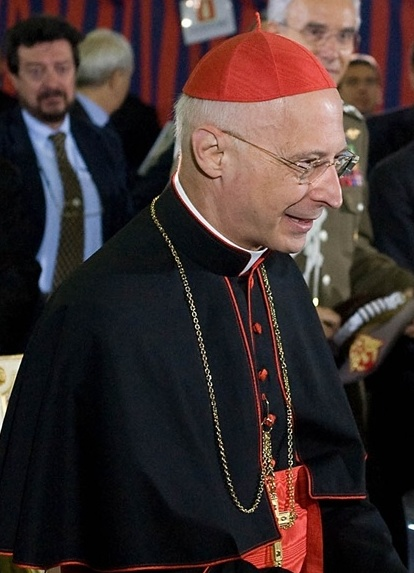
- Bagnasco in 2010
- Church: Roman Catholic Church
- Archdiocese: Genoa
- See: Genoa
- Appointed: 29 August 2006
- Installed: 24 September 2006
- Term ended: 8 May 2020
- Predecessor: Tarcisio Bertone, S.D.B.
- Successor: Marco Tasca, O.F.M. Conv.
- Other post: Cardinal-Priest of Gran Madre di Dio (2007-)
- Previous posts: Bishop of Pesaro (1998–2000); Archbishop of Pesaro (2000–2003); Archbishop of the Military Ordinariate in Italy (2003–2006)

Orders
- Ordination: 29 June 1966 by Giuseppe Siri
- Consecration: 7 February 1998 by Dionigi Tettamanzi
- Created cardinal: 24 November 2007 by Pope Benedict XVI
- Rank: Cardinal-Priest

Personal details
- Born: Angelo Bagnasco; 14 January 1943 (age 83) Pontevico, Brescia, Kingdom of Italy
- Denomination: Roman Catholic
- Education: University of Genoa
- Motto: Christus spes mea (Christ my hope)

- Coat of arms

Styles of Angelo Bagnasco
- Reference style: His Eminence
- Spoken style: Your Eminence
- Religious style: Cardinal
- Informal style: Cardinal
- See: Genoa

Angelo Bagnasco (Italian pronunciation: [ˈandʒelo baɲˈɲasko]; born 14 January 1943) is an Italian Cardinal of the Catholic Church. He was Archbishop of Genoa from 2006 to 2020. He was President of the Italian Episcopal Conference (CEI) from 2007 to 2017 and was elevated to the rank of cardinal in 2007. He was President of the Council of the Bishops' Conferences of Europe (CCEE) from 2016 to 2021.

He is considered to be conservative in his views and a theological ally of his predecessor in the CEI, Cardinal Camillo Ruini.

== Biography ==
=== Early life ===
Bagnasco was born to Alfredo and Rosa Bagnasco in Pontevico (Brescia), where his family was evacuated during World War II. He said in an interview: "I became an altar boy in my parish in the historic center of Genoa, in Piazza Sarzano, when I was six years old. My old parish priest was Abbot Giovanni Battista Gazzolo, first, and afterwards Monsignor Carlo Viacava while his deputy was a young curate, Don Gianni Zamiti—the latter two are still alive and overjoyed that their little altar boy has become their archbishop—who supervised us on afternoons in the parish club where we went to play. The desire to become a priest was born precisely when I was in elementary school, but I didn’t confide it to anybody. Afterwards I went to a co-ed middle school, always with that desire in my heart".

=== Priesthood ===
He attended the liceum of classics at the archdiocesan seminary of Genoa, and was ordained to the priesthood on 29 June 1966 by Cardinal Giuseppe Siri. While a priest in Genoa, he received a degree in philosophy from the University of Genoa, served as professor of metaphysics and contemporary atheism at the Theological Faculty of Northern Italy, and led the archdiocesan liturgical and catechesis offices. He was once the diocesan representative to the FUCI (the Italian Catholic Federation of University Students) and led efforts for the pastoral care of students in the region.

=== Early episcopal career ===
Bagnasco was appointed Bishop of Pesaro on 3 January 1998. He received his episcopal consecration on the following 7 February from Archbishop Dionigi Tettamanzi, with Bishops Gaetano Michetti and Giacomo Barabino serving as co-consecrators. Bagnasco became Metropolitan Archbishop of the same see on 11 March 2000.

Since 2001, he has held several posts within the Italian Episcopal Conference (CEI), including president of the administrative board of its newspaper Avvenire, and secretary for schools and universities. On 20 June 2003, he was appointed Archbishop of the Military Ordinariate of Italy. He described his appointment as "totally unexpected" and that he accepted it "with surprise and some trepidation. First of all because the military world was totally unknown to me, and then because it was a matter of an extensive diocese, covering the whole country and even beyond, with our soldiers on missions to foreign countries".

Following the resignation of Tarcisio Bertone, Bagnasco was appointed Archbishop of Genoa on 29 August 2006. He was installed on the following 24 September. He defended Pope Benedict XVI in the Regensburg controversy.

On 7 March 2007, Benedict XVI selected Bagnasco to succeed Camillo Ruini as President of the Italian Episcopal Conference for a five-year term. "The choice is a compromise between two of Benedict's two most influential policy-movers—Bagnasco is a confirmed Ruini-ite, 'but Bertone likes him,' as one op put it."

On 27 June 2007, Bagnasco, along with several other prelates, attended a briefing at the Apostolic Palace on Pope Benedict's impending motu proprio allowing wider celebration of the Tridentine Mass. Two days after this meeting, on 29 June, he and forty-five others were invested with the pallium, a woolen vestment reserved for metropolitan bishops, by Benedict in St. Peter's Basilica.

=== Cardinal and curial assignments ===
On 17 October 2007, Pope Benedict announced that Bagnasco would be created cardinal in a consistory on 24 November. He was created Cardinal-Priest of Gran Madre di Dio. On 12 June 2008, Benedict appointed him to the Congregation for the Oriental Churches, the Congregation for Divine Worship and the Discipline of the Sacraments.

Also in 2008, Bagnasco was appointed by Pope Benedict XVI to the Congregation for Bishops, and he was named a member again, when Pope Francis overhauled the membership of that Congregation in 2013.

Bagnasco took part in the papal conclave of 2013 that elected Pope Francis, where he was seen as a possible contender (papabili) for the papacy by some media.

In February 2018, Pope Francis extended Bagnasco's tenure in Genoa for two years beyond the normal retirement age of 75. On 8 May 2020, Pope Francis accepted Bagnasco's resignation as Archbishop of Genoa and named Marco Tasca to succeed him.

=== Health ===
On 28 September 2021, shortly after returning from the International Eucharistic Congress in Budapest, he was diagnosed with COVID-19 and admitted to the infectious disease unit of Genoa's Galliera Hospital. He said he had been vaccinated and knew he could still be infected. On 30 September, the hospital reported that his general condition was good and the outlook positive. Several other cardinals have recovered from the virus. He was discharged from hospital on 8 October.

== Views and theological positions ==
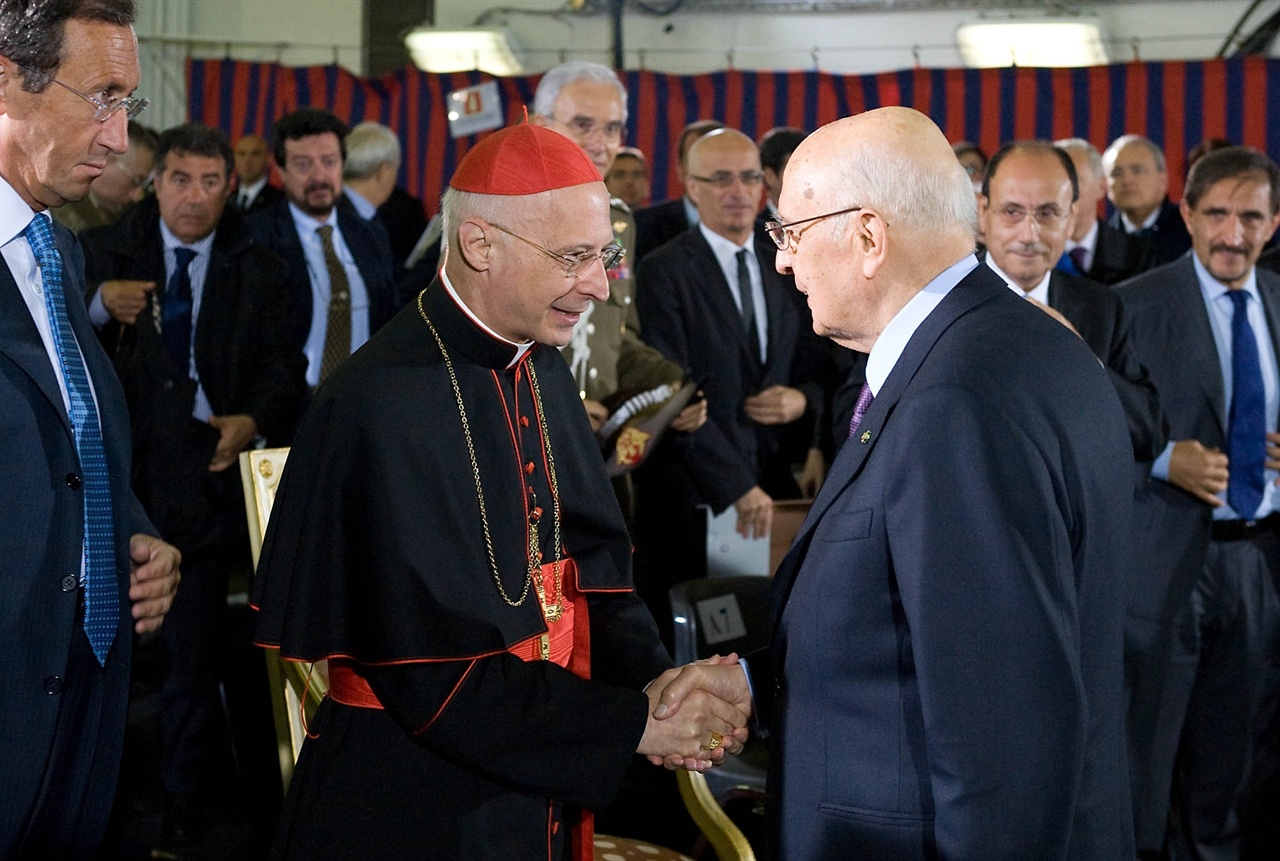
Cardinal Bagnasco with the President of the Italian Republic Giorgio Napolitano in 2010.

=== Abortion ===
Bagnasco has expressed strong opposition to abortion, especially with regards to the RU-486 pill, which has abortive effects on the embryo.

=== Euthanasia ===
Bagnasco said in remarks to the Italian news agency ANSA in 2016 that "it pains us as Christians but it also pains us as persons" that euthanasia was permitted in Belgium to enable a terminally ill 17 year-old minor to die.

He has in the past said that euthanasia is an action with the absence of love and that it follows a secular criteria rather than a religious one.

=== Opposition to gay rights ===
In April 2007, following a condemnation of same-sex unions—in which he said, "Why say 'no' to forms of legally recognised co-habitation which create alternatives to the family? Why say 'no' to incest? Why say 'no' to the paedophile party in Holland?"—Bagnasco allegedly found himself the target of death threats. The Genoa police department, while dismissing any serious cause for concern, assigned an armed officer to guard him. Alfonso Pecoraro Scanio from the Italian Green Party, a vocal supporter of gay rights, said Bagnasco had made a "grave, foolish comparison which offends millions of people".

Bagnasco later condemned a ruling made by the Tuscan courts in 2014 which, for the first time in Italy, recognized the marriage of a gay couple who had wed in New York. He has also described gay civil unions and same-sex marriages as a “Trojan horse” that fundamentally weaken the institution of the family.

In 2019, Bagnasco cancelled three separate public prayers of reparation for a gay pride parade that was set to be held in the archdiocese but offered no explanation for his decision. His decision was, however, met with some criticism as was the lack of explanation for his action.

=== Social teaching ===
Bagnasco affirmed that each man has the right to be employed. He has also advised that the flexibility of the workforce has to be limited.

Catholic Church titles
Preceded by Gaetano Michetti	Archbishop of Pesaro; 3 January 1998 – 20 June 2003	Succeeded by Piero Coccia
Preceded by Giuseppe Mani	Military Ordinary of Italy; 20 June 2003 – 29 August 2006	Succeeded by Vincenzo Pelvi
Preceded by Tarcisio Cardinal Bertone, SDB	Archbishop of Genoa; 29 August 2006 – 8 May 2020	Succeeded by Marco Tasca
Preceded by Camillo Ruini	President of the Italian Episcopal Conference; 7 March 2007 - 24 May 2017	Succeeded by Gualtiero Bassetti
