= Gran Madre di Dio, Rome =

Gran Madre di Dio
- Chiesa della Gran Madre di Dio; Church of the Great Mother of God (in English); Praecelsae dei Genitrici Dicatum (in Latin)
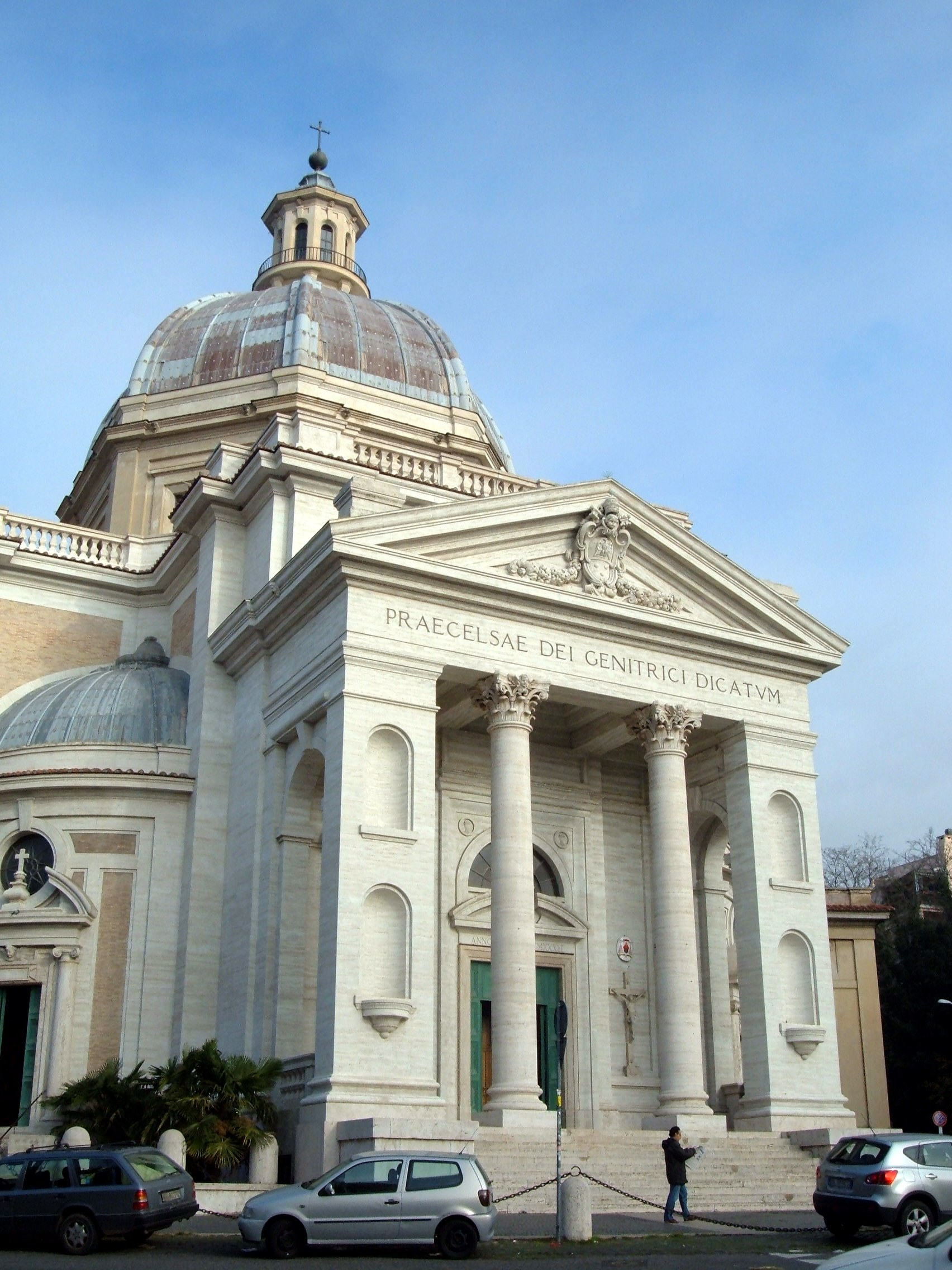
- Facade
- Click on the map for a fullscreen view
- 41°56′19″N 12°27′56″E
- Location: Via Cassia 1, Rome
- Country: Italy
- Denomination: Roman Catholic
- Tradition: Roman Rite
- Website: Official website

History
- Status: Titular church
- Dedication: Mary, mother of Jesus
- Consecrated: 1937

Architecture
- Architect: Cesare Bazzani
- Architectural type: Church
- Style: Neoclassical
- Groundbreaking: 1931
- Completed: 1933

Administration
- District: Lazio
- Province: Rome

Gran Madre di Dio (Great Mother of God) is a cardinal's titular church in Rome. Its current holder is Angelo Bagnasco, Archbishop of Genoa, who was created a cardinal on 24 November 2007. The church was established as a titular church in 1965. The monumental temple was built by Pope Pius XI in 1931, in memory of the celebrations held to commemorate the 1,500 anniversary of the Council of Ephesus, which established the dogma of the divine motherhood and her perpetual virginity of Mary, in the patristic tradition and popular devotion since From the Church. It was built between 1931 and 1933 by architect Cesare Bazzani, built by Clemente Busiri Vici. It is the seat of the parish of the same name, erected by Pius XI on 1 December 1933, the year of Jubilee extraordinary redemption, in the Apostolic Constitution "Quo perennius" .

== Description ==
Exterior

The main entrance is preceded by a portico with a triangular pediment supported by two columns with Corinthian capitals and side pillars. Within the pediment is the coat of arms of Pope Pius XI; There are also two side entrances that open into two bodies of curvilinear factory, placed at the side of the porch. Two small lateral bell towers, each topped with flank the large dome resting on an octagonal drum and is topped by a lantern, also octagonal. In the drum they are opened eight large rectangular windows, one per side.

Interior

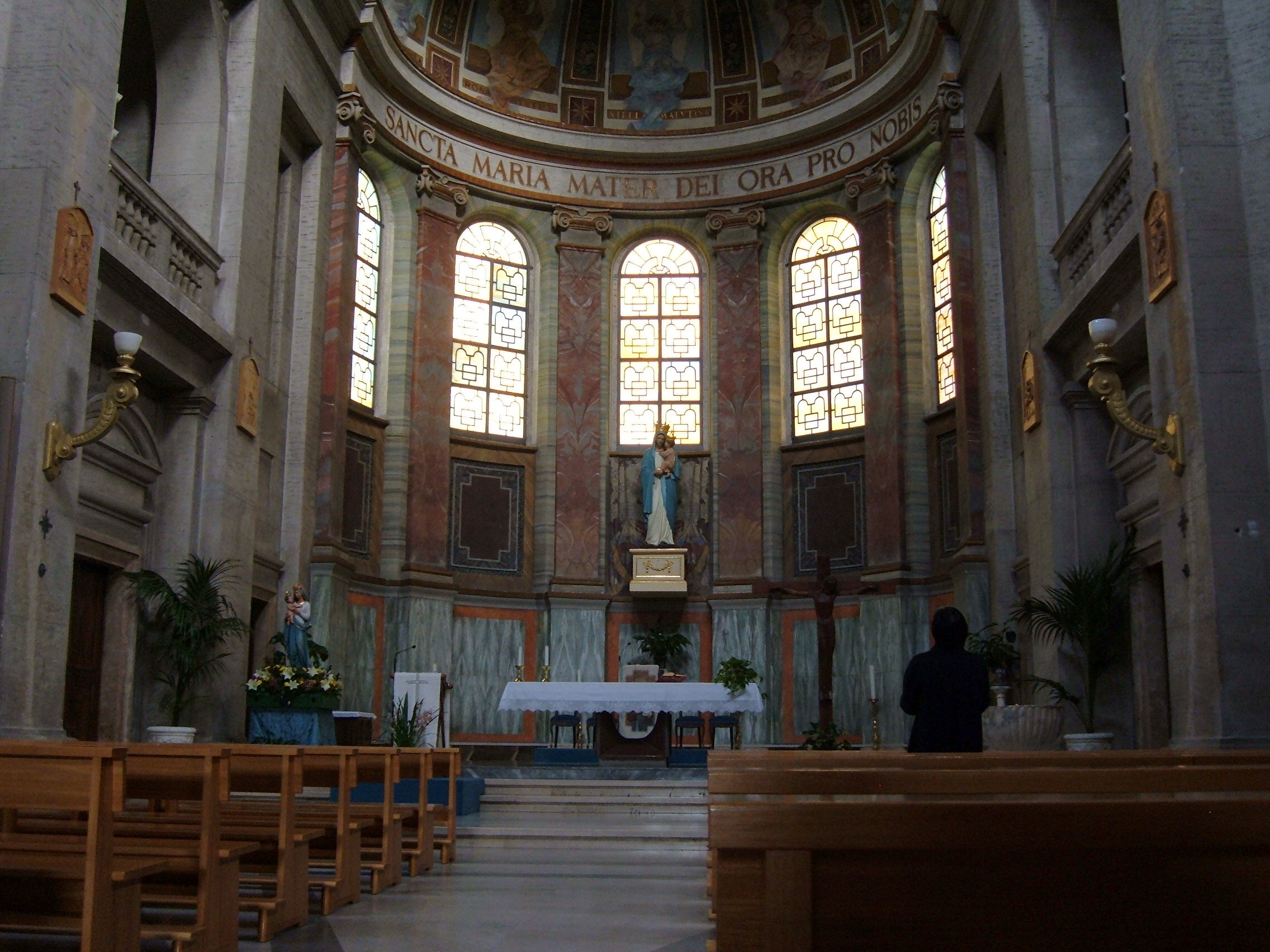
Altar of the church

The church has a Greek cross plan. semicircular apse has five arched windows, above which, within a frame, is the inscription SANCTA MARIA MATER DEI ORA PRO NOBIS (Holy Mary, Mother of God, pray for us). In the apse there is a fresco of the painter Federico Morgante.

== List of Cardinal Protectors ==
- Agnelo Rossi 22 Feb 1965 appointed - 25 Jun 1984 appointed Cardinal-Bishop of Sabina e Poggio Mirteto
- Angel Suquía Goicoechea 25 May 1985 appointed - 13 Jul 2006 died
- Angelo Bagnasco 24 November 2007 appointed - present
