= Bonaventura Porta =

Italian bishop

- Bishop of Pesaro
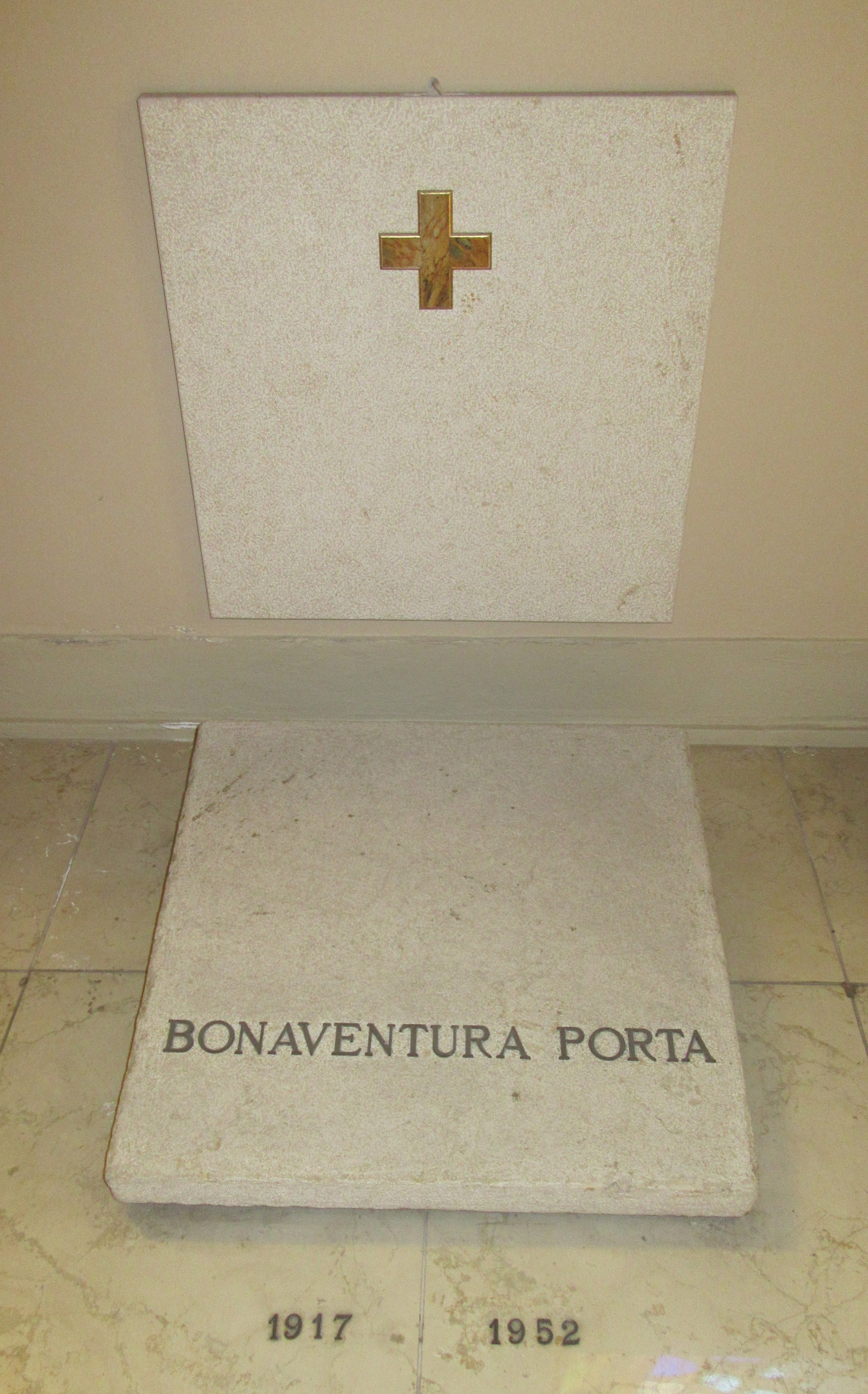
- Church: Roman Catholic Church
- See: Roman Catholic Diocese of Pesaro
- In office: 1917–1952
- Predecessor: Paolo Marco Tei O.F.M. Cap.
- Successor: Luigi Carlo Borromeo

Orders
- Ordination: March 22, 1890
- Consecration: June 24, 1917 by Mgr Carlo Liviero

Personal details
- Born: 21 October 1866 Castelmassa, Italy
- Died: 15 December 1953 (aged 87) Pesaro, Italy
- Denomination: Roman Catholic Church
- Occupation: bishop
- Profession: priest

Styles of Bonaventura Porta
- Reference style: His Excellency
- Spoken style: Your Excellency
- Religious style: Bishop

Bonaventura Porta (October 21, 1866 – December 15, 1953) was the Italian Bishop of the Roman Catholic Diocese of Pesaro from his appointment by Pope Benedict XV on March 22, 1917, until December 28, 1952.

He died on December 15, 1953.

== Bibliography ==
- Dante Simoncelli, Teodoro Briguglio, Mons. Bonaventura Porta vescovo di Pesaro (1917-1953), in Atti delle celebrazioni e del convegno nel cinquantesimo anniversario della morte: Pesaro 13–15 December 2003

Catholic Church titles
Preceded by Paolo Marco Tei O.F.M. Cap.	Bishop of Pesaro; 1917–1952	Succeeded by Luigi Carlo Borromeo
Preceded by John Roderick MacDonald	Titular Bishop of Ancusa; 1952–1953	Succeeded by François Xavier Arthur Florent Morilleau
