= Policlinico San Matteo =

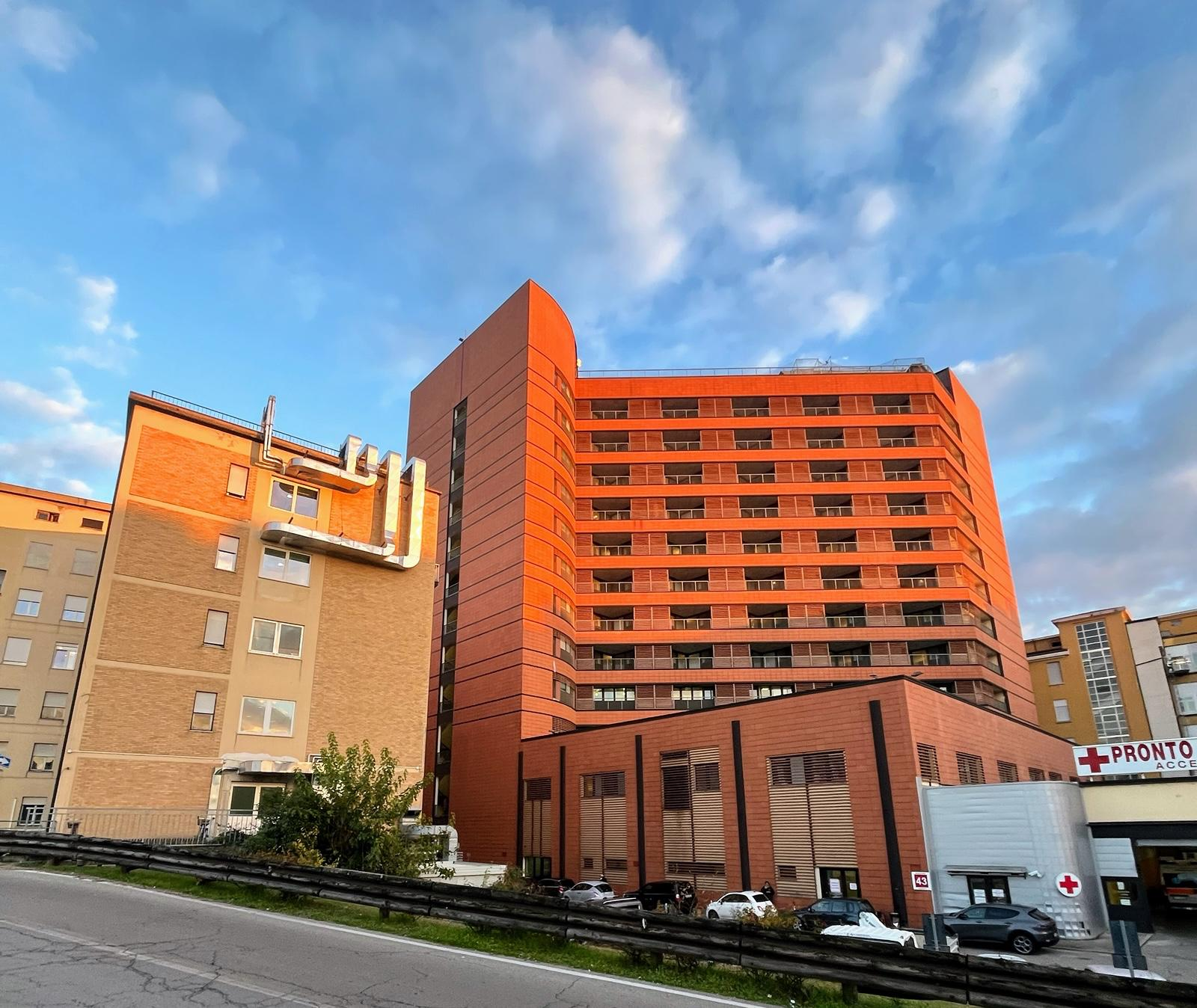

Geography
- Location: Viale Camillo Golgi, 19, Lombardy, Pavia, Italy
- Coordinates: 45.1977619°N 9.1449817°E

Organisation
- Care system: Public
- Type: Teaching
- Affiliated university: University of Pavia

Services
- Emergency department: Yes
- Beds: 1024

Helipads
- Helipad: Yes

History
- Founded: June 1449

Links
- Website: www.sanmatteo.org
- Lists: Hospitals in Italy

Policlinico San Matteo, known as Fondazione IRCCS Policlinico San Matteo, founded in 1449, is one of the oldest and largest teaching hospitals in Italy. It is located in the city of Pavia, about 35 km south of Milan. The hospital has over 3,300 physicians, as well as more than 1,000 beds. In 2016, the hospital handled 36,500 admissions, 13.7% of those are from outside Pavia, 99,000 admissions to the emergency department and 2.1 million outpatient services.

The Foundation is a scientific Institute for Research, Hospitalization and Health Care (IRCCS), which means that, alongside clinical activity, it promotes research programs with predominantly translational purposes. In 2016, the hospital published 651 scientific journals and conducted 455 clinical trials.

The hospital is affiliated with University of Pavia, Faculty of Medicine, where every year, hundreds of medical students from the University perform clinical rotations during their clinical years.

== History ==
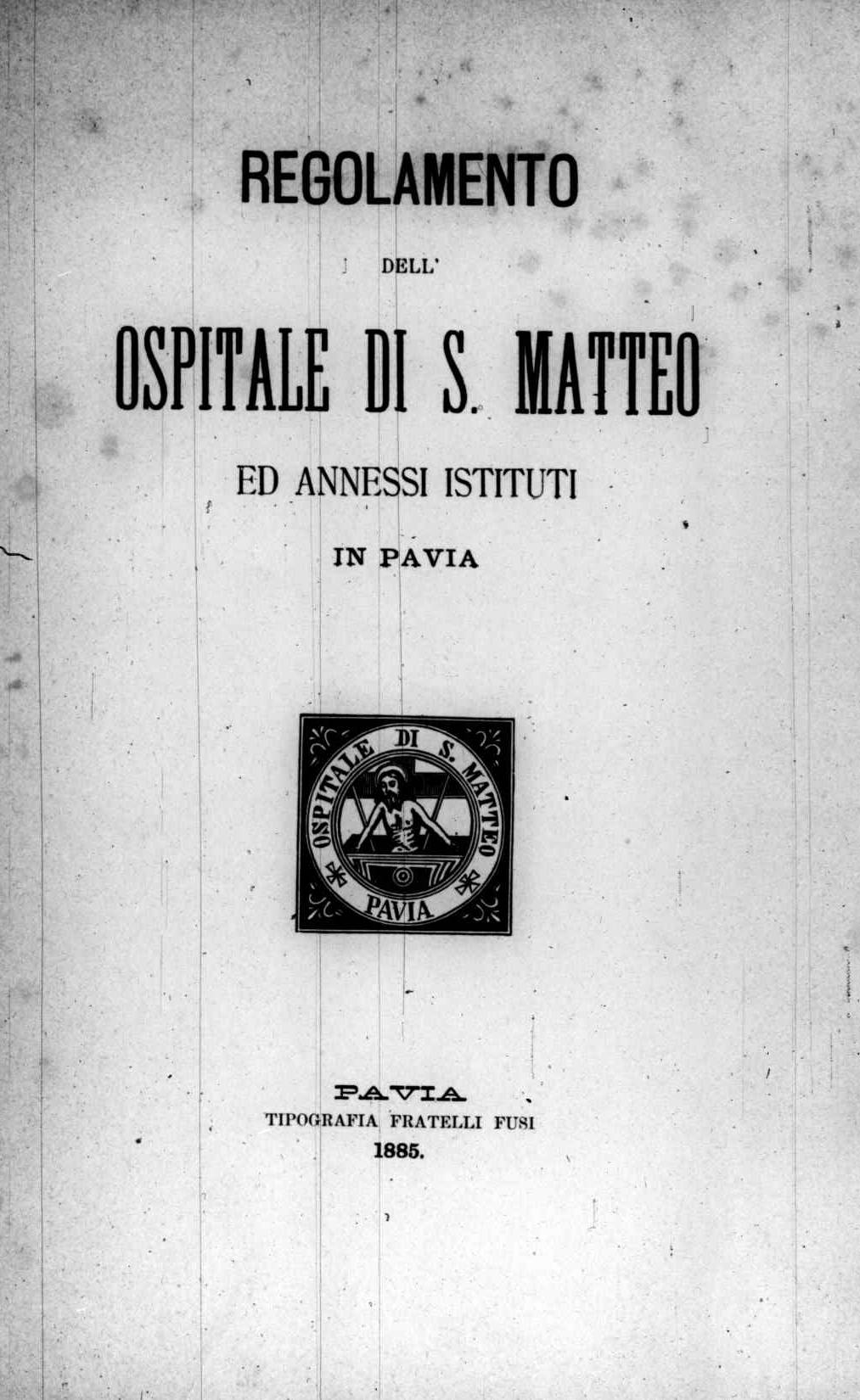
Regolamento dell'ospitale di S.Matteo, 1885

The hospital's foundation was first laid on 29 June 1449, and it was built at the request of Dominic of Catalonia, a Dominican friar with the full support of the secular and ecclesiastical authority.

The hospital was named after San Matteo in September 1449, as it was built where the Benedictine monastery of San Matteo was located. It was also called the Pietà Hospital to underline that the pietas, intended as love of neighbor, must be the guiding principle of the activity carried out within it. The hospital emblem used at the time, which depicted the rising of Christ from the dead half-way up from the sarcophagus, had been used for centuries and is still being used today. The emblem signified the Christian spirit and charity that inspired Domenico da Catalogna to build the hospital.

The hospital had close ties with the local church and the Holy See. In fact, the hospital was exempted from paying tax by the episcopal order of Pope Nicholas V on 13 September 1449.

On 31 October 2013, a new hospital building (called DEA, Department of Emergency and Acceptance) was opened. It has 9 storeys and 2 underground floors, with a total area of over 65,000 sqm. About 6,000 sqm of space is dedicated for emergency medicine.

== Research ==
Policlinico San Matteo is known for excellent research studies and therapies in areas such as cardiology, cardiac surgery, hematology, infectious diseases, orthopedics, pediatric oncology, robotic surgery, and the study of rare diseases.

The hospital also hosts Pavia Cord Blood Bank which stores umbilical cord blood. It is used for stem cell transplants and research.

In 2009, Johns Hopkins Medicine International signed a three-year agreement with Policlinico San Matteo to collaborate in the field of cardiac surgery, through exchange of talents and expertise.

In 2016, the hospital publishes 651 scientific journals and conducted 455 clinical trials.

In collaboration with the University of Pavia, the hospital is able to procure 3D-printed patient-specific anatomical models in order to assist with general surgeries.

== Awards and recognitions ==
The IRCCS Policlinico San Matteo Foundation ranks 8th in Italy and 134th globally in the "World's Best Hospitals 2026" ranking, published by Newsweek in collaboration with Statista, evaluating over 2500 hospitals in over 30 countries.

== See also ==
- University of Pavia
