= Archdiocese of Pesaro =

Roman Catholic archdiocese in Italy

Coordinates: 43.9108°N 12.9145°E

Archdiocese of Pesaro Archidioecesis Pisaurensis

Catholic
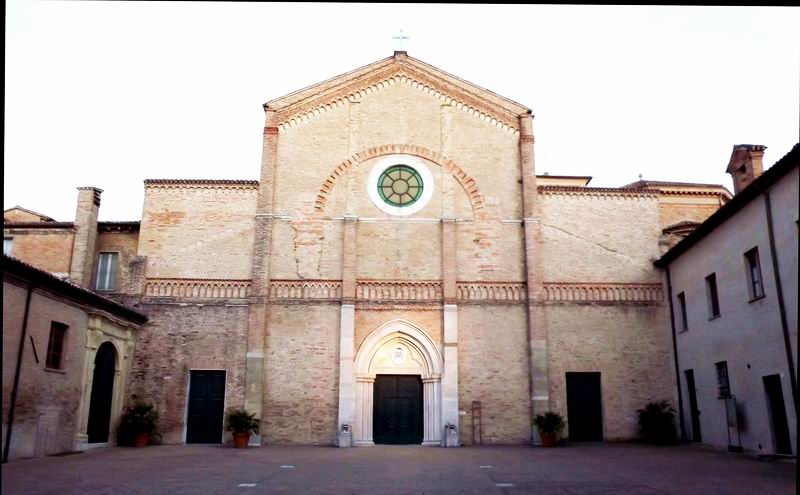
- Pesaro Cathedral

Location
- Country: Italy
- Ecclesiastical province: Pesaro

Statistics
- Area: 287 km^{2} (111 sq mi)
- Population: Total; Catholics: (as of 2021); 130,952; 122,392 (93.5%)
- Parishes: 54

Information
- Denomination: Catholic Church
- Rite: Roman Rite
- Established: 3rd century
- Cathedral: Basilica Cattedrale di S. Maria Assunta
- Secular priests: 47 (diocesan); 32 (Religious Orders); 12 Permanent Deacons

Current leadership
- Pope: Leo XIV
- Archbishop: Sandro Salvucci
- Bishops emeritus: Piero Coccia

Map

Website
- www.arcidiocesipesaro.it

The Archdiocese of Pesaro (Latin: Archidioecesis Pisaurensis) is a Latin diocese of the Catholic Church in central Italy. Its see at Pesaro was elevated to the status of metropolitan archiepiscopal see in 2000. Its suffragans are the Diocese of Fano-Fossombrone-Cagli-Pergola and the Archdiocese of Urbino-Urbania-Sant'Angelo in Vado.

== History ==
The first bishop, Florentius, is said to have governed this see in the middle of the second century, while the bishop, Decentius, according to tradition, suffered martyrdom under Diocletian. Bishop Heradianus was at the Council of Sardica in 343.

Other bishops were:

- Germanus, who went with Cresconius di Todi to Constantinople in 497 as legate of Pope Anastasius II;
- Felix, whom Gregory the Great brought to trial;
- Maximus (649);
- Benenatus, a legate to the Sixth General Council (680);
- Stabilinus (769);
- Adelberto (998), founder of the monastery of S. Tommaso in Folgia, where Pope Clement II died in 1047;
- Pietro (1070), who was deposed, being a partisan of the schism of Frederick Barbarossa;
- Bartolomeo (1218);
- Omodio (1346);
- Biagio Geminelli (1354);
- Leale Malatesta (1370);
- Cardinal Antonio Casini (1406);
- Paris de Grassis (1513–28)
- Giacomo Simonetta (1528–1535)
- Ludovico Simonetta (1537–1561)
- Giulio Simonetta (1560), was at the Council of Trent, and founded the seminary;
- Gian Lucido Palombara (1658), consecrated the new cathedral;
- Umberto Radicati (1742);
- Cardinal Gennaro Antonio de' Simoni (1775);
- Andrea Mastai-Ferretti (1806).
- Ottavio Zollio (1822–1824)
- Felice Bezzi (1824–1828)
- Filippo Monacelli (1828–1839)
- Francesco Canali (1839–1846)
- Giovanni Carlo Gentili (1847–1854)
  - Vacant See (1854–1856)
- Clemente Fares (1856–1896)
- Carlo Bonaiuti (1896–1904)
- Paolo Marco Tei, O.F.M.Cap. (1904–1916)
- Bonaventura Porta (1917–1952)
- Luigi Carlo Borromeo (1952–1975)
- Gaetano Michetti (1975–1998)
- Angelo Bagnasco (1998–2003)
- Piero Coccia (2004–2022)
- Sandro Salvucci (2022–Present)
