= Politics of Liguria =

Italian regional politics

The politics of Liguria, a region of Italy, takes place in the framework of an "anomalous presidential" representative democracy or prime-ministerial system with an executive presidency, whereby the President of Regional Government is the head of government, and of a pluriform multi-party system. Executive power is exercised by the Regional Government. Legislative power is vested in both the government and the Regional Council.

== Executive branch ==
The Regional Government (Giunta Regionale) is presided by the President of the Region (Presidente della Regione), who is elected for a five-year term, and is composed by the President and the Ministers (Assessori), who are currently 11, including a Vice President.

=== List of presidents ===
Presidents elected by the Regional Council (1970–1995)

#	Name	Term of office		Political party	Legislature
1	Gianni Dagnino	15 September 1970	14 April 1975	DC	I (1970)
2	Giorgio Luciano Verda	14 April 1975	29 July 1975	DC	I (1970)
3	Angelo Carossino	29 July 1975	4 July 1979	PCI	II (1975)
4	Armando Magliotto	4 July 1979	28 October 1980	PCI	II (1975)
5	Giovanni Persico	28 October 1980	27 September 1981	PRI	III (1980)
6	Alberto Teardo	27 September 1981	25 May 1983	PSI	III (1980)
7	Rinaldo Magnani	25 May 1983	9 October 1985	PSI	III (1980)
7	Rinaldo Magnani	9 October 1985	14 March 1990	PSI	IV (1985)
8	Renzo Muratore	14 March 1990	28 September 1990	PSI	IV (1985)
9	Giacomo Gualco	28 September 1990	14 January 1992	DC	V (1990)
10	Edmondo Ferrero	14 January 1992	20 July 1994	DC	V (1990)
11	Giancarlo Mori	20 July 1994	6 June 1995	PPI	V (1990)

Directly-elected presidents (since 1995)

N.	Portrait	President	Term of office		Tenure (Years and days)	Party	Composition	Legislature
11		Giancarlo Mori (1938–2019)	6 June 1995	12 May 2000	4 years, 332 days	Italian People's Party	PDS–PPI–PdD–FdV	VI (1995)
12		Sandro Biasotti (1948– )	12 May 2000	14 April 2005	4 years, 337 days	Forza Italia	FI–AN–LN–CDC	VII (2000)
13		Claudio Burlando (1954– )	14 April 2005	7 April 2010	10 years, 58 days	Democrats of the Left / Democratic Party	Ulivo/PD–PRC–PdCI–FdV–IdV	VIII (2005)
13		Claudio Burlando (1954– )	7 April 2010	11 June 2015	10 years, 58 days	Democrats of the Left / Democratic Party	PD–IdV–UDC–FdS–SEL–FdV	IX (2010)
14		Giovanni Toti (1968– )	11 June 2015	12 October 2020	9 years, 45 days	Forza Italia	LN–FI–FdI	X (2015)
14		Giovanni Toti (1968– )	12 October 2020	26 July 2024	9 years, 45 days	Cambiamo! / Us Moderates	C!–Lega–FdI–FI	XI (2020)
–		Alessandro Piana (1972– )	26 July 2024	9 November 2024	106 days	Lega	C!–Lega–FdI–FI	XI (2020)
15		Marco Bucci (1959– )	9 November 2024	incumbent	2 years, 13 days	Independent	FdI–NM–Lega–FI	XII (2024)

== Legislative branch ==
The Regional Council of Liguria (Consiglio Regionale della Liguria) is composed of 40 members. 32 councillors are elected in provincial constituencies by proportional representation using the largest remainder method with a Droop quota and open lists, while 8 councillors (elected in bloc) come from a "regional list", including the President-elect. One seat is reserved for the candidate who comes second. If a coalition wins more than 50% of the total seats in the Council with PR, only 4 candidates from the regional list will be chosen and the number of those elected in provincial constituencies will be 36. If the winning coalition receives less than 40% of votes special seats are added to the Council to ensure a large majority for the President's coalition.

The Council is elected for a five-year term, but, if the President suffers a vote of no confidence, resigns or dies, under the simul stabunt, simul cadent clause introduced in 1999 (literally they will stand together or they will fall together), also the Council is dissolved and a snap election is called.

=== Current composition ===
The Regional Council of Liguria is currently composed of the following political groups:

Party	Seats	Status
Democratic Party	9 / 31	In opposition
Brothers of Italy	5 / 31	In government
Liguria Wins – Us Moderates	4 / 31	In government
League	3 / 31	In government
Forza Italia	3 / 31	In government
Pride Liguria – Bucci for President	3 / 31	In government
Greens and Left Alliance	2 / 31	In opposition
Five Star Movement	1 / 31	In opposition
Orlando for President	1 / 31	In opposition

== Local government ==
=== Provinces ===
Province	Inhabitants	President	Party	Election
Metropolitan City of Genoa	840,934	Silvia Salis (metropolitan mayor)	Ind. (centre-left)	2025
Imperia	213,743	Claudio Scajola	FI	2021
La Spezia	219,693	Pierluigi Peracchini	Ind. (centre-right)	2019
Savona	276,261	Mauro Demichelis	FI	2026

=== Municipalities ===
Provincial capitals

Municipality	Inhabitants	Mayor	Party	Election
Genoa	577,587	Silvia Salis	Ind. (centre-left)	2025
Imperia	42,506	Claudio Scajola	Ind. (centre-right)	2018
La Spezia	93,259	Pierluigi Peracchini	Ind. (centre-right)	2017
Savona	60,469	Marco Russo	PD	2021

== Parties and elections ==
=== Latest regional election ===
The latest regional election took place on 28–29 October 2024.

Marco Bucci, the independent centre-right mayor of Genoa, narrowly defeated former minister Andrea Orlando of the Democratic Party, retaining the region for the centre-right.

27–28 October 2024 Ligurian regional election results
Candidates	Votes	%	Seats	Parties	Votes	%	Seats
Marco Bucci	291,093	48.77	1	Brothers of Italy	84,816	15.08	5
Marco Bucci	291,093	48.77	1	Bucci for President Liguria Wins	53,208	9.46	3
Marco Bucci	291,093	48.77	1	League	47,652	8.47	3
Marco Bucci	291,093	48.77	1	Forza Italia	44,849	7.98	3
Marco Bucci	291,093	48.77	1	Ligurian Pride	32,061	5.70	3
Marco Bucci	291,093	48.77	1	Union of the Centre	7,294	1.30	–
Marco Bucci	291,093	48.77	1	Popular Alternative	1,929	0.34	–
Marco Bucci	291,093	48.77	1	Total	271,809	48.34	17
Andrea Orlando	282,669	47.36	1	Democratic Party	160,063	28.47	8
Andrea Orlando	282,669	47.36	1	Greens and Left Alliance	34,716	6.17	2
Andrea Orlando	282,669	47.36	1	Andrea Orlando List	29,808	5.30	1
Andrea Orlando	282,669	47.36	1	Five Star Movement	25,659	4.56	1
Andrea Orlando	282,669	47.36	1	Civic Reformist Pact	9,813	1.75	–
Andrea Orlando	282,669	47.36	1	Head-on Ligurians	9,127	1.62	–
Andrea Orlando	282,669	47.36	1	Total	269,186	47.87	12
Nicola Morra	5,223	0.88	–	United for the Constitution	4,922	0.88	–
Nicola Rollando	5,079	0.85	–	For the Alternative	4,920	0.87	–
Francesco Toscano	5,071	0.85	–	Sovereign Popular Democracy	4,709	0.84	–
Marco Ferrando	2,099	0.35	–	Workers' Communist Party	1,813	0.32	–
Maria Antonietta Cella	2,076	0.35	–	Northern People’s Party	1,674	0.30	–
Davide Felice	1,855	0.31	–	Force of the People	1,696	0.30	–
Alessandro Rosson	1,668	0.28	–	Independence!	1,570	0.28	–
Total candidates	596,833	100.00	2	Total parties	562,299	100.00	29
Blank and invalid votes	15,915	2.58					
Registered voters/turnout	1,341,693	45.97					
Source: Ministry of the Interior – Election in Liguria
