= Elections in Liguria =

This page gathers the results of elections in Liguria.

== Regional elections ==
=== Latest regional election ===
The latest regional election took place on 28–29 October 2024.

Marco Bucci, the independent centre-right mayor of Genoa, narrowly defeated former minister Andrea Orlando of the Democratic Party, retaining the region for the centre-right.

27–28 October 2024 Ligurian regional election results
Candidates	Votes	%	Seats	Parties	Votes	%	Seats
Marco Bucci	291,093	48.77	1	Brothers of Italy	84,816	15.08	5
Marco Bucci	291,093	48.77	1	Bucci for President Liguria Wins	53,208	9.46	3
Marco Bucci	291,093	48.77	1	League	47,652	8.47	3
Marco Bucci	291,093	48.77	1	Forza Italia	44,849	7.98	3
Marco Bucci	291,093	48.77	1	Ligurian Pride	32,061	5.70	3
Marco Bucci	291,093	48.77	1	Union of the Centre	7,294	1.30	–
Marco Bucci	291,093	48.77	1	Popular Alternative	1,929	0.34	–
Marco Bucci	291,093	48.77	1	Total	271,809	48.34	17
Andrea Orlando	282,669	47.36	1	Democratic Party	160,063	28.47	8
Andrea Orlando	282,669	47.36	1	Greens and Left Alliance	34,716	6.17	2
Andrea Orlando	282,669	47.36	1	Andrea Orlando List	29,808	5.30	1
Andrea Orlando	282,669	47.36	1	Five Star Movement	25,659	4.56	1
Andrea Orlando	282,669	47.36	1	Civic Reformist Pact	9,813	1.75	–
Andrea Orlando	282,669	47.36	1	Head-on Ligurians	9,127	1.62	–
Andrea Orlando	282,669	47.36	1	Total	269,186	47.87	12
Nicola Morra	5,223	0.88	–	United for the Constitution	4,922	0.88	–
Nicola Rollando	5,079	0.85	–	For the Alternative	4,920	0.87	–
Francesco Toscano	5,071	0.85	–	Sovereign Popular Democracy	4,709	0.84	–
Marco Ferrando	2,099	0.35	–	Workers' Communist Party	1,813	0.32	–
Maria Antonietta Cella	2,076	0.35	–	Northern People’s Party	1,674	0.30	–
Davide Felice	1,855	0.31	–	Force of the People	1,696	0.30	–
Alessandro Rosson	1,668	0.28	–	Independence!	1,570	0.28	–
Total candidates	596,833	100.00	2	Total parties	562,299	100.00	29
Blank and invalid votes	15,915	2.58					
Registered voters/turnout	1,341,693	45.97					
Source: Ministry of the Interior – Election in Liguria

=== List of previous regional elections ===
- 1970 Ligurian regional election
- 1975 Ligurian regional election
- 1980 Ligurian regional election
- 1985 Ligurian regional election
- 1990 Ligurian regional election
- 1995 Ligurian regional election
- 2000 Ligurian regional election
- 2005 Ligurian regional election
- 2010 Ligurian regional election
- 2015 Ligurian regional election
- 2020 Ligurian regional election
