= Lega Liguria =

- Secretary: Edoardo Rixi
- Founded: 1989 (as UL); 1991 (as LNL); 2020 (as LL)
- Ideology: Regionalism; Federalism; Populism
- National affiliation: Lega Nord (1991–2020); Lega per Salvini Premier (2020–present)
- Regional Council of Liguria: 7 / 30
- Chamber of Deputies (Liguria seats): 4 / 16
- Senate (Liguria seats): 3 / 8

Website
- https://legaliguria.com

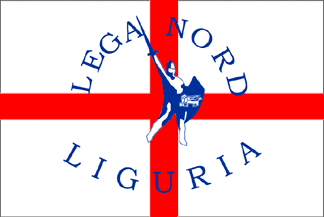
Historical party flag of Lega Nord Liguria

Flag of Liguria proposed by Lega Liguria

Lega Liguria (English: League Liguria), whose complete name is Lega Liguria per Salvini Premier (English: League Liguria for Salvini Premier), is a regionalist political party active in Liguria. Established in 1987, it was one of the founding "national" sections of Lega Nord (LN) in 1991 and has been the regional section of Lega per Salvini Premier (LSP) in Liguria since 2020.

Since 2015 Edoardo Rixi has been the party's leader.

== History ==
The party was founded in 1987 by Bruno Ravera as Ligurian Union (Uniun Ligure).

The party participated to the 1989 European Parliament election as part of the coalition Lega Lombarda – Alleanza Nord. In 1989–1990 it took part in the process of federating the Northern regionalist parties, ahead of the regional elections. In February 1991 it was one of the founding members of Lega Nord, taking the current name, and since then it has been the "national" section of that party in Liguria. At the 1992 general election the LNL obtained 14.3% of the vote in Liguria, making it one of the early strongholds of the LN.

Despite being smaller than other founding members, the LNL played a big role in party politics since the beginning. In 1993 Maurizio Balocchi was appointed federal administrative secretary (i.e. treasurer). In February 2010, after the sudden death of Balocchi, Francesco Belsito, Ligurian and close aide of Balocchi, was appointed in his place. The LNL has also been represented in Silvio Berlusconi's governments by Sergio Cappelli (1994–1995), Balocchi (2001–2006, 2008–2010), Belsito (2010–2012) and Sonia Viale (2010–2012).

Over the years, the party suffered several splits, including one led by Ravera, who was welcomed back in 1998 and appointed "president for life". In 2001 a group of keen separatists led by Vincenzo Matteucci formed the Ligurian Independentist Movement (MIL).

In the 2010 regional election the LNL gained 10.2% of the vote and three regional councillors.

In April 2012 Belsito was charged of money-laundering, embezzlement and fraud at the expenses of the federal party and was thus expelled. Being Belsito a Ligurian, the scandal hit the LNL and its leadership. Francesco Bruzzone, who had been secretary since 1998, decided to step down after that he was asked to do so by leading members of the party. Viale secured the support of 80% of delegates (115 votes) in a party congress, against the 20% (28) of her opponent Giacomo Chiappori, and was elected in his place, while Bruzzone was elected president and Andrea Corrado, who had been president since 1992, honorary president.

In the 2015 regional election the LNL obtained its best result ever with 20.3% of the vote and was instrumental for the election of Forza Italia's Giovanni Toti as President of Liguria. In fact, the LNL had renounced to run its own candidate, Edoardo Rixi, in favour of Toti and won almost twice the votes of Forza Italia in the election itself. As a result, the LNL returned to participate in the regional government, led by its leader Viale, who was appointed vice president and minister of Health by Toti, while Rixi minister of Economic Development. Contextually, Bruzzone was elected President of the Regional Council.

In December 2015, during a national congress, Rixi (144 votes, 61% of the total) beat and succeeded to Viale (83) as secretary.

In the 2018 general election the party confirmed its strength in Liguria with 19.9% of the vote.

Following the formation of Lega per Salvini Premier and the 2019 federal congress of the LN, after which the latter became practically inactive, in February 2020 the LL was re-established as Lega Liguria per Salvini Premier in order to become the regional section of the new party. Founding members included Rixi and Bruzzone.

In the 2020 regional election the party won 17.1% of the vote.

== Popular support ==
Lega Nord Liguria has suffered a steady decline in term of votes since 1992 (when it obtained 14.3% at the regional level), but has recently re-gained strength and reached 20.3% in the 2015 regional election, its best result until that moment. The party is usually stronger in the western part of the region, indeed in 2015 it got 22.7% of the vote in the Province of Imperia, 24.4% in Savona, 18.7% in Genoa and 18.5% in La Spezia.

The electoral results of Lega Nord Liguria in the region are shown in the tables below.

1990 regional	1992 general	1994 general	1995 regional	1996 general	1999 European	2000 regional	2001 general	2004 European	2005 regional	2006 general	2008 general	2009 European	2010 regional
6.1	14.3	11.4	6.6	10.2	3.7	4.3	3.9	4.1	4.7	3.7	6.8	9.9	10.2

2013 general	2014 European	2015 regional	2018 general	2019 European	2020 regional	2022 general	2024 European
2.3	5.6	20.3	19.9	33.9	17.1	9.3	8.9

== Election results ==
Chamber of Deputies
Election year	Votes	%	Seats	+/-	Leader
1992	176,547 (3rd)	14.29	3 / 19	▲3	Bruno Ravera
1994	139,946 (3rd)	11.39	6 / 20	▲3	Bruno Ravera
1996	119,171 (5th)	10.20	1 / 19	▼5	Giacomo Chiappori
2001	43,276 (6th)	3.91	0 / 20	▼1	Francesco Bruzzone
2006	40,350 (6th)	3.70	0 / 17	-	Francesco Bruzzone
2008	68,337 (3rd)	6.83	2 / 17	▲2	Francesco Bruzzone
2013	21,862 (6th)	2.34	0 / 16	▼2	Sonia Viale
2018	171,352 (2nd)	19.91	4 / 16	▲4	Edoardo Rixi

Senate of the Republic
Election year	Votes	%	Seats	+/-	Leader
1992	150,890 (3rd)	13.91	2 / 10	▲2	Bruno Ravera
1994	with PdL		3 / 9	▲1	Bruno Ravera
1996	124,124 (5th)	11.93	1 / 9	▼1	Giacomo Chiappori
2001	with CdL		1 / 9	-	Francesco Bruzzone
2006	39,015 (8th)	3.82	0 / 8	▼1	Francesco Bruzzone
2008	61,797 (3rd)	6.57	1 / 8	▲1	Francesco Bruzzone
2013	21,162 (6th)	2.42	0 / 8	▼1	Sonia Viale
2018	164,831 (2nd)	20.52	3 / 8	▲3	Edoardo Rixi

Regional Council
Election year	Votes	%	Seats	+/-	Leader/candidate
1990	71,311 (4th)	6.13	2 / 40	▲2	Bruno Ravera
1995	62,755 (5th)	6.54	2 / 45	-	Giacomo Chiappori
2000	38,104 (5th)	4.32	1 / 40	▼1	Sandro Biasotti
2005	38,060 (6th)	4.67	1 / 40	-	Sandro Biasotti
2010	76,265 (3rd)	10.22	3 / 40	▲2	Sandro Biasotti
2015	109,209 (3rd)	20.25	5 / 30	▲2	Giovanni Toti
2020	107,340 (3rd)	17.14	6 / 30	▲1	Giovanni Toti

== Leadership ==
- Secretary: Bruno Ravera (1987–1994), Giacomo Chiappori (1994–1998), Francesco Bruzzone (1998–2012), Sonia Viale (2012–2015), Edoardo Rixi (2015–present, commissioner 2020–2023)
- President: Andrea Corrado (1992–2012), Francesco Bruzzone (2012–2020)
- President for life: Bruno Ravera (1998–2017)
- Honorary President: Andrea Corrado (2012–2018)
