= List of presidents of Liguria =

This is the list of presidents of Liguria since 1970.

Presidents elected by the Regional Council (1970–1995)

#	Name	Term of office		Political party	Legislature
1	Gianni Dagnino	15 September 1970	14 April 1975	DC	I (1970)
2	Giorgio Luciano Verda	14 April 1975	29 July 1975	DC	I (1970)
3	Angelo Carossino	29 July 1975	4 July 1979	PCI	II (1975)
4	Armando Magliotto	4 July 1979	28 October 1980	PCI	II (1975)
5	Giovanni Persico	28 October 1980	27 September 1981	PRI	III (1980)
6	Alberto Teardo	27 September 1981	25 May 1983	PSI	III (1980)
7	Rinaldo Magnani	25 May 1983	9 October 1985	PSI	III (1980)
7	Rinaldo Magnani	9 October 1985	14 March 1990	PSI	IV (1985)
8	Renzo Muratore	14 March 1990	28 September 1990	PSI	IV (1985)
9	Giacomo Gualco	28 September 1990	14 January 1992	DC	V (1990)
10	Edmondo Ferrero	14 January 1992	20 July 1994	DC	V (1990)
11	Giancarlo Mori	20 July 1994	6 June 1995	PPI	V (1990)

Directly-elected presidents (since 1995)

N.	Portrait	President	Term of office		Tenure (Years and days)	Party	Composition	Legislature
11		Giancarlo Mori (1938–2019)	6 June 1995	12 May 2000	4 years, 332 days	Italian People's Party	PDS–PPI–PdD–FdV	VI (1995)
12		Sandro Biasotti (1948– )	12 May 2000	14 April 2005	4 years, 337 days	Forza Italia	FI–AN–LN–CDC	VII (2000)
13		Claudio Burlando (1954– )	14 April 2005	7 April 2010	10 years, 58 days	Democrats of the Left / Democratic Party	Ulivo/PD–PRC–PdCI–FdV–IdV	VIII (2005)
13		Claudio Burlando (1954– )	7 April 2010	11 June 2015	10 years, 58 days	Democrats of the Left / Democratic Party	PD–IdV–UDC–FdS–SEL–FdV	IX (2010)
14		Giovanni Toti (1968– )	11 June 2015	12 October 2020	9 years, 45 days	Forza Italia	LN–FI–FdI	X (2015)
14		Giovanni Toti (1968– )	12 October 2020	26 July 2024	9 years, 45 days	Cambiamo! / Us Moderates	C!–Lega–FdI–FI	XI (2020)
–		Alessandro Piana (1972– )	26 July 2024	9 November 2024	106 days	Lega	C!–Lega–FdI–FI	XI (2020)
15		Marco Bucci (1959– )	9 November 2024	incumbent	1 year, 308 days	Independent	FdI–NM–Lega–FI	XII (2024)
