= Sergio Castellaneta =

Italian politician (1932–2018)

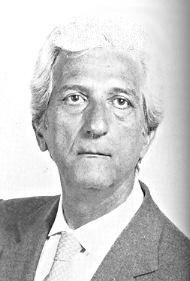

Member of the Chamber of Deputies
- In office 23 April 1992 – 9 May 1996

Personal details
- Born: 16 November 1932 Genoa, Italy
- Died: 18 March 2018 (aged 85) Genoa, Italy
- Party: Northern League
- Occupation: Medic, politician

Sergio Castellaneta (16 November 1932 – 18 March 2018) was an Italian politician.

== Biography ==
Castellaneta was graduated in Medicine, with specializations in Angiology and Laboratory Analysis. He has been an historical exponent of the Genoese center-right, entering politics in 1990 as a candidate of the Northern League to the city council of Genoa, where he was elected city councilor with 4,000 preferences.

In 1992, he was elected Deputy with 28,000 votes of preference and participated in the work of the Health and Social Affairs Committee, after just two years the Legislature falls and is again presented by the Northern League and re-elected Deputy with 35,000 votes of preference. In 1994 he was elected president of the Order of Physicians of the Province of Genoa, a position he held until 2004 when he presented his resignation for personal reasons.

In May 1994, contrary to the party's decision to support the Berlusconi I Cabinet, Castellaneta left the League and joined the mixed group, where he remained until the end of the legislature in 1996.

In 1997 he founded a civic list ("Genova Nuova") and presented himself as a candidate for mayor of Genoa; although he reached the ballot with 72,000 votes of personal preference, he loses against Giuseppe Pericu, for a few thousand votes. It is reported for intemperances during the election campaign, like a fight with a journalist of a local TV in the studios of the broadcaster Telegenova. He tried once more to run for mayor in 2002 ranking himself third.

In 1998 his civic list takes the name of "New Liguria" which supports among other things two battle horses: the transformation of Liguria into a region with special status and the elimination of the hot cycle of the Ilva steel mill in Cornigliano, considered a damage to the environment and the redevelopment of the area; with his list he comes to the regional elections of 2000 in support of the candidate governor Sandro Biasotti and is elected regional councilor and president of the statute commission. In 2002 he came out of the majority because the Ligurian health programs are not suited to what he had always supported, both as a municipal councilor, as a deputy, and as president of the Order of Physicians. He supported the abrogative referendum of the law on assisted procreation, as well as proposals for the legalization of prostitution.

He was also close to the Radical Party of Marco Pannella, since he has always voted in favor of abortion and divorce and against the law on assisted procreation and against the future law on living wills, considered highly limiting, and enrolled in the Transnational Radical Party; Castellaneta was among the first signatories for the presentation of the Pannella-Bonino list of the Italian Radicals for the regional elections of 2010 in Liguria, although the list did not reach then the quorum of signatures.

In 1998 he participated in a petition against the government of Slobodan Milošević and then supported the Kosovo war, as opposed to his former party, the Northern League, close to the Serbian president.

Castellaneta has abandoned politics after the predictable defeat of Biasotti in the regional elections of 2005 against Claudio Burlando.

Federalist and anti-Islamist he disagreed with the numerous problems related to justice, health, institutional reforms; he criticized the management of the Northern League by Umberto Bossi, showing closeness to Euroscepticism and other issues with the new League leader Matteo Salvini. He was once again detached from the world of the League in controversy with the choice of Salvini not to nominate Edoardo Rixi as president of the Liguria region in favor of Forza Italia candidate Giovanni Toti.
