= 2024 Ligurian regional election =

Election in Italy

- 27–28 October 2024

All 31 seats to the Regional Council of Liguria
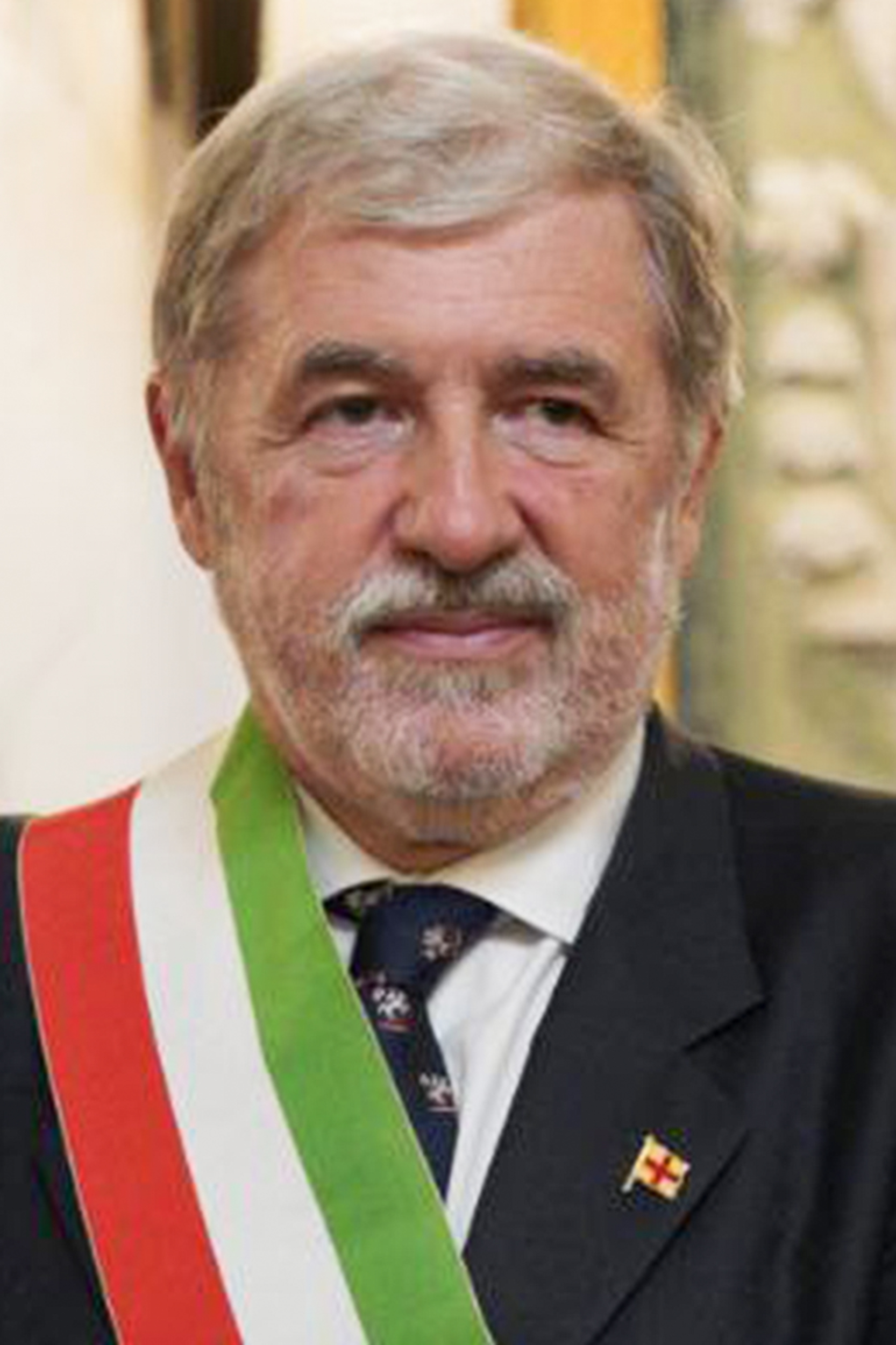

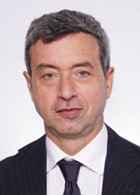
	Majority party	Minority party
Leader	Marco Bucci	Andrea Orlando
Party	Independent	Democratic Party
Alliance	Centre-right	Centre-left
Seats won	18	13
Seat change	▼1	▲1
Popular vote	291,093	282,669
Percentage	48.8%	47.4%
Swing	▼7.3%	▲8.5%
President before election
Giovanni Toti
Us Moderates
Elected President
Marco Bucci
Independent

The 2024 Ligurian regional election took place in Liguria, Italy on 27–28 October 2024. The snap election was called after the resignation of incumbent president, Giovanni Toti, following an investigation into corruption, particularly regarding favors to local businessmen in Genoa in exchange for financial support in local elections in 2021 and 2022.

Bucci won the electoral competition by outperforming his opponent in Ventimiglia, Sanremo, Rapallo among other centers where his coalition reached 50 and 60% of the votes, while Orlando performed strongly in Genova, despite Bucci being the city mayor there, and his home town of La Spezia, while also winning in Savona as well.

The race brought significant attention as it was considered a test for the national government but also for the center-right coalition in the region.

== Electoral system ==
The Regional Council of Liguria is composed of 30 members, plus the president elect. The president elect is the candidate winning a plurality of votes at the election. Within the council, 24 seats are elected in provincial constituencies by proportional representation. The remaining 6 councillors are assigned as a majority bonus if the winning candidate has less than 18 seats, otherwise they are distributed among the losing coalitions.

A single list must get at least 3% of the votes in a province in order to access the proportional distribution of seats, unless the list is connected to a coalition with more than 5% of the vote.

== Parties and candidates ==
Political party or alliance	Constituent lists	Previous result		Candidate
Political party or alliance	Constituent lists	%	Seats	Candidate
Centre-right coalition	Bucci for President Liguria Wins (incl. NM)	22.6	7	Marco Bucci
Centre-right coalition	League	17.1	6	Marco Bucci
Centre-right coalition	Brothers of Italy	10.9	3	Marco Bucci
Centre-right coalition	Forza Italia	5.3	1	Marco Bucci
Centre-right coalition	Union of the Centre	0.7	0	Marco Bucci
Centre-right coalition	Popular Alternative	—N/a	—N/a	Marco Bucci
Centre-right coalition	Ligurian Pride	—N/a	—N/a	Marco Bucci
Centre-left coalition	Democratic Party	19.9	6	Andrea Orlando
Centre-left coalition	Five Star Movement	7.8	2	Andrea Orlando
Centre-left coalition	Greens and Left Alliance (incl. SI, EV, Pos)	3.9	1	Andrea Orlando
Centre-left coalition	Civic Reformist Pact (incl. A, PRI, PER, MRE)	—N/a	—N/a	Andrea Orlando
Centre-left coalition	Head-on Ligurians (incl. PSI)	—N/a	—N/a	Andrea Orlando
Centre-left coalition	Andrea Orlando List	—N/a	—N/a	Andrea Orlando
For the Alternative (incl. PRC, PCI, PaP)		—N/a	—N/a	Nicola Rollando
Northern People’s Party		—N/a	—N/a	Maria Antonietta Cella
United for the Constitution		—N/a	—N/a	Nicola Morra
Workers' Communist Party		—N/a	—N/a	Marco Ferrando
Sovereign Popular Democracy		—N/a	—N/a	Francesco Toscano
Independence!		—N/a	—N/a	Alessandro Rosson
Force of the People		—N/a	—N/a	Davide Felice

== Opinion polls ==
=== Candidates ===
Date	Polling firm/ Client	Sample size	Bucci	Orlando	Morra	Others	Undecided	Lead
28 Oct 2024	Opinio (exit poll)	–	47.0–51.0	45.5–49.5	0.0–2.0	–	–	1.5
28 Oct 2024	SWG (exit poll)	–	46.0–50.0	45.0–49.0	–	4.0–6.0	–	1.0
24 Sep–3 Oct 2024	BiDiMedia	1,000	47.5	47.0	2.0	3.5	23.0	0.5
1 Oct 2024	Noto	–	46.0	46.0	–	6.0 – 10.0	31.0	Tie
18 Sep 2024	Tecnè	–	47.0	50.0	3.0	0.0	46.0	3.0
18 Sep 2024	Tecnè	–	47.0	53.0	–	0.0	48.0	6.0

Hypothetical polls

Date	Polling firm/ Client	Sample size	Centre-right	Orlando	Others	Lead
Sep 2024	Tecnè	–	46.0	54.0 (Note: Generic centre-left candidate)	–	8.0
Sep 2024	Tecnè	–	47.0 (Note: Carlo Bagnasco)	53.0	–	6.0
Sep 2024	Tecnè	–	48.0 (Note: Ilaria Cavo)	52.0	–	4.0
Sep 2024	Tecnè	–	45.0 (Note: Lorenzo Cuocolo)	55.0	–	10.0
Sep 2024	Tecnè	–	45.0 (Note: Pietro Piciocchi)	55.0	–	10.0
Sep 2024	Tecnè	–	47.0 (Note: Edoardo Rixi)	53.0	–	6.0
Sep 2024	Tecnè	–	45.0 (Note: Marco Scajola)	55.0	–	10.0
5–7 Aug 2024	Euromedia (Note: This poll was commissioned by a political party, Giovanni Toti Liguria Committee)	–	51.3 (Note: Edoardo Rixi)	48.7	–	2.6
5–7 Aug 2024	Euromedia	–	52.3 (Note: Ilaria Cavo)	47.7	–	4.6
5–7 Aug 2024	Euromedia	–	50.4 (Note: Pietro Piciocchi)	49.6	–	0.8
5–7 Aug 2024	Euromedia	–	52.1 (Note: Marco Scajola)	47.9	–	4.2
5–7 Aug 2024	Euromedia	–	50.9 (Note: Giacomo Raul Giampedrone)	49.1	–	1.8

=== Parties ===
Date	Polling firm	Sample size	Centre-right							Centre-left								UpC	Others	Lead
Date	Polling firm	Sample size	FdI	FI	Lega	VL	NM	LP	Oth.	PD	M5S	AOP	AVS	IV	PCR	+E	LaTA	UpC	Others	Lead
24 Sep–3 Oct 2024	BiDiMedia	1,000	20.2	5.7	8.0	10.4		2.2	1.0	25.9	7.0	4.0	7.1	—N/a	2.2	—N/a	1.0	1.8	3.5	5.7
Sep 2024	Tecnè	–	25.0	9.0	6.0	—N/a	4.0	—N/a	1.0	27.0	8.0	8.0	5.0	2.0	2.0	1.0	—N/a	1.0	1.0	2.0

== Results ==
27–28 October 2024 Ligurian regional election results
Candidates	Votes	%	Seats	Parties	Votes	%	Seats
Marco Bucci	291,093	48.77	1	Brothers of Italy	84,816	15.08	5
Marco Bucci	291,093	48.77	1	Bucci for President Liguria Wins	53,208	9.46	3
Marco Bucci	291,093	48.77	1	League	47,652	8.47	3
Marco Bucci	291,093	48.77	1	Forza Italia	44,849	7.98	3
Marco Bucci	291,093	48.77	1	Ligurian Pride	32,061	5.70	3
Marco Bucci	291,093	48.77	1	Union of the Centre	7,294	1.30	–
Marco Bucci	291,093	48.77	1	Popular Alternative	1,929	0.34	–
Marco Bucci	291,093	48.77	1	Total	271,809	48.34	17
Andrea Orlando	282,669	47.36	1	Democratic Party	160,063	28.47	8
Andrea Orlando	282,669	47.36	1	Greens and Left Alliance	34,716	6.17	2
Andrea Orlando	282,669	47.36	1	Andrea Orlando List	29,808	5.30	1
Andrea Orlando	282,669	47.36	1	Five Star Movement	25,659	4.56	1
Andrea Orlando	282,669	47.36	1	Civic Reformist Pact	9,813	1.75	–
Andrea Orlando	282,669	47.36	1	Head-on Ligurians	9,127	1.62	–
Andrea Orlando	282,669	47.36	1	Total	269,186	47.87	12
Nicola Morra	5,223	0.88	–	United for the Constitution	4,922	0.88	–
Nicola Rollando	5,079	0.85	–	For the Alternative	4,920	0.87	–
Francesco Toscano	5,071	0.85	–	Sovereign Popular Democracy	4,709	0.84	–
Marco Ferrando	2,099	0.35	–	Workers' Communist Party	1,813	0.32	–
Maria Antonietta Cella	2,076	0.35	–	Northern People’s Party	1,674	0.30	–
Davide Felice	1,855	0.31	–	Force of the People	1,696	0.30	–
Alessandro Rosson	1,668	0.28	–	Independence!	1,570	0.28	–
Total candidates	596,833	100.00	2	Total parties	562,299	100.00	29
Blank and invalid votes	15,915	2.58					
Registered voters/turnout	1,341,693	45.97					
Source: Ministry of the Interior – Election in Liguria

Popular vote
PD	28.47%
FdI	15.08%
Bucci	9.46%
Lega	8.47%
FI	7.98%
AVS	6.17%
OL	5.70%
Orlando	5.30%
M5S	4.56%
PCR	1.75%
LaTA	1.62%
UDC	1.30%
Others	4.14%

President
Bucci	48.77%
Orlando	47.36%
Others	3.87%

=== Results by province and capital city ===
Whilst the province of Imperia voted for Bucci by 24 points, in all the other provinces the end result came within five points: Bucci won the province of Savona by 3 points, whilst Orlando won by 2 points in the metropolitan City of Genoa and by 4 points in the province of La Spezia.

In the major cities, despite being the incumbent mayor of Genoa, Bucci lost in his hometown to Orlando by 8 points but won Sanremo by 25.5 points and Imperia by 9 points; whilst Savona voted for Orlando by 20 points and La Spezia by 5 points. Overall, Orlando's strongest areas were the three largest cities of the region (Genoa, La Spezia, Savona) and their surrounding municipalities, whilst Bucci was the strongest west of Savona and in the Tigullio area east of Genova. Orlando's strength in Savona can be attributed to opposition to a regasification plant in nearby Vado Ligure that former president Toti had proposed to build in a protected sea area.

Province	Andrea Orlando	Marco Bucci	Others
Genoa	168,556 49.13%	161,463 47.06%	13,086 3.61%
La Spezia	42,918 50.31%	39,360 46.14%	3,023 3.55%
Savona	47,564 46.38%	50,678 49.41%	4,315 4.21%
Imperia	23,633 35.88%	39,588 60.10%	2,648 4.02%

City	Andrea Orlando	Marco Bucci	Others
Genoa	121,821 52.27%	103,219 44.29%	8,007 3.44%
La Spezia	17,610 51.11%	15,770 45.77%	1,073 3.12%
Savona	12,932 57.96%	8,373 37.53%	1,006 4.51%
Imperia	6,279 43.29%	7,623 52.55%	604 4.16%

== See also ==
- 2024 Italian regional elections
