= 2010 Italian regional elections =

Ballots for 13 of the 20 regional assemblies of Italy

- 28–29 March 2010

Presidents and regional assemblies of Piedmont, Lombardy, Veneto, Liguria, Emilia-Romagna, Tuscany, Marche, Umbria, Lazio, Campania, Apulia, Basilicata and Calabria
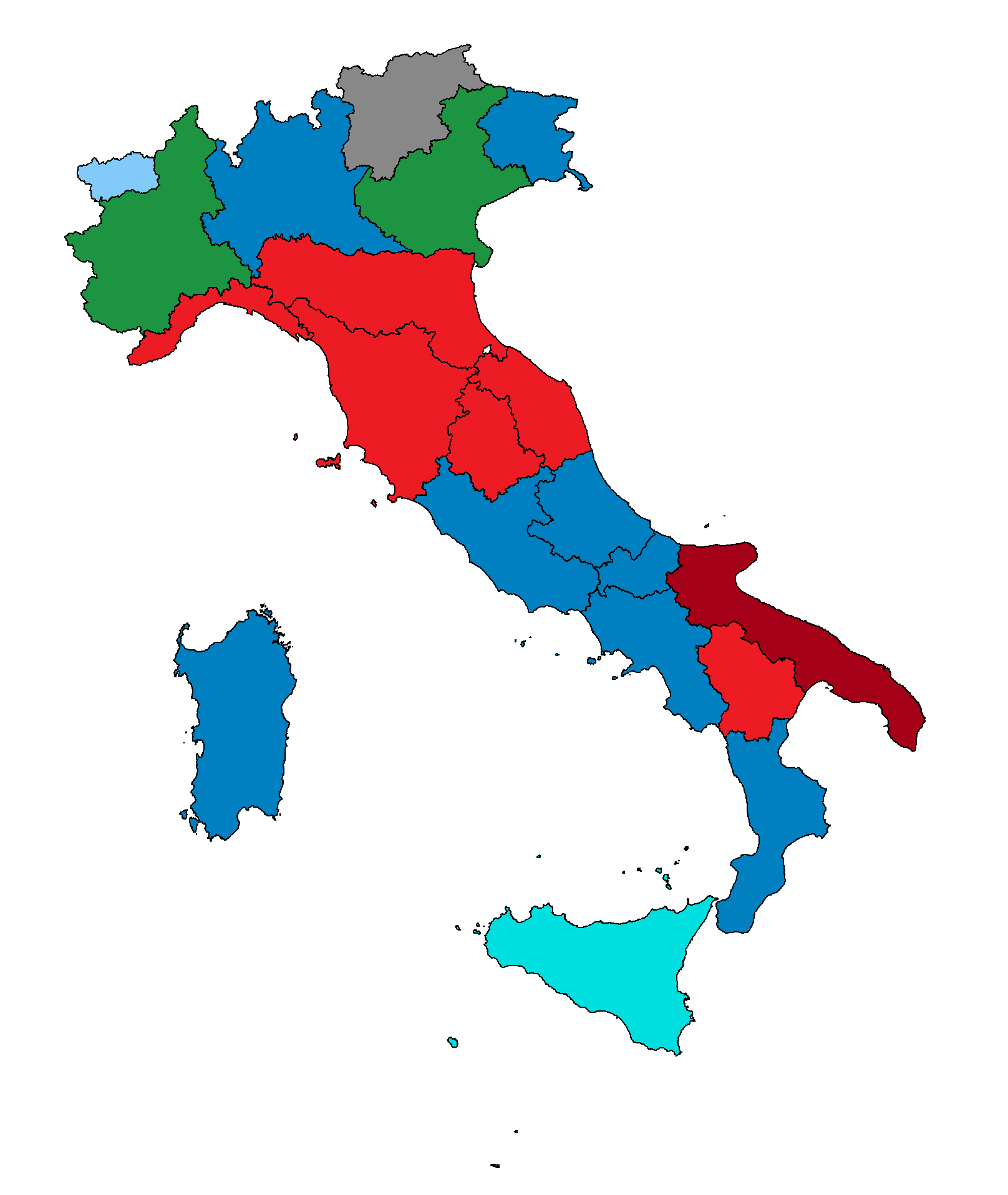
- Elected Presidents: Democratic Party The People of Freedom Northern League Left Ecology Freedom Movement for the Autonomies

The Italian regional elections of 2010 took place on 28–29 March in 13 regions, including nine of the ten largest ones: Lombardy, Campania, Veneto, Lazio, Piedmont, Emilia-Romagna, Apulia, Tuscany and Calabria.

== Overview ==
The elections turned out to be a competition between two rival coalitions centered around the two major parties: The People of Freedom (PdL), led by Silvio Berlusconi, and the Democratic Party (PD), led by Pier Luigi Bersani. The third-largest party in Italy, the Northern League (whose main regional sections — Liga Veneta, Lega Lombarda, and Lega Piemont — played major roles in Veneto, Lombardy, and Piedmont, respectively), supported joint candidates with the PdL in Northern and Central Italy.

The centre-right coalition went on to win the elections, gaining four additional regions, although the centre-left coalition maintained control of seven out of thirteen regions.

Beppe Grillo’s Five Star Movement (M5S) also had a strong showing in Emilia-Romagna.

== Overall results ==
=== Regional councils ===
Alliance	Votes	%	Seats
Centre-right coalition	12,190,360	49.04	344 / 698
Centre-left coalition	10,887,409	43.80	329 / 698
Others	1,780,526	7.16	25 / 698
Total	24,858,295	100	698 / 698
Source: Ministry of the Interior

Party	Votes	%	Seats
The People of Freedom (PdL)	6,003,106	26.7	176 / 698
Democratic Party (PD)	5,851,371	26.1	192 / 698
Northern League (LN)	2,749,875	12.2	58 / 698
Italy of Values (IdV)	1,565,336	7.0	46 / 698
Union of the Centre (UDC)	1,248,886	5.6	36 / 698
Left Ecology Freedom (SEL)	478,187	2.1	18 / 698
Others	3,903,908	17.4	172 / 698
Total	21,800,669	100	698 / 698
Source: Ministry of the Interior

=== Presidents of the regions ===
Region	Outgoing			Elected			Election
Region	President	Party	Alliance	President	Party	Alliance	Election
Piedmont	Mercedes Bresso	PD	Centre-left	Roberto Cota	LN	Centre-right	Details
Liguria	Claudio Burlando	PD	Centre-left	Claudio Burlando	PD	Centre-left	Details
Lombardy	Roberto Formigoni	PdL	Centre-right	Roberto Formigoni	PdL	Centre-right	Details
Veneto	Giancarlo Galan	PdL	Centre-right	Luca Zaia	LN	Centre-right	Details
Emilia-Romagna	Vasco Errani	PD	Centre-left	Vasco Errani	PD	Centre-left	Details
Tuscany	Claudio Martini	PD	Centre-left	Enrico Rossi	PD	Centre-left	Details
Umbria	Maria Rita Lorenzetti	PD	Centre-left	Catiuscia Marini	PD	Centre-left	Details
Marche	Gian Mario Spacca	PD	Centre-left	Gian Mario Spacca	PD	Centre-left	Details
Lazio	Esterino Montino (acting)	PD	Centre-left	Renata Polverini	PdL	Centre-right	Details
Campania	Antonio Bassolino	PD	Centre-left	Stefano Caldoro	PdL	Centre-right	Details
Basilicata	Vito De Filippo	PD	Centre-left	Vito De Filippo	PD	Centre-left	Details
Apulia	Nichi Vendola	SEL	Centre-left	Nichi Vendola	SEL	Centre-left	Details
Calabria	Agazio Loiero	PD	Centre-left	Giuseppe Scopelliti	PdL	Centre-right	Details

== Summary by region ==
=== Piedmont ===
President				Regional council			
Candidate	Party	Votes	%	Alliance	Votes	%	Seats
Roberto Cota	LN	1,043,318	47.3	Centre-right	889,916	47.0	36
Mercedes Bresso	PD	1,033,946	46.9	Centre-left	900,537	47.6	22
Davide Bono	M5S	90,086	4.1	M5S	69,448	3.7	2
Others		36,999	1.7	Others	34,170	1.8	0
Voters: 2,338,487 — Turnout: 64.3%

=== Lombardy ===
President				Regional council			
Candidate	Party	Votes	%	Alliance	Votes	%	Seats
Roberto Formigoni	PdL	2,704,364	56.1	Centre-right	2,479,368	58.2	49
Filippo Penati	PD	1,603,666	33.3	Centre-left	1,421,688	33.3	28
Savino Pezzotta	UDC	225,849	4.7	UDC	164,078	3.9	3
Others		285,697	5.9	Others	197,892	4.6	0
Voters: 4,973,519 — Turnout: 64.6%

=== Veneto ===
President				Regional council			
Candidate	Party	Votes	%	Alliance	Votes	%	Seats
Luca Zaia	LN	1,528,386	60.2	Centre-right	1,361,702	60.7	37
Giuseppe Bortolussi	Ind	738,761	29.1	Centre-left	657,798	29.3	19
Antonio De Poli	UDC	162,235	6.4	UDC	145,114	6.5	4
Others		111,294	4.4	Others	78,429	3.5	0
Voters: 2,631,570 — Turnout: 66.4%

=== Liguria ===
President				Regional council			
Candidate	Party	Votes	%	Alliance	Votes	%	Seats
Claudio Burlando	PD	424,044	52.1	Centre-left	393,383	52.7	25
Sandro Biasotti	PdL	389,132	47.9	Centre-right	352,652	47.3	15
Voters: 844,249 — Turnout: 60.9%

=== Emilia-Romagna ===
President				Regional council			
Candidate	Party	Votes	%	Alliance	Votes	%	Seats
Vasco Errani	PD	1,197,789	52.1	Centre-left	1,095,604	51.9	32
Anna Maria Bernini	PdL	844,915	36.7	Centre-right	808,404	38.3	15
Giovanni Favia	M5S	161,056	7.0	M5S	126,619	6.0	2
Gian Luca Galletti	UDC	96,625	4.2	UDC	79,244	3.8	1
Voters: 2,357,733 — Turnout: 68.1%

=== Tuscany ===
President				Regional council			
Candidate	Party	Votes	%	Alliance	Votes	%	Seats
Enrico Rossi	PD	1,055,751	59.7	Centre-left	922,240	60.7	32
Monica Faenzi	PdL	608,680	34.4	Centre-right	510,641	33.7	19
Francesco Bosi	UDC	81,106	4.6	UDC	72,548	4.8	2
Others		21,872	1.2	Others	14,002	0.9	0
Voters: 1,827,266 — Turnout: 60.7%

=== Umbria ===
President				Regional council			
Candidate	Party	Votes	%	Alliance	Votes	%	Seats
Catiuscia Marini	PD	257,458	57.2	Centre-left	243.090	58.9	20
Fiammetta Modena	PdL	169,568	37.7	Centre-right	151,418	36.7	10
Paola Binetti	UDC	22,756	5.1	UDC	18,072	4.4	1
Voters: 466,670 — Turnout: 65.4%

=== Marche ===
President				Regional council			
Candidate	Party	Votes	%	Alliance	Votes	%	Seats
Gian Mario Spacca	PD	409,823	53.2	Centre-left	385,592	53.4	25
Erminio Marinelli	PdL	306,075	39.7	Centre-right	289,931	40.1	16
Massimo Rossi	PRC	54,851	7.1	PRC	47,083	6.5	2
Voters: 809,146 — Turnout: 62.3%

=== Lazio ===
President				Regional council			
Candidate	Party	Votes	%	Alliance	Votes	%	Seats
Renata Polverini	PdL	1,409,025	51.1	Centre-right	1,260,094	51.4	42
Emma Bonino	RI	1,331,375	48.3	Centre-left	1,185,232	48.3	29
Others		14,685	0.5	Others	7,860	0.3	0
Voters: 2,875,469 — Turnout: 60.9%

=== Campania ===
President				Regional council			
Candidate	Party	Votes	%	Alliance	Votes	%	Seats
Stefano Caldoro	PdL	1,586,490	54.3	Centre-right	1,615,118	58.6	39
Vincenzo De Luca	PD	1,258,787	43.0	Centre-left	1,061,148	38.5	21
Others		79,083	1.7	Others	79,889	2.9	0
Voters: 3,114,075 — Turnout: 63.0%

=== Basilicata ===
President				Regional council			
Candidate	Party	Votes	%	Alliance	Votes	%	Seats
Vito De Filippo	PD	202,980	60.8	Centre-left	216,945	67.6	19
Nicola Pagliuca	PdL	93,204	27.9	Centre-right	87,493	27.2	9
Magdi Allam	ALI	29,107	8.7	ALI	13,700	4.3	1
Others		8,448	2.5	Others	2,960	0.9	0
Voters: 357,607 — Turnout: 62.8%

=== Apulia ===
President				Regional council			
Candidate	Party	Votes	%	Alliance	Votes	%	Seats
Nichi Vendola	SEL	1,036,638	48.7	Centre-left	910,692	46.1	39
Rocco Palese	PdL	899,590	42.3	Centre-right	874,462	44.2	27
Adriana Poli Bortone	IS	185,370	8.7	NPI	186,443	9.4	4
Others		7,376	0.3	Others	5,834	0.3	0
Voters: 2,245,412 — Turnout: 63.2%

=== Calabria ===
President				Regional council			
Candidate	Party	Votes	%	Alliance	Votes	%	Seats
Giuseppe Scopelliti	PdL	614,584	57.8	Centre-right	592,523	57.6	30
Agazio Loiero	PD	342,773	32.2	Centre-left	358,378	34.8	17
Filippo Callipo	IRC	106,646	10.0	IdV–IRC	78,364	7.6	3
Voters: 1,118,429 — Turnout: 59.3%

Sources: Ministry of the Interior – Historical Archive of Elections, Corriere della Sera and La Repubblica
