= Castellaneta (surname) =

Castellaneta is a surname. Notable people with the surname include:

- Carlo Castellaneta (1930–2013), Italian author and journalist
- Dan Castellaneta (born 1957), American actor, comedian, producer and screenwriter
- P. J. Castellaneta (born 1960), American film director
- Sergio Castellaneta (1932–2018), Italian politician
