= SS Robert Trimble =

World War II Liberty ship of the United States

History

United States
- Name: Robert Trimble
- Namesake: Robert Trimble
- Owner: War Shipping Administration (WSA)
- Operator: Agwilines, Inc.
- Ordered: as type (EC2-S-C1) hull, MC hull 1493
- Builder: J.A. Jones Construction, Brunswick, Georgia
- Cost: $2,173,763
- Yard number: 109
- Way number: 5
- Laid down: 29 August 1942
- Launched: 21 June 1943
- Completed: 20 July 1943
- Identification: Call Signal: KIQS
- Fate: Sold to Italy, 1947

Italy
- Name: Andrea
- Namesake: Andrea Corrado
- Owner: Societe Di Navigazione Corrado
- Acquired: 27 December 1963
- Fate: Scrapped, 1963

General characteristics
- Class & type: Liberty ship; type EC2-S-C1, standard
- Tonnage: 10,865 LT DWT; 7,176 GRT
- Displacement: 3,380 long tons (3,434 t) (light); 14,245 long tons (14,474 t) (max)
- Length: 441 feet 6 inches (135 m) oa; 416 feet (127 m) pp; 427 feet (130 m) lwl
- Beam: 57 feet (17 m)
- Draft: 27 ft 9.25 in (8.4646 m)
- Installed power: 2 × Oil fired 450 °F (232 °C) boilers, operating at 220 psi (1,500 kPa); 2,500 hp (1,900 kW)
- Propulsion: 1 × triple-expansion steam engine, (manufactured by General Machinery Corp., Hamilton, Ohio); 1 × screw propeller
- Speed: 11.5 knots (21.3 km/h; 13.2 mph)
- Capacity: 562,608 cubic feet (15,931 m^{3}) (grain); 499,573 cubic feet (14,146 m^{3}) (bale)
- Complement: 38–62 USMM; 21–40 USNAG
- Armament: Varied by ship; Bow-mounted 3-inch (76 mm)/50-caliber gun; Stern-mounted 4-inch (102 mm)/50-caliber gun; 2–8 × single 20-millimeter (0.79 in) Oerlikon anti-aircraft (AA) cannons and/or, 2–8 × 37-millimeter (1.46 in) M1 AA guns

SS Robert Trimble was a Liberty ship built in the United States during World War II. She was named after Robert Trimble, an Associate Justice of the Supreme Court of the United States.

== Construction ==
Robert Trimble was laid down on 29 August 1942, under a United States Maritime Commission (MARCOM) contract, MC hull 1493, by J.A. Jones Construction, Brunswick, Georgia, and launched on 21 June 1943.

== History ==
She was allocated to Agwilines, Inc., on 20 July 1943. On 23 December 1946, she was transferred to the Italian Government, which in turn sold her to Socite Di Navigazione Corrado for $544,506, on 27 December 1946. She was renamed Andrea and scrapped in June 1963.

== Bibliography ==
- "Jones Construction, Brunswick GA". ShipbuildingHistory.com. 13 October 2010.
- "Liberty Ships – World War II".
- Maritime Administration. "Robert Trimble". Ship History Database Vessel Status Card. U.S. Department of Transportation, Maritime Administration. Archived from the original on 12 December 2019.
- Davies, James (May 2004). "Specifications (As-Built)" (PDF). p. 23.
- "SS Robert Trimble".
