= 2010 Ligurian regional election =

- 28–29 March 2010
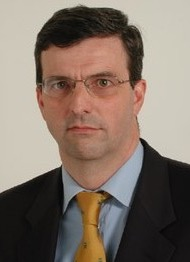

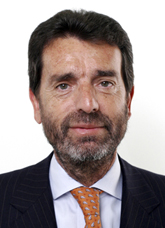
	Majority party	Minority party
Leader	Claudio Burlando	Sandro Biasotti
Party	Democratic Party	People of Freedom
Alliance	Centre-left	Centre-right
Seats won	25	15
Seat change	▼1	▲1
Popular vote	424,044	389,132
Percentage	52.15%	47.85%
Swing	▼0.49%	▲1.27%
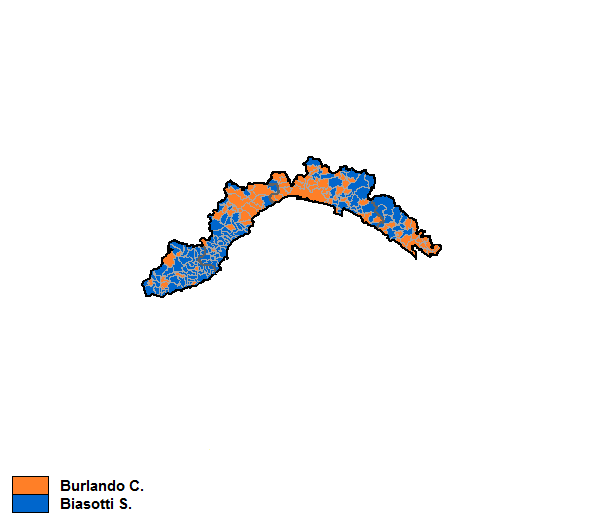
President before election
Claudio Burlando
PD
Subsequent President
Claudio Burlando
PD

The Ligurian regional election of 2010 took place on 28–29 March 2010.

The incumbent President Claudio Burlando of the centre-left Democratic Party (PD) faced Sandro Biasotti, backed by The People of Freedom (PdL) and Northern League Liguria. Biasotti was President of the Region from 2000 to 2005, when he was defeated by Burlando. The Union of the Centre (UdC), a traditionally centre-right political force, supported the centre-left candidate Burlando.

Burlando secured a second consecutive term, but the PdL came out as the largest party in the region.

== Electoral system ==
Regional elections in Liguria were ruled by the "Tatarella law" (approved in 1995), which provided for a mixed electoral system: four fifths of the regional councilors were elected in provincial constituencies by proportional representation, using the largest remainder method with a droop quota and open lists, while the residual votes and the unassigned seats were grouped into a "single regional constituency", where the whole ratios and the highest remainders were divided with the Hare method among the provincial party lists; one fifth of the council seats instead was reserved for regional lists and assigned with a majoritarian system: the leader of the regional list that scored the highest number of votes was elected to the presidency of the Region while the other candidates were elected regional councilors.

A threshold of 3% had been established for the provincial lists, which, however, could still have entered the regional council if the regional list to which they were connected had scored at least 5% of valid votes.

The panachage was also allowed: the voter can indicate a candidate for the presidency but prefer a provincial list connected to another candidate.

== Parties and candidates ==
Political party or alliance	Constituent lists	Previous result		Candidate
Political party or alliance	Constituent lists	Votes (%)	Seats	Candidate
Centre-left coalition	Democratic Party	34.4	12	Claudio Burlando
Centre-left coalition	Federation of the Left	9.3	3	Claudio Burlando
Centre-left coalition	Union of the Centre	3.3	1	Claudio Burlando
Centre-left coalition	Federation of the Greens	2.0	1	Claudio Burlando
Centre-left coalition	Italy of Values	1.3	1	Claudio Burlando
Centre-left coalition	Pensioners' Party	0.9	–	Claudio Burlando
Centre-left coalition	Burlando List	—N/a	—N/a	Claudio Burlando
Centre-left coalition	Bertone List	—N/a	—N/a	Claudio Burlando
Centre-left coalition	Left Ecology Freedom	—N/a	—N/a	Claudio Burlando
Centre-right coalition	The People of Freedom	26.8	8	Sandro Biasotti
Centre-right coalition	Biasotti List	8.7	3	Sandro Biasotti
Centre-right coalition	Northern League Liguria	4.7	1	Sandro Biasotti
Centre-right coalition	People of Italy	4.4	1	Sandro Biasotti
Centre-right coalition	Pensioners' Party	0.9	–	Sandro Biasotti
Centre-right coalition	New Italian Socialist Party	0.7	–	Sandro Biasotti
Centre-right coalition	The Right	—N/a	—N/a	Sandro Biasotti

== Results ==
28–29 March 2010 Ligurian regional election results
Candidates	Votes	%	Seats	Parties	Votes	%	Seats
Claudio Burlando	424,044	52.15	8	Democratic Party	211,500	28.35	10
Claudio Burlando	424,044	52.15	8	Italy of Values	63,028	8.45	3
Claudio Burlando	424,044	52.15	8	Union of the Centre	29,335	3.93	1
Claudio Burlando	424,044	52.15	8	Federation of the Left	29,148	3.91	1
Claudio Burlando	424,044	52.15	8	Us with Burlando	27,607	3.70	1
Claudio Burlando	424,044	52.15	8	Left Ecology Freedom	18,418	2.47	1
Claudio Burlando	424,044	52.15	8	Federation of the Greens	8,624	1.16	1
Claudio Burlando	424,044	52.15	8	Bertone List – Democratic Alliance	5,723	0.77	–
Claudio Burlando	424,044	52.15	8	Total	393,383	52.73	17
Sandro Biasotti	389,132	47.85	1	The People of Freedom	218,398	31.10	10
Sandro Biasotti	389,132	47.85	1	Northern League Liguria	76,265	10.22	3
Sandro Biasotti	389,132	47.85	1	Civic Lists for Biasotti for President	45,261	6.07	1
Sandro Biasotti	389,132	47.85	1	People of Italy	5,398	0.72	–
Sandro Biasotti	389,132	47.85	1	The Right	2,688	0.36	–
Sandro Biasotti	389,132	47.85	1	Pensioners' Party	2,566	0.34	–
Sandro Biasotti	389,132	47.85	1	New Italian Socialist Party	2,076	0.28	–
Sandro Biasotti	389,132	47.85	1	Total	352,652	47.27	14
Total candidates	813,176	100.00	9	Total parties	746,035	100.00	31
Source: Ministry of the Interior

Popular vote
PdL	31.10%
PD	28.35%
Lega	10.22%
IdV	8.59%
Biasotti	6.07%
UdC	3.93%
FdS	3.91%
Burlando	3.70%
SEL	2.47%
FdV	1.16%
Others	2.47%

President
Burlando	52.15%
Biasotti	47.85%

Seats summary
Centre-left	80.65%
Centre-right	19.35%
