= 2015 Ligurian regional election =

- 31 May 2015
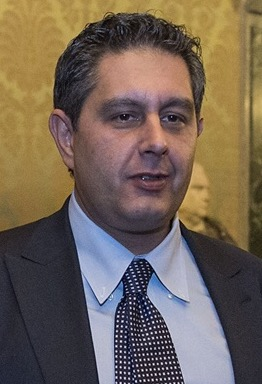

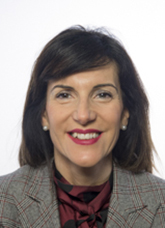

	Majority party	Minority party	Third party
Leader	Giovanni Toti	Raffaella Paita	Alice Salvatore
Party	Forza Italia	Democratic Party	Five Star Movement
Alliance	Centre-right	Centre-left
Seats won	16	8	6
Seat change	▲1	▼17	new
Popular vote	226,710	183,272	163,527
Percentage	34.4%	27.8%	24.8%
Swing	▼23.5%	▼24.4%	new
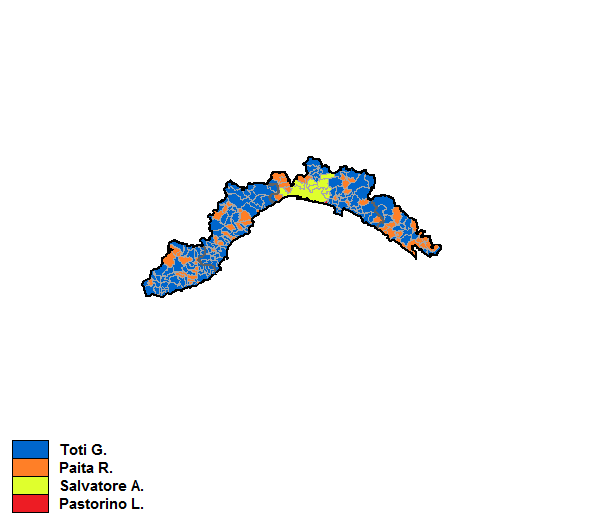
President before election
Claudio Burlando
PD
Subsequent President
Giovanni Toti
FI

The Ligurian regional election of 2015 took place on 31 May 2015.

Giovanni Toti of Forza Italia, who benefited of the decisive support of the Northern League Liguria, was elected President in a three-way race with Raffaella Paita of the Democratic Party, which was the largest party, and Alice Salvatore of the Five Star Movement.

== Electoral system ==
The Regional Council of Liguria is composed of 30 members, plus the president elect. The president elect is the candidate winning a plurality of votes at the election. Within the council, 24 seats are elected in provincial constituencies by proportional representation. The remaining 6 councillors are assigned as a majority bonus if the winning candidate has less than 18 seats, otherwise they are distributed among the losing coalitions.

A single list must get at least 3% of the votes in a province in order to access the proportional distribution of seats, unless the list is connected to a coalition with more than 5% of the vote.

== Parties and candidates ==
Political party or alliance	Constituent lists	Previous result		Candidate
Political party or alliance	Constituent lists	Votes (%)	Seats	Candidate
Centre-left coalition	Democratic Party	28.3	10	Raffaella Paita
Centre-left coalition	Civic lists	—N/a	—N/a	Raffaella Paita
Centre-right coalition	Forza Italia	31.1	10	Giovanni Toti
Centre-right coalition	Northern League Liguria	10.2	3	Giovanni Toti
Centre-right coalition	Brothers of Italy	—N/a	—N/a	Giovanni Toti
Centre-right coalition	Popular Area (incl. NCD, UDC)	—N/a	—N/a	Giovanni Toti
Network to the Left (incl. SEL, PRC, PCdI)		6.4	2	Luca Pastorino
Five Star Movement		1.0	–	Alice Salvatore

== Results ==
31 May 2015 Ligurian regional election results
Candidates	Votes	%	Seats	Parties	Votes	%	Seats
Giovanni Toti	226,710	34.45	7	Northern League Liguria	109,209	20.25	5
Giovanni Toti	226,710	34.45	7	Forza Italia	68,286	12.66	3
Giovanni Toti	226,710	34.45	7	Brothers of Italy	16,562	3.07	1
Giovanni Toti	226,710	34.45	7	Popular Area	9,269	1.72	–
Giovanni Toti	226,710	34.45	7	Total	203,326	37.71	9
Raffaella Paita	183,272	27.85	1	Democratic Party	138,257	25.64	7
Raffaella Paita	183,272	27.85	1	Ligurians for Paita	17,060	3.16	–
Raffaella Paita	183,272	27.85	1	Change Liguria	8,330	1.54	–
Raffaella Paita	183,272	27.85	1	Total	163,647	30.35	7
Alice Salvatore	163,527	24.85	–	Five Star Movement	120,219	22.29	6
Luca Pastorino	61,988	9.42	–	Network to the Left (incl. SEL, PRC, PCd’I)	22,093	4.10	1
Luca Pastorino	61,988	9.42	–	Pastorino List	13,500	2.50	–
Luca Pastorino	61,988	9.42	–	Total	35,593	6.60	1
Enrico Musso	10,667	1.62	–	Free Liguria	8,408	1.56	–
Matteo Piccardi	5,136	0.78	–	Workers' Communist Party	3,036	0.56	–
Antonio Bruno	4,855	0.74	–	Other Liguria Project	3,937	0.73	–
Mirella Batini	2,016	0.31	–	Women Brotherhood	1,084	0.20	–
Total candidates	658,171	100.00	8	Total parties	539,250	100.00	23
Source: Ministry of the Interior – Results

== See also ==
- 2015 Italian regional elections
