= Francesco Bruzzone =

Italian politician (born 1962)

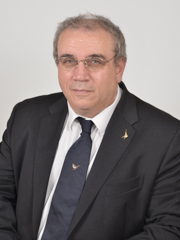
- Bruzzone in 2018

Member of the Chamber of Deputies
- Incumbent
- Assumed office 13 October 2022
- Constituency: Liguria – 01

Member of the Senate
- In office 23 March 2018 – 12 October 2022
- Constituency: Liguria – 01

President of the Regional Council of Liguria
- In office August 2002 – May 2005
- Preceded by: Vincenzo Gianni Plinio
- Succeeded by: Giacomo Ronzitti
- In office 1 July 2015 – 30 March 2018
- Preceded by: Michele Boffa
- Succeeded by: Alessandro Piana

Personal details
- Born: 23 May 1962 (age 64) Genoa, Italy
- Party: Lega

Francesco Bruzzone (born 23 May 1962) is an Italian politician serving as a member of the Chamber of Deputies since 2022. From 2018 to 2022, he was a member of the Senate. He served as president of the Regional Council of Liguria from 2002 to 2005 and from 2015 to 2018.

== Life and career ==
Born in Genoa, Bruzzone lives in Stella, in the Province of Savona.

After graduating from high school with a science degree, he worked at Ilva and the City of Genoa, before turning his attention to politics and party activities.
