= Raffaella Paita =

Italian politician (born 1974)

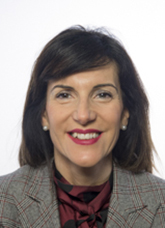
- Paita in 2018

Member of the Senate
- Incumbent
- Assumed office 13 October 2022
- Constituency: Lazio – P01

Member of the Chamber of Deputies
- In office 23 March 2018 – 12 October 2022
- Constituency: Liguria – P02

Personal details
- Born: 23 November 1974 (age 51) La Spezia, Italy
- Party: Italia Viva (since 2019)

Raffaella Paita (born 23 November 1974) is an Italian politician serving as a member of the Senate since 2022. From 2018 to 2022, she was a member of the Chamber of Deputies.

== Biography ==
A freelance journalist, at the age of 14 she joined the Italian Communist Youth Federation, the youth organization of the Italian Communist Party (PCI), which—following Achille Occhetto's "Bolognina" shift from the PCI to the Democratic Party of the Left (PDS)—joined the Youth Left (Italy), where she served as provincial and regional secretary.

In the 1997 local elections, she ran for the La Spezia City Council on the PDS ticket in support of the center-left mayoral candidate Giorgio Pagano. She was elected to the city council and went on to serve as the PDS caucus Parliamentary leader in the city council.

From 2002 to 2007, she served as chief of staff to La Spezia Mayor Pagano, and from 2007 to 2010, she was a council member on the La Spezia city council led by Massimo Federici.

In the 2010 regional elections in Liguria, she ran as a candidate for the Democratic Party (Italy)(PD), on the slate of outgoing president Claudio Burlando, and was elected in the La Spezia district with 9,248 votes to the Liguria Regional Council, where she briefly served as the PD's floor leader, and subsequently became councilor for infrastructure and civil protection in the Liguria regional government headed by Burlando, to whom she was often very close. In that role, she launched the construction projects for the Tortona–Genoa high-speed railway.
