= 2020 Ligurian regional election =

Election in Italy

- 20–21 September 2020

All 31 seats to the Regional Council of Liguria
- Turnout: 53.5% (▲2.8%)
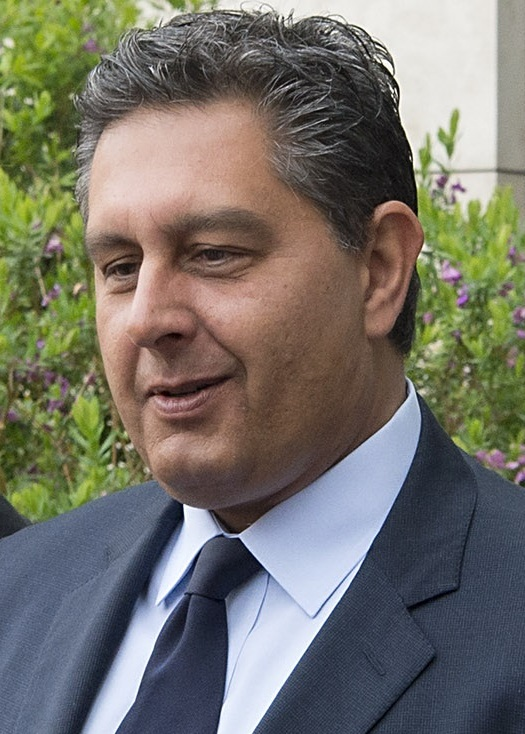

	Majority party	Minority party
Leader	Giovanni Toti	Ferruccio Sansa
Party	Cambiamo!	Independent
Alliance	Centre-right	Centre-left–M5S
Seats won	19	12
Seat change	▲3	▼2
Popular vote	383,053	265,506
Percentage	56.1%	38.9%
Swing	▲21.7%	▼13.7%
President before election
Giovanni Toti
Cambiamo!
Elected President
Giovanni Toti
Cambiamo!

The 2020 Ligurian regional election took place in Liguria, Italy on 20–21 September 2020. It was originally scheduled to take place on 31 May 2020, but it was delayed due to the COVID-19 pandemic in Italy.

The result of the election was an absolute win of the incumbent President of Liguria, Giovanni Toti.

== Electoral system ==
The Regional Council of Liguria is composed of 30 members, plus the president elect. The president elect is the candidate winning a plurality of votes at the election. Within the council, 24 seats are elected in provincial constituencies by proportional representation. The remaining 6 councillors are assigned as a majority bonus if the winning candidate has less than 18 seats, otherwise they are distributed among the losing coalitions.

A single list must get at least 3% of the votes in a province in order to access the proportional distribution of seats, unless the list is connected to a coalition with more than 5% of the vote.

== Parties and candidates ==
Political party or alliance	Constituent lists	Previous result		Candidate
Political party or alliance	Constituent lists	Votes (%)	Seats	Candidate
Centre-right coalition	League (Lega)	20.3	5	Giovanni Toti
Centre-right coalition	Forza Italia – Popular Liguria (FI–LP) (incl. NPSI)	12.7	3	Giovanni Toti
Centre-right coalition	Brothers of Italy (FdI)	3.1	1	Giovanni Toti
Centre-right coalition	Let's Change with Toti for President	—N/a	—N/a	Giovanni Toti
Centre-right coalition	Union of the Centre (UDC)	1.7	—N/a	Giovanni Toti
Centre-left – M5S	Democratic Party – Article One (PD–Art.1)	25.6	7	Ferruccio Sansa
Centre-left – M5S	Five Star Movement (M5S)	22.3	6	Ferruccio Sansa
Centre-left – M5S	Shared Line (incl. SI, Pos, èViva)	—N/a	—N/a	Ferruccio Sansa
Centre-left – M5S	Ferruccio Sansa for President (incl. The Network 2018)	—N/a	—N/a	Ferruccio Sansa
Centre-left – M5S	Green Europe – Solidary Democracy – Democratic Centre (EV–DemoS–CD)	—N/a	—N/a	Ferruccio Sansa
Massardo for President (PSI – +E – IV)		—N/a	—N/a	Aristide Massardo
The Common Sense (SC)		—N/a	—N/a	Alice Salvatore
Constitutional Base (BC)		—N/a	—N/a	Marika Cassimatis
Great Liguria (GL)		—N/a	—N/a	Giacomo Chiappori
Reconquer Italy (RI)		—N/a	—N/a	Davide Visigalli
The People of the Family (PdF) (incl. DC)		—N/a	—N/a	Gaetano Russo
Now – Respect for all Animals		—N/a	—N/a	Riccardo Benetti
Carlo Carpi List (LCC)		—N/a	—N/a	Carlo Carpi

== Opinion polls ==
=== Candidates ===
Date	Polling firm/ Client	Sample size	Toti	Sansa	Massardo	Others	Undecided	Lead
28 Aug–1 Sep 2020	Ipsos	750	57.4	34.8	2.5	5.3	12.8	22.6
24 Aug–2 Sep 2020	Noto	—N/a	54–58	37–41	—N/a	3–7	—N/a	13–21
24–25 Aug 2020	Scenari Politici–Winpoll	1,000	60.1	34.4	4.3	1.2	—N/a	25.7
24 Aug 2020	Tecnè	2,000	53–57	36–40	3–5	3–5	—N/a	13–21
3–6 Aug 2020	SWG (Note: This poll was commissioned by a political party.)	1,000	52.0	41.0	4.5	2.0	—N/a	11.0
3–4 Aug 2020	Tecnè	1,000	53.0	41.0	4.0	2.0	16.3	12.0
26 Jun 2020	Noto	–	49.0	42.0	4.0	5.0	—N/a	7.0
13–18 Feb 2020	SWG	1,000	58.0	35.0	—N/a	7.0	22.0	23.0

=== Parties ===
Date	Polling firm	Sample size	Centre-right					Centre-left – M5S				Massardo	Others	Undecided	Lead
Date	Polling firm	Sample size	C!	Lega	FI	FdI	Other	PD	M5S	LS	Other	Massardo	Others	Undecided	Lead
28 Aug–1 Sep 2020	Ipsos	1,000	19.8	21.1	6.3	9.4	0.5	16.0	9.7	3.5	7.4	2.5	6.3	14.7	1.3
25–26 Aug 2020	Scenari Politici–Winpoll	1,000	10.6	25.7	6.9	12.5	1.3	17.1	11.2	2.7	6.2	4.8	0.7	—N/a	8.6
3–6 Aug 2020	SWG	1,500	17.7	21.0	5.0	7.0	1.5	21.5	10.5	3.5	5.5	4.5	2.5	—N/a	0.5
11–23 Mar 2020	SWG	1,500	20.5	22.5	4.0	7.0	2.0	20.0	8.0	3.5	3.5	2.5	6.5	—N/a	2.0
12 Mar 2020	Piepoli	–	8.0	28.0	6.0	7.5	1.0	29.0	10.5		1.0	4.5	4.5	—N/a	1.0
13–18 Feb 2020	SWG	1,000	17.0	24.0	4.0	7.5	2.0	22.0	7.0	3.0	4.5	3.0	6.0	—N/a	2.0

== Results ==
20–21 September 2020 Ligurian regional election results
Candidates	Votes	%	Seats	Parties	Votes	%	Seats
Giovanni Toti	383,053	56.13	1	Let's Change with Toti for President	141,552	22.60	8
Giovanni Toti	383,053	56.13	1	League	107,371	17.14	6
Giovanni Toti	383,053	56.13	1	Brothers of Italy	68,062	10.87	3
Giovanni Toti	383,053	56.13	1	Forza Italia – Popular Liguria	33,040	5.27	1
Giovanni Toti	383,053	56.13	1	Union of the Centre	4,086	0.65	–
Giovanni Toti	383,053	56.13	1	Total	354,111	56.53	18
Ferruccio Sansa	265,506	38.90	1	Democratic Party – Article One	124,586	19.89	6
Ferruccio Sansa	265,506	38.90	1	Five Star Movement	48,722	7.78	2
Ferruccio Sansa	265,506	38.90	1	Ferruccio Sansa for President	44,700	7.14	2
Ferruccio Sansa	265,506	38.90	1	Shared Line – Left for Sansa	15,451	2.47	1
Ferruccio Sansa	265,506	38.90	1	Green Europe – Solidary Democracy – Democratic Centre	9,193	1.47	–
Ferruccio Sansa	265,506	38.90	1	Total	242,652	38.74	11
Aristide Massardo	16,546	2.42	–	Massardo for President (PSI – +E – IV)	15,081	2.41	–
Alice Salvatore	6,088	0.89	–	The Common Sense	5,315	0.85	–
Giacomo Chiappori	3,569	0.52	–	Great Liguria	3,063	0.49	–
Riccardo Benetti	3,165	0.46	–	Now – Respect for all Animals	2,665	0.43	–
Gaetano Russo	1,614	0.24	–	The People of the Family	1,361	0.22	–
Marika Cassimatis	1,244	0.18	–	Constitutional Base	911	0.15	–
Davide Visigalli	1,129	0.17	–	Reconquer Italy	905	0.14	–
Caro Carpi	576	0.08	–	Carlo Carpi List – GRAF	361	0.06	–
Blank and invalid votes	33,665	4.70					
Total candidates	682,490	100.00	2	Total parties	626,425	100.00	29
Registered voters/turnout	1,360,604	53.42					
Source: Ministry of the Interior – Results

Popular vote
C!	22.60%
PD	19.89%
Lega	17.14%
FdI	10.87%
M5S	7.78%
Sansa	7.14%
FI	5.27%
SpS	2.47%
IV–PSI–+E	2.41%
Others	4.43%

President
Toti	56.13%
Sansa	38.90%
Massardo	2.47%
Others	2.50%

Seats summary
Centre-right	61.29%
Centre-left–M5S	38.71%

=== Turnout ===
Region	Time			
Region	20 Sep			21 Sep
Region	12:00	19:00	23:00	15:00
Liguria	13.95%	32.07%	39.80%	53.46%
Province	Time			
Province	20 Sep			21 Sep
Province	12:00	19:00	23:00	15:00
Genoa	14.17%	32.32%	40.09%	53.51%
Imperia	12.97%	30.17%	37.15%	50.19%
La Spezia	13.08%	31.18%	39.47%	54.09%
Savona	14.67%	33.44%	41.18%	55.28%
Source: Ministry of the Interior – Turnout

== See also ==
- 2020 Italian regional elections
