= 1995 Ligurian regional election =

- 23 April 1995
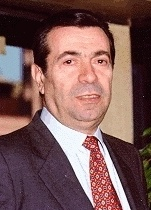

	Majority party	Minority party
Leader	Giancarlo Mori	Sergio Magliola
Party	PPI	Independent
Alliance	Centre-left	Centre-right
Seats won	27	14
Popular vote	445,340	399,405
Percentage	42.4%	38.0%
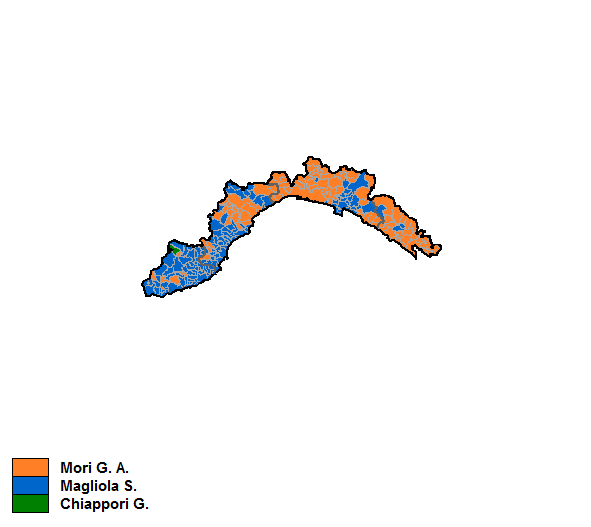
President before election
Giancarlo Mori
PPI
Subsequent President
Giancarlo Mori
PPI

The Ligurian regional election of 1995 took place on 23 April 1995.

For the first time the President of the Region was directly elected by the people, although the election was not yet binding and the President-elect could have been replaced during the term.

Giancarlo Mori (People's Party), who had been President since 1994, was elected President of the Region, defeating Sergio Magliola (Forza Italia).

== Electoral system ==
Regional elections in Liguria were ruled by the "Tatarella law" (approved in 1995), which provided for a mixed electoral system: four fifths of the regional councilors were elected in provincial constituencies by proportional representation, using the largest remainder method with a droop quota and open lists, while the residual votes and the unassigned seats were grouped into a "single regional constituency", where the whole ratios and the highest remainders were divided with the Hare method among the provincial party lists; one fifth of the council seats instead was reserved for regional lists and assigned with a majoritarian system: the leader of the regional list that scored the highest number of votes was elected to the presidency of the Region while the other candidates were elected regional councilors.

A threshold of 3% had been established for the provincial lists, which, however, could still have entered the regional council if the regional list to which they were connected had scored at least 5% of valid votes.

The panachage was also allowed: the voter can indicate a candidate for the presidency but prefer a provincial list connected to another candidate.

== Parties and candidates ==
Political party or alliance	Constituent lists	Previous result		Candidate
Political party or alliance	Constituent lists	Votes (%)	Seats	Candidate
Centre-left coalition	Democratic Party of the Left	28.4	12	Giancarlo Mori
Centre-left coalition	Populars	27.5	12	Giancarlo Mori
Centre-left coalition	Federation of the Greens	5.7	2	Giancarlo Mori
Centre-left coalition	Pact of Democrats	—N/a	—N/a	Giancarlo Mori
Centre-left coalition	Pact of Solidarity	—N/a	—N/a	Giancarlo Mori
Centre-left coalition	Labour Federation	—N/a	—N/a	Giancarlo Mori
Centre-left coalition	Independent Democratic Movement	—N/a	—N/a	Giancarlo Mori
Northern League Liguria		6.1	2	Giacomo Chiappori
Centre-right coalition	National Alliance	3.4	1	Sergio Magliola
Centre-right coalition	Forza Italia – The People's Pole	—N/a	—N/a	Sergio Magliola
Centre-right coalition	Christian Democratic Centre	—N/a	—N/a	Sergio Magliola
Pensioners' Party		1.8	1	Elisabetta Fatuzzo
Pannella List		1.4	1	Vittorio Pezzuto
Communist Refoundation Party		—N/a	—N/a	Giuseppe Tarantino

== Results ==
23 April 1995 Liguria regional election results
Candidates	Votes	%	Seats	Parties	Votes	%	Seats
Giancarlo Mori	445,340	42.41	8				
Giancarlo Mori	445,340	42.41	8	Democratic Party of the Left	290,829	30.30	14
Giancarlo Mori	445,340	42.41	8	Populars	54,843	5.71	3
Giancarlo Mori	445,340	42.41	8	Pact of Democrats	34,127	3.56	1
Giancarlo Mori	445,340	42.41	8	Federation of the Greens	28,101	2.93	1
Giancarlo Mori	445,340	42.41	8	Pact of Solidarity	9,040	0.94	–
Giancarlo Mori	445,340	42.41	8	Labour Federation	4,345	0.45	–
Giancarlo Mori	445,340	42.41	8	Independent Democratic Movement	787	0.08	–
Giancarlo Mori	445,340	42.41	8	Total	422,072	43.97	19
Sergio Magliola	399,405	38.03	–				
Sergio Magliola	399,405	38.03	–	Forza Italia – The People's Pole	234,151	24.39	9
Sergio Magliola	399,405	38.03	–	National Alliance	107,557	11.20	4
Sergio Magliola	399,405	38.03	–	Christian Democratic Centre	25,447	2.65	1
Sergio Magliola	399,405	38.03	–	Total	367,155	38.25	14
Giuseppe Tarantino	90,550	8.62	–	Communist Refoundation Party	76,507	7.97	2
Giacomo Chiappori	68,706	6.54	–	Northern League Liguria	62,755	6.54	2
Elisabetta Fatuzzo	25,196	2.40	–	Pensioners' Party	14,858	1.55	–
Vittorio Pezzuto	17,533	1.67	–	Pannella List	14,226	1.48	–
Bruno Ravera	3,468	0.33	–	Autonomist Front	3,396	0.25	–
Total candidates	1,050,198	100.00	8	Total parties	959,969	100.00	37
Source: Ministry of the Interior – Historical Archive of Elections
