= Giovanni Caravale =

Italian economist and academic (1935–1997)

Minister of Transport
- In office 17 January 1995 – 16 May 1996
- Prime Minister: Lamberto Dini

Personal details
- Born: 18 August 1935 Rome, Kingdom of Italy
- Died: 29 May 1997 (aged 61) Rome, Italy
- Party: Independent
- Children: 2
- Education: Sapienza University of Rome

Giovanni Caravale (18 August 1935 – 29 May 1997) was an Italian academic and economist. He was the minister of transport between January 1995 and May 1996.

== Early life and education ==
Caravale was born in Rome on 18 August 1935. He completed his primary and secondary education in Rome. He obtained a degree in law from the Sapienza University of Rome.

== Career ==
Following his graduation Caravale worked in the research department of the Banca Nazionale del Lavoro, a credit institution. He became a technical staff of the Italian Senate in 1958. In addition to his post at the Senate he began teaching economics and fiscal policy at the University of Pescara. He lectured political economy at the University of Perugia from 1968 to 1971. He became a full professor in 1972 at the University of Perugia and left his job at the Italian Senate. He worked at the university until 1979 when he joined the Faculty of Political Sciences of his alma mater, Sapienza University of Rome.

Caravale was appointed minister of transportation on 17 January 1995. He served in the cabinet led by Prime Minister Lamberto Dini until 16 May 1996.

After the end of his ministerial role Caravale continued to teach at the Sapienza University of Rome from June 1996.

== Personal life, death and legacy ==
Caravale was married and had two children. He died from a cerebral edema in Rome on 29 May 1997.

A book entitled Competing Economic Theories: Essays in Honour of Giovanni Caravale was published in memory of him in 2002.
