= Sandro Biasotti =

Italian politician (born 1948)

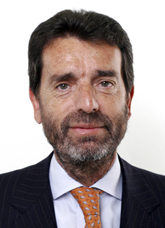

President of Liguria
- In office 12 May 2000 – 14 April 2005
- Preceded by: Giancarlo Mori
- Succeeded by: Claudio Burlando

Member of the Senate
- In office 22 March 2018 – 13 October 2022

Member of the Chamber of Deputies
- In office 29 April 2008 – 22 March 2018

Personal details
- Born: Sandro Mario Biasotti; 2 July 1948 (age 78) Genoa, Italy
- Party: Forza Italia (till 2009); PdL (2009-2013); Forza Italia (2013-2021); Cambiamo! (since 2021)
- Occupation: Entrepreneur, politician

Sandro Biasotti (born 2 July 1948) is an Italian entrepreneur and politician, former President of Liguria from 2000 to 2005.

== Biography ==
Biasotti is the son of an entrepreneur active in the field of freight transport and built an entrepreneurial group of the sector, with fifteen companies throughout Italy. In 1998, Biasotti decided to sell his activities to engage his entrepreneurial energies in the field of car dealerships.

=== President of Liguria ===
Biasotti entered into politics when he ran for the office of President of Liguria during the 2000 regional election, backed by the House of Freedoms coalition. In April 2000, Biasotti is elected President of Liguria.

Biasotti is remembered for the "Battle of pesto" that, as President of Liguria, launched against the multinational food company Nestlé who was forced to change the name of some of its preserved and not fresh products, which induced to confuse them with pesto. After all the story, the Genovese basil obtained the denomination of protected origin in 2005.

Biasotti tried to run for a second term at the 2005 regional election but is defeated by the Union candidate Claudio Burlando. Biasotti challenged Burlando again in the 2010 regional election, but is defeated once again by the centre-left candidate.

At the 2015 regional election, Biasotti backed the centre-right candidate Giovanni Toti, who is elected President of Liguria.

Since 2014, Biasotti is the regional coordinator of Forza Italia in Liguria, though he tried to resign that same year after the disappointing result of the party at the 2014 European election.

=== Deputy and Senator ===
In 2008 and 2013, Biasotti has been elected to the Chamber of Deputies with The People of Freedom.

In 2018, Biasotti has been elected to the Senate with Forza Italia and is currently serving as Senator.
