= 1990 Ligurian regional election =

The Ligurian regional election of 1990 took place on 6 and 7 May 1990.

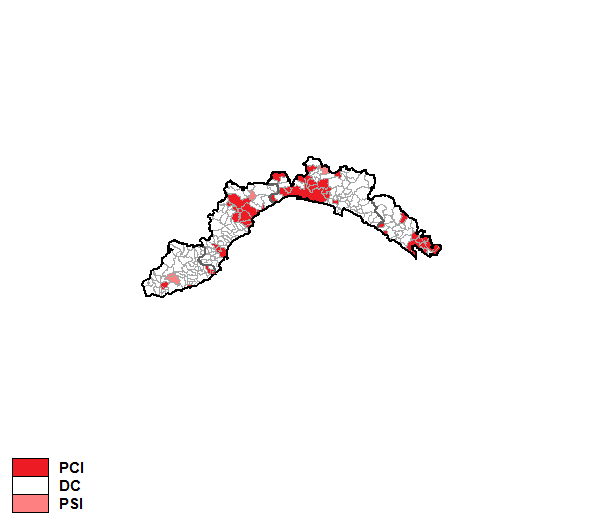
Largest party by municipality

== Events ==
Christian Democracy and the Italian Communist Party lost many votes, especially to Ligurian Union and the Greens. After the election Christian Democrat Giacomo Gualco formed a government with the Italian Socialist Party and their centrist allies (Pentapartito). In 1992 Glauco was replaced by Edmondo Ferrero, to whom Giancarlo Mori succeeded in 1994 with a centre-left majority.

== Results ==
Parties	votes	votes (%)	seats
Italian Communist Party	330,029	28.4	12
Christian Democracy	320,412	27.5	12
Italian Socialist Party	163,512	14.1	6
Northern League Liguria	71,311	6.1	2
Greens (Federation of Green Lists + Rainbow Greens)	66,740	5.7	2
Italian Republican Party	47,728	4.1	1
Italian Social Movement	39,276	3.4	1
Italian Liberal Party	34,930	3.0	1
Italian Democratic Socialist Party	26,503	2.3	1
Pensioners' Party	20,942	1.8	1
Antiprohibitionists on Drugs	16,429	1.4	1
Hunting Fishing Environment	13,484	1.2	-
Proletarian Democracy	12,000	1.0	-
Total	1,163,296	100.0	40

Source: Ministry of the Interior
