= Ligurian Independentist Movement =

Ligurian Independentist Movement Movimento Indipendentista Ligure
- President: Vincenzo Matteucci
- Secretary: Franco Bampi
- Environment responsible: Flavio Gaggero
- Founded: 14 January 2001
- Dissolved: 2015
- Headquarters: Via XX Settembre 21/7; 16121 Genoa
- Ideology: Ligurian independence
- European affiliation: None
- European Parliament group: None
- International affiliation: None

Website
- http://www.mil2002.org

The Ligurian Independentist Movement (Italian: Movimento Indipendentista Ligure, M.I.L.) was a regional political party in Italy.

It was founded in Genoa on 14 January 2001 by a group of citizens, some of them from the Ligurian Lega Nord, belonging to different social classes. Their intent is to recognize the rights to independence from Italian Republic of the populations living in the territory of the former Republic of Genoa. Such Republic became the Ligurian Republic in 1797, it was incorporated in French Empire by Napoleon Bonaparte in 1805, and finally it was annexed to the Kingdom of Sardinia after Congress of Vienna in 1815.

The movement considers that the annexation of the Republic (reconstituted for a brief period in the 1815) to the Kingdom of Sardinia is illegal. In fact, such cancellation would be made without any ratification by the lawful outgoing government, and the following annexation would occur in the absence of any pronouncement of the population, unlike the subsequent annexations of territories that led to the formation of the Kingdom of Italy, sanctioned by popular vote.

== Characteristics and purposes of the movement ==
The movement declared itself cross-party because it considered independence a value of all the people, without care of the party in which everyone can identify.

The movement did not define itself secessionist, because it did not recognize the legitimacy of the annexation to the Kingdom of Sardinia before, and Kingdom of Italy. According to this assumption, Liguria would keep the right to its independence. The claim is based on the principle that the rights of peoples are inalienable and on the following reasons:

- Annexation to House of Savoy, attested by the Congress of Vienna in late 1814, and became operational on January 7, 1815, would be in breach of same purpose for which it was called the Congress (restore sovereignties existed prior to the year 1797) and with the firm opposition of the legitimate and sovereign government of the Republic of Genoa;
- This illegality would not have been remedied by any plebiscite of annexation, neither to the Kingdom of Sardinia nor to the Kingdom of Italy. Plebiscites, however, were made to vote in the other Italian regions.

Independent Liguria suggested by the movement should be a Federal Republic, which would ensure the maximum autonomy to all Ligurian communities, on the model of the Swiss Confederation.

The area concerned to the independence instance is the territory of the former Republic of Genoa, which includes the current Liguria and the lands, called Oltregiogo Ligure that have been assigned to the Province of Alessandria and Piedmont by Rattazzi Law in 1859 and the island of Capraia assigned to the Province of Livorno as a result of the Royal Decree No. 2111 dated 15 November 1925. Ligurian people is intended as consisting not on ethnic or birth base, but by all people who choose to live in the lands of Liguria.

The four core values that the movement aims to support are: democracy, non-violence, pacifism, solidarity. Additional values inspiring the movement are:

- Centrality and importance of work.
- Solidarity and protection of the weakest.
- Absolute separation between Church and civil power.
- Religious tolerance and ostracism to any fundamentalism.
- Republican government.
- Ligurian internal system federalist, light and with little bureaucracy.
- Supervision on the work of the ruling class
- Political organization based on the rejection of tyranny.

== Activities ==
The main activity of the movement was the promotion of traditions, especially cultural and historical, of the Ligurian territory and exploitation of specific features, particularly language, of its community. Furthermore, movement was working with local institutions (Region, Provinces, Municipalities) for their recognition of inalienable Liguria's rights, and for issues related to daily battles and about the territory.

The movement uses various means to show its activities and achievements, such as leaflets, mailing list and propaganda activities by groups of volunteers.

Among the results: the naming of a square of Genoa dedicated to the former Republic of Genoa, and the posting of a plaque on the monument to Vittorio Emanuele II, which explains the role that the king had during the Revolt of Genoa in 1849.
