= Andrea Corrado =

Italian ship-owner

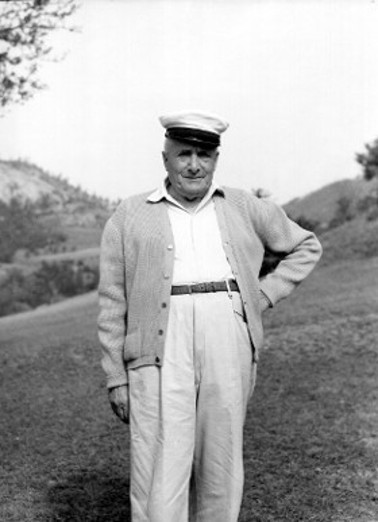
- Andrea Corrado
- Born: 15 October 1873; Albissola Marina, Italy
- Died: 1963; Genoa, Italy
- Occupations: Ship-owner; Businessman

Andrea Corrado (Albissola Marina, 15 October 1873 – Genoa, 1963) was an Italian ship-owner.

== Early life ==
The son of a well known Genoese boat builder, Andrea Corrado completed his Shipmaster examination at age 17, and by 1892 had advanced to the rank of first officer. He became a Captain shortly thereafter and became known for his exemplary ship maneuvering skills. This led to him becoming the head of the Genoa Maritime Pilots.

== Shipowning career ==
The first historical record of Andrea Corrado as a ship owner (and by extension investor) was in 1908, when he acquired the "Castagna".

By 1917, he had organically grown his fleet to five vessels; three steamships and two Brigs.

=== Inter war years ===
The fleet experienced heavy losses during World War I, with italy joining the Triple Entente, but through both strong cashflows and strategic diplomacy, he successfully rebuilt and expanded his fleet, taking advantage of vessels made available by the British Shipping Controller, an institution created by the Lloyd George coalition government in 1916. These ships were called Standard Vessels.

By 1919, his fleet had expanded through both direct and indirect investments in merchant vessels. When he invested indirectly, he did so through both joint ventures and equity stakes in other Genoese ship owners. In the latter case, he always held a controlling stake.

In 1931, Corrado was awarded the honour of the Knights of Labor, and by 1932, his fleet, operating under the corporate structures “Corrado di Navigazione” and “Polena” had grown to become one of the largest diversified private fleets in Europe. His ships were active in many Mediterranean ports and on both shores of the Atlantic.

In 1936, Andrea Corrado acquired ten additional vessels from the state owned “La Meridonale di Navigazione” and between this time and 1939, at the dawn of World War II, his fleet had grown to between 35 and 40 vessels according to historical records.

The fleet was largely destroying during World War II; many units were sunk by British intelligence, others sank from damage caused by naval mines. Others were confiscated by the Italian Royal Navy and used in the war effort.

=== Post war years ===
Corrado was one of the first to capitalise on Marshall Plan financing to rebuild his fleet. His son, Giovanni Battista, who was a decorated pilot of military aviation, led a delegation of Italian entrepreneurs to the United States. They were received by US President Harry Truman, who agreed that warships would be made available as compensation for war damage. These ships were called "Liberties" but many in the Italian shipping community questioned the feasibility of successfully converting them for commercial purposes. Corrado was convinced that appropriate technical interventions could make them more suitable for merchant transport. For this reason, he decided to expose himself personally by defending this project in Confitarma (Association of Italian Shipowners); often in the face of strong opposition from other Italian shipowners. His efforts paid off, and Italy became a significant beneficiary of the Liberties program. The Liberties were instrumental to European post-war reconstruction, and subsequent economic growth. Corrado built out his fleet but also diversified into maritime insurance and real estate initiatives.

In 1961, Andrea Corrado and his son Giovanni Battista, oversaw the construction of one of the first modern dry bulk Merchant ships, characterised by scaled cargo intake and technology assisted navigation. Many of these technological advances paved the way for the super-bulker, and super-tanker era that followed.

=== Death and legacy ===
Andrea Corrado died in Genoa in 1963 and is buried in the Monumental Cemetery of Staglieno in Genoa. As a testimony to his significant contribution to the Italian Maritime industry, a city square was named after him in central Genoa. His history is recounted today in the hall of fame of the largest Maritime Museum in the Mediterranean, Galata MuMa.

== Bibliography ==
- Colin Stewart, "Flags, Funnels and Hull Colours", Adlard Coles, 1963
- Pro Schiaffino, "Le Carrette degli Armatori Genovesi", Nuova Editrice Genovese, 1996
- Roger W. Jordan, "The World’s Merchant Fleets 1939", Chatham Publishing Lionel Leventhal Ltd., 1999
- GB Corrado, "The H Bomb of Economics", Edizioni GMT, 2009
- Carlo Otto Guglielmino, "Vento di Genova", Edizioni Liguria, 1963
