= Giacomo Gualco =

Italian politician

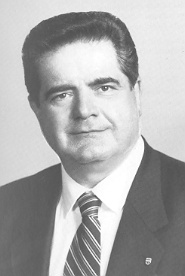
Giacomo Gualco

Giacomo Gualco (30 December 1936 – 6 November 2011) was an Italian politician who served as the President of Liguria from September 1990 to January 1992. He died on November 6, 2011, at the age of 75.

== See also ==
- Giacomo Gualco in Italian Language
