= 2000 Ligurian regional election =

- 16 April 2000
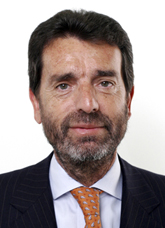

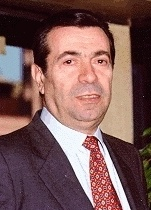
| | Majority party | Minority party |
|---|---|---|
| Leader | Sandro Biasotti | Giancarlo Mori |
| Party | Forza Italia | PPI |
| Alliance | Pole for Freedoms | The Olive Tree |
| Seats won | 24 | 16 |
| Seat change | ▲8 | ▼13 |
| Popular vote | 475,308 | 431,743 |
| Percentage | 50.7% | 46.1% |
| Swing | ▲6.1% | ▼5.0% |
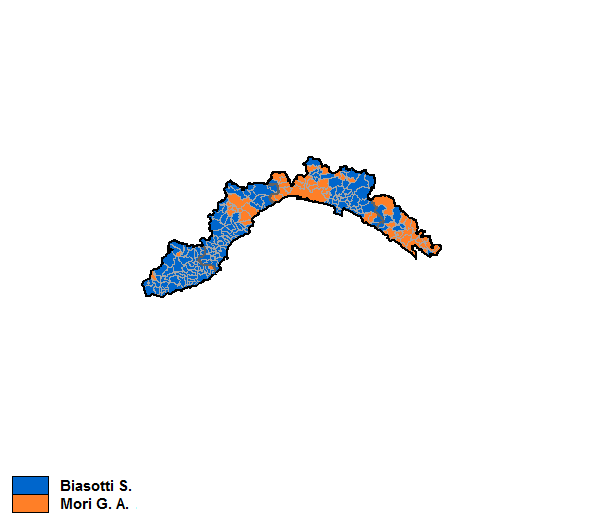
President before election
Giancarlo Mori
PPI
Subsequent President
Sandro Biasotti
FI

The Ligurian regional election of 2000 took place on 16 April 2000. Sandro Biasotti (an independent close to Forza Italia) was elected president, defeating incumbent Giancarlo Mori (PPI).

== Electoral system ==
Regional elections in Liguria were ruled by the "Tatarella law" (approved in 1995), which provided for a mixed electoral system: four fifths of the regional councilors were elected in provincial constituencies by proportional representation, using the largest remainder method with a droop quota and open lists, while the residual votes and the unassigned seats were grouped into a "single regional constituency", where the whole ratios and the highest remainders were divided with the Hare method among the provincial party lists; one fifth of the council seats instead was reserved for regional lists and assigned with a majoritarian system: the leader of the regional list that scored the highest number of votes was elected to the presidency of the Region while the other candidates were elected regional councilors.

A threshold of 3% had been established for the provincial lists, which, however, could still have entered the regional council if the regional list to which they were connected had scored at least 5% of valid votes.

The panachage was also allowed: the voter can indicate a candidate for the presidency but prefer a provincial list connected to another candidate.

== Parties and candidates ==
| Political party or alliance | Constituent lists | Previous result | | Candidate |
| Political party or alliance | Constituent lists | Votes (%) | Seats | Candidate |
|---|---|---|---|---|
| Centre-left coalition | Democrats of the Left | 30.3 | 14 | Giancarlo Mori |
| Centre-left coalition | Communist Refoundation Party | 8.0 | 2 | Giancarlo Mori |
| Centre-left coalition | Italian People's Party – UDEUR | 5.7 | 3 | Giancarlo Mori |
| Centre-left coalition | Federation of the Greens | 2.9 | 1 | Giancarlo Mori |
| Centre-left coalition | Italian Democratic Socialists – Italian Republican Party | —N/a | —N/a | Giancarlo Mori |
| Centre-left coalition | The Democrats | —N/a | —N/a | Giancarlo Mori |
| Centre-left coalition | Party of Italian Communists | —N/a | —N/a | Giancarlo Mori |
| Centre-left coalition | For Italy | —N/a | —N/a | Giancarlo Mori |
| Centre-right coalition | Forza Italia | 24.4 | 9 | Sandro Biasotti |
| Centre-right coalition | National Alliance | 11.2 | 4 | Sandro Biasotti |
| Centre-right coalition | Northern League Liguria | 6.5 | 2 | Sandro Biasotti |
| Centre-right coalition | Christian Democratic Centre | 2.7 | 1 | Sandro Biasotti |
| Centre-right coalition | Pensioners' Party | 1.6 | – | Sandro Biasotti |
| Centre-right coalition | New Liguria | —N/a | —N/a | Sandro Biasotti |
| Centre-right coalition | United Christian Democrats | —N/a | —N/a | Sandro Biasotti |
| Centre-right coalition | Animalist Liguria | —N/a | —N/a | Sandro Biasotti |
| Pannella List | | 1.5 | – | Mario Tarantino |
| Humanist Party | | —N/a | —N/a | Irene Menghini |

== Results ==
16 April 2000 Ligurian regional election results
| Candidates | Votes | % | Seats | Parties | Votes | % | Seat |
|---|---|---|---|---|---|---|---|
| Sandro Biasotti | 475,308 | 50.71 | 8 | | | | |
| Sandro Biasotti | 475,308 | 50.71 | 8 | Forza Italia | 240,789 | 27.27 | 10 |
| Sandro Biasotti | 475,308 | 50.71 | 8 | National Alliance | 90,396 | 10.24 | 3 |
| Sandro Biasotti | 475,308 | 50.71 | 8 | Northern League Liguria | 38,104 | 4.32 | 1 |
| Sandro Biasotti | 475,308 | 50.71 | 8 | New Liguria | 24,943 | 2.83 | 1 |
| Sandro Biasotti | 475,308 | 50.71 | 8 | Christian Democratic Centre | 22,959 | 2.60 | 1 |
| Sandro Biasotti | 475,308 | 50.71 | 8 | United Christian Democrats | 15,837 | 1.79 | – |
| Sandro Biasotti | 475,308 | 50.71 | 8 | Animalist Liguria | 11,984 | 1.36 | – |
| Sandro Biasotti | 475,308 | 50.71 | 8 | Pensioners' Party | 6,488 | 0.73 | – |
| Sandro Biasotti | 475,308 | 50.71 | 8 | Total | 451,500 | 51.14 | 16 |
| Giancarlo Mori | 431,743 | 46.07 | 1 | | | | |
| Giancarlo Mori | 431,743 | 46.07 | 1 | Democrats of the Left | 231,496 | 26.22 | 9 |
| Giancarlo Mori | 431,743 | 46.07 | 1 | Communist Refoundation Party | 57,619 | 6.53 | 2 |
| Giancarlo Mori | 431,743 | 46.07 | 1 | Italian People's Party – UDEUR | 37,351 | 4.23 | 1 |
| Giancarlo Mori | 431,743 | 46.07 | 1 | The Democrats | 25,285 | 2.86 | 1 |
| Giancarlo Mori | 431,743 | 46.07 | 1 | Federation of the Greens | 18,541 | 2.10 | 1 |
| Giancarlo Mori | 431,743 | 46.07 | 1 | Italian Democratic Socialists – Italian Republican Party | 17,284 | 1.96 | 1 |
| Giancarlo Mori | 431,743 | 46.07 | 1 | Party of Italian Communists | 16,507 | 1.87 | – |
| Giancarlo Mori | 431,743 | 46.07 | 1 | For Italy | 2,806 | 0.32 | – |
| Giancarlo Mori | 431,743 | 46.07 | 1 | Total | 406,889 | 46.09 | 15 |
| Mario Tarantino | 24,168 | 2.58 | – | Bonino List | 20,962 | 2.37 | – |
| Irene Menghini | 6,028 | 0.64 | – | Humanist Party | 3,473 | 0.39 | – |
| Total candidates | 937,247 | 100.00 | 9 | Total parties | 882,824 | 100.00 | 31 |
Source: Ministry of the Interior – Historical Archive of Elections
