= 2005 Ligurian regional election =

Italian regional election

- 3–4 April 2005
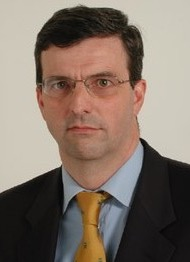

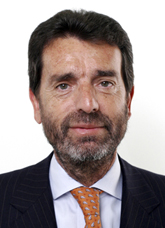
	Majority party	Minority party
Leader	Claudio Burlando	Sandro Biasotti
Party	DS	Forza Italia
Alliance	The Union	House of Freedoms
Seats won	26	14
Seat change	▲10	▼10
Popular vote	491,545	434,934
Percentage	52.6%	46.6%
Swing	▲6.5%	▼4.1%
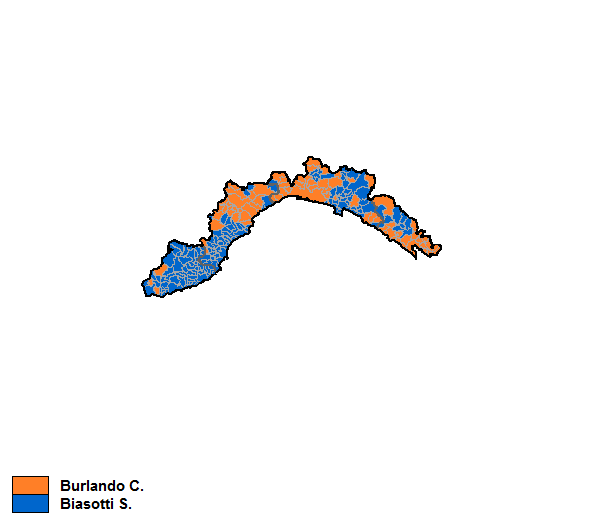
President before election
Sandro Biasotti
FI
Subsequent President
Claudio Burlando
DS

The Ligurian regional election of 2005 took place on 3–4 April 2005. Claudio Burlando (Democrats of the Left) defeated incumbent Sandro Biasotti (an independent close to Forza Italia).

== Electoral system ==
Regional elections in Liguria were ruled by the "Tatarella law" (approved in 1995), which provided for a mixed electoral system: four fifths of the regional councilors were elected in provincial constituencies by proportional representation, using the largest remainder method with a droop quota and open lists, while the residual votes and the unassigned seats were grouped into a "single regional constituency", where the whole ratios and the highest remainders were divided with the Hare method among the provincial party lists; one fifth of the council seats instead was reserved for regional lists and assigned with a majoritarian system: the leader of the regional list that scored the highest number of votes was elected to the presidency of the Region while the other candidates were elected regional councilors.

A threshold of 3% had been established for the provincial lists, which, however, could still have entered the regional council if the regional list to which they were connected had scored at least 5% of valid votes.

The panachage was also allowed: the voter can indicate a candidate for the presidency but prefer a provincial list connected to another candidate.

== Parties and candidates ==
Political party or alliance	Constituent lists	Previous result		Candidate
Political party or alliance	Constituent lists	Votes (%)	Seats	Candidate
House of Freedoms	Forza Italia	20.2	8	Sandro Biasotti
House of Freedoms	National Alliance	10.2	3	Sandro Biasotti
House of Freedoms	Union of Christian and Centre Democrats	4.4	1	Sandro Biasotti
House of Freedoms	Northern League Liguria	4.3	1	Sandro Biasotti
House of Freedoms	New Liguria	2.8	1	Sandro Biasotti
House of Freedoms	Biasotti List	—N/a	—N/a	Sandro Biasotti
House of Freedoms	Others	—N/a	—N/a	Sandro Biasotti
The Union	The Olive Tree	35.3	12	Claudio Burlando
The Union	Communist Refoundation Party	6.5	2	Claudio Burlando
The Union	Federation of the Greens	2.1	1	Claudio Burlando
The Union	Party of Italian Communists	1.9	–	Claudio Burlando
The Union	Pensioners' Party	0.7	–	Claudio Burlando
The Union	People of Liguria	—N/a	—N/a	Claudio Burlando
The Union	Italy of Values	—N/a	—N/a	Claudio Burlando
The Union	Union of Democrats for Europe	—N/a	—N/a	Claudio Burlando
The Union	Others	—N/a	—N/a	Claudio Burlando
Social Alternative (AS–FT–FSN–FN)		—N/a	—N/a	Angelo Riccobaldi

== Results ==
3–4 April 2005 Ligurian regional election results
Candidates	Votes	%	Seats	Parties	Votes	%	Seat
Claudio Burlando	491,545	52.64	8				
Claudio Burlando	491,545	52.64	8	The Olive Tree	279,727	34.35	12
Claudio Burlando	491,545	52.64	8	Communist Refoundation Party	53,626	6.59	2
Claudio Burlando	491,545	52.64	8	People of Liguria	35,831	4.40	1
Claudio Burlando	491,545	52.64	8	Party of Italian Communists	21,877	2.69	1
Claudio Burlando	491,545	52.64	8	Federation of the Greens	16,089	1.98	1
Claudio Burlando	491,545	52.64	8	Italy of Values	10,611	1.30	1
Claudio Burlando	491,545	52.64	8	Union of Democrats for Europe	7,707	0.95	–
Claudio Burlando	491,545	52.64	8	Pensioners' Party	6,926	0.85	–
Claudio Burlando	491,545	52.64	8	Consumers	1,774	0.22	–
Claudio Burlando	491,545	52.64	8	Pact of Liberal Democrats	449	0.06	–
Claudio Burlando	491,545	52.64	8	Total	434,617	53.37	18
Sandro Biasotti	434,934	46.58	1				
Sandro Biasotti	434,934	46.58	1	Forza Italia	160,305	19.69	6
Sandro Biasotti	434,934	46.58	1	Biasotti List	71,067	8.73	3
Sandro Biasotti	434,934	46.58	1	National Alliance	58,221	7.15	2
Sandro Biasotti	434,934	46.58	1	Northern League Liguria	38,060	4.67	1
Sandro Biasotti	434,934	46.58	1	Union of Christian and Centre Democrats	26,639	3.27	1
Sandro Biasotti	434,934	46.58	1	New Liguria	5,857	0.72	–
Sandro Biasotti	434,934	46.58	1	Socialists and Liberals	5,745	0.71	–
Sandro Biasotti	434,934	46.58	1	Consumers' List	4,495	0.55	–
Sandro Biasotti	434,934	46.58	1	Pensioners and Disabled – Animalists and Environmentalists	3,888	0.48	–
Sandro Biasotti	434,934	46.58	1	Total	374,277	45.96	13
Angelo Riccobaldi	7,313	0.78	–	Social Alternative	5,441	0.67	–
Total candidates	933,792	100.00	9	Total parties	814,335	100.00	31
Source: Ministry of the Interior – Historical Archive of Elections
