= Cambiamo! =

Italian political party

- President: Giovanni Toti
- Founded: 7 August 2019
- Dissolved: 28 April 2022 (de facto)
- Split from: Forza Italia
- Merged into: Italy in the Centre
- Headquarters: Piazza Madama 9, Rome
- Ideology: Liberal conservatism
- Political position: Centre-right
- National affiliation: Centre-right coalition
- Colours: Orange Blue

Website
- cambiamo.eu

Cambiamo! (lit. 'Let's Change!', also stylized as C!) was a centre-right political party in Italy, led by Giovanni Toti.

== History ==
=== Background and beginnings ===
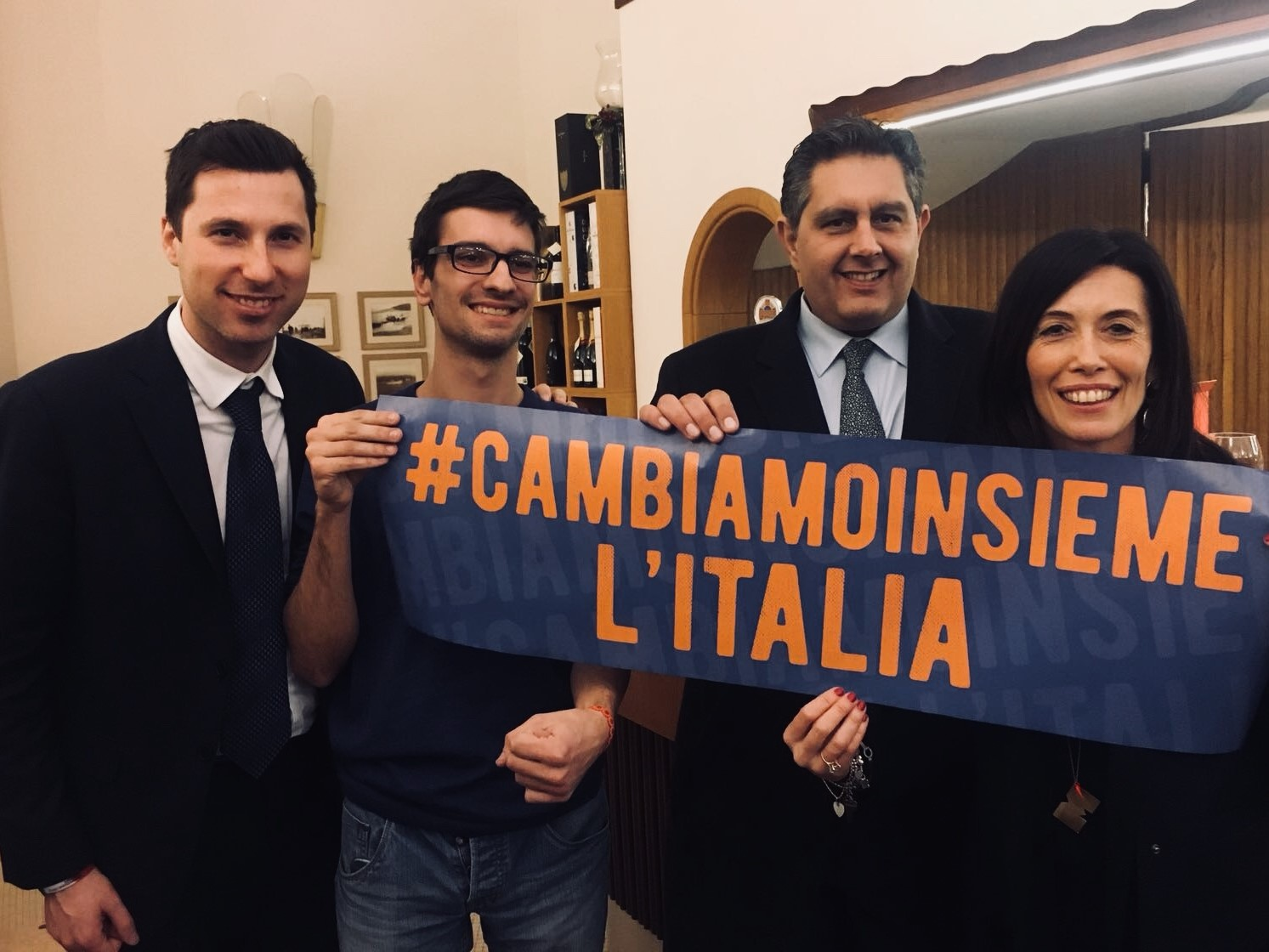
Giovanni Toti with supporters

In June 2019, after the European Parliament election, Silvio Berlusconi appointed Giovanni Toti, president of Liguria, and Mara Carfagna, a former minister, national coordinators of Forza Italia (FI), with the goal of reforming and relaunching the party. However, after a few weeks, Toti left the party in opposition to Berlusconi, who had not endorsed Toti's proposal for open primaries, and launched Cambiamo!. The reasons of the split were FI's lack of internal democracy and lack of clarity on the alliance with the League and the Brothers of Italy (FdI) at country-level, which he definitely supported.

In September four deputies (Stefano Benigni, Manuela Gagliardi, Claudio Pedrazzini and Alessandro Sorte) officially left FI in order to join C! Along with a fifth deputy who had earlier left FI (Giorgio Silli), they renamed the "Dream Italy–10 Times Better" sub-group within the Mixed Group as "Cambiamo!–10 Times Better". Additionally, four senators (Massimo Vittorio Berutti, Gaetano Quagliariello, Paolo Romani and Luigi Vitali), as well as several regional councillors from Lombardy (including Romani's son) and Lazio followed suit.

=== Centrist turn ===
In the 2020 Emilia-Romagna regional election C! ran in a joint list with The People of the Family, gaining 0.3% of the vote. In the 2020 Ligurian regional election party leader Toti was re-elected president with 56.1% of the vote, while C! (full name: Cambiamo con Toti Presidente) gained 22.6% of the vote. In the 2020 Tuscan regional election the party obtained 1.0% of the vote and no seats.

Despite its beginnings, by the end of 2020 C! became a proponent of a more moderate version of conservatism in comparison with FI. The party thus gave strong support to the formation of a national unity government as a replacement of Giuseppe Conte's centre-left government. In February 2021, amid the formation of Mario Draghi's national unity government, which was supported also by the League and FI, as well as by the main centre-left parties, C! started to attract new members from the more centrist wing of FI. As a result, the party was able to form a larger sub-group within the Chamber's Mixed Group, comprising ten deputies (including eight who were full members of the party).

In May 2021 C! was a founding member of a new joint party named Coraggio Italia (CI), whose main leaders were Toti and Luigi Brugnaro, mayor of Venice. CI formed a parliamentary group in the Chamber with more than 20 deputies. However, two C! deputies, Benigni and Sorte, left the party.

=== Italy in the Centre ===
In less than a year, CI, which had failed to attract substantial support among voters, according to opinion polls, experienced an internal crisis. On one side Toti wanted to form an alliance with Matteo Renzi's Italia Viva party and launched a new political party named Italy in the Centre (IaC), on the other side Brugnaro rejected establishment politics and wanted to continue to be part of the centre-right coalition. In February 2022 CI's sub-group within the Mixed Group, previously named "IDeA–Cambiamo!–Europeanists", was re-named "Italy in the Centre". In March, a federation between Coraggio Italia and Italy in the Centre was announced, stating that they would have different organisations and parliamentary groupings. In May, during a meeting of the national leadership, a provisional statute of Italy in the Centre was approved and regional coordinators and a secretariat were appointed, practically supplanting Cambiamo!.

In the 2022 local elections CI and IaC ran separately in most places. CI obtained relevant results only in Veneto, Brugnaro's home-region, most notably 5.2% in Verona and 4.4% in Padua, while IaC won 9.2% in Genoa, 8.5% in La Spezia, 3.7% in Rieti, 5.2% in L'Aquila and 4.3% in Catanzaro, where another list named "Cambiamo!" obtained 5.3% of the vote.

In late June 2022 CI and IaC formally split both in the Chamber of Deputies and the Senate.

As of mid 2022 C! is mostly inactive. Its Facebook page is no longer visible, and its official website has not been updated since the summer of 2021.

== Election results ==
=== Regional Councils ===
Region	Election year	Votes	%	Seats	+/–
Liguria	2020	141,552 (1st)	22.60	9 / 31	New
Tuscany	2020	into Civic Tuscany		0 / 37	–
Emilia-Romagna	2020	6,341 (Note: In a joint list with The People of the Family .)	0.29	0 / 50	–

== Leadership ==
- President: Giovanni Toti
