= 1970 Ligurian regional election =

The Ligurian regional election of 1970 took place on 7–8 June 1970.

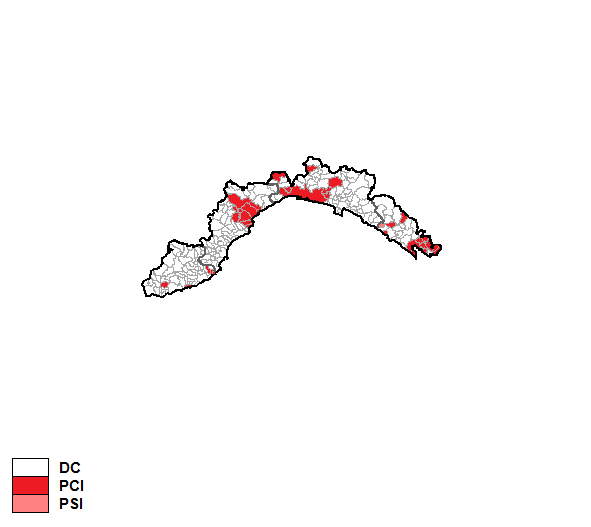
Largest party by municipality

== Events ==
Christian Democracy was the largest party and, narrowly ahead of the Italian Communist Party. After the election, Christian Democrat Gianni Dagnino formed a government comprising the Italian Socialist Party, the Unitary Socialist Party and the Italian Republican Party (organic centre-left).

== Results ==
Party	votes	votes (%)	seats
Christian Democracy	393,478	32.1	14
Italian Communist Party	383,296	31.3	13
Italian Socialist Party	138,439	11.3	4
Unitary Socialist Party	93,507	7.6	3
Italian Liberal Party	90,058	7.4	3
Italian Social Movement	46,293	3.8	1
Italian Republican Party	37,684	3.1	1
Italian Socialist Party of Proletarian Unity	35,156	2.9	1
Italian Democratic Party of Monarchist Unity	7,574	0.6	-
Total	1,225,485	100.0	40

Source: Ministry of the Interior
