= 1980 Ligurian regional election =

3rd election of the Council and the President of the Region of Liguria, Italy

The Ligurian regional election of 1980 took place on 8 June 1980.

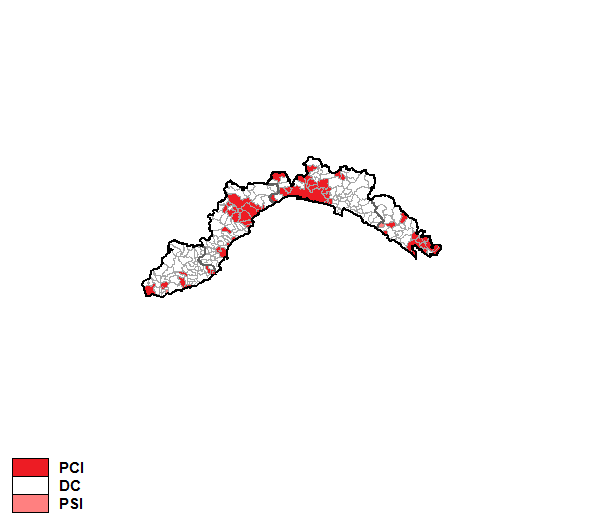
Largest party by municipality

== Events ==
The Italian Communist Party resulted the largest party, but lost some ground from five years before. After the election, Christian Democracy, the Italian Democratic Socialist Party, the Italian Liberal Party and the Italian Republican Party were able to form a government led by Republican Giovanni Persico (Organic centre-left), ousting the outgoing Communist-Socialist coalition government.

The Italian Socialist Party eventually joined the government in 1981 and Alberto Teardo, a Socialist, became President of the Region. Teardo was replaced by fellow Socialist Rinaldo Magnani, a centrist, in 1983.

== Results ==
Party	votes	votes (%)	seats
Italian Communist Party	444,177	36.1	15
Christian Democracy	377,955	30.7	13
Italian Socialist Party	165,438	13.4	5
Italian Liberal Party	55,885	4.5	2
Italian Democratic Socialist Party	55,561	4.5	2
Italian Social Movement	51,763	4.2	2
Italian Republican Party	38,724	3.2	1
Proletarian Democracy	13,919	1.1	-
Proletarian Unity Party	11,858	1.0	-
Union of Pensioners and People Retiring	10,891	0.9	-
New Coast	4,197	0.3	-
Revolutionary Communist League	881	0.1	-
Total	1,231,249	100.0	40

Source: Ministry of the Interior
