= Edoardo Rixi =

Italian politician (born 1974)

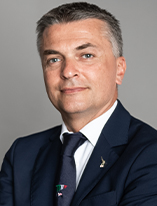

Deputy Minister of Infrastructure and Sustainable Mobility
- Incumbent
- Assumed office 31 October 2022

Deputy Minister of Infrastructure and Transport
- In office 11 June 2018 – 30 May 2019

Member of the Chamber of Deputies
- Incumbent
- Assumed office 13 October 2022
- In office 23 March 2018 – 12 October 2022
- Constituency: Liguria
- In office 29 April 2008 – 8 June 2010
- Constituency: Liguria

Personal details
- Born: 8 June 1974 (age 51) Genoa
- Party: Lega Nord (2002–2020); Lega (since 2020)
- Spouse: Marzia Vita (m. 2015)
- Children: 1
- Education: Bocconi University
- Alma mater: University of Genoa
- Occupation: Politician

Edoardo Rixi (born 8 June 1974, in Genoa) is an Italian politician.

== Early life and education ==
In 2000, Rixi graduated in economics from the University of Genoa with the thesis:"Dalla crisi degli anni '90 alla moneta unica". In 2014 he attended the Master of Public Administration (SDA Bocconi).

== Political career ==
On 11 June 2018 Edoardo Rixi was appointed Deputy Minister of Infrastructure and Transport of the Conte Cabinet.

== Court proceedings ==
In April 2015 he was investigated for unreasonable public money spending, together with other regional councilors, as part of the survey on "Spese pazze" in the Liguria Region from 2010 to 2012. At the beginning of February 2016 he was sent to trial.

On 30 May 2019 the Court of Genoa sentenced him to three years and five months of imprisonment and the perpetual ban from public offices for the accusation of embezzlement and forgery and € 56,807 was confiscated; the same day Rixi resigned as deputy minister. On 18 March 2021 he was acquitted on appeal because the "fact does not exist". He was definitively acquitted on 15 March 2022.
