= Marco Bucci (politician) =

Italian politician (born 195)

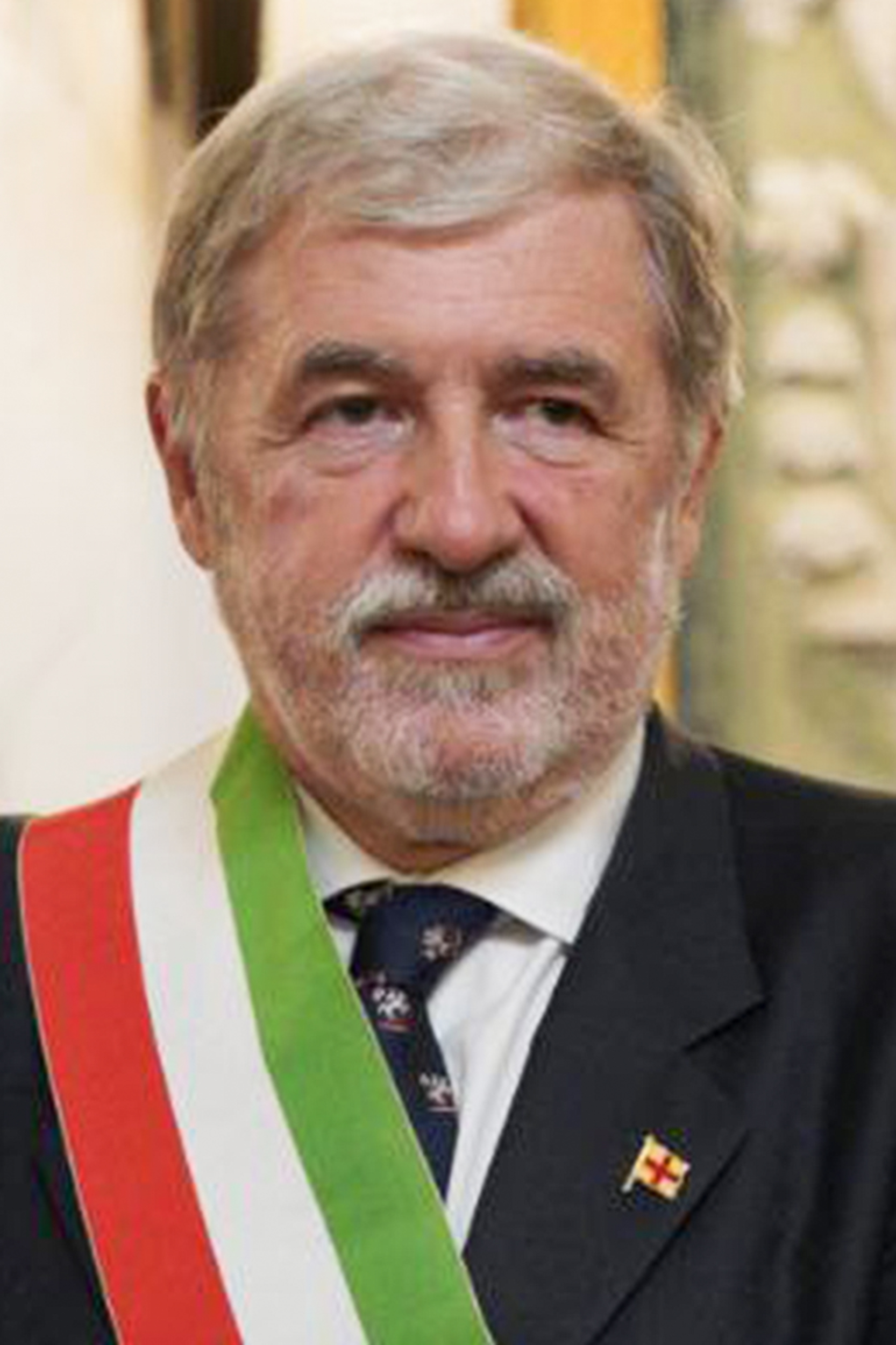

President of Liguria
- Incumbent
- Assumed office 6 November 2024
- Preceded by: Giovanni Toti

Mayor of Genoa
- In office 27 June 2017 – 10 December 2024
- Preceded by: Marco Doria
- Succeeded by: Silvia Salis

Personal details
- Born: 31 October 1959 (age 66) Genoa, Italy
- Party: Centre-right independent
- Education: University of Genoa
- Occupation: Manager

Marco Bucci (born 31 October 1959) is an Italian politician and former pharmaceutical manager.

He is the President of the Liguria region and has been mayor of Genoa from 2017 to 2024.

He is popularly known as the "manager-mayor", due to his presumed pragmatism which allowed him to gain the confidence of the Genoese people.

== Biography ==
Bucci graduated with degrees in chemistry and pharmacy from the University of Genoa in 1985 and worked in the chemical sector from the 1980s until the end of 1990s. From 1999 to 2016 he worked for Kodak and Carestream Health. In his career as a pharmaceutical manager, he worked at Ferrania (Savona), Genoa, Geneva and Rochester. In the 2017 administrative elections, he was a candidate for mayor at the head of a center-right coalition composed of Lega Nord, Forza Italia, Brothers of Italy-National Alliance, Italy-Lista Musso and from the civic list Vince Genoa, with representatives of civil society and candidates of Popular Alternative who had decided not to present their own list.

In the first round, Bucci collected 38.80% of the votes, competing against the center-left Gianni Crivello (33.39%). In the second round of voting on 25 June he was elected first citizen of Genoa with 55.24% of the votes succeeding Marco Doria. He is the first center-right mayor of Genoa since the introduction of the direct election of the mayor in 1975. On 29 September 2017, he was elected President of ANCI Liguria.

Political offices
Preceded by Giovanni Toti	President of Liguria since 2024	Incumbent
Preceded by Marco Doria	Mayor of Genoa; 2017-2024	Succeeded by Silvia Salis
