= 1985 Ligurian regional election =

The Ligurian regional election of 1985 took place on 12 May 1985.

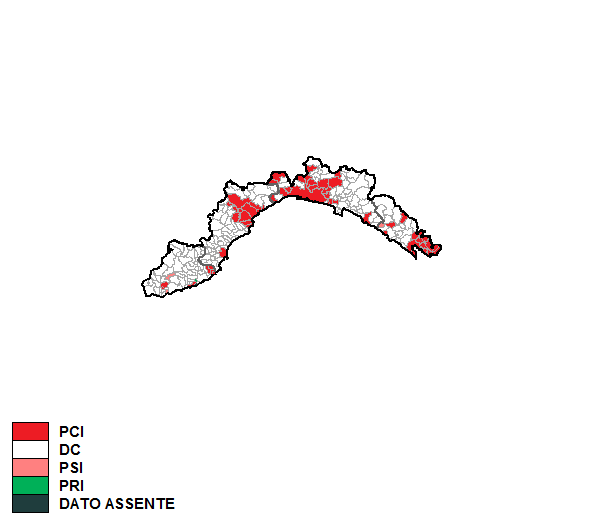
Largest party by municipality

== Events ==
The Italian Communist Party was again the largest party, ahead of Christian Democracy. resulted narrowly ahead of the Italian Communist Party. However, after the election, incumbent President Rinaldo Magnani of the Italian Socialist Party formed a new government with the Christian Democrats and its centrist allies (Pentapartito).

== Results ==
Parties	votes	votes (%)	seats
Italian Communist Party	428,991	34.8	15
Christian Democracy	374,046	30.4	13
Italian Socialist Party	149,443	12.1	4
Italian Social Movement	70,595	5.7	2
Italian Republican Party	52,004	4.2	2
Italian Liberal Party	40,420	3.3	1
Italian Democratic Socialist Party	37,037	3.0	1
Green List	34,605	2.8	1
Proletarian Democracy	18,311	1.5	1
Pensioners' National Party	12,602	1.0	-
Pensioners' Union – Venetian League	10,751	0.9	-
Valdostan Union – Democratic Party – others	2,518	0.2	-
Total	1,231,323	100.0	40

Source: Ministry of the Interior
