= 1975 Ligurian regional election =

The Ligurian regional election of 1975 took place on 15 June 1975.

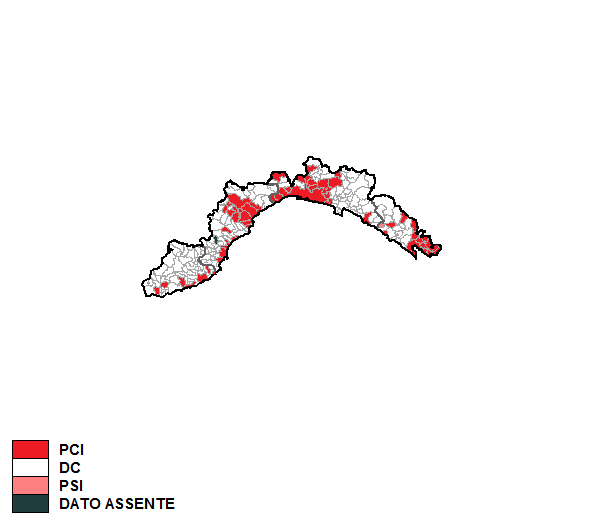
Largest party by municipality

== Events ==
The Italian Communist Party was the largest party, largely ahead of Christian Democracy. After the election, Communist Angelo Carossino formed a government comprising also the Italian Socialist Party (Frontism). Carossino was replaced by Armando Magliotto in 1979.

== Results ==
Parties	votes	votes (%)	seats
Italian Communist Party	500,395	38.4	16
Christian Democracy	396,265	30.4	13
Italian Socialist Party	175,655	13.5	5
Italian Democratic Socialist Party	71,362	5.5	2
Italian Social Movement	60,385	4.6	2
Italian Liberal Party	51,629	4.0	1
Italian Republican Party	45,257	3.5	1
Popular Unity	3,292	0.3	-
Total	1,304,240	100.0	40

Source: Ministry of the Interior
