= Giancarlo Mori =

Italian politician (born 1940)

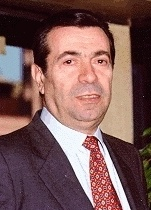

President of Liguria
- In office 20 July 1994 – 12 May 2000
- Preceded by: Edmondo Ferrero
- Succeeded by: Sandro Biasotti

Member of the Regional Council of Liguria
- In office 23 May 1990 – 17 February 2005

President of the Province of Genoa
- In office 11 June 1985 – 2 August 1990
- Preceded by: Elio Carocci
- Succeeded by: Franco Rolandi

Personal details
- Born: 4 November 1938 Genoa, Kingdom of Italy
- Died: 17 April 2019 (aged 80) Genoa, Italy
- Party: Christian Democracy; Italian People's Party; The Daisy; Democratic Party
- Profession: Manager

Giancarlo Mori (4 November 1938 – 17 April 2019) was an Italian politician. A member of the Christian Democracy, the Italian People's Party, The Daisy and later the Democratic Party, he served as president of the Province of Genoa from 1985 to 1990, and president of Liguria from 1994 to 2000.
