= Regional Council of Liguria =

Legislative organ of Liguria, Italy

Regional Council of Liguria Consiglio Regionale della Liguria
- 12th Legislature

Type
- Type: Regional council Unicameral

Leadership
- President: Stefano Balleari, FdI

Structure
- Seats: 31
- Political groups: Government (18): FdI (5); VL–NM (4); Lega (3); FI (3); OL (3); Opposition (13): PD (9); AVS (2); M5S (1); OP (1)

Elections
- Last election: October 27–28, 2024
- Next election: 2029

Meeting place
- Genoa

Website
- Official website

The Regional Council of Liguria (Italian: Consiglio Regionale della Liguria) is the legislative assembly of Liguria.

It was first elected in 1970, when the ordinary regions were instituted, on the basis of the Constitution of Italy of 1948.

== Composition ==
The Regional Council of Liguria was originally composed of 50 regional councillors. Following the decree-law n. 138 of 13 August 2011 the number of regional councillors was reduced to 30, with an additional seat reserved for the President of the Region.

=== Political groups ===
The Regional Council of Liguria is currently composed of the following political groups:

Party	Seats	Status
Democratic Party	9 / 31	In opposition
Brothers of Italy	5 / 31	In government
Liguria Wins – Us Moderates	4 / 31	In government
League	3 / 31	In government
Forza Italia	3 / 31	In government
Pride Liguria – Bucci for President	3 / 31	In government
Greens and Left Alliance	2 / 31	In opposition
Five Star Movement	1 / 31	In opposition
Orlando for President	1 / 31	In opposition

== See also ==
- Regional council
- Politics of Liguria
- President of Liguria
