= Giovanni Toti =

Italian politician (born 1968)

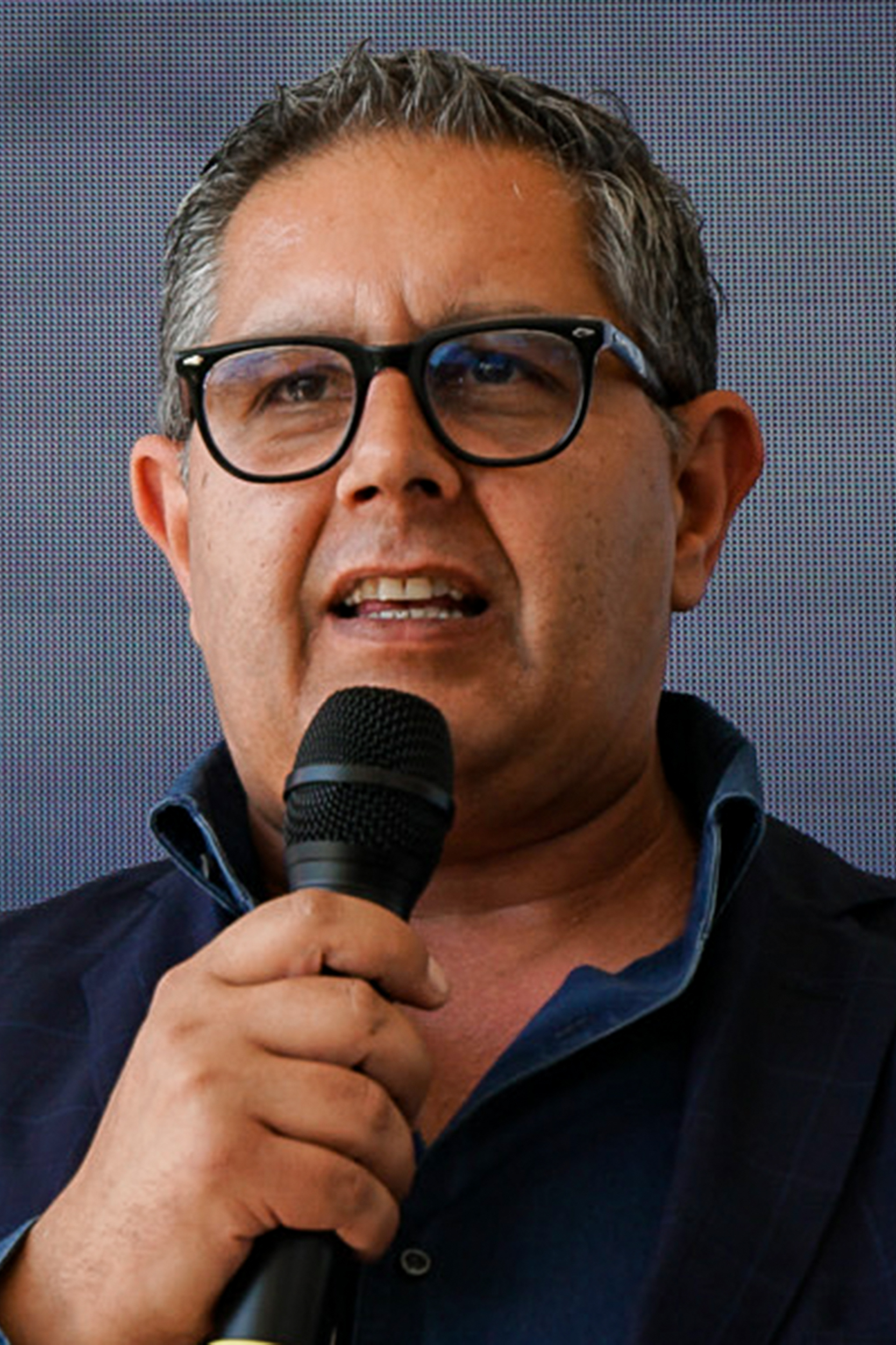

President of Liguria
- In office 11 June 2015 – 26 July 2024
- Preceded by: Claudio Burlando
- Succeeded by: Marco Bucci

Member of the European Parliament
- In office 14 July 2014 – 9 July 2015
- Constituency: North-West Italy

Personal details
- Born: 7 September 1968 (age 58) Viareggio, Italy
- Party: PSI (1982–1990); Forza Italia (2014–2019); Cambiamo! (2019–2022); Italy in the Centre (2022–2023); Us Moderates (since 2023)
- Education: University of Milan
- Profession: Journalist; Politician

Giovanni Toti (born 7 September 1968) is an Italian journalist and politician, who has been President of Liguria from 2015 to 2024. Toti was also elected to the European Parliament, following the 2014 European Parliament election.

== Biography ==
Born in Viareggio in 1968, Toti grew up in Massa Carrara where the family ran a hotel, and he has lived for many years with his family and parents in Bocca di Magra, Ameglia, in the province of La Spezia, Liguria. He graduated in political science from the University of Milan. He is married to the journalist Siria Magri.

During the 1980s he was a member of the youth wing of the Italian Socialist Party, led at the time by Bettino Craxi, Prime Minister from 1983 to 1987, later condemned for corruption, in the trial Mani Pulite.

In 1991, he started working for Studio Aperto, the news program of Silvio Berlusconi's TV channel Italia 1, of which he became director in 2010. In March 2012 Toti became also director of Tg4, replacing the long-time one Emilio Fede.

In January 2014, Toti entered politics as a political counsellor of Berlusconi's party Forza Italia. In the 2014 European elections, he was elected to the European Parliament with 148,291 votes.

On 1 April 2015, he presented his candidacy to become President of Liguria in the regional election of May at the head of the centre-right coalition composed of Northern League, Brothers of Italy, New Centre-Right and Toti's party FI. After the election, Toti was elected President with 34.4% of votes, defeating the Democratic candidate Raffaella Paita.

On 7 May 2024, Toti was placed under house arrest as part of investigations into corruption, particularly granting favors to local businessmen in Genoa in exchange for financial support in local elections in 2021 and 2022. Toti resigned as governor in July 2024 and was released the following month.
