= Claudio Burlando =

Italian politician (born 1954)

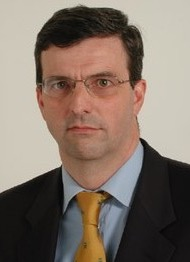

President of Liguria
- In office 14 April 2005 – 11 June 2015
- Preceded by: Sandro Biasotti
- Succeeded by: Giovanni Toti

Minister of Transports
- In office 17 May 1996 – 21 October 1998
- Prime Minister: Romano Prodi
- Preceded by: Giovanni Caravale
- Succeeded by: Tiziano Treu

Mayor of Genoa
- In office 3 December 1992 – 19 May 1993
- Preceded by: Romano Merlo
- Succeeded by: Adriano Sansa

Member of Chamber of Deputies
- In office 9 May 1996 – 29 May 2001
- Constituency: Liguria
- In office 29 May 2001 – 27 May 2006
- Constituency: 9 – Genova, (Liguria)

Personal details
- Born: 27 April 1954 (age 71) Genoa, Italy
- Party: Democratic Party (2007-present)
- Other political affiliations: Italian Communist Party (1974-1991); Democratic Party of the Left (1991-1998); Democrats of the Left (1998-2007)

Claudio Burlando (born 27 April 1954, in Genoa) is an Italian politician, and was President of Liguria, until 31 March 2015. He is a member of the Democratic Party, and a former Democrats of the Left member.

== Career ==
After graduating with a degree in electronic engineering, in the eighties he worked as a researcher for the company Elsag-Bailey. He became interested in politics from a young age, adhering to the Italian Communist Party with which he took his first steps in politics and he held the first public office, becoming secretary of the federation Genoese party from 1989 to 1990.

He later joined the Democratic Party of the Left, with which he was elected to Parliament and has held the position of national coordinator of local authorities (1994-1996) and the Democrats of the Left, of which he was chief economist from 1998 to 2000. With the Communist Party, he became councilor (1981-1993) and Commissioner for Transport (1983-1985). He was deputy mayor of Genoa (1990-1992, during the tenure of Romano Merlo). From 3 December 1992 to 19 May 1993 he was Mayor of Genoa.

In 1996 he was elected Member of the PDS and in the same year, appointed by Romano Prodi as Minister of Transport and Navigation. Two years after, Massimo D'Alema appointed him a member of the budget committee of the Chamber of Deputies.

On 14 October 2007 he was elected to the Constituent National Democratic Party, a political project in which he personally participated since its first design and was a member of the committee that drafted the Manifesto of Values.

Political offices
Preceded by Giovanni Caravale	Minister of Transports; 1996–1998	Succeeded by Tiziano Treu
Preceded by Sandro Biasotti	President of Liguria; 2005–2015	Succeeded by Giovanni Toti
Italian Chamber of Deputies
Preceded by Title jointly held	Member of the Italian Chamber of Deputies; Legislatures: XIII, XIV; 1996–2005	Succeeded by Title jointly held
