= Lunch money =

Lunch money may refer to:

- An allowance, money given by parents to their children for food purchases and other things
- Lunch Money (game), a card game
- Lunch Money (novel), a 2005 novel by Andrew Clements
- "Lunch Money" (song), a hip-hop single

== See also ==
- ExtraLunchMoney.com, a website
- LunchMoney Lewis (Gamal Lewis, born 1988), American rapper, singer, songwriter, and record producer
- Vampires Stole My Lunch Money, an album by artist Mick Farren
