= Gaetano Assanto =

Italian electrotechnician (1958-)

Gaetano Assanto from Roma Tre University, Rome, Italy was named Fellow of the Institute of Electrical and Electronics Engineers (IEEE) in 2013 for contributions to nonlinear optical guides and spatial solitons.
