= Giuseppe Conte =

Prime Minister of Italy from 2018 to 2021

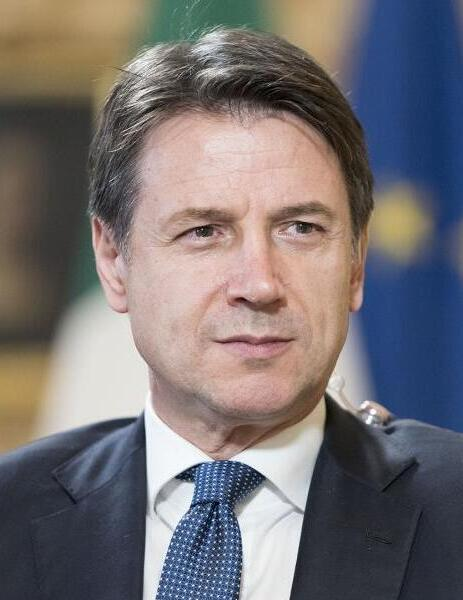
- Conte in 2020

Prime Minister of Italy
- In office 1 June 2018 – 13 February 2021
- President: Sergio Mattarella
- Deputy: Luigi Di Maio; Matteo Salvini
- Preceded by: Paolo Gentiloni
- Succeeded by: Mario Draghi

Leader of the Five Star Movement
- Incumbent
- Assumed office 6 August 2021
- Preceded by: Vito Crimi (acting)

Member of the Chamber of Deputies
- Incumbent
- Assumed office 13 October 2022
- Constituency: Lombardy 1

Personal details
- Born: 8 August 1964 (age 62) Volturara Appula, Italy
- Party: M5S (since 2021)
- Other political affiliations: Independent (before 2021)
- Height: 1.75 m (5 ft 9 in)
- Spouse: Valentina Fico (div.)
- Domestic partner: Olivia Paladino
- Children: 1
- Education: Sapienza University

Giuseppe Conte (Italian pronunciation: [dʒuˈzɛp.pe ˈkonte]; born 8 August 1964) is an Italian jurist, academic, and politician who served as prime minister of Italy from June 2018 to February 2021. He has been the president of the Five Star Movement (M5S) since August 2021.

Conte spent the greater part of his career as a private law professor and was also a member of the Italian Bureau of Administrative Justice from 2013 to 2018. Following the 2018 Italian general election, he was proposed as the independent leader of a coalition government between the M5S and the League, despite him having never held any political position before. After both parties agreed on a programme of government, he was sworn in as prime minister on 1 June by President Sergio Mattarella, appointing the M5S and League leaders as his joint deputies. In August 2019, the League filed a motion of no confidence in the coalition government and Conte offered to resign as prime minister; the M5S and the Democratic Party agreed to form a new government, with Conte remaining at its head. This made Conte the first prime minister to lead two separate Italian governments made up of right-wing and left-wing coalition partners.

Despite having begun his political career as a technocrat, appointed to implement the government programme of M5S and the League, during the final months of his first cabinet and throughout his second one Conte became an increasingly influential and popular figure in Italian politics. During his premiership, he introduced important reforms including the introduction of a guaranteed minimum income, a constitutional reform to reduce the number of parliamentarians, the building incentive measure Superbonus, the nationalizations of ASPI (Italy's highway company), Alitalia (the Italian flag carrier), and Ilva (Italy's largest steel company), as well as a stricter policy towards illegal immigration. In 2020, Italy became one of the countries worst affected by the COVID-19 pandemic. His government was the first in the Western world to implement a national lockdown to stop the spread of the disease. Despite being widely approved by public opinion, the lockdown was also described as the largest suppression of constitutional rights in the history of the Italian Republic, although the Constitution itself authorizes such measures in case of public health concerns. Conte's extensive use of prime ministerial decrees to impose restrictions aimed at containing the pandemic gave rise to criticism from journalists, political analysts, and opposition politicians, even if it was widely appreciated by public opinion, as shown by several opinion polls. The economic impact of the COVID-19 pandemic was especially severe in Italy. In July 2020, to assist with the COVID-19 recession, Conte and other European leaders approved the Next Generation EU package, by which Italy will receive 209 billion euros in grants and loans from the European Recovery Fund.

When Matteo Renzi's Italia Viva withdrew its support for Conte's government, it started the 2021 Italian government crisis in January. Although Conte was able to win confidence votes in Parliament in the subsequent days, he chose to resign after failing to reach an absolute majority in the Senate. When negotiations to form Conte's third cabinet failed, the former president of the European Central Bank, Mario Draghi was asked to form a national unity government.

Conte was the fifth prime minister appointed without prior political experience, after Carlo Azeglio Ciampi, Silvio Berlusconi, Lamberto Dini, and Mario Monti, as well as the first from Southern Italy since Ciriaco De Mita in 1989. Conte was also the longest-serving independent prime minister in the history of Italy, even though he was widely seen as close to the M5S. Because of his leadership style, Conte has often been considered one of the leading examples of techno-populism, while his first cabinet was described by many publications, such as The New York Times and la Repubblica, as the "first modern populist government in Western Europe". Conte has often been called "the people's lawyer" (l'avvocato del popolo), as he described himself during his first speech as prime minister.

== Early life and career ==
Conte was born on 8 August 1964 into a middle-class family at Volturara Appula, near Foggia. His father Nicola was a public employee in the local municipality, while his mother Lillina Roberti was an elementary school teacher.

After his family moved to San Giovanni Rotondo, Conte attended the Classical Lyceum "Pietro Giannone" in San Marco in Lamis and then studied law at the Sapienza University of Rome, where he graduated in 1988, with honours. In 1992, he formally qualified as a lawyer, before, for a short term, studying abroad. In the same year, he moved to the United States to study at Yale Law School and Duquesne University, and at the International Culture Institute in Vienna in 1993. He later researched or lectured at Sorbonne University in 2000, Girton College, Cambridge in 2001 and New York University in 2008.

He began his academic career during the 1990s when he taught at Roma Tre University, at LUMSA University in Rome, at the University of Malta, and at the University of Sassari in Sardinia. Conte is currently professor of private law at the University of Florence and at Rome's LUISS. He sits on the board of trustees of John Cabot University in Rome. Conte's claim to have completed studies at New York University has been questioned, with the institution stating that "A person by this name does not show up in any of our records as either a student or faculty member."

In 2010 and 2011, Conte served on the board of directors of the Italian Space Agency (ASI) and in 2012, he was appointed by the Bank of Italy as a member of the "Banking and Financial Arbitrage" commission. He served also in the scientific committee of the Italian Foundation of Notaries.

On 18 September 2013, he was elected by the Chamber of Deputies as a member of the Bureau of Administrative Justice, the self-governing body of administrative magistrates, on which he also served as vice president.

== Prime Minister of Italy (2018–2021) ==
=== 2018 government formation ===
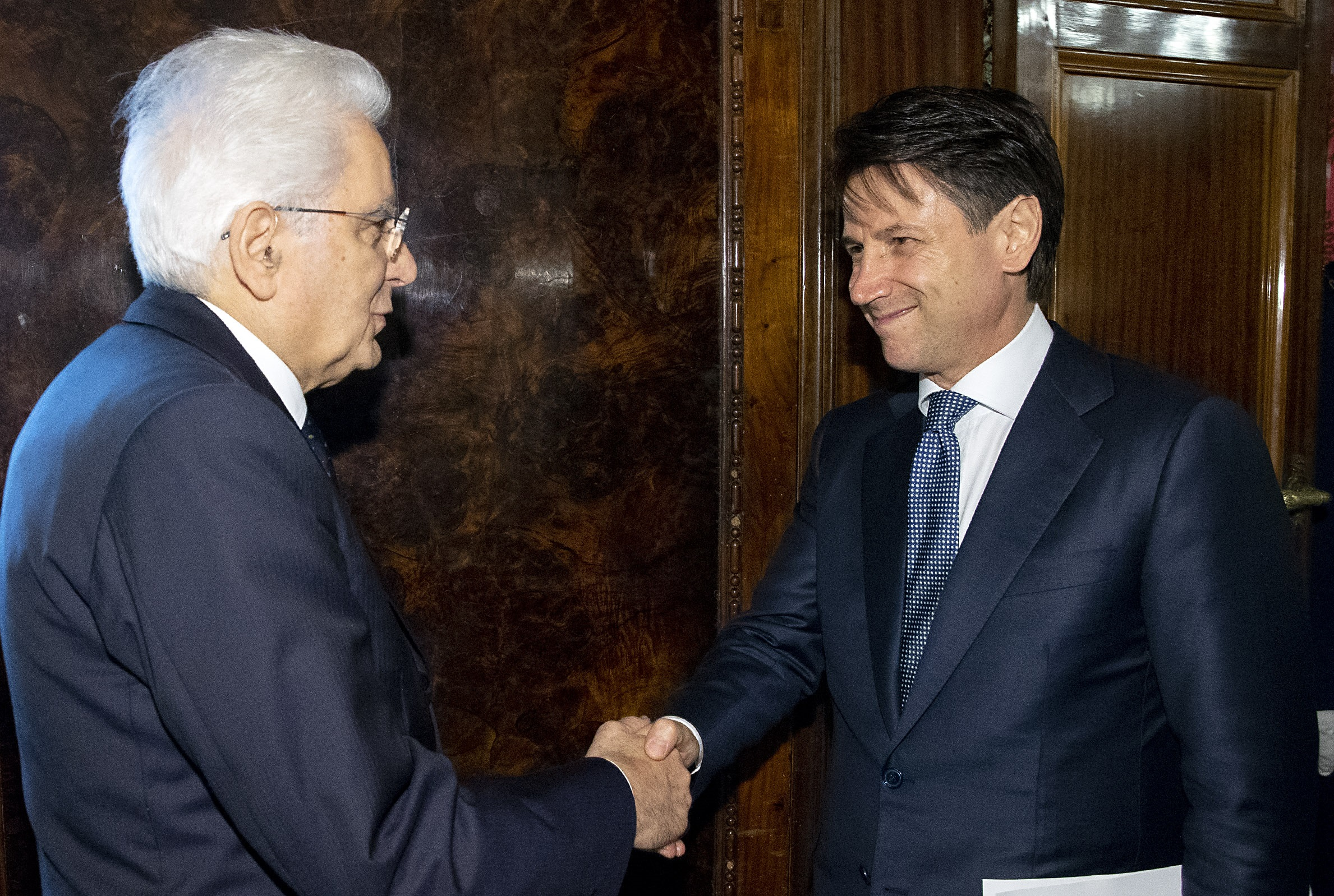
Conte with President Sergio Mattarella at the Quirinal Palace

In February 2018, Conte was suggested by Luigi Di Maio, leader of the Five Star Movement (M5S), as a possible Minister of the Public Administration in his potential cabinet following the 2018 Italian general election; the election resulted in a hung parliament, as M5S became the party with the largest number of votes and of parliamentary seats, while the centre-right coalition, led by Matteo Salvini's League and other right-wing parties, emerged with a plurality of seats, receiving more votes together but without an absolute majority, in the Chamber of Deputies and in the Senate. The centre-left coalition led by former prime minister Matteo Renzi came in third.

On 9 May, following weeks of political deadlock and the failure of various attempts of forming cabinets both between M5S and the centre-right and the Democratic Party (PD), Di Maio and Salvini responded to President Sergio Mattarella's ultimatum to put together a neutral technocratic caretaker-led government by officially requesting that he give them 24 more hours to achieve a governing agreement between their two parties. In the evening of that same day, Silvio Berlusconi publicly announced that Forza Italia would not support a M5S–League government on a vote of confidence, but he would still back the centre-right alliance, thus opening the doors to a possible majority government between the two parties.

On 13 May, M5S and the League reached an agreement in principle on a government programme, possibly clearing the way for the formation of a governing coalition between the two parties, but they could not reach an agreement on the members of a governing cabinet, most importantly, the Prime Minister. M5S and League leaders met with President Sergio Mattarella on 14 May to shape a new government. At their meeting with President Mattarella, both parties asked for an additional week of negotiations to agree a detailed government programme and a prime minister to lead their joint government. Both M5S and the League announced their intention to ask their respective members to vote on the government agreement by the weekend.

On 21 May, Conte was proposed by Di Maio and Salvini for the role of prime minister in the 2018 Italian government, despite reports in the Italian press suggesting that President Mattarella still had significant reservations about the direction of the new government. On 23 May, Conte was invited to the Quirinal Palace to receive the presidential mandate to form a new cabinet. In the traditional statement after the appointment, Conte said that he would be the "defense lawyer of the Italian people".

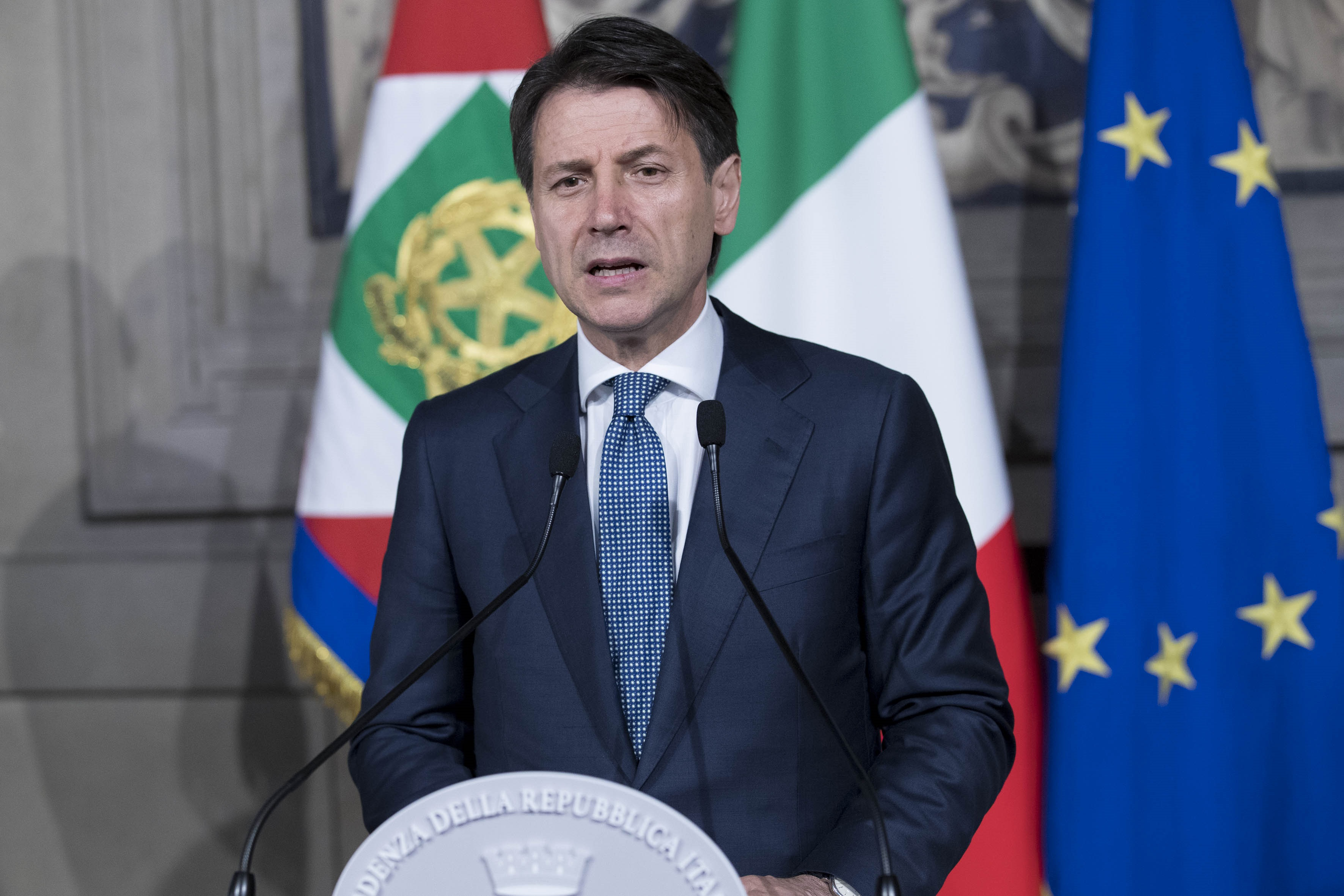
Conte during a press conference at the Quirinal Palace after accepting the task of forming a new cabinet

On 27 May, Conte resigned from his office because of disagreements between Salvini and President Mattarella. Salvini proposed the university professor Paolo Savona as Minister of Economy and Finances, but Mattarella strongly opposed him, considering Savona too Eurosceptic and anti-German. In his speech after Conte's resignation, Mattarella declared that the two parties wanted to bring Italy out of the Eurozone and, as the guarantor of the Italian Constitution and the country's interest and stability, he could not allow this.

On the following day, Mattarella gave Carlo Cottarelli, a former director of the International Monetary Fund, the task of forming a new government. On 28 May, the Democratic Party (PD) announced that it would abstain from a vote of confidence in Cottarelli, while the M5S and the center-right parties Forza Italia (FI), Brothers of Italy (FdI) and the League, said they would vote against him.

Cottarelli was expected to submit his list of ministers for approval to President Mattarella on 29 May. On that and the following day, he held only informal consultations with the President, waiting for the formation of a "political government". Meanwhile, Salvini and Di Maio announced their willingness to restart the negotiations to form a political government and Giorgia Meloni, leader of FdI, gave her support to this initiative. On 31 May, M5S and the League declared they had reached an agreement to form a new government without Savona as finance minister (he would become Minister of European Affairs) and with Conte at its head.

=== First Conte Cabinet ===
On 1 June 2018, Conte officially succeeded the Democrat Paolo Gentiloni as the head of the Italian government and was sworn in as the new prime minister. His cabinet was predominantly composed of members of the M5S and the League, but also of prominent independent technocrats like the Minister of Foreign Affairs Enzo Moavero Milanesi, who previously served as the Minister of European Affairs in the government of Mario Monti, the university professor Giovanni Tria as the minister of economy and finances and economist Paolo Savona, who served in the cabinet of Carlo Azeglio Ciampi in the 1990s and is currently known for his Eurosceptic views, who became the new Minister of European Affairs.

Party leaders Salvini and Di Maio were both appointed Deputy Prime Ministers. While Salvini became Minister of the Interior, with the main aim of drastically reducing the number of illegal immigrants, Di Maio served as Minister of Economic Development, Labour and Social Policies responsible for introducing the universal basic income.

The coalition of the two populist parties which Conte led was also known as the Government of Change, because of a document that summarized the electoral programmes of the two parties, which was called "Contract for the Government of Change".

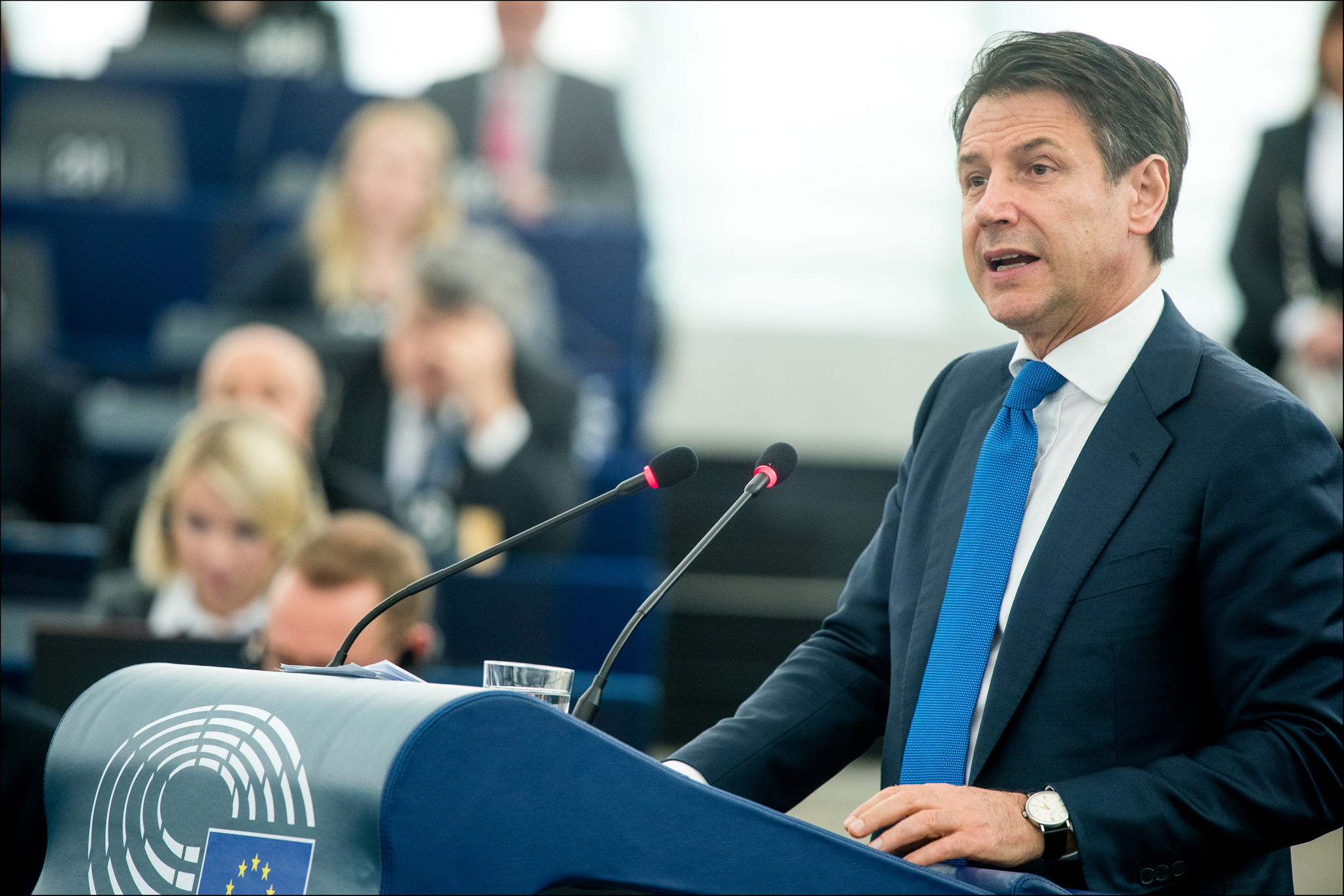
Conte speaks to the European Parliament in February 2019.

During his speech before the investiture vote in the Italian Senate on 5 June, Conte stressed his wish to reduce illegal immigration and increase the pressure on human traffickers and smugglers. He also advocated a fight against political corruption, the introduction of a law which regulates the conflict of interests, a new bill which expands the right of self-defence, a reduction in taxes and a drastic cut in money going to elected politicians and government bureaucrats. Conte also proposed to lift the international sanctions against Russia.

The Senate backed the confidence vote in the Chamber of Deputies, voting 171 in favour and 117 against, with 25 abstentions. The cabinet was supported by M5S, Lega, two senators from Associative Movement Italians Abroad (MAIE) and two independents while the Democratic Party (PD), Forza Italia (FI), Free and Equal (LeU) and other small leftist parties voted against it. The far-right Brothers of Italy (FdI) and another ten independent senators abstained. On the following day, he received 350 votes in favour out of 630 in the Chamber of Deputies, 236 votes against and 35 abstained. As in the Senate, in the Chamber of Deputies PD, FI and LeU voted against the government, while FdI abstained. Besides M5S and League, Conte received two votes from independent deputies and one vote from Vittorio Sgarbi, a notable and controversial member of Forza Italia who has always heavily criticised M5S, but decided to support the cabinet in support of Salvini, and with the hope that an M5S government could lead to the party's failure.

On 5 February 2019, Conte became acting Minister of European Affairs after the resignation of Paolo Savona, who was elected President of the Companies and Exchange Commission (CONSOB). He held the ad interim office until 10 July 2019, when he appointed Lorenzo Fontana as the new minister.

=== Resignation and reappointment ===
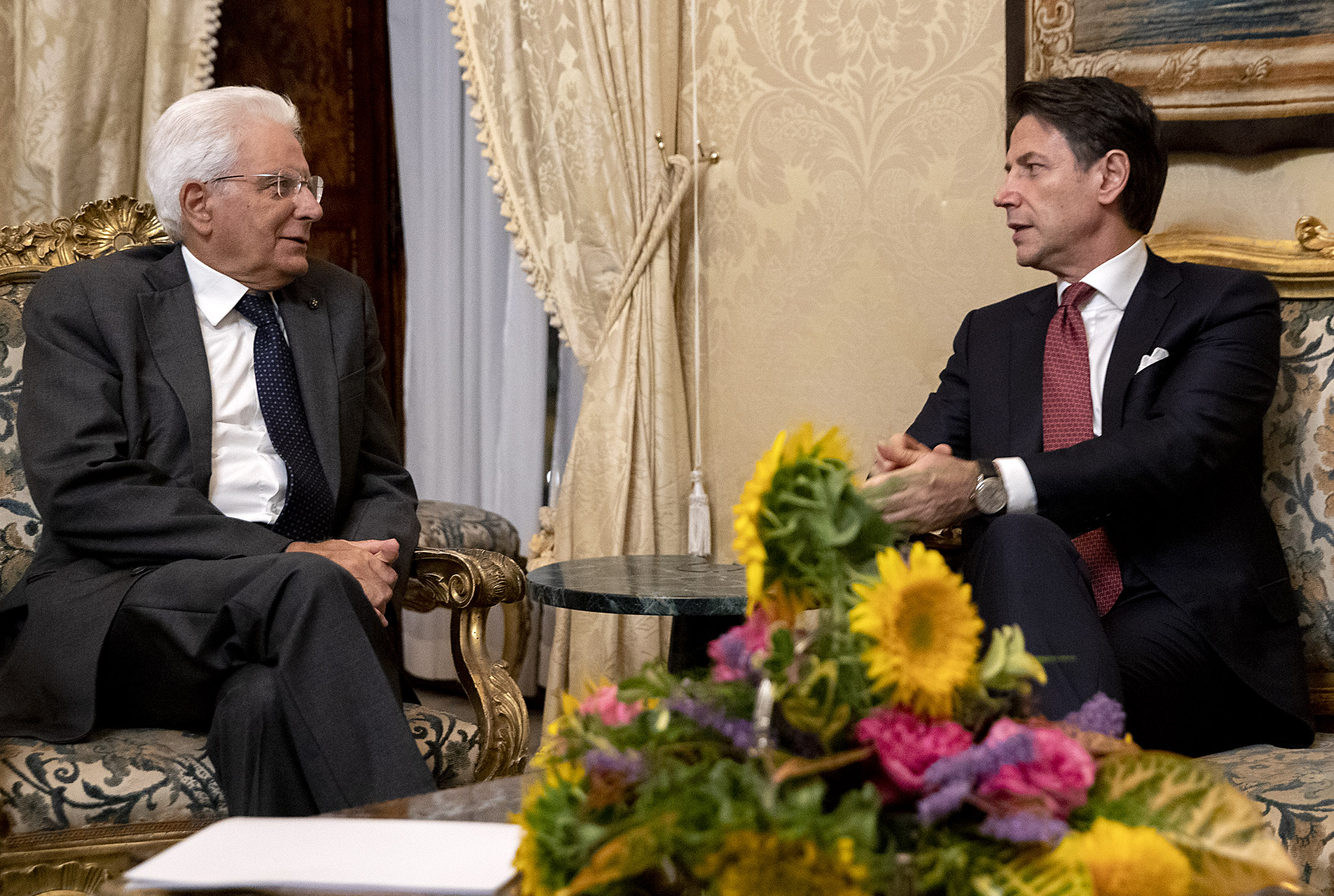
Conte informing President Sergio Mattarella of his resignation

In August 2019, after growing tensions within the majority, Deputy Prime Minister Salvini entered a motion of no confidence against Conte. Many political analysts believe the no-confidence motion was an attempt to force early elections to improve the Lega's standing in Parliament, to enable Salvini to become the next prime minister. On 20 August, following a parliamentary debate in the Senate, in which Conte accused Salvini of being a political opportunist who "had triggered the political crisis only to serve his personal interest", he said: "this government ends here". The Prime Minister resigned his post to President Mattarella.

Subsequently, during a round of consultations between Mattarella and the parliamentary groupings, a possible new majority emerged between the Five Star Movement and the Democratic Party. On 28 August, at the Quirinal Palace, the PD leader Nicola Zingaretti announced his support for keeping Giuseppe Conte as the head of the new government. Mattarella then summoned Conte to the Quirinal Palace on 29 August to ask him to form a new cabinet. On 4 September, Conte announced the ministers of his new cabinet, which was sworn in at the Quirinal Palace the following day. On 9 September 2019, the Chamber of Deputies expressed its confidence in the new government with 343 votes in favour, 263 against and 3 abstentions. On 10 September 2019, in the second vote of confidence in the Senate, 169 voted in favour of the Conte government and 133 against.

On 16 September, a few days from the investiture vote, in an interview with la Repubblica, former prime minister Matteo Renzi announced his intention to leave the PD, launching a new centrist and liberal party named Italia Viva (IV). In the interview he confirmed also the support to Conte's government. Two ministers and one undersecretary followed Renzi to his new movement.

In December 2019, the Minister of Education, Universities and Research Lorenzo Fioramonti resigned after disagreements with the rest of the cabinet over the recently approved 2020 budget bill. Fioramonti considered the share of funds dedicated to education and research to be insufficient. Conte took the ministerial role ad interim, and announced his decision to split the Ministry of Education, University and Research into two: a Ministry of Public Education led by former undersecretary Lucia Azzolina (M5S), and a Ministry of University and Research led by the dean of the University of Naples Federico II Gaetano Manfredi (Independent), who were sworn in on 10 January.

=== 2021 government crisis and resignation ===
Between December 2020 and January 2021, discussions arose within the government coalition between Conte and Matteo Renzi, former prime minister and leader of Italia Viva. Renzi called for radical changes to the government's economic recovery plans after the COVID-19 pandemic, and also demanded that Conte cede his mandate over the secret services coordination task. During his end-of-year press conference, Conte declined Renzi's requests, asserting that he still had a majority in the Parliament.

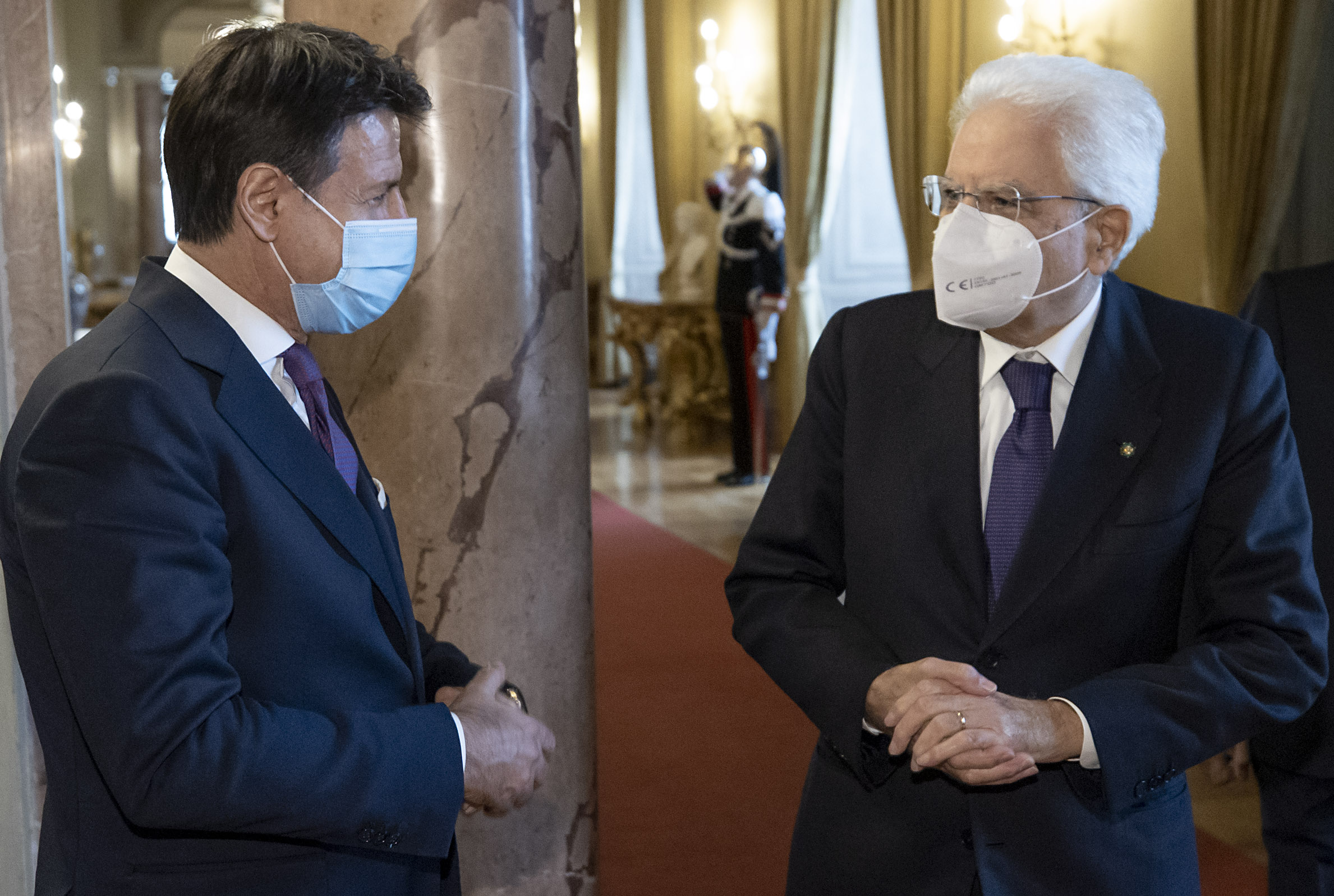
Conte and President Mattarella, a few weeks before the crisis

During a press conference on 13 January, Renzi announced the resignation of IV's two ministers, effectively triggering the collapse of Conte's government. Conte was soon backed by many members of his cabinet, like Dario Franceschini, Luigi Di Maio, Roberto Speranza, Stefano Patuanelli, Alfonso Bonafede, Vincenzo Spadafora and Riccardo Fraccaro. On the following day, Conte took the ad interim roles of Minister of Agriculture and Minister for Family.

On 18 January 2021, the government won the vote of confidence in the Chamber of Deputies with 321 votes in favour, 259 against and 27 abstentions. On the following day, Conte won a vote of confidence in the Senate too, with 156 votes in favor, 140 against and 16 abstentions; however, despite being externally supported by two dissident members of Forza Italia and three senators for life, the government was not able to reach an absolute majority in the upper house. On 26 January, after a few days of inconclusive negotiations with centrist and independent senators, Conte resigned as prime minister. In a statement posted on his Facebook page, he stated: "We have been going through a phase of real emergency. The widespread suffering of citizens, deep social unrest and economic difficulties require a clear perspective and a government that has a wider and more secure majority." The Prime Minister also demanded the formation of a national salvation government.

At the end of the consultations, President Mattarella gave the president of the Chamber Roberto Fico the task of verifying the possibility of a new government with the same majority of the previous one, composed by M5S, PD, IV and LeU. However, on 2 February, Italia Viva broke away from the majority due to disagreements on both platform and cabinet members, leading Fico to head back to Mattarella with a negative outcome. Following the unsuccessful government formation, Mattarella gave Mario Draghi, former president of the European Central Bank, the task of forming a new cabinet. On the following day, Conte met Draghi. On 4 February, during a brief declaration in front of Chigi Palace, Conte officially endorsed Draghi, asking M5S, PD and LeU to support the former ECB President and join his government. Conte also presented himself as a possible leader of the M5S–PD–LeU coalition, which, according to him, must continue to cooperate, even after the end of his government.

== Policies ==
=== Economic policies ===
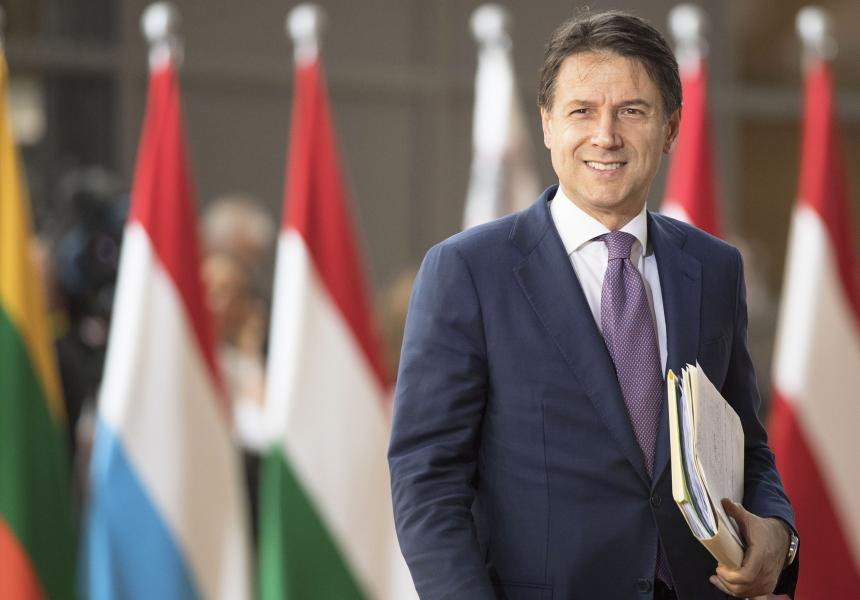
Conte at the European Council

On economic and fiscal issues, one of the main proposals of his first government was a reform of the Italian tax system, with the introduction of a 15% rate flat tax for small entrepreneurs and self-employed with an amount of annual revenues less than €65,000. Though this "flat regime" was a proposal from the right-wing League, it was also confirmed by Conte's second government, which had a centre-left bias.

During his first cabinet, Conte's government rolled out what is known as the citizens' income (Italian: reddito di cittadinanza), a system of social welfare provision that provides a basic income and assistance in finding a job to help poor people and families. The income was set at a maximum of €780 per month, and in its first year the programme had almost 2.7 million applications. The bill was later confirmed by Conte's second cabinet.

In September 2019, at the head of his second government, Conte launched a "Green New Deal", named after the analogous US proposed legislation that aimed to address climate change and economic inequality. In the same period, he praised students who protested against climate change, saying: "The images from the squares during the Fridays for Future are extraordinary, with so many young people participating with such passion. On the part of the government, there is the utmost commitment to translate this request for change into concrete solutions. We all have a great responsibility for this."

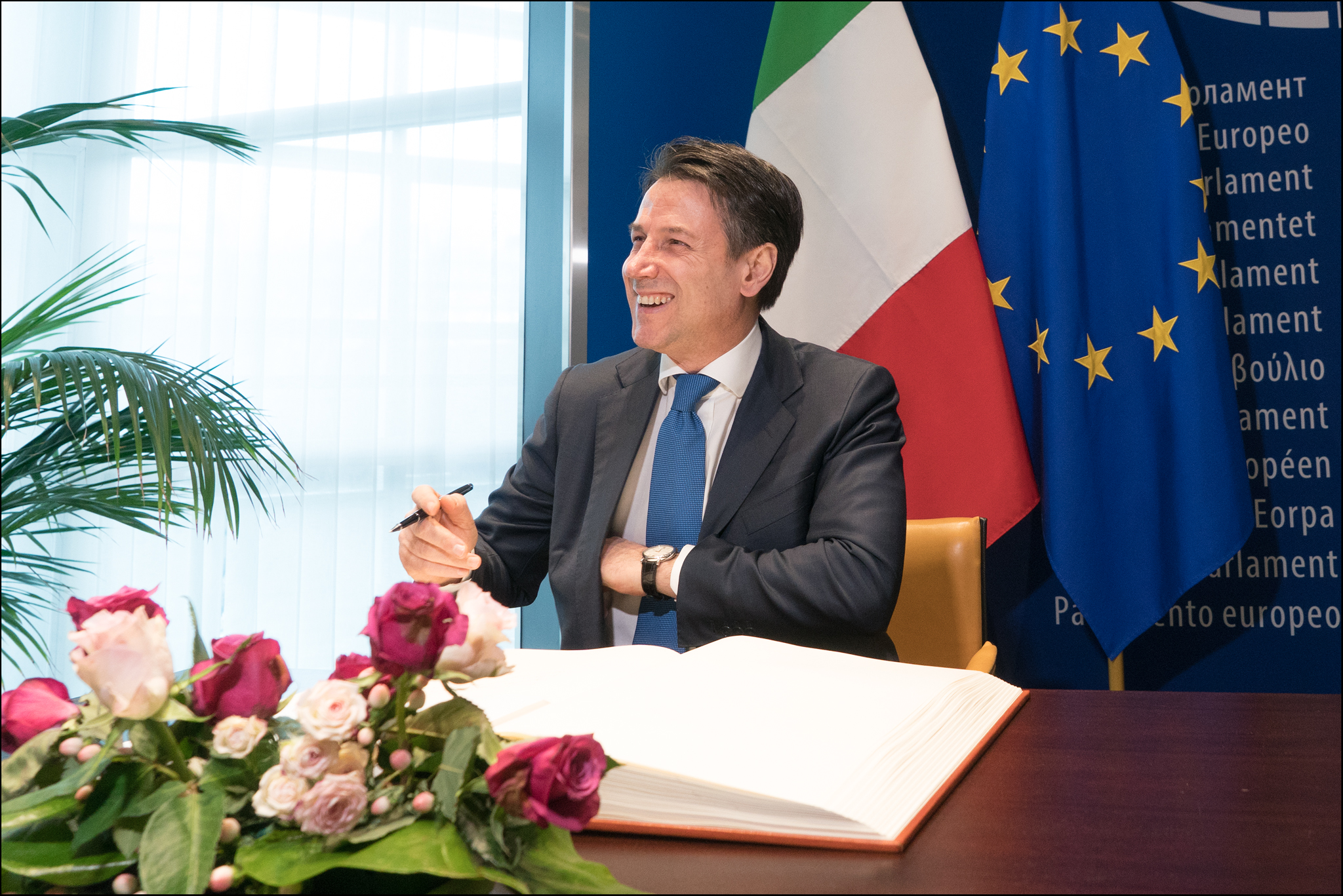
Conte at the European Parliament

In February 2020, Conte appointed Mariana Mazzucato as his economic counsellor. Mazzucato, a professor at University College London, is considered one of the most prominent supporters of state intervensionism.

In April 2020, amid the COVID-19 pandemic in Europe, Conte became the most vocal supporter of issuing Eurobonds to assist with the crisis, describing the European Stability Mechanism (ESM) as "completely inadequate". Conte found key allies in France, Spain, Belgium, Ireland, Portugal, Greece, Slovenia and Luxembourg, which demanded more be done to cope with the COVID-19 pandemic; while Germany, the Netherlands, Austria, Finland and Estonia strongly opposed the eurobonds. Conte, during an interview with German weekly Die Zeit, questioned: "What do we want to do in Europe? Does each member state want to go its own way?", He also added: "If we are a union, now is the time to prove it." On 8 April, he stated "we should loosen the European fiscal rules, otherwise we would have to cancel Europe and everyone will go their own way." On 23 April, the European Council agreed on a ESM without conditionality to sustain direct and indirect healthcare costs and the implementation of the a recovery fund to help with post-COVID reconstruction.

On 13 May, the Council of Ministers approved the so-called "Relaunch decree", with a budget of nearly €55 billion. This decree included "emergency income" for lower-income families, self-employed workers and economics aid to businesses.

From 13 to 21 June 2020, Prime Minister Conte organized a conference called Progettiamo il Rilancio (We Plan the Relaunch), better known as "estates general", in Villa Doria Pamphili in Rome, with the aim of "forging a coherent and well-funded plan for Italy's economic recovery from the coronavirus crisis". The government invited prominent international politicians including Paolo Gentiloni, David Sassoli and Ursula von der Leyen, economists such as Christine Lagarde, Ignazio Visco, Kristalina Georgieva, Olivier Jean Blanchard, Esther Duflo and Tito Boeri, and top managers like Vittorio Colao. The three main trade unions of the country, CGIL, CISL and UIL, and the Italian industrial employers' confederation, Confindustria, also took part in this estates general. The Prime Minister also invited the opposition leaders; however, on 10 June, Matteo Salvini, Giorgia Meloni and Antonio Tajani said they would not take part in the conference.

From 17 to 21 July, Giuseppe Conte took part in one of the longest European Councils in history. After days of harsh confrontations, especially between Conte and Dutch Prime Minister Mark Rutte, the European leaders agreed on a new proposal by the president of the Council, Charles Michel, which provided a budget of €750 billion for the Recovery Fund, composed of €390 billion in grants and €360 billion in loans. Italy would benefit from nearly €82 billion in grants and €127 billion in loans. Prime Minister Conte described the deal as an "historic day for Italy and Europe".

=== Immigration ===
When Conte became prime minister in 2018, he acted quickly to deliver on promises to the government's anti-immigration base through strict controls on immigration to Italy. Since 2013, Italy had absorbed over 700,000 African migrants arriving by boat from Libya. During his premiership, Conte and his Interior Minister Matteo Salvini promoted stricter policies regarding immigration and public security.

After Conte's approval on 10 June 2018, Salvini announced the closure of Italian ports to vessels rescuing immigrants in the Mediterranean Sea. On 24 September 2018, the Council of Ministers approved the "Salvini decree", which contained a series of hardline measures that saw the Italian government abolish key forms of protection for migrants and make it easier for them to be deported. The decree also suspends the refugee application process of those who are considered "socially dangerous" or who have been convicted of a crime. The decree was abolished in December 2020.

On 23 September 2019, Italy and other four European countries, Germany, France, Malta and Finland, agreed on a draft deal to present to other EU countries on how to manage the migrant crisis and distribute those saved from the Mediterranean. This agreement was considered a victory for Conte and his new interior minister, Luciana Lamorgese.

On 8 April 2020, amid the coronavirus pandemic, the government closed all Italian ports until 31 July, stating that they could not ensure the necessary requirements for the classification and definition of "safe place", established by the Hamburg Rules on maritime search and rescue."

=== Ponte Morandi collapse ===
On 14 August 2018, during a torrential rainstorm over the city of Genoa, a 210-metre (690 ft) section of the Ponte Morandi collapsed. Between 30 and 35 cars and three trucks were reported to have fallen from the bridge, with the deaths of 43 people.

The day after the collapse, Conte declared a state of emergency for the Liguria region, which would last for a year. After few days, Conte appointed Marco Bucci, the elected mayor of Genoa, as extraordinary commissioner for bridge reconstruction. In addition, the government put pressure on the managers of the Italian highway company, Autostrade per l’Italia (ASPI), which is part of the Benetton family owned Atlantia. The M5S asked the revocation of license to Benetton family and the nationalization of ASPI. Despite bitter controversies, the revocation was not immediately implemented.

The last two cable-stayed pillars of the bridge were removed through explosive demolition on 28 June 2019. The complete bridge was scheduled to be removed, along with many damaged residential buildings in the surrounding area. The reconstruction of a replacement bridge, designed by famous Italian architect Renzo Piano, began on 25 June 2019 and was completed on 28 April 2020.

On 3 August 2020, the new bridge, named Saint George Bridge, after the patron saint of the Republic of Genoa, was inaugurated by Conte and President Mattarella and opened to motor vehicles after a few days.

==== Nationalization of the highway company ====
In July 2020, Paola De Micheli, the Minister of Infrastructure and Transport, announced that the bridge-operation license would be temporarily assigned to previous operators ASPI. This gave rise to harsh criticism both from the right-wing opposition and the M5S. On 13 July, Conte stepped in to halt any possible prorogation of the license to ASPI, commenting that the company's proposal "was totally unacceptable", and he added: "The members of the Benetton family have not yet understood that this government will not sacrifice the good of the public on the altar of their interests."

On 15 July, the government and Atlantia reached an agreement which brought about the nationalization of the national highway company ASPI, with the state holding a majority participation through Cassa Depositi e Prestiti, while Atlantia would keep only 10% of the company's stock. In a second phase, a listing is planned, aiming to create a company with a widespread shareholder base.

=== Constitutional reform ===
Under Conte's governments, the Italian Parliament approved what is known as the "Fraccaro Reform", from the name of the M5S deputy who was the bill's first signatory. The reform was finally approved by the Parliament, with the fourth and final vote in the Chamber of Deputies on 8 October, with 553 votes in favour and 14 against. In the final vote, the bill was supported both by the majority and the opposition; only the liberal party More Europe (+Eu) and other small groups voted against. The reform called for a cut in the number of MPs, which would shrink from 630 to 400 deputies and from 315 to 200 senators.

After the proposal's approval, Conte said: "The reduction in parliamentarians is a reform that will bring a greater efficiency of parliamentary jobs. Now, citizens will be closer to the institutions. It is a historical passing that, together with other projected reform, will be a prelude to greater efficiency of our parliamentary system."

The referendum to approve the reform was scheduled on 29 March. However it was postponed to 20–21 September due to the coronavirus pandemic which hit Italy hard. In September, Italians largely approved the reform, with nearly 70% voting in favor.

=== COVID-19 pandemic ===
In February 2020, Italy became one of the world's main centres for confirmed cases of COVID-19, a respiratory disease caused by the SARS-CoV-2 virus that was first detected in Wuhan.

In late January, the government banned all flights from and to China, becoming the first European country to adopt this measure. On 22 February, the Council of Ministers announced a bill to contain the COVID-19 outbreak, quarantining more than 50,000 people from 11 different municipalities in Northern Italy. Prime Minister Conte stated: "In the outbreak areas, entry and exit will not be provided. Suspension of work activities and sports events has already been ordered in those areas." After few days, schools and universities closed in the whole country.

On 8 March 2020, Prime Minister Conte extended the quarantine to all of Lombardy and 14 other northern provinces, putting more than a quarter of the national population under lockdown. On the following day, he announced in a press conference that all measures previously applied only in the so-called "red zones" had been extended to the whole country, putting de facto 60 million people in lockdown. He later proceeded to officially sign the executive decree. This measure was described as the largest lockdown in human history.

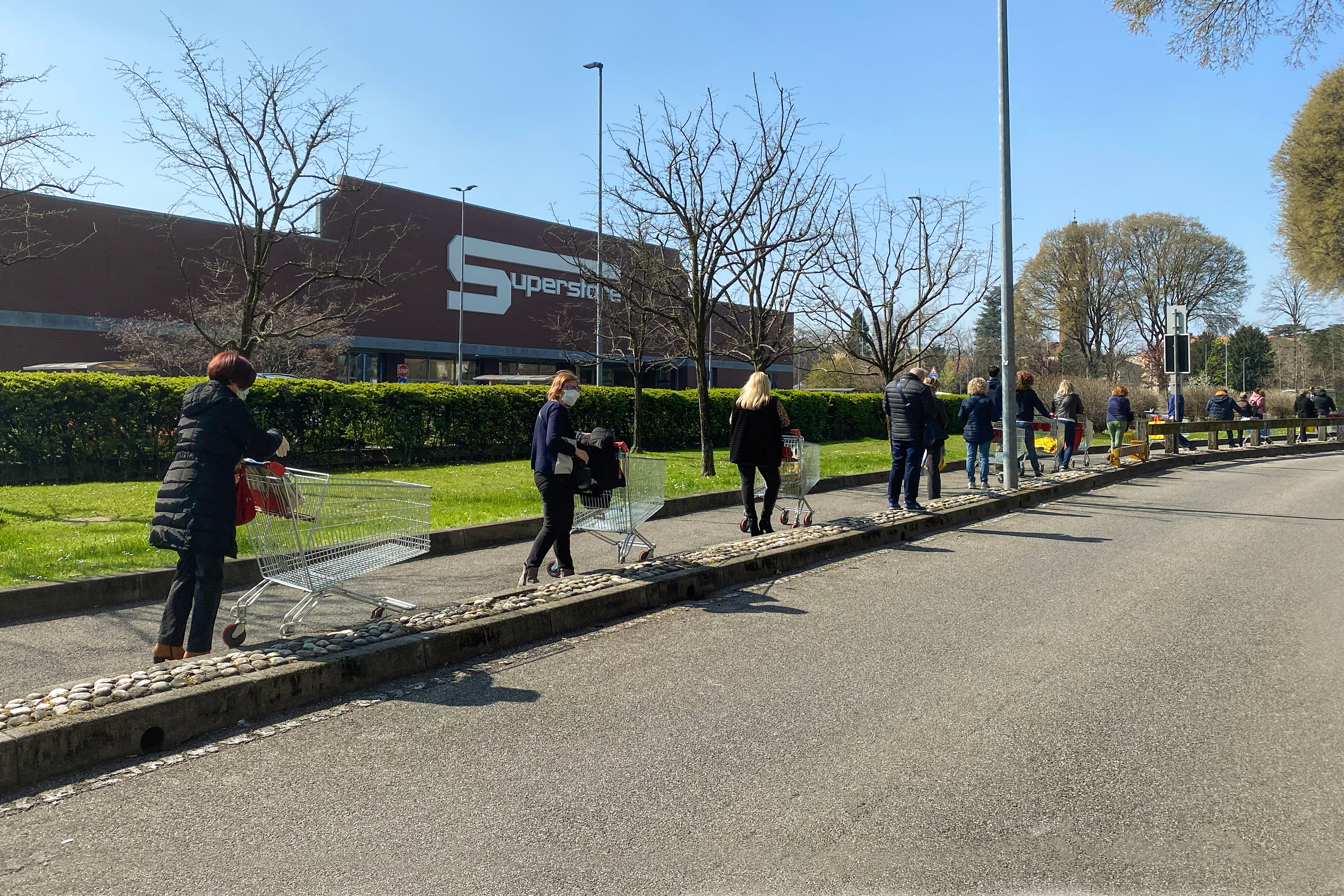
Queue in front of a supermarket after the introduction of social distancing rules in March 2020

The lockdown measures, despite being widely approved by public opinion, were also described as the largest suppression of constitutional rights in the history of the republic. Nevertheless, Article 16 of the Constitution states that travel restrictions may be established by law for reasons of health or security.

On 20 March, the Ministry of Health ordered tighter regulations on free movement. While on the following day, Conte announced further restrictions within the nationwide lockdown, by halting all non-essential production, industries and businesses, following the rise in the number of new cases and deaths in the previous days.

On 24 March, in a live-streamed press conference, Conte announced a new decree approved by the Council of Ministers. The decree imposed higher fines for the violation of the restrictive measures, and a regulation of the relationship between the government and Parliament during the emergency. It also included the possibility of reducing or suspending public and private transport and gave the regional governments the power to impose additional restrictive regulations in their Regions for a maximum of seven days before being confirmed by national decree. On 1 April, Conte's government extended the period of lockdown until 13 April.

On 10 April, Conte made further announcements extending the lockdown until 3 May, allowing some specific businesses, like bookstores and silviculture activities, to reopen under specific safe measures. On the same day, he appointed a task force to relaunch Italy after the crisis; the team was led by Vittorio Colao and composed by a total of nineteen members, chosen among university professors, managers and public administration officers, which notably included Mariana Mazzucato and Enrico Giovannini.

On 26 April, the Prime Minister announced the so-called "Phase 2", which would start from 4 May. Movements across regions were still forbidden, while the ones between municipalities and provinces were allowed only for work and health reasons as well as for visiting relatives. Moreover, he allowed the re-opening of closed factories, but schools, bars, restaurants and barbers were still closed.

On 18 May, the lockdown officially ended and the government allowed the reopening of bars, restaurants, barbers and gyms. However, travels across regions were still limited.

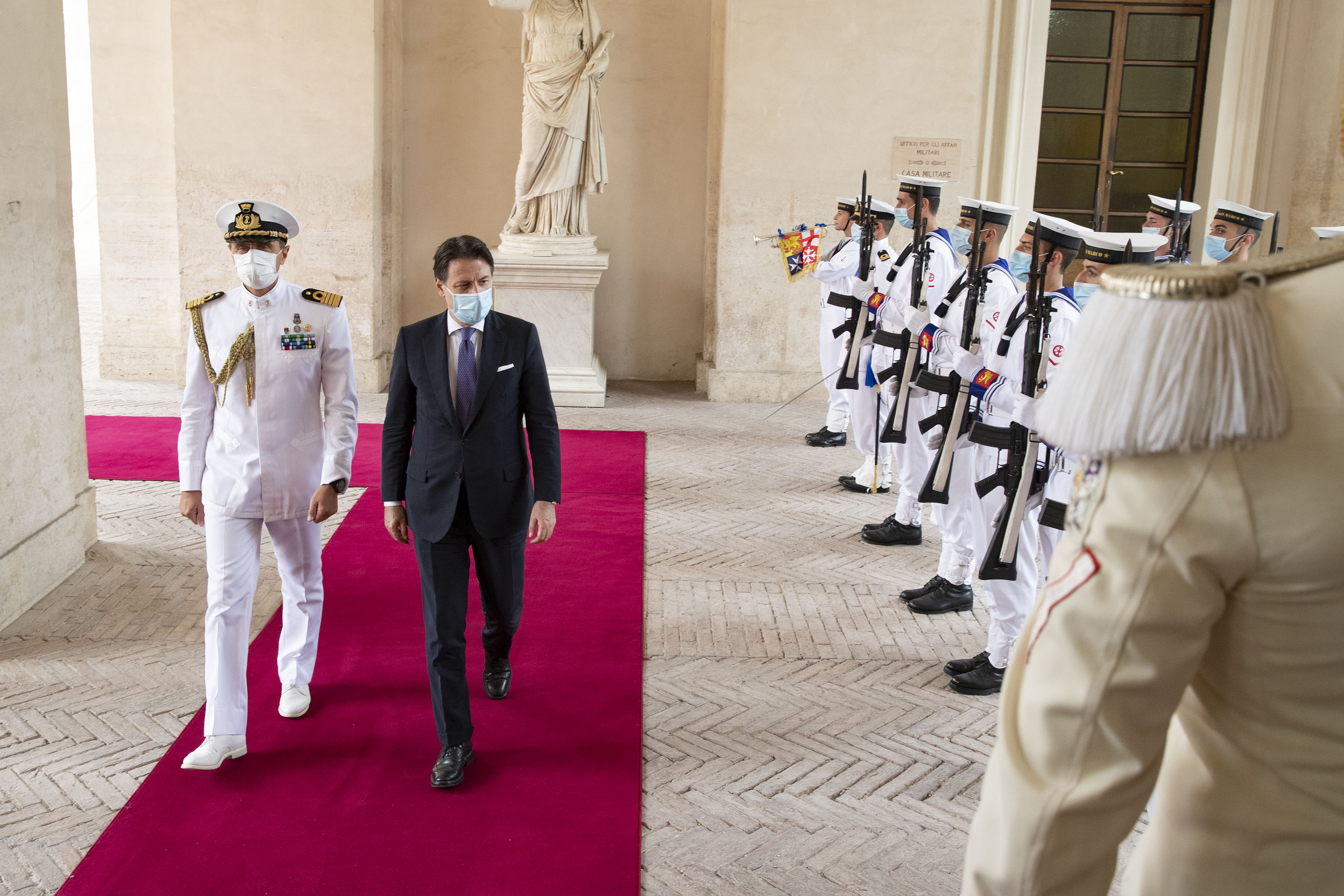
Giuseppe Conte arrives at the Quirinal Palace during the pandemic.

On 28 and 29 July, the Parliament approved the extension of the state of emergency until October 2020, proposed by the government. The state of emergency, which was firstly introduced in January 2020, gave greater powers to the prime minister and the government in facing the crisis. The extension created criticism both from the opposition and the liberal wing of the government. The right-wing leader Giorgia Meloni accused the government of pursuing a "dangerous liberticidal drift", asserting that the emergency was already over. Conte described Meloni's accusations as "dangerous and false", adding that the extension of the emergency was a "legitimate and inevitable measure", which became necessary because "the virus continues to circulate in the country". On 16 August, after an increase in the daily number of new COVID-19 cases, the government closed all the discos and night clubs, and imposed to wear a mask outdoors in some areas considered at risk of crowding.

In October 2020, the confirmed cases continued to grow, reaching the daily record since the beginning of the pandemic. On 7 October, the Parliament postponed the end of the state of emergency to 31 January 2021. On 13 October, the Council of Ministers approved a new decree concerning further restrictions for bars and restaurants as well as the mandatory use of protection mask outdoors. On 18 October, Conte announced further restrictions, including limitations to the opening hours of bars and restaurants, as well as a suspension of amateur contact sports, local festivals and conferences. On 25 October, the government introduced new restrictions, imposing the closing of gyms, swimming pools, theatres and cinemas, as well as the closing of bars and restaurants by 6 pm.

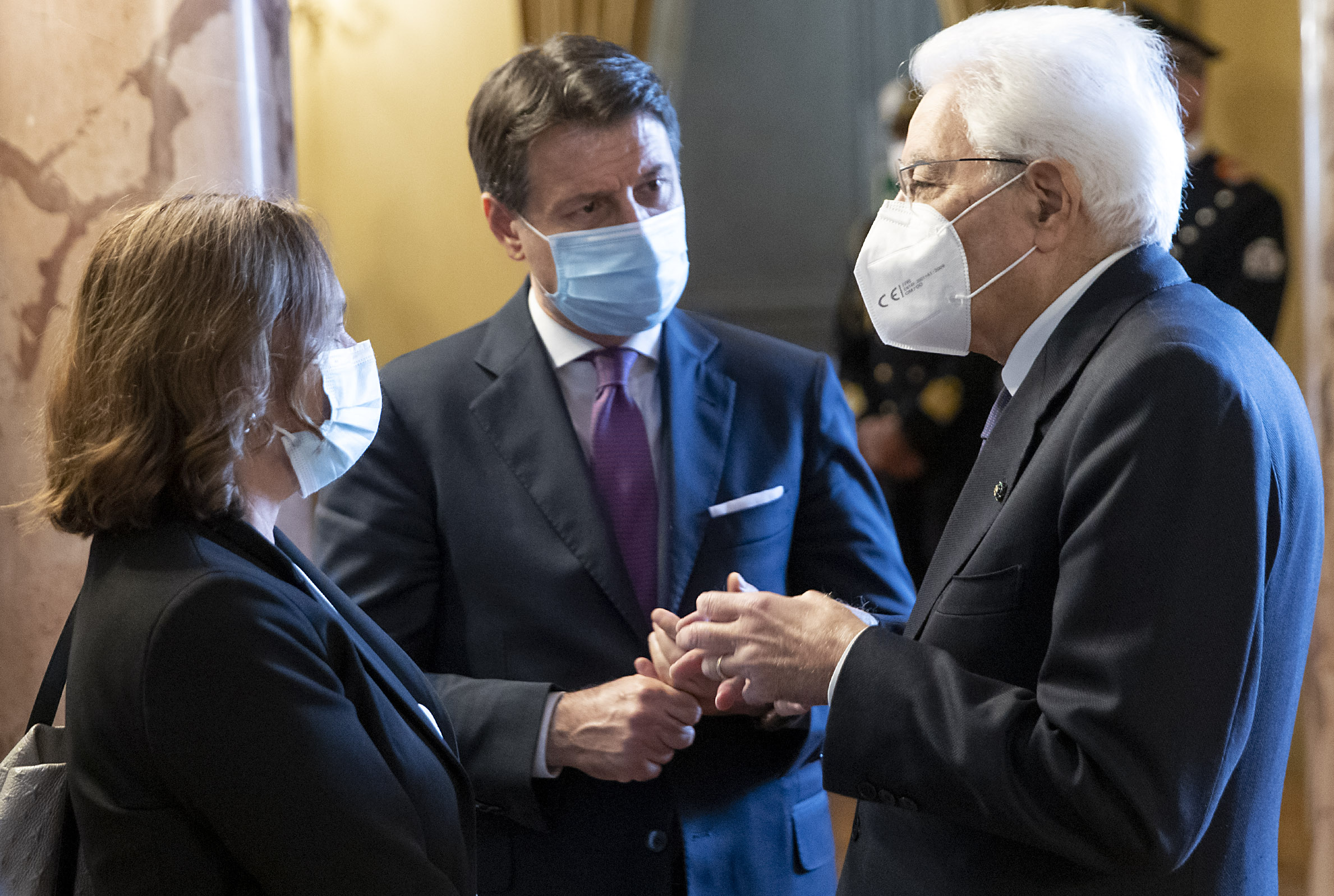
Conte with President Mattarella and Minister Luciana Lamorgese in October 2020

On 4 November 2020, Prime Minister Conte announced a new lockdown, dividing the country into three zones depending on the severity of the pandemic, corresponding to red, orange and yellow zones. Moreover, a national curfew from 10 pm to 5 am was implemented, as well as compulsory weekend closing for shopping malls, and online education in high schools. Conte described the situation as "particularly critical", asserting that the virus was moving at a "strong and even violent" pace. In red zones, lockdown measures were similar to the ones which were implemented from March to May 2020, such as compulsory closing for shops, restaurants and other activities, online education for schools except for kindergartens, elementary schools and sixth-grade classes, and no movements allowed except for working or necessity reasons. In orange zones, restrictions included compulsory closing of restaurants and online education for high schools only, while movement within the home-town territory was still allowed. In yellow zones, the only restrictions included compulsory closing for restaurant and bar activities at 6 pm, and online education for high schools only.

On 2 December, a further movement restriction was implemented by the government to prevent an increase in cases during the Christmas holiday period, forbidding movement between regions from 21 December to 6 January. To prevent people from gathering during Christmas, Saint Stephen's Day and New Year's Day, travel between different comuni was also restricted, and the curfew for New Year's Eve was extended to 7 am. On 18 December, Conte announced that the whole country will be declared "red zone" on Christmas Day and on the other festivities.

=== Foreign policy ===
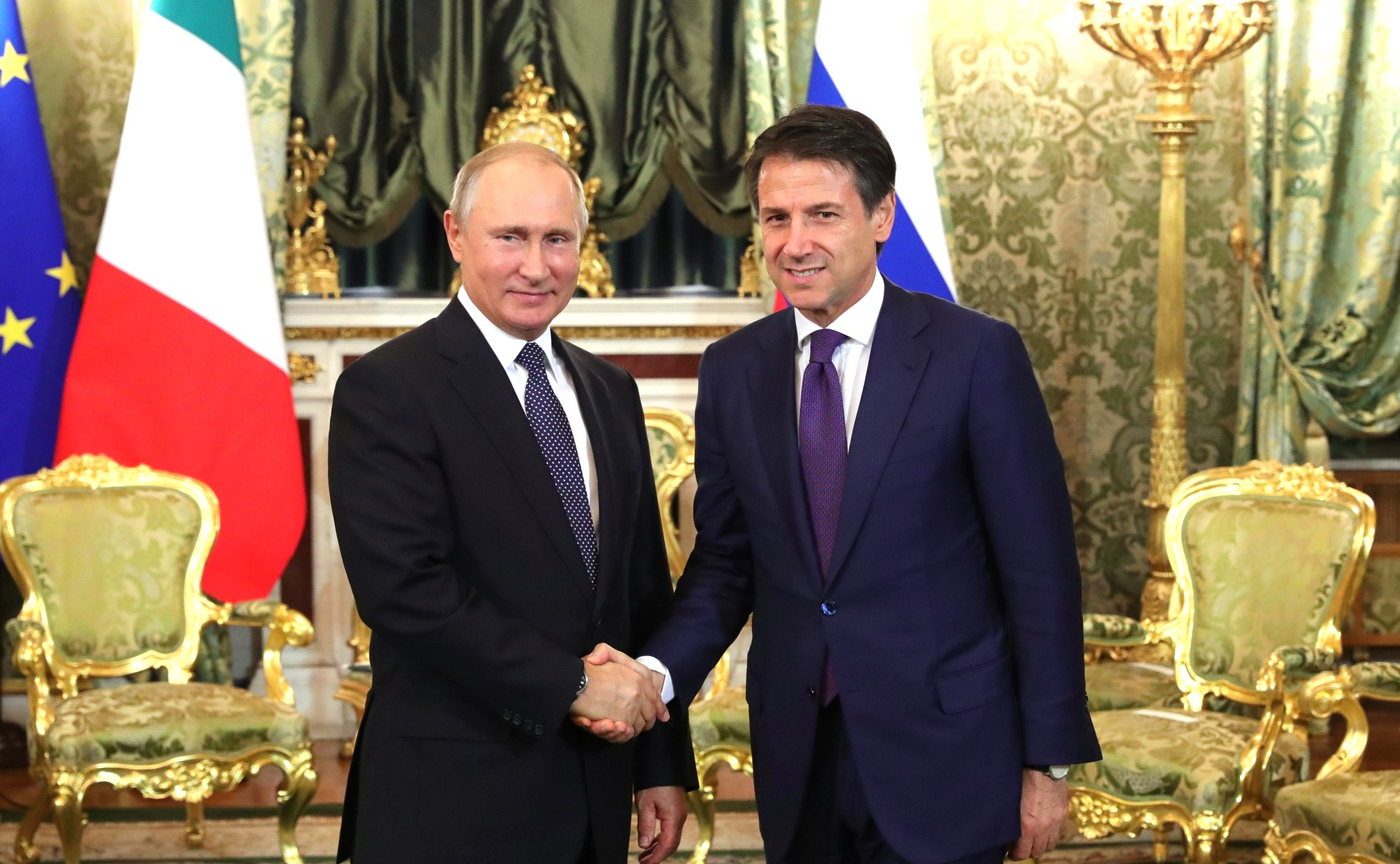
Conte with Russian President Vladimir Putin in October 2018

Since the beginning of his term as prime minister, Conte's foreign policy has been characterized by a lenient approach to Russia. For example, he pressed for the repeal of international sanctions against Russia, which according to him "damage the Italian economy". He also considered Russia a strategic partner in the fight against Islamic terrorism. However, Conte stressed that under his leadership Italy will remain an active member of NATO and a close ally of the United States. During the COVID-19 pandemic in March 2020, after a phone call with Conte, Russian president Vladimir Putin arranged the Russian army to send military medics, special disinfection vehicles and other medical equipment to Italy, which was the European country hardest hit by coronavirus.

During his premiership, Conte built a close relationship with U.S. President Donald Trump. Since the beginning of Conte's government, Trump considered him a key ally during international meetings as well as his "privileged interlocutor" in Europe. On 8 and 9 June, Conte participated in his first G7 summit, hosted by Prime Minister Justin Trudeau in Canada. During the summit, he was the only leader to back President Trump and his proposal to readmit Russia into the G7. However, he later assumed a more pro-European view, shared by the other five leaders, condemning Trump tariffs on steel and aluminium exported by the European Union. On the following day, Conte was thanked for his positions on Russia and his populist stance by President Trump, who invited him to the White House. On 28 June, Conte participated in his first European Council meeting and blocked a joint EU trade and defense statement criticizing Trump's tariff policy.

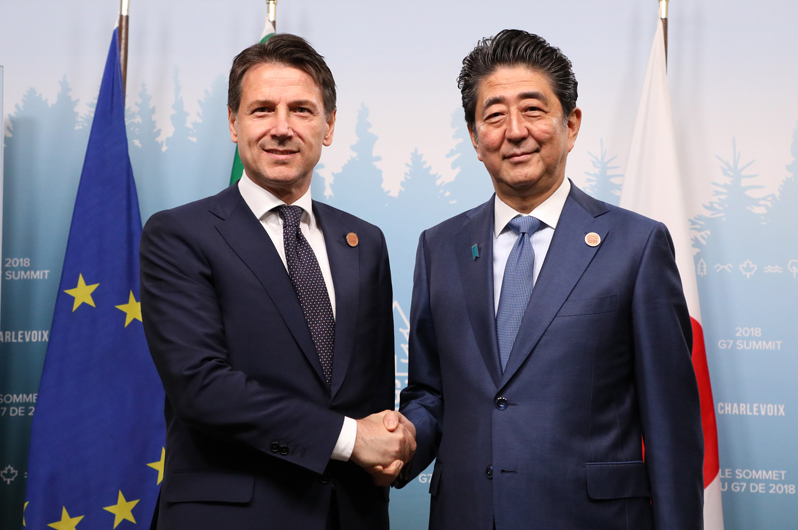
Conte with Japanese Prime Minister Shinzo Abe in June 2018

In June 2018, Trump praised Conte, describing him as a "really great leader" and "very strong on immigration". Trump also endorsed Conte during the 2019 government crisis, hoping that he could remain prime minister. In 2019, Conte authorized the US Attorney General, William Barr, to discuss with the Italian intelligence services about a possible plot against President Trump amid the investigations on the Russian interferences in the 2016 presidential election. This event arose criticism, especially within his own majority coalition, with the Democratic Party and Italia Viva, which asked the Prime Minister to clarify it. Conte stated that the meeting with Barr was "legal and fair", adding that he had never talked about this matter with President Trump.

On 31 March 2020, President Trump announced that the United States would send 100 million dollars of medical aids to Italy, in response to the COVID-19 pandemic which was affecting the country. After few days, during an interview at the NBC, Conte described Trump as "Italy's true and loyal friend". On 11 April, Trump issued an executive order in which he allowed U.S. militaries deployed in Italy to assist Italian law enforcement in facing the crisis.

His close relationship with Trump generated some tensions and journalistic speculations after Trump's defeat to Joe Biden in the November 2020 presidential election. Conte was the last leader of a G7 member to congratulate Biden for his victory; moreover, he was the last leader among the European G7 members to be phone called by the new President-elect. During the call, the two leaders expressed their will to cooperate in major global challenges like the COVID-19 pandemic and climate change.

During his cabinet, Conte built a friendly relationship with the Spanish prime minister Pedro Sánchez. The two leaders organized several bilateral meetings and often shared the same positions during European Council meetings, especially on economics, immigration policies and climate change. Moreover, Conte and Sánchez advocated for anti-austerity measures and for an increase in the European Union's budget. During the COVID-19 pandemic, they were among the main proponents of Next Generation EU. In November 2020, commenting on the relation with his Spanish counterpart, Conte stated: "With my friend Sánchez, we have reaffirmed the alliance between our countries, as well as a common view on the main European and international issues. Together we are a power."

At the beginning of his political career, Conte was described as a populist and Eurosceptic politician, openly critical towards the European Union, whose economic and financial rules were described as "old and outdated"; however, he later toned down his Eurosceptic rhetoric, whilst still remaining a vocal anti-austerity leader, as it became evidence during the COVID-19 pandemic, which severely affected Europe.

In March 2019, Conte and the Chinese President Xi Jinping signed in Rome 29 economic and institutional agreements amounting to 2.5 billion euros, including a memorandum of understanding on the Belt and Road Initiative investments program. Prime Minister Conte's position on the Chinese investments programme was criticized by the other major Western powers.

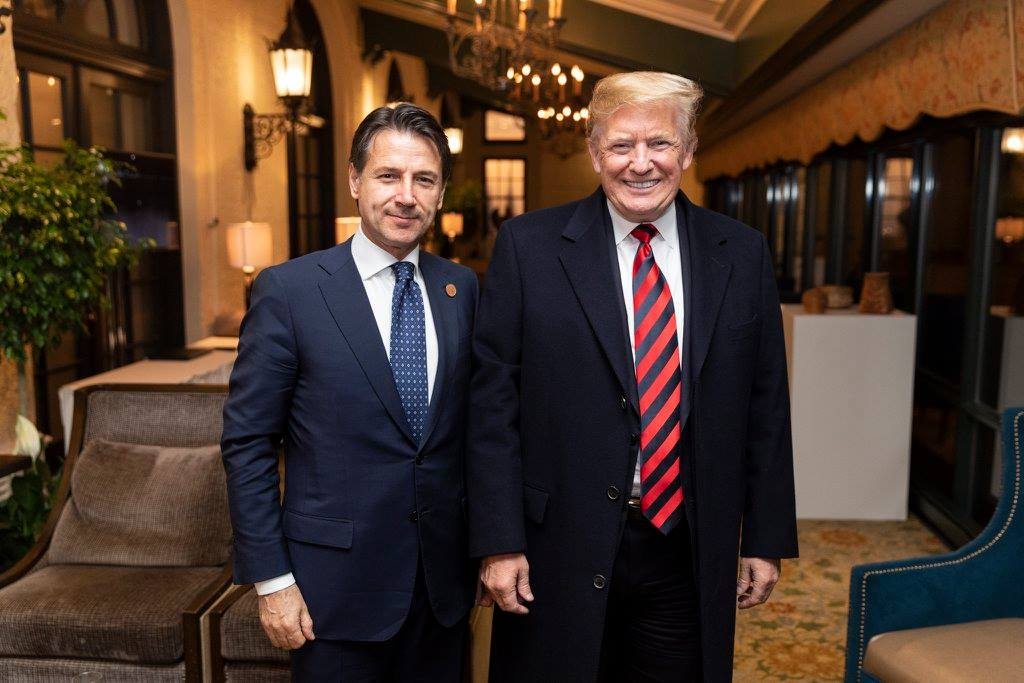
Conte with U.S. President Donald Trump at a G7 event in Canada, December 2019

In August 2019, amid a serious government crisis, Conte took part, as caretaker prime minister, in the 45th G7 summit in Biarritz, in what was believed to be his last summit as head of government. The main topics of the summit included global trade, climate change, taxing technology companies, but also Iran nuclear deal, and 2019 Amazon wildfires.

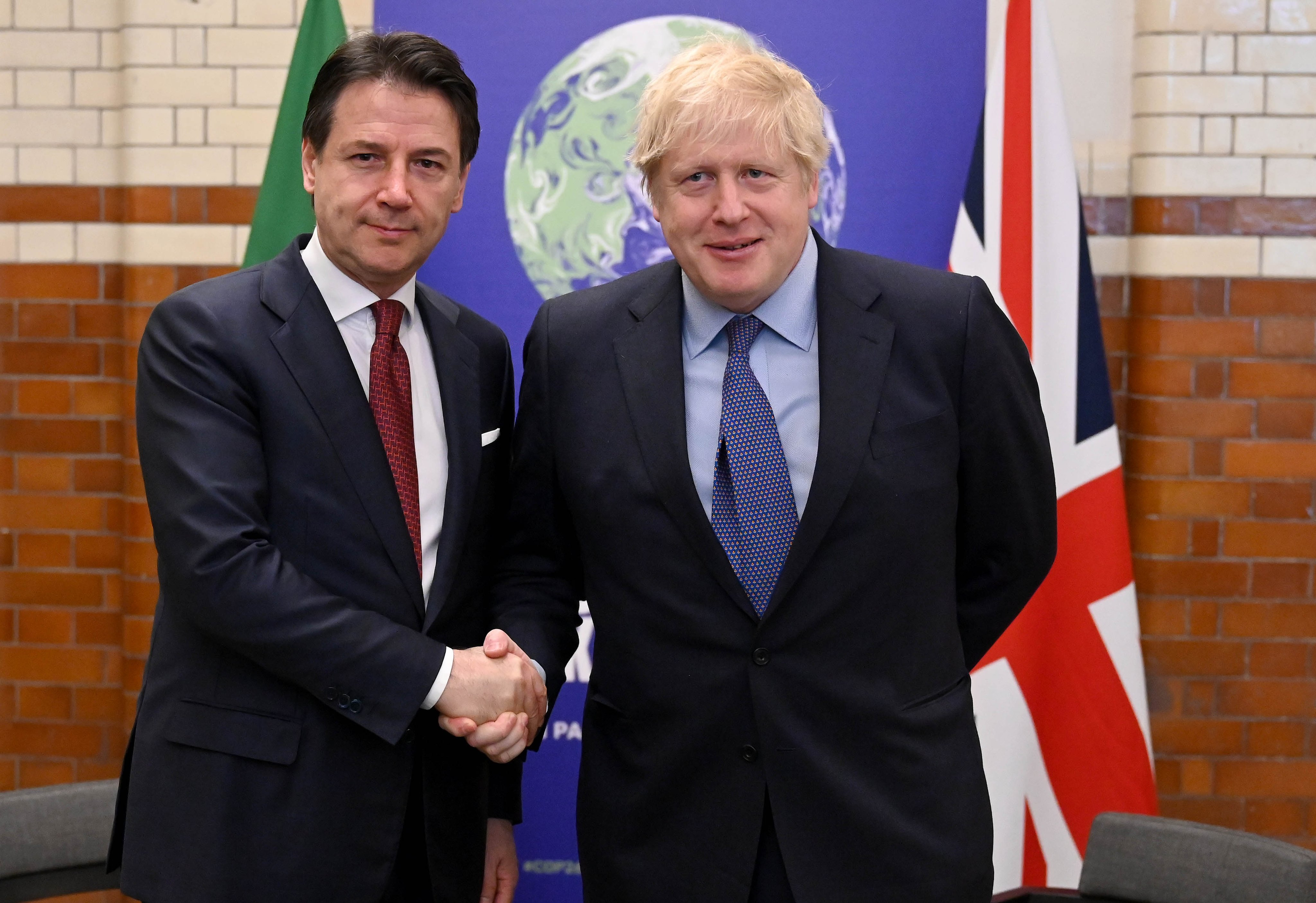
Conte with the British Prime Minister Boris Johnson in 2020

Conte criticized the 2019 Turkish offensive into north-eastern Syria. He stated that the offensive "puts the region's civilians and stability in jeopardy".

In January 2020, the situation of the Libyan Civil War became increasingly worrying, with the troops of field marshal Khalifa Haftar approaching Tripoli. During the crisis, Prime Minister Conte had a series of bilateral meetings in Rome both with Haftar and Fayez al-Sarraj, the chairman of the Presidential Council of Libya, who are considered two of the main contenders in the civil war. After pressures from the international community, on 12 January Haftar announced a ceasefire.

In November 2018, Silvia Romano, a 23-year-old Italian aid worker, was kidnapped in Kenya by a group of terrorists linked to Al-Shabaab. On 9 May 2020, Conte announced her liberation in a tweet. Immediately after the announcement, speculations rose about the ransom paid to the kidnappers, which according to some sources stood at around €4 million. Moreover, Romano became the target of a hate campaign by the right-wing opposition due to her conversion to Islam, occurred during the captivity. During a discussion in the Chamber of Deputies, Alessandro Pagano, a member of the League, called her a "neo-terrorist".

On 1 September 2020, two Italian fishing boats were detained by the Libyan Coast Guard, along with their crews of eighteen members total, while allegedly fishing in Libya's territorial waters in the Southern Mediterranean. Prime Minister Conte asked for the immediately release, but the Libyan commander Khalifa Haftar denied it, demanding a prisoner exchange. On 17 December 2020, Conte announced that the eighteen fishermen were freed.

In November 2020, an investigation conducted by Italian magistrates on the murder of Giulio Regeni, an Italian graduate student who was tortured to death in Egypt in 2016, resulted in the conviction of five agents of the Egyptian National Security Agency. On 21 November, Conte gave a two-weeks ultimatum to Egyptian President Abdel Fattah el-Sisi to cooperate with Italian authorities, stating: "We need answers on Regeni's murder. The time is over." The Prime Minister also threatened to withdraw the ambassador if the Egyptian government will not cooperate. On 11 December, the Italian magistrates officially denounced four Egyptian officers.

== After the premiership (2021–present) ==
=== President of the Five Star Movement ===
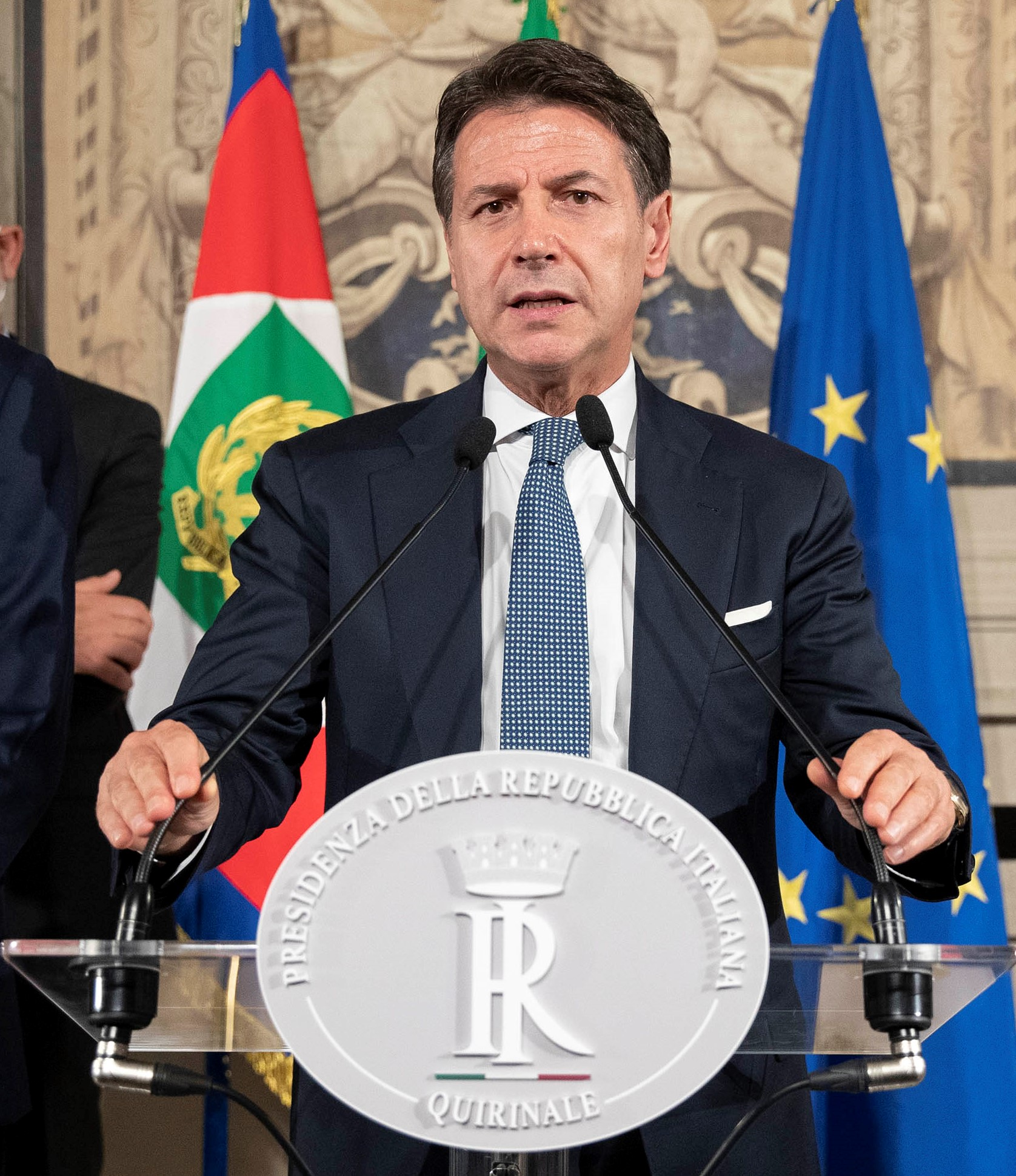
Giuseppe Conte at the Quirinal Palace following the 2022 election

On 28 February 2021, about two weeks after the end of his premiership, Conte joined the Five Star Movement (M5S). In later February, the founder and so-called Guarantor of the M5S, Beppe Grillo, gave Conte the task of writing a new party statute and announced that Conte would become the new political leader. In the following months, however, tensions grew between the two politicians. In June, Grillo accused Conte of aiming at creating a one-man party and of being "without a political vision". The former prime minister threatened to found his own political movement, stating that Grillo "can not stop this useful political project". In July 2021, Conte and Grillo found a compromise on the new statute and leadership elections were called on 5 August. On 4 August, party members largely approved the new statute with 87.6% of votes. On the following day, Conte easily won the election with 92.8% of votes, becoming the party's new president.

In 2022, tensions grew within the M5S between Conte and Luigi Di Maio; the two main representatives of the movement clashed many times regarding the policies promoted by the government as well as in the run-up of the 2022 presidential election, during which Conte briefly supported, along with Salvini, the candidacy of Elisabetta Belloni, opposed by Di Maio. In June 2022, Conte became particularly critical of the government's approach to the Russian invasion of Ukraine and the deployment of military aid to Kyiv's government; on the other hand, Di Maio strongly defended it. Di Maio also labeled the new party's leadership as "immature", while Conte and his closer allies threatened to expel Di Maio from the movement. On 21 June, Di Maio, along with several deputies and senators, exited from the M5S, founding their own political group, known as Together for the Future.

On 13 July 2022, Conte announced that the M5S would revoke its support to the national unity government of Mario Draghi regarding the so-called decreto aiuti, a decree on economic stimulus to contrast the ongoing energy crisis, opening a political crisis within the majority. On the following day, the M5S abstained, not voting the confidence vote to the government, and Draghi, despite having largely won the vote, officially resigned as prime minister; however, the resignation was rejected by president Sergio Mattarella. On 21 July, Draghi resigned again after a new confidence vote in the Senate failed to pass with an absolute majority, following the defections of M5S, Lega, and Forza Italia; President Mattarella accepted Draghi's resignation and asked Draghi to remain in place to handle current affairs. A snap election was called for 25 September 2022.

In the election, Conte's M5S ran alone and gained 15.4% of the votes, being the third most-voted party. However, it was able to elect only 52 deputies and 28 senators. Conte was elected to the Chamber of Deputies for the multi-member constituency of Lombardy 1.

== Political views and public image ==
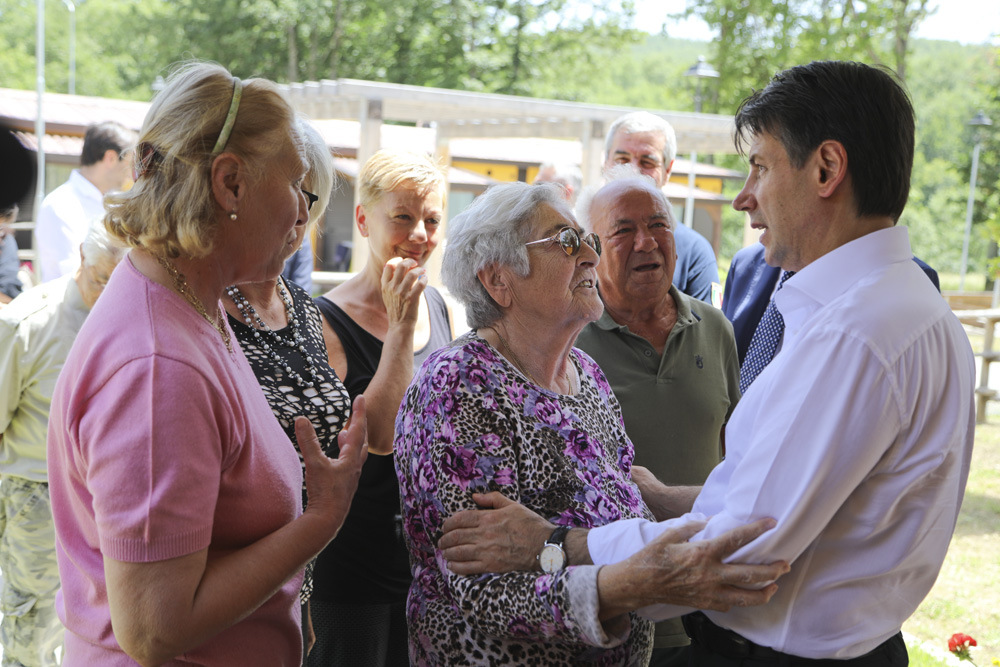
Conte among people affected by the 2016 Central Italy earthquakes

Conte has been described by journalists and political analysts as a populist politician. His leadership style has been considered one of the most prominent examples of the so-called techno-populism. During his first cabinet, Conte has often been labeled as a neo-nationalist leader; since September 2019, when he became the head of a centre-left coalition government, he slightly toned down his nationalist rhetoric, while he continued to use various instances of the so-called banal nationalism. Despite being labeled as a post-ideological leader, who governed both with the political right and the political left, Conte described his political ideal as "new humanism". In September 2019, he described himself as a leftist within the Christian-democratic tradition.

During an interview in 2018, Conte said he used to vote for the centre-left coalition (The Olive Tree) and once for a centrist party but never for Forza Italia or National Alliance, and then the Democratic Party until 2013, when he began approaching the M5S. He also added that "the ideological schemes of the 20th century are no longer adequate to represent the current political system" and it should be "more important and correct to evaluate the work of a political force on how it is positioned on the respect of fundamental rights and freedoms".

In his inaugural speech at the Senate of the Republic on 5 June 2018, in response to attacks on government political forces accused of being populist and anti-establishment, Conte replied that "if populism is the attitude of the ruling class to listen to the people's needs ... and if anti-establishment means aiming at introducing a new system able to remove old privileges and encrusted power, well, these political forces deserve both these epithets".

Conte opposed the "hypertrophy of Italian laws", advocating the repeal of useless laws and supported a simplification of bureaucracy. As a professor, he strongly opposed the school reform legislation promoted by Matteo Renzi's government in 2015, known as "The Good School", which, according to him, must be completely revised. Contrasts with Renzi became evident during Conte's second government. Despite the cabinet being supported by Renzi's Italia Viva, among others, the former prime minister has often accused Conte of being a populist politician, threatening to withdraw his party's support.

According to public opinion surveys, Conte's approval rating was always above 50% during his first cabinet, then it dropped to 40% in the early months of his second government. In March 2020, amid the COVID-19 crisis, his approval rating rose above 70%, one of the highest ever ratings for an Italian prime minister. In January 2021, 56% of Italians wanted Conte to remain as prime minister. According to Ipsos, Conte's approval rating at the end of his second government in February 2021 was still around 65%. Moreover, with more than 4.4 million followers, Conte is one of the most followed European leaders on Facebook.

== Personal life ==
Conte married Valentina Fico, a lawyer from Rome and daughter of a former director of the Conservatorio Santa Cecilia, with whom he has a son, Niccolò (b. 2007); they divorced after a few years. By 2018, Conte was engaged to Olivia Paladino, daughter of Roman entrepreneur Césare Paladino and Swedish actress Ewa Aulin.

Conte is an avid supporter of A.S. Roma, a passion that arose while he studied at Sapienza University of Rome. He is a practising Roman Catholic and a known devotee of Saint Pio of Pietralcina. Conte is bilingual in Italian and English.

== Controversies ==
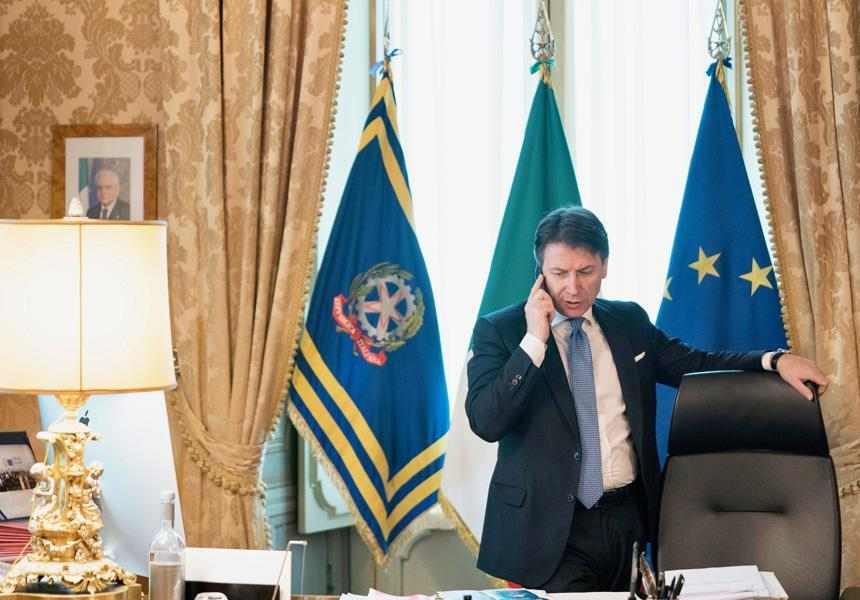
Conte in the Prime Minister's office, 2020

On 21 May 2018, when Conte was proposed to President Mattarella as a candidate for prime minister, The New York Times questioned his summer stays at New York University (NYU) listed in his official curriculum vitae in an article asserting that a NYU spokeswoman could not find Conte in university "records as either a student or faculty member". Similar doubts arose concerning his study period in France at the Sorbonne University.

The following day, the Associated Press reported in an article published also by The New York Times that the NYU spokeswoman added that "while Mr. Conte had no official status at NYU, he was granted permission to conduct research in the NYU Law library" during the period listed in his official curriculum vitae. Similarly, the Duquesne University of Pittsburgh and the University of Malta found no record of him in their archives, although it was confirmed that Conte held lectures at the old university building in Valletta, Malta, for the Foundation for International Studies. Yale University, contacted by another newspaper, confirmed that he was a visiting scholar there for three months.

Moreover, Conte stated in his CV that he had worked on his legal studies at the Kulturinstitut in Vienna, Austria, but this is a language school, not a law school.

In June 2020, then Prime Minister Conte approved the sale of two military ships to Egypt. This move was heavily criticised both by opposition and government allies, due to the ongoing tensions between Italy and Egypt, following the murder of Giulio Regeni, an Italian PhD student tortured to death in 2016.

== Electoral history ==
Election	House	Constituency	Party	Votes	Result
2022	Chamber of Deputies	Lombardy 1	M5S	– (Note: Elected in a closed list proportional representation system.)	Elected

== Authored books ==
- with Landini Sara (1996). Il volontariato. Libertà dei privati e mediazione giuridica dello Stato. Rome: Pioda. ISBN 978-88-99459-77-2.
- Matrimonio civile e teoria della simulazione. Rome: Pioda. 1996. OCLC 1088868085.
- La simulazione del matrimonio nella teoria del negozio giuridico. Padua: CEDAM. 1999. ISBN 978-88-13-22006-8.
- Le regole della solidarità. Iniziative non-profit dei privati e mediazione dei pubblici poteri. Rome: Pioda. 2001.
- La responsabilità sociale dell'impresa. Tra diritto, etica ed economia. Bari: Laterza. 2008. ISBN 978-88-420-8592-8.
- with Vigoriti Vincenzo (2010). Futuro giustizia azione collettiva mediazione. Turin: Giappicelli. ISBN 978-88-348-9840-6.
- Il danno non-patrimoniale. Milan: Giuffrè. 2018.
- La formazione del contratto. Milan: Giuffrè. 2018. ISBN 978-88-14-20377-0.
- L'impresa responsabile. Milan: Giuffrè. 2018. ISBN 978-88-14-22703-5.

Political offices
Preceded by Paolo Gentiloni	Prime Minister of Italy; 2018–2021	Succeeded by Mario Draghi
Party political offices
Preceded by Vito Crimi; Acting	President of the Five Star Movement; 2021–present	Incumbent
