= List of leaders of the Five Star Movement =

The leader of the Five Star Movement is the de facto and/or de jure leader and guide of the M5S, a political party in Italy, founded in October 2009 by Beppe Grillo and Gianroberto Casaleggio.

== List ==
Name (Born–Died)		Term of office	Election	Notes
President
1	Beppe Grillo (born 1948)	4 October 2009 – 23 September 2017 (7 years, 354 days)	None	Founder and de facto leader until 2017, when he resigned becoming movement's guarantor.
Political Leader
2	Luigi Di Maio (born 1986)	23 September 2017 – 22 January 2020 (2 years, 121 days)	2017	Elected political head of the movement and candidate for the premiership in the 2018 general election.
–	Vito Crimi (born 1972)	22 January 2020 – 6 August 2021 (1 year, 196 days)	None	Appointed acting leader, following the resignation of Luigi Di Maio.
President
3	Giuseppe Conte (born 1964)	6 August 2021 – Incumbent (4 years, 82 days)	2021; 2025	Elected president of the movement.
