= Raffaele Monti (filmmaker) =

Italian film director

Raffaele Monti (Eboli, Italy, February 15, 1981) is an Italian director, screenwriter, actor, independent producer and cinema and TV critic.

== Short movies production ==
Graduated in TV and cinema at the Roma Tre University with maximum grades, Raffaele Monti wrote, produced, directed and played his first short movie, On the life (Sulla vita), as his thesis in 2004. In the same year, On the life was presented at the Arcipelago International Film Festival in the section "Special Events". Just a 24-year-old, he won the prestigious Premio Internazionale Roberto Rossellini ex-aequo with the Chilean director Liu Marino, readapting William Shakespeare’s Romeo and Juliet in his screenplay of short film A bench, a meeting, the love (Una panchina, un incontro, l’amore). The movie also attended the Rome International Film Festival (RIFF) and the Reggio Film Festival. In 2007 he took part in the 48 Hour Film Project with the short Satisfaction (I can get), written, co-produced – with the fantasy name Meafaocort Express – and co-directed together with Gianpaolo Bucci. It won the "Best Actor" award (Daniele Favilli) and was selected among the top five by the organizers. In 2008, Satisfaction (I can get) won the People's Choice Award at the Corti e Liberi Novara. Afterwards, Satisfaction (I can get) took part in the Arcipelago International Film Festival 2009 and was broadcast in very short clips on Babelgum.

Between 2009 and 2010, Raffaele Monti toured Italy as a production manager for the play "Mamma Napoli" by Emiliano De Martino. In 2012 he wrote, co-produced and directed with his colleague Gianpaolo Bucci the short movie Young Hunger (La fame giovane), premiered out of competition at the MED Film Festival of Rome.

== TV pilot production ==
Raffaele Monti wrote, self-produced, directed and starred the TV pilot of the sitcom A Ghost Tenant (Un fantasma per coinquilino), winner of the Italian Festival del cinema indipendente as Best TV Pilot with the following motivation:

For the characterization, for added flexibility in the schedule, for the elasticity of production and a strong identification of the target audience.

The pilot also received a Special Mention in 2013 at the Festival della Creatività di Roma Capitale with the following motivation:

A zero budget sit-com but with creativity to one hundred. Pleasant, funny, full of visual ideas and strong kinesic intuitions (…) with the lost and disoriented mask played by Raffaele Monti – almost a Jacques Jacques Tati of the twenty-first century – at the lead (...)

In 2013, Raffaele Monti and Mobcaster, a US website for crowdfunded television-shows, try crowdfunding as a financial tool to produce the entire Season 1 of "A Ghost Tenant".

== Experience as a critic ==
Raffaele Monti started his career as a critic in 2002, writing for the magazine Rivista Omnibus. His career as a critic became significant from the following year (and until 2010), when he started a stable collaboration with the website CinemAvvenire, for whom he wrote about cinema, TV, music and literature. During this period, he worked as a correspondent in a lot of prestigious film festivals, like Asiatica Film Mediale, MED Film Festival, Giffoni Film Festival, Venice Film Festival and Torino Film Festival. In 2005 he was a correspondent for UniversyTV, of Roma Tre University, at the Venice Film Festival. In 2006 he participated as a main character at the TV show Voglia!, on national channel Italia 1, and lately he harshly criticized the show on CinemAvvenire website. In 2008 he also was a film critic for MoviePlayer. Passionate about soccer, he wrote about SSC Napoli, his favorite team soccer, on Vavel in 2011.

== Other works ==
In 2004, Raffaele Monti starred in the short movie The trap (La trappola) directed by Francesco del Grosso.

== Filmography ==
- On the Life (Sulla vita, 2004), short movie
- Romeo and Juliet by Raffaele Monti/A bench, a meeting, the love (Una panchina, un incontro, l’amore, 2005), short movie
- Satisfaction (I can get), 2007, co-directed by Gianpaolo Bucci, short movie
- Young Hunger (La fame giovane, 2012), co-directed by Gianpaolo Bucci, short movie
- A Ghost Tenant (Un fantasma per coinquilino, 2013), TV Pilot
