= 2021 Five Star Movement leadership election =

Italian political party leadership election

- 6 August 2021
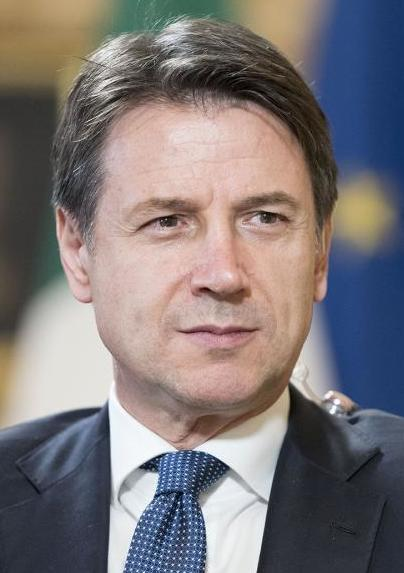
Nominee	Giuseppe Conte
Party	Five Star Movement
Popular vote	62,242
Percentage	92.8%
Leader before election
Vito Crimi
(Acting)
Elected leader
Giuseppe Conte

The 2021 Five Star Movement leadership election was an Italian online primary election held on 6 August 2021 that determined the president of the M5S. The election was de facto a plebiscite in which party's members were asked to approve or reject the candidacy of former prime minister Giuseppe Conte as new leader. Conte easily won the election with 92.8% of votes.

== Background ==
In February 2021, Prime Minister Giuseppe Conte was forced to resign, after losing the absolute majority in the Senate of the Republic. On 28 February 2021, after a few days from the end of his premiership, Conte joined the Five Star Movement (M5S), the party which proposed his candidacy as Prime Minister in June 2018.

After a few days, the founder and so-called Guarantor of the M5S, Beppe Grillo, gave Conte the task of writing a new party's statute and announced that Conte would become the new political leader. In the following months, however, tensions grown up between the two politicians. In June, Grillo accused Conte of aiming at creating a one-man party and of being "without a political vision". The former Prime Minister threatened to found his own political movement, stating that Grillo "can not stop this useful political project". In July 2021, Conte and Grillo found a compromise on the new statute and leadership elections were called on 6 August.

== Candidates ==
Portrait	Name	Most recent position	Refs
	Giuseppe Conte (1964– )	Prime Minister of Italy (2018–2021)	

== Results ==
=== Leadership ===
Candidate	Votes	%
Giuseppe Conte	62,242	92.81
Against	4,822	7.19
Total votes	67,064	100.00
Source: Movimento 5 Stelle

Popular vote
Conte	92.81%
Against	7.19%

=== Statute ===
Choice	Votes	%
Yes	53,238	87.36
No	7,702	12.64
Total	60,940	100.00
Source: Huffington Post

Popular vote
Yes	87.36%
No	12.64%
