= Vittorio Cotesta =

Italian social scientist

- Born: 1944 (age 81–82); Roccagorga, Italy
- Occupation: Professor of sociology at the Roma Tre University

Vittorio Cotesta - Roccagorga (LT) (b. 1944, Italy) is an Italian social scientist. At present he is conducting research into global society, cosmopolitism and human rights, sociological theories, cultures, civilizations and ethnic conflict.

== Professional profile ==
He is professor of Sociology and the Sociology of Ethnic Relations at the Department of Education of Roma Tre University, Italy. He is the editor of Cires (Centro Interdipartimentale di Ricerche Sull’Educazione e la Società), the inter-disciplinary centre for research into education and society and Coordinator of the Ph.D. course in Social Services. He is a member of the board of "International Studies in Sociology and Social Anthropology" published by Brill (Leiden, The Netherlands). He edits "Globus. Prospettive sull'Europa, la società globale, il cosmopolitismo e i diritti umani"-Outlook on Europe, global society and human rights - (Carocci editore) and "Studi sull’Europa e sulla società globale" - Studies of Europe and the Global Society- (Rubbettino editore). He also coordinates the "Teorie sociologiche e trasformazioni sociali" – Theories of sociologies and social transformation- section of the Associazione italiana di sociologia (Ais)- Italian Association of Sociology . Between 2008 and 2012 he was a member of the Bureau of the Association Internationale des Sociologues de Langue Française (AISLF) – International association of French-speaking sociologists- . He was also a member of the "Social Cohesion in the Diversified European Knowledge Based Society" Network of Excellence. He was chair of the Degree Course in Sociology and Director of the Department of Sociology and Political Science at the Salerno State University. In 2003-2004 he was a Fellow of the Columbia University, New York, Reid Hall (Paris).

== Education ==
During his undergraduate years – for personal reasons he postponed matriculation for three years – he studied Philosophy and Social Science and took a particular interest in linguistic structuralism, cultural anthropology and philosophy. In 1969 he was awarded a degree in Pedagogy from University of Rome "La Sapienza" with a thesis on Marxism and structuralism.

== Research ==
=== The 1970s ===
During the 1970s he studied French culture and philosophy and was one of the first to take an interest in the work of Michel Foucault. To crown this field of interest, in 1969, he published a volume called ‘Linguaggio, Potere e Individuo (Language, Power and the Individual), an essay on Michel Foucault. Forms of legitimisation of power are also the focus of his subsequent studies, even if within a different theoretical framework. It was no longer Foucault or only Foucault that inspires him but rather the work of J. Habermas. To crown this period of his studies he published the essay Nuove legittimazioni (1984) (New Legitimations) where he examined various theories of truth and built a new normative theory of truth founded on three elements: 1) the coherence of the proposition; 2) the proposition’s correspondence with the world; 3) relations between the participants in discourse.

=== The 1980s ===
During the 1980s he carries out theoretical and empirical investigations of collective identities. In particular, he examines the new cities of the Agro Pontino area of Latium, the marshy lands south of Rome reclaimed under Mussolini, and the construction of identity in the city Latina (founded in 1928). The results of this broad, in-depth work are to be found in a number of essays including Modernità e tradizione (Modernity and Tradition). Integrazione sociale e identità culturale in una città nuova (1988) (Social integration and cultural identity in a new city). Astride the end of the 1980s and the beginning of the 1990s he devoted himself to a new area of studies: the social integration of immigrants and the potential ethnic strife arising from the presence on Italian soil of persons from different cultures, traditions, religions and life styles. On the one hand he focuses on forms of cooperation between immigrants and the native population, on the other, he analyses conflict between them. To carry out this kind of research he avails of a new methodology: the use of daily newspapers both as a source of information regarding the country’s social situation and as material though which to examine the ways the treat issues of immigration, the social exclusion of immigrants, strife and violence among immigrants and Italians. The conclusion reached by these studies is that the Italian media tend, systematically, to denigrate foreigners and exalt Italians. The results of these research projects were published in La cittadella assediata (1992) (The Besieged Citadel), Noi e loro (1995) (We and They), Sociologia dei conflitti etnici (1999) (The Sociology of Ethnic Conflict), Lo straniero (2002) (The Foreigner).

=== The 1990s ===
During the 1990s the author carried out theoretical investigations into social trust and capital and forms of solidarity. The results of these research projects inspire two types investigation: the first regarding the Italian social welfare system; the second the role played by social trust and capital in relationships within Fiat’s integrated automobile factory at Melfi (province of Potenza, Lucania region). The most important results of this work can be read in Fiducia, cooperazione e solidarietà (Trust, cooperation and solidarity). Strategie per il cambiamento sociale (1997) (Strategies for social change) and La Fabbrica integrata (2000) (The integrated factory).

=== The third millennium ===
These first years of the third millennium have been devoted to the study of two new topics: Europe and global society. In a certain sense these are completely new fields of study; in another they are a natural continuation of the studies carried out previously into migration, i ethnic strife and forms of social solidarity. Important stages of this work are the Sociology of the global world (2004) –Società globale e diritti umani (2008)- Global society and human rights. The results of research into Europe are contained in the volumes Le metamorfosi della sfera pubblica (2007)-Metamorphoses of the Public Sphere, Divenire europei (2008) (Becoming Europeans), Europa, Europa. Idee, immagini, percezioni (2010) (Europe. Europe. Ideas, images, perceptions). As coordinator of the Sociological Theories Section of the Italian Association of Sociologies he has devoted his energies in the last few years to a re-launching of theoretical discourse in the social sciences. Within this ambit he has organised seminars, conventions and study workshops. In 2008, in particular, in the occasione of the centenary of in occasione del Georg Simmel’s work, Sociology, he organised an international convention to investigate the importance of this seminal work to sociological studies, at the RomeTre University in Rome. The minutes and papers of the convention were collected in a two-volume work called Simmel e la cultura moderna (2010) (Simmel and modern culture). In 2010 again at Rome Tre, Rome he organised a convention on the Social Sciences and Europe. The main papers were published by the journal Quaderni di Sociologia (vol. 55, 2011).

In 2011, in Roma, again at Roma Tre, he organised a convention on Global society, Cosmopolitanism and Human Rights. The minutes and papers are about to be published by Cambridge Scholars Publishing.

Throughout the 2010s, he conducted studies on the Axial Age and on worldviews in Greco-Roman civilization, ancient Chinese civilization, and medieval Islam.

His analytical methodology draws inspiration from Max Weber’s works in comparative sociology (particularly *The Sociology of Religion*). The results of this intensive work are contained in his publications from recent years (*The Heavens and the Heart*, 2021, and *Max Weber on China*, 2018).

With the same objective in mind, he is now working on a comparison of the concept of modernity as conceived by Eric Voegelin, Jürgen Habermas, and Michel Foucault.

== Books ==
- Linguaggio, potere, individuo. Saggio su M. Foucault, Dedalo, 1979.
- Nuove legittimazioni, Ianua, 1984.
- Una nuova élite?, Bulzoni, 1986.
- Modernità e tradizione. Integrazione sociale e identità culturale in una "città nuova". Il caso di Latina, Franco Angeli, 1988/1989
- La città incompiuta, Gentile, 1997.
- La cittadella assediata. Immigrazione e conflitti etnici in Roma, Editori Riuniti, 1992
- Nuovi conflitti metropolitani, Gentile, 1997.
- Noi e loro. Immigrazione e nuovi conflitti metropolitani, Rubbettino, 1995
- Fiducia, cooperazione, solidarietà. Strategie per il cambiamento sociale, Liguori, 1998.
- Verità e linguaggio. Studi di sociologia della conoscenza, Armando, 1999.
- Lo straniero. Pluralismo culturale e immagini dell'altro nella società globale, Laterza, 2002;
- Sociologia del mondo globale, Laterza, 2004.
- Le migrazioni nella società globale, Anicia, 2007.
- Images du monde et société globale, PUL, 2006.
- Società globale e diritti umani, Rubbettino, 2008 .
- Sociologia dei conflitti etnici, Laterza, 2009.
- Les droits humains et la société globale, L'Harmattan, 2009.
- Sociologia dello straniero, Carocci, 2012.
- Global Society and Human Rights, Brill, 2012.
- Prosternarsi. Piccola indagine sulla regalità divina nelle civiltà euroasiatiche, Bevivino, 2012.
- Kings into Gods. How Prostration Shaped Eurasian Civilizations, Brill, 2015.
- Modernità e capitalismo. Saggio su Max Weber e la Cina, Armando, 2015.
- Max Weber on China. Modernity and Capitalism in a Global Perspective, Cambridge Scholars Publishing, 2018.
- The Heavens and the Earth. Graeco-Roman, Ancient Chinese, and Mediaeval Islamic Images of the World, Brill, Leiden-Boston, 2021.
- Il cielo e la terra. Immagini del mondo della civiltà greco-romana, cinese antica ed islamica medievale, Morlacchi, Perugia, 2022. La casa del popolo di Roccagorga (The People’s House of Roccagorga), Latina, Atlantide editore, 2024.
- I giorni della mia vita (The Days of My Life), Latina, Atlantide editore, 2024.
