= Luciano del Castillo =

Italian photographer (born 1960)

Luciano del Castillo (born 23 June 1960, Palermo) is an Italian photographer and journalist specializing in war photography.

== Biography ==
Castillo started working in 1980 as a photojournalist in Palermo for daily newspaper L'Ora and the agency Informazione fotografica by Letizia Battaglia and Franco Zecchin. In 1987, Castillo collaborated for "Action Press" in Hamburg on issues in Eastern European nations such as Romania, Poland, Hungary, and Yugoslavia. In 1986 and also from 1994 to 1996, he realized monographic dossiers for Iberian television TV3.

In 1994 in Rome, he worked for the national newspapers and magazines Il Corriere della Sera, la Repubblica, Il Messaggero, La Stampa, L'Unità, Avvenire, Panorama, L'Espresso, Famiglia Cristiana, and Diario, along with the international magazines and newspapers The Boston Globe, The Guardian, The Washington Post, International Herald Tribune, El País, La Vanguardia, El Tiempo, El Mundo, The Australian, and Der Spiegel.

From 1995 to April 2002, he worked for Agenzia Nazionale Stampa Associata (a.k.a. ANSA), an Italian news Agency in Rome. From June 2002 to January 2004, worked for the Associated Press in Rome. He has been working for ANSA since December 2005.

He was a speaker at a conference on the role of photography in war zones; the conference was organized by the Italian Foundation of Photography and took place in Turin in April 2002. In 2002, he published a dossier on the dangers of being a war reporter for weekly magazine Diario.

From 2002 to the end of 2005, he worked mainly abroad in areas of conflict, including for the Italian Department of Civil Defense for missions carried out in countries affected by natural disasters. Assignments he attended to were for an earthquake in Bam, Iran; an earthquake in Al Hoceima, Morocco; and the 2004 tsunami in Sri Lanka.

In 2005, he published a dossier from Nasiriya, Iraq titled "Brigata Combat Camera" in the weekly magazine L'Espresso.

Castillo has collaborated, along with Professor Luigi Goglia, with the faculty of history of journalism and mass communication at Università degli Studi Roma Tre.

Castillo was a teacher at the annual course for journalists working in areas of crisis, organized by the Ministry of Defense and in collaboration with the Federazione Nazionale Stampa Italiana.

In 2008, he contributed to the publication of the Palestinian magazine "Wameed".

== Exhibitions ==
- Dalla luna al vento (cf. lagazzettanizzena.it), School Library Institute ITCG Mario Rapisardi, February 2015, Caltanissetta
- Ventanas (cf. prensa-latina.cu), (Noviembre Fotográfico cf. fototecadecuba.com), Casa del Alba Cultural, November 2013, The Havana, Cuba
- Grida Silenziose on Tsunami in Sri Lanka, Provincia di Roma, January- February 2005, Rome
- A proposito di Est (Fotografia Festival di Roma cf. edizioni.fotografiafestival.it), April 2005, Rome
- Danni collaterali (cf. corriere.it) March 2007, Rome
- Suggestioni (Fotografia Festival di Roma, archiviostorico.corriere.it, cf. edizioni.fotografiafestival.it), May - June 2007, Rome
- Con il cuore negli occhi (Reggio Photo Fest, 2008;, cf. repubblica.it)
- I volti della crisi (cf. regione.toscana.it) agosto 2009, Marciana Marina, Isola d'Elba
- Se la guerra è civile (cf. repubblica.it, cf. ecodisicilia.com), February 2010, Palermo
- Microcosmos XV Italian Culture week in Cuba (cf. ansa.it),, (cf. amblavana.esteri.it), November 26 - December 2, 2012, Havana, Cuba

== Publications ==
- Cover photo: L'Italia degli anni di fango (cf. ibs.it), Indro Montanelli, Mario Cervi, Rizzoli 1993
- Cover photo: Editoriali (cf. bonannoeditore.com), Pierluigi Diaco e Alessandro Curzi, Bonanno editore 1993
- Cover photo: Una vita, una speranza: Antonino Caponnetto (cf. bonannoeditore.com), a cura di Pierluigi Diaco e Roberto Pavone, Bonanno editore 1993
- Cover photo: Curzi: il mestiere di giornalista, una conversazione OCLC 34810472, Pierluigi Diaco e Alessandro Curzi, Transeuropa editrice 1995
- Cover photo: El ultimo nazi (Priebke de la Argentina a Italia juicio a medio siglo de historia), (cf. abebooks.com), Elena Llorente e Martino Rigacci, Editorial Sudamericana, Barcelona, 1998
- Genoa. White Book, Ed. Genoa Social Forum in collaboration with "L’Unità", "Liberazione", il manifesto, 2001
- The path of movement. From Seattle to Porto Alegre in 2003 to one hundred million to the streets to the peace, (cf. www.intramoenia.it), AA. VV. Ed. Carta Intra Moenia, 2003
- Pope Pius XII and the Holocaust, John Roth, Carol Rittner, Ed. Continuum, 2004
- Rapporto sulle attività internazionali 2002-2006 (cf. protezionecivile.it), edited by Italian Department of Civil Defense, 2006
- Il cinema e il caso Moro, Francesco Ventura Ed. Le Mani-Microart'S, 2008
- Sri Lanka, il rendiconto (cf. protezionecivile.it), edited by Italian Department of Civil Defense, 2008
- Cover photo: Еще один круг на карусели - One More Ride on the Merry-go-round,(cf. slovo-online.ru), Tiziano Terzani, Russian edition, Slovo Publisher, Moscow, 2009
- Don Vito. Le relazioni segrete tra Stato e mafia nel racconto di un testimone d'eccezione, Massimo Ciancimino e Francesco la Licata, (cf. lafeltrinelli.it), 2010;
- La città cosmopolita. 1 Geografie dell'ascolto, Vincenzo Guarrasi (cf. palumboeditore.it), 2012
- Eccellenza italiana, Cristina Palumbo Crocco (vd. rubbettinoeditore.it), 2012;
- Poesía escondida - La Habana - Cuba, Luciano del Castillo (cf. Tempesta editore) (cf. Ansa.it), (cf. fotoup.net), (cf. amblavana.esteri.it), 2012
- Nord Meridiano, Francesco De Filippo, Maria Frega (cf. Editori Internazionali Riuniti), 2014
- Dalla luna al vento, donne nelle fotografie di Luciano del Castillo, Luciano del Castillo (cf. Tempesta editore), (cf Ansa.it), (cf. repubblica.it), 2014
