= Roberto Cipriani =

Italian social scientist

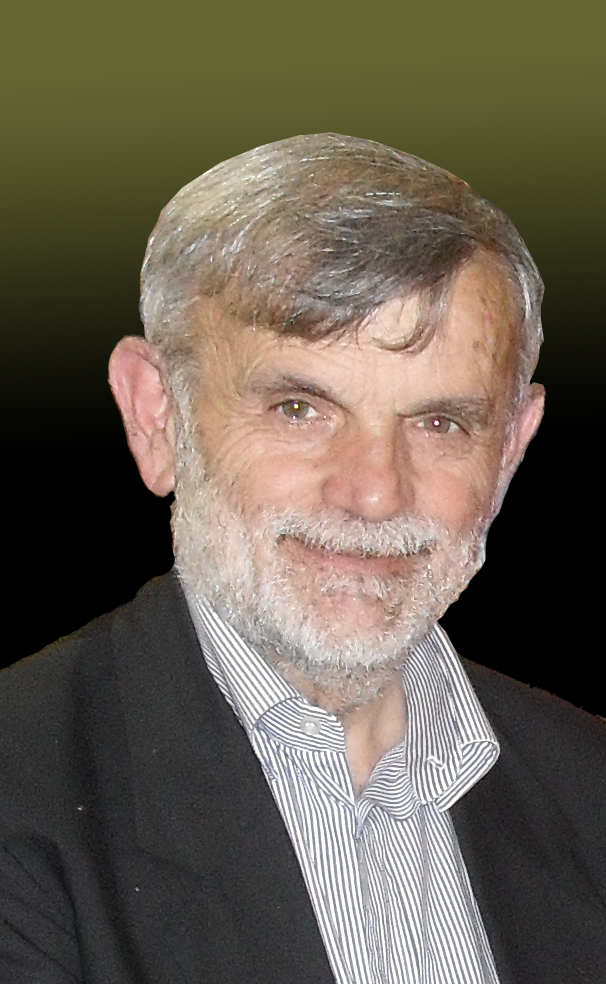
- Roberto Cipriani, Italian social scientist
- Born: 1945 (age 80–81); Rovato, Italy
- Occupations: Professor emeritus of sociology at the Roma Tre University and President of the European Council of National Associations of Sociology (2009-2015)
- Known for: Analytical contributions to the concept of diffused religion

Roberto Cipriani (b. Rovato, 1945) is an Italian social scientist. He is professor emeritus of sociology at Roma Tre University. "He has written extensively on popular religion, the sacred and secularization", and is known for his unconventional applications of the "concept of 'diffused religion' (religione diffusa) and then that of 'religion of values' (religione dei valori)". He has made analytical contributions to the concept of diffused religion by using grounded theory. "He also underlines what he calls the 'meta-institutional' character of this religion, even if, he says, these characteristics have a religious institutional origin".

== Career ==
He is the author of more than ninety books and one thousand one hundred articles and his work has been translated into English, French, Russian, Spanish, German, Chinese, Basque, Catalan, Polish, Turkish and Portuguese.

He graduated from University of Rome "La Sapienza" in 1968, with a thesis on "Sociology of religion in Italy." In 1971 he began his collaboration with the journal La critica sociologica, founded and directed by Franco Ferrarotti. From 1990 to 1994 he was president of the "Research Committee" of Sociology of Religion in the International Sociological Association.

From 1997 he has been a Professor of Sociology at Roma Tre University, where from 2001 to 2012 he directed the Department of Education. From 2004 to 2007 he was President of the Italian Association of Sociology. From 1995 to 1998 he was editor-in-chief of International Sociology. From 2007 to 2008 he was co-editor of Annual Review of Italian Sociology. In 2006 he was Chancellor Dunning Trust Lecturer at Queen's University, Kingston, Canada, on Human Values - Religious and Secular.

In 2008 he was Directeur d'Etudes at Maison des Sciences de l'Homme in Paris. From 2009 to 2015 he was made president of the European Council of National Associations of Sociology, part of the European Sociological Association.

He has written and/or directed some research movies on popular feasts, namely on Holy Week in Cerignola (Italy) ("Rossocontinuo with English comment", directed by Toni Occhiello) and in Spain ("Semana Santa en Sevilla"), on patron saint feast in a Mexican pueblo ("Las fiestas de san Luís Rey", co-directed with Toni Occhiello) and, with Emanuela del Re, on festival of festivals in Haifa ("Haifa's answer").

He has conducted comparative empirical research in Italy in Orune (Sardinia), in Greece in Episkepsi (Corfu), in Piekary Śląskie and in Mexico in Nahuatzen (Michoacán), on the relationship between solidarity and community.

He was President of the Italian Association of University Professors. At the suggestion and invitation of Michael Burawoy, he was a candidate for President of the International Sociological Association at the XIII World Congress of Sociology in Yokohama in 2014. He edits the series 'Modernity and Society' by Armando Editore and 'Perspectives on the Sociology of Religion' by Edizioni Borla. He is on the editorial board of the journals Current Sociology, Religions, Sociedad y Religión, Sociétés, La Critica Sociologica, Religioni e Società. He is Advisory Editor of the Blackwell Encyclopedia of Sociology. He is an Associate of the Institute of Research on Population and Social Policy of the National Council of Research. He is President of ICSOR (International Center for the Sociology of Religion: www.icsor.it).

== Notes ==
1  DOBBELAERE, Karel in, SWATOS, William H. Jr. Encyclopedia of Religion and Society. London: AltaMira, 1998 p. 93 ISBN 0-7619-8956-0.
2  “Religion and politics. The italian case. Diffused religion”, Archives de sciences sociales des religions, 58/1, 1984, pp. 29–51.
3  ANTES, Peter, Armin W. Geertz, Randi R. Warne. New Approaches to the Study of Religion. v. 2 – Textual, Comparative, Sociological, and Cognitive Approaches, Berlin, Library of Congress, 2004, p. 203. ISBN 3-11-018175-4.
4  CIPRIANI 1992: 265, apud ANTES 2004, cit. Idem.
5  (Idem)
6  From his official site
7  Idem
8  "Cipriani, Roberto". Retrieved 31 March 2019.

== Main Books ==
- 2000. Sociology of Religion: An Historical Introduction, Aldine de Gruyter, New York.
- 2004-2005. Sociology of Religion: An Historical Introduction, China Renmin University Press, Beijing.
- 2004. Manuel de sociologie de la religion, L'Harmattan, Paris.
- 2007. Manual de sociologia da religião, Paulus, São Paulo.
- 2011. Manual de sociología de la religión, 2.a edición revisada y aumentada, Siglo Veintiuno Editores, Buenos Aires.
- 2013. Sociologia Cualitativa, Biblos, Buenos Aires;
- 2014. Din Sosyolojisi. Tarih ve Teoriler, Rağbet, Istanbul;
- 2015. Sociology of Religion. An Historical Introduction, translated by L. Ferrarotti, new introduction by H. G. Schneiderman, introduction by W. K. Ferguson, Transaction, New Brunswick, USA, London, UK;
- 2016. (a cura), Nuovo manuale di sociologia, Maggioli Editore, Santarcangelo di Romagna;
- 2017. Diffused Religion. Beyond Secularization, Palgrave Macmillan, Cham;
- 2018. (a cura) Nuovo manuale di sociologia, Maggioli Editore, Santarcangelo di Romagna;
- 2020. L’incerta fede. Un’indagine quanti-qualitativa in Italia, FrancoAngeli, Milano.

== Other publications ==
- Dalla teoria alla verifica. Indagine sui valori in mutamento, La Goliardica, Roma 1978;
- Il Cristo rosso. Riti e simboli, religione e politica nella cultura popolare, Ianua, Roma 1985;
- La religione diffusa. Teoria e prassi, Borla, Roma 1988;
- Sud e religione. Dal magico al politico, Borla, Roma 1990 (in collaborazione con Maria Mansi);
- La religione dei valori. Indagine nella Sicilia centrale, Sciascia, Caltanissetta-Roma, 1992;
- Sociologie del tempo. Tra crònos e kairòs, Euroma, Roma-Bari 1997;
- Manuale di sociologia della religione, Borla, Roma 1997;
- Il pueblo solidale, F. Angeli, Milano 2005;
- Nuovo manuale di sociologia della religione, Borla, Roma 2009;
- Sociologia del pellegrinaggio, Franco Angeli, Milano 2012.
- (organizador), A religião no espaço público. Atores e objetos, erceiro Nome, São Paulo 2012, in collaborazione con Oro, Steil, Giumbelli;

For a complete bibliography, see Pubblicazioni del prof. Cipriani e BIBLIOGRAFIA DEL PROF. ROBERTO CIPRIANI.
