= Roma Tre University =

Public university in Rome, Italy

- Università degli Studi Roma Tre
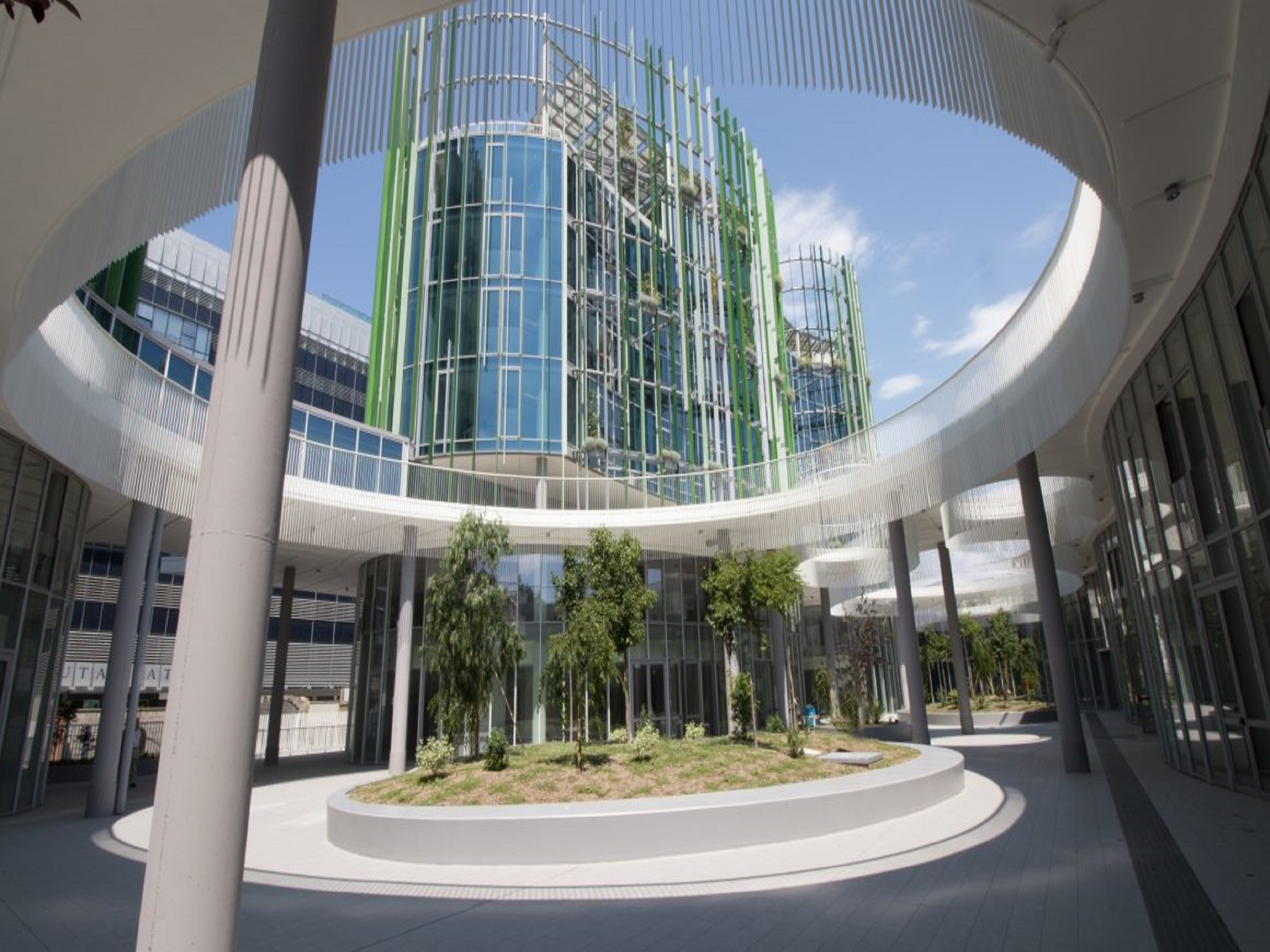
- Type: Public
- Established: 1992; 34 years ago
- Affiliations: CINECA; EUA; H2CU; ICoN; UNICA; UNIMED; UNISCAPE
- Endowment: € 263.8 million (2012)
- Rector: Massimiliano Fiorucci
- Administrative staff: 1,370
- Students: 34,763
- Location: Rome, Italy; 41°51′43″N 12°28′47″E
- Campus: Urban
- Colors: Blue
- Nickname: Levrieri
- Sporting affiliations: CUS Mo.Re
- Mascot: Levriero Italiano
- Website: uniroma3.it/int

Roma Tre University (Italian: Università degli Studi Roma Tre) is an Italian public research university in Rome, Italy. All its offices and departments are located in the Ostiense district area.

Founded in 1992 by the Ministry of Public Education, under the request of several professors of the Sapienza University of Rome, it was the third public university to be established in the metropolitan area of Rome. It is the second-largest university of Rome by enrollment and one of the largest research-based institutions in the country.

== History ==
The idea of founding a third university in Rome was flagged in the middle 1980s when the Ministry of Public Education formed a committee of inquiry into higher education to deal with a perceived emergency in university enrollments in Rome. After much debate, a future campus location was selected in what was a semi-industrial part of the city and it was decided that the future university be named with a number in chronological order. Roma Tre University, was formally established in 1992 under the name Terza Università degli Studi di Roma ('Third University of Rome'). One of the milestones for Roma Tre, since its foundation, as well as a guideline for its development, was its incorporation in the surrounding area, characterised by the reclamation of old buildings and school premises, transformed into facilities for study and research.

Pope Francis visited the university, Rome's youngest, on February 17, 2017.

== Organization and administration ==
The university comprises 8 schools and 12 departments, enrolling 34,763 students and having 1,370 academic and professional staff. At present, the university offers 54 undergraduate degree programs, 75 master's degree programs, 16 doctoral schools, and 5 PhD programs.

The Rector, the Vice Rector, the Academic Senate and the Board of Governors are the main governing bodies of the university, which are responsible for setting university policy and development strategy. The statute also provides for a University Executive Committee, the students' representative council, the Council of Faculty Deans, and a University Ombudsman.

The Rector is the official representative of the university. As well as calling and chairing meetings of the Academic Senate, the Board of Governors, and the University Executive Committee, the Rector supervises the university's teaching, scientific, and service structures, and gives appropriate guidance. The Rector also acts as ombudsman for the teaching and research autonomy of academic staff. The current Rector is Prof. Massimiliano Fiorucci.

=== International relations ===
==== Double degree agreements ====
The university has double degree agreements with:

- University of Murcia (Law)
- University of Poitiers (Law)
- Nova Southeastern University (Law)

==== International agreements ====
Roma Tre University holds a number of academic cooperation agreements with foreign universities, promoting professors, researchers, and students mobility and exchange.

The global partnerships include the University of Brasília, the École Polytechnique Fédérale de Lausanne, the University of Passo Fundo, the University of Talca, and the University of Valparaíso.

==== International networks ====
Roma Tre University takes part into a series of international university networks that share the task of promoting cooperative activities in diverse fields and seek to create a European area of communal higher education.

The association groups and networks of which Roma Tre University is a member are:

- European Network of Universities for the Implementation of the European Landscape Convention
- European University Association
- Institutional Network of the Universities from the Capitals of Europe
- Mediterranean Universities Union

== Academics ==
=== Admission ===
Every school offers a limited number of places for each program, and admissions are regulated by an entrance examination delivered by the University Admissions Committee.

- The School of Architecture admits 180 students each year.
- The School of Law admits 1,000 students each year.

=== Schools ===
The primary objective of the 8 schools of Roma Tre University is to define, organise, and connect the academic activities of the degree courses:

- School of Architecture (Facoltà di Architettura) – the School of Architecture offers undergraduate degree and master's degree qualifications. The school has a network of exchange programs with the European Union, Middle East, United States, and Eastern European universities. The School is constantly ranked in the top three of the country.
- Federico Caffè School of Economics (Facoltà di Economia "Federico Caffè") – the Federico Caffè School of Economics has set up exchange programs with other foreign universities and also agreements with national and international companies and institutions to enable its students to have a first contact with the job market during their studies. Graduates can choose different careers: managerial positions in financial, management, consulting, and auditing firms or banking group, in non-profit organizations and academic or professional careers in universities or research-oriented organizations.
- School of Education Sciences
- School of Engineering (Facoltà di Ingegneria)
- School of Law (Facoltà di Giurisprudenza) – the School of Law is located in via Ostiense in the Ostiense quarter just in front of the Basilica of Saint Paul Outside the Walls. It is constantly ranked between the third and the fifth place among over 60 Italian law schools. The School hosts the only Clinical Legal Program in Rome. The Clinic focuses primarily on human rights, immigration, and refugee law.
- School of Literature and Philosophy (Facoltà di Lettere e Filosofia) – the School of Literature and Philosophy offers traditional subjects such as Literature, Philosophy, History, Classical Studies, Archeology as well as new courses such as History of Art, Music and Performing Arts. The School is located in via Ostiense.
- School of Mathematical, Physical and Natural Sciences – the School of Mathematical, Physical and Natural Sciences comprises different scientific and research areas spanning from mathematics to chemistry, from physics to information science, from geology to biology and biotechnology, from natural sciences to astronomy, from the environmental science to conservation and restoration of the cultural heritage.
- School of Political Sciences (Facoltà di Scienze Politiche)
- Astre School of Advanced Studies was the university superior graduate school for particularly motivated students. Roma Tre University has established, among the others, an exchange agreement within the school's program with the University of California, Berkeley.

=== Research centers ===
- Center for Italian and French Studies – the Center for Italian and French Studies is located in the 16th-century Palazzo Capizucchi, the chapel of which is today the center's Conference Room. The Center runs the Guillaume Apollinaire Library; it coordinates and hosts research and consultation activities through contracts and agreements signed with institutions, Italian and French public and private bodies, as well as with European Union bodies. It sets up databases, bibliographical, and documentation services which are available on line; it publishes in its own library series the specialised material resulting from the research carried out within the framework of the centre's activities. It organises congresses, conferences, and seminars for students—undergraduates and PhD—and for external participants.
- La Faggeta Research Center – the La Faggeta Research Center is located in the comune (municipality) of Allumiere.
- Altiero Spinelli Center of Excellence – the center is part of the Jean Monnet Programme.
- Giovanni Pugliese Center of Excellence in European Law
- Interdepartmental Research Center for American Studies
- Interdepartmental Research Center for Education and Social Studies
- Interdepartmental Research Center for Evolutionary Ecology
- Interdepartmental Research Center for Institutional Economics
- Interdepartmental Research Center for Irish and Scottish Studies
- Giorgio Recchia Interdepartmental Research Center for Political, Constitutional and Comparative Law Studies
- Interdepartmental Research Center for Somali Studies

== Other facilities ==
- Museum of Zoology and Comparative Anatomy – the Museum of Zoology and Comparative Anatomy is a laboratory which supports both scientific research and education in Animal Biology. The major role of the museum is to conserve and exhibit zoological material to students, PhD, and researchers.
- Palladium Theatre – the Palladium Theatre is the university theatre. It was built between 1927 and 1929 by the architect Sabbatini and was completely renovated by the university.
- Roma Tre Farm – the farm is in a 24-acre (97,000 m^{2}) villa dating back to the 16th century in the comune of Ciampino. The university supports a Sustainable Food Project.

== Rankings ==
Roma Tre University is ranked:

University rankings

Global – Overall
- QS World: 901-950 (2026)

- 570 out of 20,300 universities in the World Rank of the Webometrics Ranking of World Universities;
- 392 out of 11,000 universities in the uniRank.org World University Ranking;
- 858 out of 3,042 universities in the Global Ranking of the SCImago Institutions Rankings;
- 698 out of 2,500 universities in the World Ranking of the University Ranking by Academic Performance.

The School of Economics is ranked in the top 25% institutions in Italy in the RePEc ranking.

== Student life ==
Student life at the university does not merely revolve around lectures and exams, as there is a diverse array of student activities. There are many student organisations organizing student exchange programmes throughout Europe.

Students elect their representatives (Student Vice-Dean and the Student Parliament) to coordinate various student activities, represent their interests in the Faculty bodies, participate in the evaluation of studies and the faculty, and secure the involvement and participation of students in all matters and issues of interest to them.

- Contribution to the arts – Roma Tre hosts the annual Roma Tre Film Festival at the Palladium Theatre.
- Roma Tre News – Roma Tre News is the student newspaper of the university. It is run entirely by undergraduate and graduate students. Many alumni have gone on to careers in journalism.

=== Traditions ===
Every year, during the academic year opening ceremony, a distinguished public figure is invited to address the students with a lecture on a current global issue. Since the university foundation, there have been 5 Heads of state speaking at the ceremony. Past speakers include Antonio Ruberti, the ninth President of Italy Oscar Luigi Scalfaro, the 49th Prime Minister of Italy Carlo Azeglio Ciampi, Leah Rabin, Shirin Ebadi, the member of the executive board of the European Central Bank Tommaso Padoa-Schioppa, the seventh European Commissioner for Research, Innovation and Science Philippe Busquin, the 264th Pope John Paul II, Kerry Kennedy, Marco Travaglio, the sixth President of the European Parliament Josep Borrell Fontelles, the 34th President of Chile Michelle Bachelet, the 11th President of Italy Giorgio Napolitano, and the 52nd Prime Minister of Italy Romano Prodi.

== Notable alumni and faculty ==
Notable alumni include: Andrea Alù, Alessandro Di Battista, Joseph Pace, Marco Lo Muscio, Raffaele Monti, Virginia Raggi, and Cinzia Giorgio. Among the prominent scholars who have taught at Roma Tre University include Pier Luigi Luisi, Pierangelo Garegnani, Paolo Leon, Andrea Riccardi, Sofia Corradi, Luciano del Castillo, Giuseppe Conte, Giorgio Melchiori, Giacomo Marramao, Mario De Caro, Roberto Cipriani, Vittorio Cotesta, Amos Luzzatto, and Federico Schiano di Pepe.
