= Offbeatr =

Pornography website

- Website type: Crowd funding
- Available in: English
- Headquarters: Los Angeles, United States
- Website: offbeatr.com
- Commercial: Yes
- Launched: August 9, 2012
- Current status: Closed (February 9, 2016)

Offbeatr was a US website for crowdfunding pornography. It has been described as “Kickstarter for porn”. Project creators posted pitches for new projects, which could be media, events or objects. The user community voted on projects. If a project got enough votes, it would open for funding. If a project met its goal, then the project creator got the funds. Project creators could also sell previously created material. Projects had to be based in either United States, United Kingdom, Germany, Canada, France, Australia, or New Zealand.

Offbeatr was launched in August 2012 by the Los Angeles-based start-up Extra Lunch Money. As of August 2012 it had a team of five and was self-funded.

As of February 14, 2013, over $70,000 in pledges had been funded in seven projects, mostly relating to furry fandom.

The site went inactive on February 9, 2016 (following a February 2, 2016 announcement), with a new blog entry announcing the closure.

== See also ==
- Comparison of crowd funding services
- Mobcaster
