= Internationales Kulturinstitut =

The Internationales Kulturinstitut (English: International Culture Institute) is a language school in Vienna, Austria, which specialises in teaching German as a foreign language. Each month, between 250 and 350 students from several countries study at IKI. The school annually organises a Spring in Vienna programme in co-operation with the University of Washington.

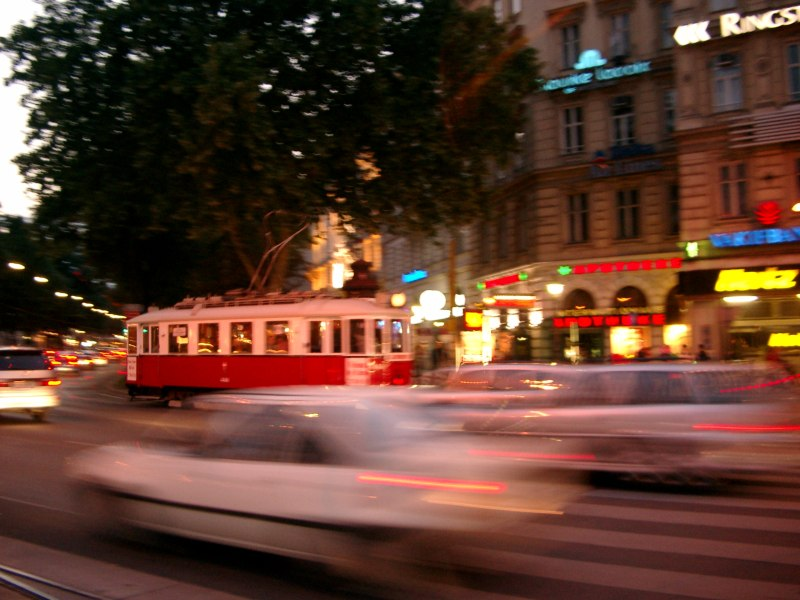
IKI at night

The school offers full-time, part-time, intensive and evening classes. Most students choose to spend between 1 – 18 months studying in Vienna, with 3 hours of classes per day. Evening classes can be spread out across a semester, and individual tuition is available.

IKI is an Österreichisches Sprachdiplom (an Austrian oral examination) examination centre, and is a member of the Union of Austrian Language Schools (Campus Austria), which was founded by the Austrian Ministry of Education, Science and Culture.

The school's main campus, including the reception, school office, and five classrooms is located near the Vienna State Opera House at Opernring. A second, smaller campus is located nearby, at Bösendorferstraße. Both campuses are near Karlsplatz/Oper underground station, and are within walking distance of each other.

From through September, accommodation is provided in Haus Salzburg, a student dormitory in Mariahilf.
