= Mobcaster =

Defunct US television crowd-funding website

- Website type: Crowd funding
- Available in: English
- Headquarters: New York (city), {{{location_country}}}
- Website: mobcaster.com
- Commercial: Yes
- Launched: 2011

Mobcaster was a US website for crowdfunding television shows. It would also distribute shows once they were produced. Project creators posted ideas for pilots. If the pilots got funded, then project creators could post projects for full production. Mobcaster charged 5% of funding, plus 3% for PayPal charges. If a Mobcaster-funded show was picked up by other distribution outlets, Mobcaster held 15% participation in the show.

The site shut down in September 2013.

== See also ==
- Comparison of crowd funding services
- Offbeatr
