= Vito Crimi =

Italian politician (born 1972)

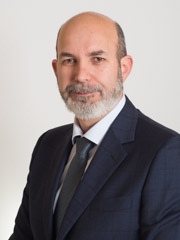

Leader of the Five Star Movement
- Acting
- In office 22 January 2020 – 6 August 2021
- Preceded by: Luigi Di Maio
- Succeeded by: Giuseppe Conte (as President)

Member of the Senate of the Republic
- In office 15 March 2013 – 12 October 2022
- Constituency: Lombardy

Personal details
- Born: Vito Claudio Crimi; 26 April 1972 (age 53) Palermo, Sicily, Italy
- Party: Five Star Movement
- Profession: Politician

Vito Claudio Crimi (born 26 April 1972) is an Italian politician, member of the Five Star Movement, of which he was appointed acting leader on 22 January 2020. From 2013 to 2022, he has been a serving member of the Italian Senate.

== Biography ==
Vito Crimi was born in Palermo, Sicily, in 1972. He grew up in the Brancaccio district; he enrolled in a degree course in mathematics at the University of Palermo, without completing his studies. In 2000 he moved to Brescia where he worked as a court clerk at the Appellate court.

In 2007 he joined the Friends of Beppe Grillo Meetup in Brescia. He was candidate for president with the Five Star Movement in the 2010 Lombard regional election, but obtained only 3% of the preferences.

In 2013 he was elected Senator in the Lombardy constituency, and from 19 March to 16 June he was chairman of the parliamentary group of the Five Star Movement in the Senate. He was re-elected Senator in 2018 and served as Undersecretary of State for the Presidency of the Council of Ministers with responsibility for publishing in the Conte I Cabinet.

On 13 September 2019, he was appointed Deputy Minister of the Interior in the second government of Giuseppe Conte.

Party political offices
Preceded by Luigi Di Maio	Acting Leader of the Five Star Movement; 2020–2021	Succeeded by Giuseppe Conte
