= Politics of Umbria =

Italian regional politics

The politics of Umbria, a region of Italy, takes place in the framework of an "anomalous presidential" representative democracy or prime-ministerial system with an executive presidency, whereby the president of the region is the head of government, and of a pluriform multi-party system. Legislative power is vested in the Legislative Assembly of Umbria, while executive power is exercised by the Regional Cabinet led by the President, who is directly elected by the people. The current statute, which regulates the functioning of regional institutions, has been in force since 2005.

After World War II Umbria became a stronghold of the Italian Communist Party. The Communists and their successors (the Democratic Party of the Left, the Democrats of the Left and finally the Democratic Party) have governed the region since 1970. For these reasons, Umbria was long considered part of the so-called "Red belt". The centre-left's dominance ended with the 2019 regional election, in which Donatella Tesei of Lega Nord–Umbria was elected President of Umbria by a landslide.

== Executive branch ==
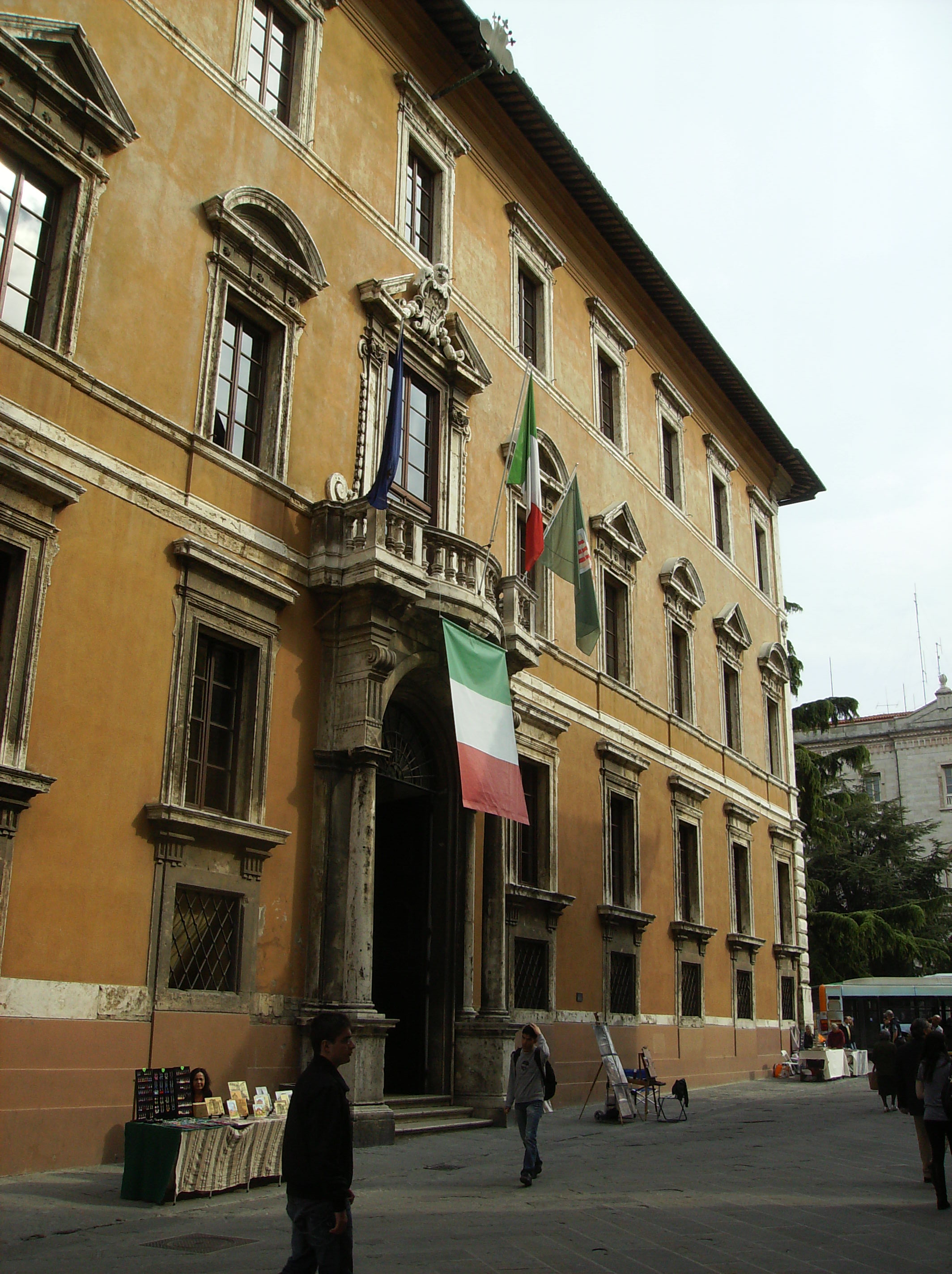
Palazzo Donini in Perugia is the seat of the Regional Cabinet.

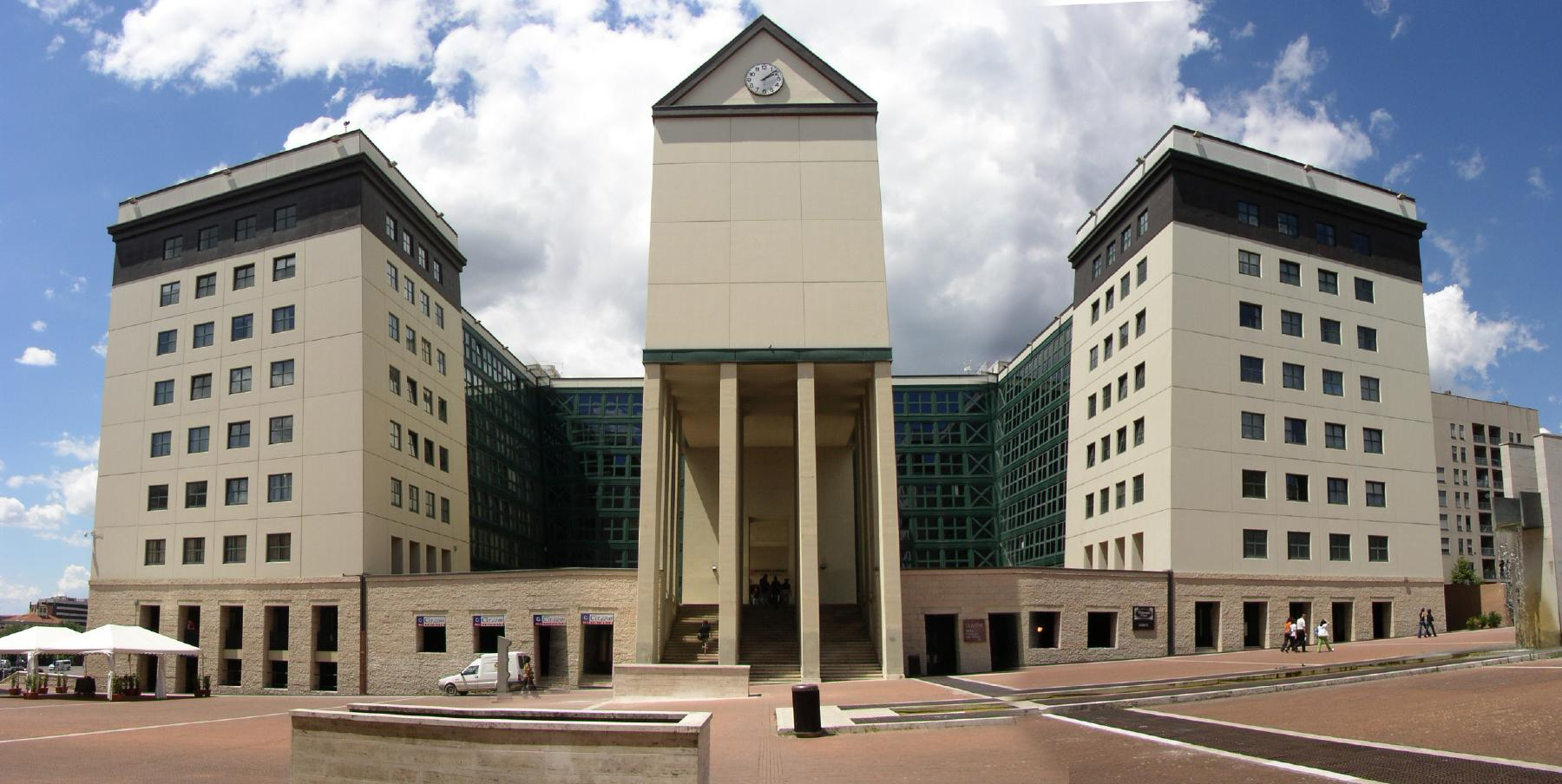
Palazzo Broletto in Perugia houses many offices of the regional government.

The Regional Cabinet (Giunta Regionale) is presided by the President of the Region (Presidente della Regione), who is elected for a five-year term, and is currently composed by 6 members: the President and 5 regional Assessors, including a Vice President (Vice Presidente).

=== Current composition ===
Stefania Proietti was officially sworn in as president on 2 December 2024. Current executive was officially sworn in on 18 December 2024.

| Party | | Members |
|---|---|---|
| Democratic Party | PD | Vice President and 2 assessors |
| Greens and Left Alliance | AVS | 1 assessor |
| Five Star Movement | M5S | 1 assessor |

| Assessor | Party | Delegate for |
|---|---|---|
| Tommaso Bori (vice president) | PD | Finance and budget, cultural heritage |
| Francesco De Rebotti | PD | Economic development, public transports, labour |
| Simona Meloni | PD | Agriculture, parks and territory, tourism, hunting and fishing, sport |
| Fabio Barcaioli | AVS | Education, welfare and social housing |
| Thomas De Luca | M5S | Environment and climate change, green energy, waste management |

=== List of presidents ===
| President | | Term of office | | Party | Coalition | Administration | Legislature |
|---|---|---|---|---|---|---|---|
Presidents elected by the Regional Council of Umbria (1970–1995)
| 1 | Pietro Conti (1928–1988) | 8 June 1970 | 16 June 1975 | PCI | PCI • PSI • PSIUP | Conti I | I (1970) |
| 1 | Pietro Conti (1928–1988) | 16 June 1975 | 5 July 1976 | PCI | PCI • PSI | Conti II | II (1975) |
| 2 | Germano Marri (b. 1932) | 5 July 1976 | 9 June 1980 | PCI | PCI • PSI | Marri I | II (1975) |
| 2 | Germano Marri (b. 1932) | 9 June 1980 | 13 May 1985 | PCI | PCI • PSI | Marri II | III (1980) |
| 2 | Germano Marri (b. 1932) | 13 May 1985 | 11 May 1987 | PCI | PCI • PSI | Marri III | IV (1985) |
| 3 | Francesco Mandarini (1942–2022) | 11 May 1987 | 17 July 1990 | PCI; PDS | PCI • PSI | Mandarini I | IV (1985) |
| 3 | Francesco Mandarini (1942–2022) | 17 July 1990 | 22 July 1992 | PCI; PDS | PCI • PSI | Mandarini II | V (1990) |
| 4 | Francesco Ghirelli (b. 1948) | 22 July 1992 | 31 March 1993 | PDS | PDS • PSI | Ghirelli | V (1990) |
| 5 | Claudio Carnieri (b. 1944) | 31 March 1993 | 5 June 1995 | PDS | PDS • PSI | Carnieri | V (1990) |
| Directly-elected Presidents (since 1995) | | | | | | | V (1990) |
| 6 | Bruno Bracalente (b. 1949) | 5 June 1995 | 17 April 2000 | PDS; DS | PDS • PRC • PPI | Bracalente | VI (1995) |
| 7 | Maria Rita Lorenzetti (b. 1953) | 17 April 2000 | 5 April 2005 | DS; PD | DS • PRC • PPI | Lorenzetti I | VII (2000) |
| 7 | Maria Rita Lorenzetti (b. 1953) | 5 April 2005 | 16 April 2010 | DS; PD | DS • DL • PRC • PdCI | Lorenzetti II | VIII (2005) |
| 8 | Catiuscia Marini (b. 1967) | 16 April 2010 | 10 June 2015 | PD | PD • IdV • FdS | Marini I | IX (2010) |
| 8 | Catiuscia Marini (b. 1967) | 10 June 2015 | 28 May 2019 | PD | PD • PSI • SEL | Marini II | X (2015) |
| 9 | Donatella Tesei (b. 1958) | 11 November 2019 | 2 December 2024 | LN | LN • FdI • FI | Tesei | XI (2019) |
| 10 | Stefania Proietti (b. 1975) | 2 December 2024 | Incumbent | Ind. | PD • M5S • AVS | Proietti | XII (2024) |

== Legislative branch ==
The Legislative Assembly of Umbria (Assemblea Legislativa dell'Umbria) is composed of 21 members. 19 councillors are elected in provincial constituencies by proportional representation using the largest remainder method with a Droop quota and open lists, while the remaining two are the elected President and the candidate for president who comes second. The winning coalition wins a bonus of seats in order to make sure the elected president has a majority in the assembly.

The assembly is elected for a five-year term, but, if the President suffers a vote of no confidence, resigns or dies, under the simul stabunt, simul cadent (literally they will stand together or they will fall together) clause introduced in the Italian Constitution in 1999 and later incorporate in the Statute of Umbria, also the assembly is dissolved and an early election is called.

=== Current composition ===
The Legislative Assembly is currently composed of the following political groups:

| Party | Seats | Status |
|---|---|---|
| Democratic Party (PD) | 9 / 21 | In government |
| Brothers of Italy (FdI) | 3 / 21 | In opposition |
| Forza Italia (FI) | 2 / 21 | In opposition |
| League (Lega) | 2 / 21 | In opposition |
| Umbria Tomorrow (UD) | 2 / 21 | In government |
| Five Star Movement (M5S) | 1 / 21 | In government |
| Greens and Left Alliance (AVS) | 1 / 21 | In government |
| Tesei for President | 1 / 21 | In opposition |

By coalition:

| Coalition | Seats | Status |
|---|---|---|
| Centre-left coalition | 13 / 21 | Government |
| Centre-right coalition | 8 / 21 | Opposition |

== Local government ==
=== Provinces ===
| Province | Inhabitants | President | Party | Election |
|---|---|---|---|---|
| Perugia | 671,821 | Massimiliano Presciutti | Independent | 2026 |
| Terni | 234,665 | Stefano Bandecchi | Independent | 2026 |

=== Municipalities ===
Umbria is also divided in 92 comuni (municipalities), most of which were established in the Middle Ages.

Provincial capitals

| Municipality | Inhabitants | Mayor | Party | Election |
|---|---|---|---|---|
| Perugia | 168,169 | Vittoria Ferdinandi | Independent (PD) | 2024 |
| Terni | 113,324 | Stefano Bandecchi | Popular Alternative | 2023 |

Other municipalities

Cities with more than 20,000 inhabitants.

| Municipality | Inhabitants | Mayor | Party | Election |
|---|---|---|---|---|
| Foligno | 55,328 | Stefano Zuccarini | Lega | 2024 |
| Città di Castello | 38,337 | Luca Secondi | Democratic Party | 2021 |
| Spoleto | 36,091 | Andrea Sisti | Democratic Party | 2021 |
| Gubbio | 30,339 | Vittorio Fiorucci | Independent (FI) | 2024 |
| Assisi | 28,143 | Stefania Proietti | Independent (PD) | 2021 |
| Bastia Umbra | 21,190 | Erigo Pecci | Democratic Party | 2024 |
| Corciano | 21,485 | Lorenzo Pierotti | Democratic Party | 2023 |

== Parties and elections ==
=== Latest regional election ===
In the latest regional election, which took place on 17–18 November 2024, Stefania Proietti (an independent supported by the Democratic Party) was elected President of Umbria by defeating incumbent President Donatella Tesei (Lega Umbria).

17–18 November 2024 Umbrian regional election results
| Candidates | Votes | % | Seats | Parties | Votes | % | Seats |
|---|---|---|---|---|---|---|---|
| Stefania Proietti | 182,394 | 51.13 | 1 | Democratic Party | 97,089 | 30.23 | 9 |
| Stefania Proietti | 182,394 | 51.13 | 1 | Five Star Movement | 15,125 | 4.71 | 1 |
| Stefania Proietti | 182,394 | 51.13 | 1 | Umbria Tomorrow – Proietti for President | 15,084 | 4.70 | 1 |
| Stefania Proietti | 182,394 | 51.13 | 1 | Greens and Left Alliance | 13,750 | 4.28 | 1 |
| Stefania Proietti | 182,394 | 51.13 | 1 | Umbria for Public Healthcare | 7,819 | 2.43 | – |
| Stefania Proietti | 182,394 | 51.13 | 1 | Future Umbria | 7,402 | 2.30 | – |
| Stefania Proietti | 182,394 | 51.13 | 1 | Umbrian Civics | 5,025 | 1.56 | – |
| Stefania Proietti | 182,394 | 51.13 | 1 | Total | 161,294 | 50.23 | 12 |
| Donatella Tesei | 164,727 | 46.17 | 1 | Brothers of Italy | 62,419 | 19.44 | 3 |
| Donatella Tesei | 164,727 | 46.17 | 1 | Forza Italia | 31,128 | 9.69 | 2 |
| Donatella Tesei | 164,727 | 46.17 | 1 | League | 24,729 | 7.70 | 1 |
| Donatella Tesei | 164,727 | 46.17 | 1 | Tesei for President | 16,023 | 4.99 | 1 |
| Donatella Tesei | 164,727 | 46.17 | 1 | Us Moderates | 9,229 | 2.87 | – |
| Donatella Tesei | 164,727 | 46.17 | 1 | Popular Alternative | 6,939 | 2.16 | – |
| Donatella Tesei | 164,727 | 46.17 | 1 | Union of the Centre | 1,432 | 0.45 | – |
| Donatella Tesei | 164,727 | 46.17 | 1 | Total | 151,899 | 47.30 | 7 |
| Marco Rizzo | 3,946 | 1.11 | – | Sovereign Popular Democracy | 1,793 | 0.56 | – |
| Marco Rizzo | 3,946 | 1.11 | – | Reformist Alternative for Rizzo | 1,286 | 0.40 | – |
| Marco Rizzo | 3,946 | 1.11 | – | Total | 3,079 | 0.96 | – |
| Martina Leonardi | 1,901 | 0.53 | – | Together for a Resistant Umbria | 1,556 | 0.48 | – |
| Moreno Pasquinelli | 993 | 0.28 | – | Dissident Front | 896 | 0.28 | – |
| Giuseppe Paolone | 866 | 0.24 | – | Force of the People | 763 | 0.24 | – |
| Elia Francesco Fiorini | 840 | 0.24 | – | Alternative for Umbria | 746 | 0.23 | – |
| Giuseppe Tritto | 837 | 0.23 | – | United Humans Together | 729 | 0.23 | – |
| Fabrizio Pignalberi | 253 | 0.07 | – | More Sovereign Italy | 109 | 0.03 | – |
| Fabrizio Pignalberi | 253 | 0.07 | – | Fifth Pole for Italy | 67 | 0.02 | – |
| Fabrizio Pignalberi | 253 | 0.07 | – | Total | 176 | 0.05 | – |
| Total candidates | 356,757 | 100.00 | 2 | Total parties | 321,138 | 100.00 | 19 |
| Blank and invalid votes | 10,046 | | | | | | |
| Registered voters/turnout | 701,367 | 52.30 | | | | | |
Source: Ministry of the Interior – Election in Umbria
