= Legislative Assembly of Umbria =

Legislative organ of Umbria, Italy

Legislative Assembly of Umbria Assemblea legislativa dell'Umbria
- 12th legislature

Type
- Type: Regional council Unicameral
- Established: 20 July 1970

Leadership
- President: Sarah Bistocchi, PD since 19 December 2024

Structure
- Seats: 21
- Political groups: Government (13): PD (9); UD (2); AVS (1); M5S (1); Opposition (8): FdI (3); FI (2); Lega (2); Tesei List (1)
- Length of term: 5 years

Elections
- Voting system: Party-list semi-proportional representation with majority bonus D'Hondt method
- Last election: 17 November 2024
- Next election: No later than 18 November 2029

Meeting place
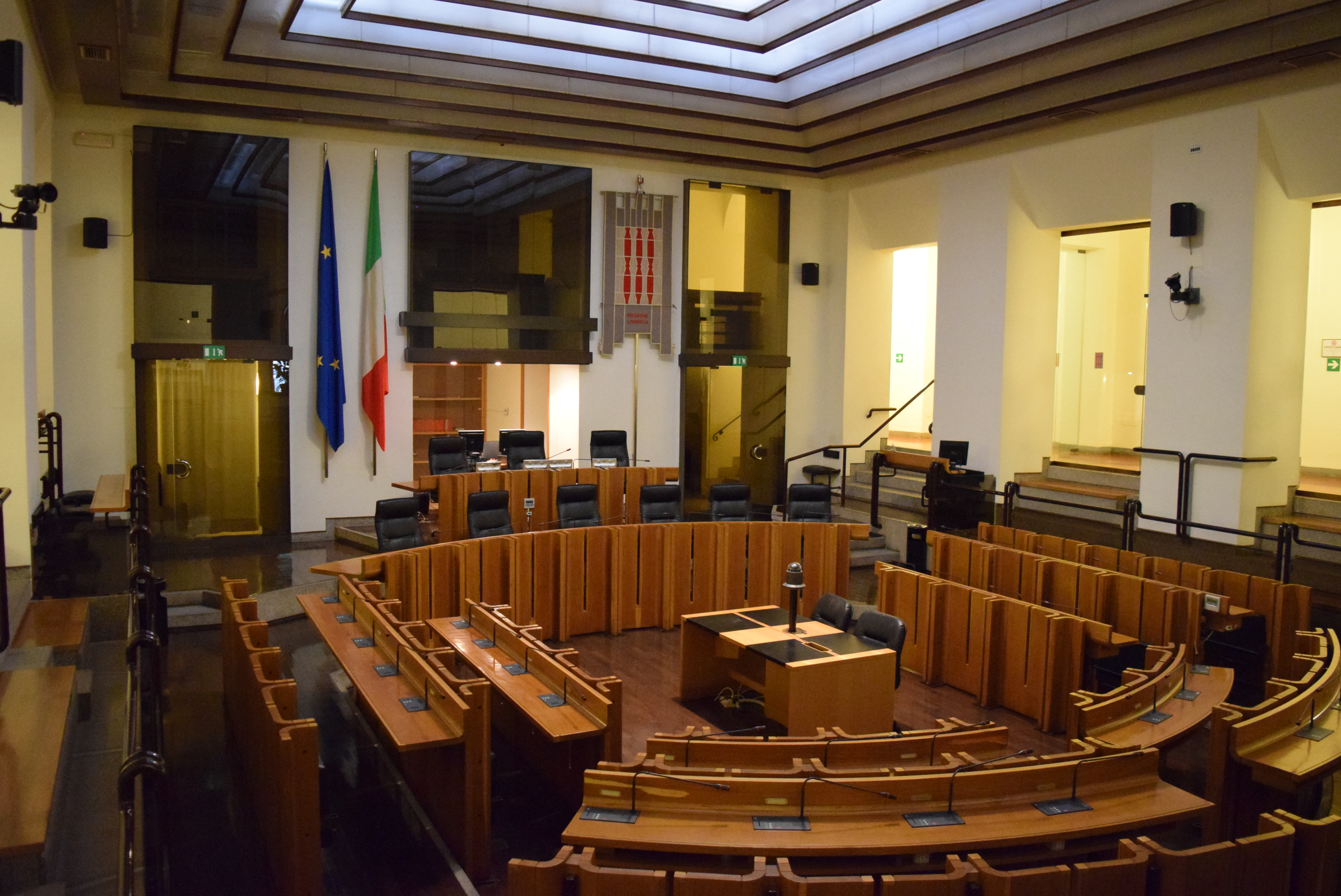
- Meeting Room, Palazzo Cesaroni, Perugia

Website
- Official website

The Legislative Assembly of Umbria (Italian: Assemblea Legislativa dell'Umbria) is the legislative assembly of the Umbria region of Italy.

It was first elected in 1970, when the ordinary regions were instituted, on the basis of the Constitution of Italy of 1948.

== Composition ==
The Legislative Assembly of Umbria (Assemblea Legislativa dell'Umbria) is composed of 21 members. 19 councillors are elected in provincial constituencies by proportional representation using the largest remainder method with a Droop quota and open lists, while the remaining two are the elected President and the candidate for president who comes second. The winning coalition wins a bonus of seats in order to make sure the elected president has a majority in the assembly.

The assembly is elected for a five-year term, but, if the President suffers a vote of no confidence, resigns or dies, under the simul stabunt, simul cadent (literally they will stand together or they will fall together) clause introduced in the Italian Constitution in 1999 and later incorporated in the Statute of Umbria, also the assembly is dissolved and an early election is called.

=== Political groups (2024–2029) ===
The Legislative Assembly is currently composed of the following political groups:

| Party | Seats | Status |
|---|---|---|
| Democratic Party (PD) | 9 / 21 | In government |
| Brothers of Italy (FdI) | 3 / 21 | In opposition |
| Forza Italia (FI) | 2 / 21 | In opposition |
| League (Lega) | 2 / 21 | In opposition |
| Umbria Tomorrow (UD) | 2 / 21 | In government |
| Five Star Movement (M5S) | 1 / 21 | In government |
| Greens and Left Alliance (AVS) | 1 / 21 | In government |
| Tesei for President | 1 / 21 | In opposition |

By coalition:

| Coalition | Seats | Status |
|---|---|---|
| Centre-left coalition | 13 / 21 | Government |
| Centre-right coalition | 8 / 21 | Opposition |

=== Historical composition ===
| Election | PCI | PSI | DC | PRI | PSDI | MSI | Others | Total |
|---|---|---|---|---|---|---|---|---|
| 7 June 1970 | 13 | 3 | 9 | 1 | 2 | 2 | | 30 |
| 15 June 1975 | 14 | 4 | 9 | 1 | 1 | 1 | | 30 |
| 8 June 1980 | 14 | 4 | 9 | 1 | 1 | 1 | | 30 |
| 12 May 1985 | 14 | 4 | 9 | 1 | | 2 | | 30 |
| 6 May 1990 | 12 | 5 | 9 | 1 | | 1 | 2 | 30 |

| Election | Majority | Opposition | Council | President of the Region |
|---|---|---|---|---|
| 23 April 1995 | Centre-left (The Olive Tree) 18 / 30 | Centre-right (Pole for Freedoms) 12 / 30 | | Bruno Bracalente (1995–2000) |
| 16 April 2000 | Centre-left (The Olive Tree) 20 / 30 | Centre-right (House of Freedoms) 10 / 30 | | Maria Rita Lorenzetti (2000–2010) |
| 3 April 2005 | Centre-left (The Union) 19 / 30 | Centre-right (House of Freedoms) 11 / 30 | | Maria Rita Lorenzetti (2000–2010) |
| 28 March 2010 | Centre-left 20 / 31 | Centre-right 10 / 31 UDC 1 / 31 | | Catiuscia Marini (2010–2019) |
| 31 May 2015 | Centre-left 13 / 21 | Centre-right 6 / 21 M5S 2 / 21 | | Catiuscia Marini (2010–2019) |
| 27 October 2019 (snap election) | Centre-right 13 / 21 | Centre-left 8 / 21 | | Donatella Tesei (2019–2024) |
| 17 November 2024 | Centre-left 13 / 21 | Centre-right 8 / 21 | | Stefania Proietti (since 2024) |

== Presidents ==
This is a list of the Presidents of the Legislative Assembly (Italian: Presidenti dell'Assemblea Legislativa):

| Name | Period | | Regional Legislature |
|---|---|---|---|
| Fabio Fiorelli (PSI) | 20 July 1970 | 26 July 1975 | I (1970) |
| Fabio Fiorelli (PSI) | 26 July 1975 | 30 July 1977 | II (1975) |
| Settimio Gambuli (PCI) | 30 July 1977 | 1978 | II (1975) |
| Massimo Arcamone (PRI) | 1978 | 1979 | II (1975) |
| Roberto Abbondanza (PCI) | 1979 | 21 July 1980 | II (1975) |
| Enzo Paolo Tiberi (PRI) | 21 July 1980 | 17 June 1985 | III (1980) |
| Giampaolo Bartolini (PCI) | 17 June 1985 | 13 May 1987 | IV (1985) |
| Velio Lorenzini (PSI) | 13 May 1987 | 17 June 1990 | IV (1985) |
| Sannio Panfili (PCI) | 17 June 1990 | 23 July 1991 | V (1990) |
| Claudio Spinelli (PRI) | 23 July 1991 | 22 July 1992 | V (1990) |
| Mariano Borgognoni (PDS) | 22 July 1992 | 31 May 1993 | V (1990) |
| Giampaolo Bartolini (PRC) | 31 May 1993 | 28 December 1993 | V (1990) |
| Luciano Neri (FdV) | 28 December 1993 | 30 May 1995 | V (1990) |
| Gianpiero Bocci (PPI) | 30 May 1995 | 23 July 1997 | VI (1995) |
| Carlo Liviantoni (PPI) | 23 July 1997 | 30 May 2000 | VI (1995) |
| Giorgio Bonaduce (PdCI) | 30 May 2000 | 21 December 2000 | VII (2000) |
| Carlo Liviantoni (PPI) | 21 December 2000 | 15 April 2004 | VII (2000) |
| Mauro Tippolotti (PRC) | 15 April 2004 | 17 May 2005 | VII (2000) |
| Mauro Tippolotti (PRC) | 17 May 2005 | 1 April 2009 | VIII (2005) |
| Fabrizio Felice Bracco (PD) | 1 April 2009 | 16 April 2010 | VIII (2005) |
| Eros Brega (PD) | 16 April 2010 | 20 June 2015 | IX (2010) |
| Donatella Porzi (PD) | 20 June 2015 | 3 December 2019 | X (2015) |
| Marco Squarta (FdI) | 3 December 2019 | 18 July 2024 | XI (2019) |
| Eleonora Pace (FdI) | 18 July 2024 | 19 December 2024 | XI (2019) |
| Sarah Bistocchi (PD) | 19 December 2024 | Incumbent | XII (2024) |

== See also ==
- Regional council
- Politics of Umbria
- President of Umbria
