= Elections in Umbria =

Elections in Italian region

This page gathers the results of elections in Umbria.

== Regional elections ==
=== Latest regional election ===
In the latest regional election, which took place on 17–18 November 2024, Stefania Proietti (an independent supported by the Democratic Party) was elected President of Umbria by defeating incumbent Presidente Donatella Tesei (Lega Umbria).

17–18 November 2024 Umbrian regional election results
Candidates	Votes	%	Seats	Parties	Votes	%	Seats
Stefania Proietti	182,394	51.13	1	Democratic Party	97,089	30.23	9
Stefania Proietti	182,394	51.13	1	Five Star Movement	15,125	4.71	1
Stefania Proietti	182,394	51.13	1	Umbria Tomorrow – Proietti for President	15,084	4.70	1
Stefania Proietti	182,394	51.13	1	Greens and Left Alliance	13,750	4.28	1
Stefania Proietti	182,394	51.13	1	Umbria for Public Healthcare	7,819	2.43	–
Stefania Proietti	182,394	51.13	1	Future Umbria	7,402	2.30	–
Stefania Proietti	182,394	51.13	1	Umbrian Civics	5,025	1.56	–
Stefania Proietti	182,394	51.13	1	Total	161,294	50.23	12
Donatella Tesei	164,727	46.17	1	Brothers of Italy	62,419	19.44	3
Donatella Tesei	164,727	46.17	1	Forza Italia	31,128	9.69	2
Donatella Tesei	164,727	46.17	1	League	24,729	7.70	1
Donatella Tesei	164,727	46.17	1	Tesei for President	16,023	4.99	1
Donatella Tesei	164,727	46.17	1	Us Moderates	9,229	2.87	–
Donatella Tesei	164,727	46.17	1	Popular Alternative	6,939	2.16	–
Donatella Tesei	164,727	46.17	1	Union of the Centre	1,432	0.45	–
Donatella Tesei	164,727	46.17	1	Total	151,899	47.30	7
Marco Rizzo	3,946	1.11	–	Sovereign Popular Democracy	1,793	0.56	–
Marco Rizzo	3,946	1.11	–	Reformist Alternative for Rizzo	1,286	0.40	–
Marco Rizzo	3,946	1.11	–	Total	3,079	0.96	–
Martina Leonardi	1,901	0.53	–	Together for a Resistant Umbria	1,556	0.48	–
Moreno Pasquinelli	993	0.28	–	Dissident Front	896	0.28	–
Giuseppe Paolone	866	0.24	–	Force of the People	763	0.24	–
Elia Francesco Fiorini	840	0.24	–	Alternative for Umbria	746	0.23	–
Giuseppe Tritto	837	0.23	–	United Humans Together	729	0.23	–
Fabrizio Pignalberi	253	0.07	–	More Sovereign Italy	109	0.03	–
Fabrizio Pignalberi	253	0.07	–	Fifth Pole for Italy	67	0.02	–
Fabrizio Pignalberi	253	0.07	–	Total	176	0.05	–
Total candidates	356,757	100.00	2	Total parties	321,138	100.00	19
Blank and invalid votes	10,046						
Registered voters/turnout	701,367	52.30					
Source: Ministry of the Interior – Election in Umbria

=== List of previous regional elections ===
- 1970 Umbrian regional election
- 1975 Umbrian regional election
- 1980 Umbrian regional election
- 1985 Umbrian regional election
- 1990 Umbrian regional election
- 1995 Umbrian regional election
- 2000 Umbrian regional election
- 2005 Umbrian regional election
- 2010 Umbrian regional election
- 2015 Umbrian regional election
- 2019 Umbrian regional election
