= Lega Umbria =

- Secretary: Riccardo Augusto Marchetti
- Ideology: Regionalism; Federalism; Populism
- National affiliation: Lega Nord (1991–2020); Lega per Salvini Premier (2020–present)
- Regional Council of Umbria (Note: Including one elect with "Tesei President" list.): 10 / 21

Party flag
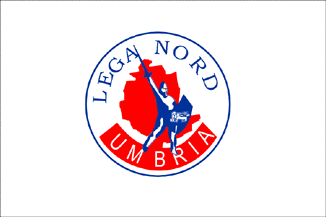

Website
- www.legaumbria.org

Lega Umbria (English: Umbria League), whose complete name is Lega Umbria per Salvini Premier (English: Umbria League for Salvini Premier), is a regionalist political party active in Umbria. The party was a "national" section of Lega Nord (LN) from 1991 to 2020 and has been the regional section of Lega per Salvini Premier (LSP) in Umbria since 2020.

The party is led by secretary Riccardo Augusto Marchetti. One of its leading members, Donatella Tesei, was President of Umbria in 2019–2020.

== Recent history ==
In the 2010 Umbrian regional election the party obtained 4.3% and entered the Regional Council for the first time with a regional councillor, while in 2015 it obtained 14.0% and, despite a reduction of the Council's numbers, two councillors.

In the 2018 general election the party won 20.2% of the vote regionally and in the subsequent municipal election Leonardo Latini, a leghista, was elected mayor of Terni, the region's second largest city.

In 2018 Virginio Caparvi was elected secretary.

In the 2019 European Parliament election the party increased its share to 38.2%.

In the 2019 regional election the party fielded Donatella Tesei as candidate for president. She was handily elected with 57.6% of the vote and a 20pp-lead over its main opponent, Vincenzo Bianconi, who was the candidate of the centre-left coalition, including the Five Star Movement. The LNT and the "Tesei President" list won a combined 40.9% of the vote, of which 37.0% for the LNT. The election ended 49 years of governments led by the Italian Communist Party and its successors, lately the Democratic Party.

In 2023 Riccardo Augusto Marchetti was elected secretary, after Caparvi's decision to step aside.

In the 2024 regional election Tesei failed to be re-elected, being defeated 51.1% to 46.2% by the centre-left candidate Stefania Proietti, and the party was reduced to 7.7% of the vote, plus 5.0% for Tesei's personal list. As a result, the party was left with two assembly members, Tesei and Enrico Melasecche Germini.

== Popular support ==
The party is a tiny one among the national sections of the LN, but it is recently gaining clout.

The electoral results of Lega Nord Umbria in Umbria are shown in the tables below.

1990 regional	1992 general	1994 general	1995 regional	1996 general	1999 European	2000 regional	2001 general	2004 European	2005 regional	2006 general	2008 general	2009 European	2010 regional
0.2	1.1	-	-	1.1	0.3	0.3	-	0.6	-	0.8	1.7	3.6	4.3

2013 general	2014 European	2018 general	2019 European	2019 regional	2022 general	2024 European	2024 regional
0.6	2.5	14.0	20.2	38.2	37.1	7.8	7.7

== Electoral results ==
Legislative Assembly of Umbria

Election year	Votes	%	Seats	+/−
1985	2,103	0.4	0 / 30	–
1990	1,370	0.2	0 / 30	–
1995	–	–	0 / 31	–
2000	1,227 (13th)	0.3	0 / 31	–
2005	–	–	0 / 31	–
2010	17,887 (7th)	4.3	1 / 31	▲1
2015	49,203 (3rd)	14.0	2 / 21	▲1
2019	154,413 (1st)	37.0	9 / 21	▲7
2024	24,729 (4th)	7.7	2 / 21	▼7

== Leadership ==
- Secretary: Alessandro Salvaneschi (1995–1999), Francesco Miroballo (1999–2009), Luca Rodolfo Paolini (commissioner 2009–2012), Gianluca Cirignoni (commissioner 2012–2013), Stefano Candiani (commissioner 2013–2018), Virginio Caparvi (2018–2023, commissioner 2020–2023), Riccardo Augusto Marchetti (2023–present)
- President: unknown (1995–2018), Valerio Mancini (2018–2020)

== Gallery ==
Proposed flag of Umbria by Lega Umbria
