= Marco Squarta =

Italian politician (born 1979)

Marco Squarta MEP
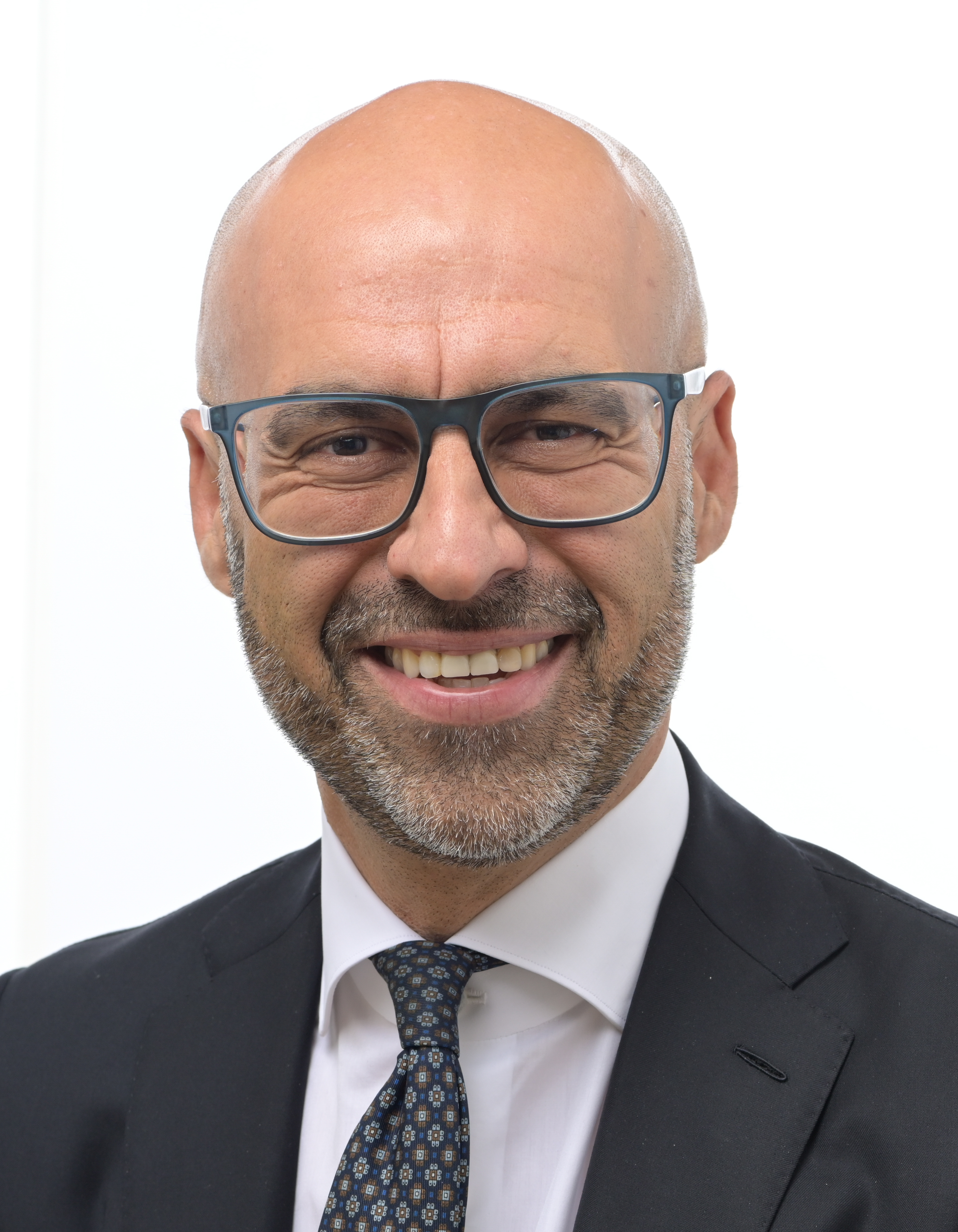

Member of the European Parliament
- Incumbent
- Assumed office 16 July 2024
- Constituency: Central Italy

President of the Legislative Assembly of Umbria
- In office 3 December 2019 – 8 July 2024
- Preceded by: Donatella Porzi
- Succeeded by: Eleonora Pace

Personal details
- Born: 1979 (age 46–47)
- Party: Brothers of Italy
- Other political affiliations: European Conservatives and Reformists Party

Marco Squarta (born 1979) is an Italian politician of Brothers of Italy who was elected member of the European Parliament in 2024. He previously served as president of the Legislative Assembly of Umbria.

== Early life and career ==
Squarta was born in Perugia in 1979. He was a member of the Corecom of Umbria in 2006, and was vice president of the regional Youth Action branch, national director of Youth Action, and vice coordinator of The People of Freedom in the region.

In the 2015 regional election, he was elected to the Legislative Assembly of Umbria. He served as group leader of the Brothers of Italy, and was initially the party's candidate for president of Umbria ahead of the 2019 regional election. Brothers of Italy later agreed to support Lega's Donatella Tesei for the presidency, and Squarta was instead elected president of the legislative assembly.
