= Bastioli =

Bastioli is a surname. Notable people with the surname include:

- Catia Bastioli (born 1957), Italian chemist
- Simone Bastioli, Italian-American microwave engineer
