= List of presidents of Umbria =

There have been ten presidents of Umbria since its proclamation in 1970.

As established by the art. 114, second paragraph of the text, the region of Umbria was established, and the first regional elections took place on 7 June 1970. Until 1993 the presidents were elected by the regional council and following the 1995 reform, the election of the president of the region is by universal and direct suffrage.

Since 2000, all directly elected presidents of Umbria have been women. Umbria has the largest number of mandates won by female presidents out of any region of Italy, with six mandates won by four separate women.

The youngest president at the time of the elections was Pietro Conti, who took office at the age of 41; the oldest was Maria Rita Lorenzetti, who finished her term at the age of 57. Germano Marri was the president who presided over most, elected three times and with the longest mandate, with 10 years, 11 months and 6 days, while Francesco Ghirelli with the shorter mandate.

The Italian Communist Party is the party that has included most of the presidents (three), having governed from 1970 to 1992 with the Italian Socialist Party.

The most durable junta was the first Marini junta, with 5 years, 2 months and 1 day, while the shorter one was the first Ghirelli junta.

== List of presidents ==
President		Term of office		Party	Coalition	Administration	Legislature
Presidents elected by the Regional Council of Umbria (1970–1995)
1	Pietro Conti (1928–1988)	8 June 1970	16 June 1975	PCI	PCI • PSI • PSIUP	Conti I	I (1970)
1	Pietro Conti (1928–1988)	16 June 1975	5 July 1976	PCI	PCI • PSI	Conti II	II (1975)
2	Germano Marri (b. 1932)	5 July 1976	9 June 1980	PCI	PCI • PSI	Marri I	II (1975)
2	Germano Marri (b. 1932)	9 June 1980	13 May 1985	PCI	PCI • PSI	Marri II	III (1980)
2	Germano Marri (b. 1932)	13 May 1985	11 May 1987	PCI	PCI • PSI	Marri III	IV (1985)
3	Francesco Mandarini (1942–2022)	11 May 1987	17 July 1990	PCI; PDS	PCI • PSI	Mandarini I	IV (1985)
3	Francesco Mandarini (1942–2022)	17 July 1990	22 July 1992	PCI; PDS	PCI • PSI	Mandarini II	V (1990)
4	Francesco Ghirelli (b. 1948)	22 July 1992	31 March 1993	PDS	PDS • PSI	Ghirelli	V (1990)
5	Claudio Carnieri (b. 1944)	31 March 1993	5 June 1995	PDS	PDS • PSI	Carnieri	V (1990)
Directly-elected Presidents (since 1995)							V (1990)
6	Bruno Bracalente (b. 1949)	5 June 1995	17 April 2000	PDS; DS	PDS • PRC • PPI	Bracalente	VI (1995)
7	Maria Rita Lorenzetti (b. 1953)	17 April 2000	5 April 2005	DS; PD	DS • PRC • PPI	Lorenzetti I	VII (2000)
7	Maria Rita Lorenzetti (b. 1953)	5 April 2005	16 April 2010	DS; PD	DS • DL • PRC • PdCI	Lorenzetti II	VIII (2005)
8	Catiuscia Marini (b. 1967)	16 April 2010	10 June 2015	PD	PD • IdV • FdS	Marini I	IX (2010)
8	Catiuscia Marini (b. 1967)	10 June 2015	28 May 2019	PD	PD • PSI • SEL	Marini II	X (2015)
9	Donatella Tesei (b. 1958)	11 November 2019	2 December 2024	LN	LN • FdI • FI	Tesei	XI (2019)
10	Stefania Proietti (b. 1975)	2 December 2024	Incumbent	Ind.	PD • M5S • AVS	Proietti	XII (2024)
