= Catiuscia =

Catiuscia is a feminine given name in the Italian language.

== List of people with the given name ==
- Catiuscia Marini (born 1967), Italian politician who served as President of Umbria from 2010 to 2019
- Catiuscia Ricciarelli (born 1946), birth name of Katia Ricciarelli, the Italian opera singer
