= 2024 Italian regional elections =

- February–November 2024

Presidents and regional assemblies of Abruzzo, Basilicata, Emilia-Romagna, Piedmont, Sardinia, and Umbria
- Italian regions by coalition of the ruling president after the elections

A special round of regional elections in Italy took place in 2024 in seven of the country’s twenty regions, including Sardinia (25 February), Abruzzo (10 March), Basilicata (21–22 April), Piedmont (8–9 June), Liguria (27–28 October), Emilia-Romagna and Umbria (17–18 November).

== Overview ==
The regional elections were held early in Liguria and Emilia-Romagna, after their respective presidents had resigned from office.

== Overall results ==
=== Regional councils ===
Alliance	Votes	%	Seats
Centre-right coalition	2,759,671	49.6	128 / 265
Centre-left coalition	2,534,120	45.5	134 / 265
Others	269,006	4.9	3 / 265
Total	5,562,797	100	265 / 265

=== Presidents of the regions ===
Region	Election day	Outgoing			Elected		
Region	Election day	President	Party	Alliance	President	Party	Alliance
Sardinia	25 February	Christian Solinas	PSd'Az	Centre-right	Alessandra Todde	M5S	Centre-left
Abruzzo	10 March	Marco Marsilio	FdI	Centre-right	Marco Marsilio	FdI	Centre-right
Basilicata	21–22 April	Vito Bardi	FI	Centre-right	Vito Bardi	FI	Centre-right
Piedmont	8–9 June	Alberto Cirio	FI	Centre-right	Alberto Cirio	FI	Centre-right
Liguria	27–28 October	Alessandro Piana (acting)	Lega	Centre-right	Marco Bucci	Ind	Centre-right
Umbria	17–18 November	Donatella Tesei	Lega	Centre-right	Stefania Proietti	Ind	Centre-left
Emilia-Romagna	17–18 November	Irene Priolo (acting)	PD	Centre-left	Michele De Pascale	PD	Centre-left

== Summary by region ==
=== Sardinia ===
President				Regional council			
Candidate	Party	Votes	%	Alliance	Votes	%	Seats
Alessandra Todde	M5S	334,160	45.4	Centre-left	293,288	42.5	36
Paolo Truzzu	FdI	331,099	45.0	Centre-right	338,240	49.0	24
Others		70,927	9.6	Others	58,873	8.5	0
Voters: 757,598 — Turnout: 52.3%

=== Abruzzo ===
President				Regional council			
Candidate	Party	Votes	%	Alliance	Votes	%	Seats
Marco Marsilio	FdI	327,660	53.5	Centre-right	316,637	54.7	18
Luciano D'Amico	Ind	284,748	46.5	Centre-left	262,565	45.3	13
Voters: 630,605 — Turnout: 52.2%

=== Basilicata ===
President				Regional council			
Candidate	Party	Votes	%	Alliance	Votes	%	Seats
Vito Bardi	FI	153,088	56.6	Centre-right	150,381	57.5	13
Piero Marrese	PD	113,979	42.2	Centre-left	108,135	41.4	8
Others		3,269	1.2	Others	2,947	1.1	0
Voters: 282,886 — Turnout: 49.8%

=== Piedmont ===
President				Regional council			
Candidate	Party	Votes	%	Alliance	Votes	%	Seats
Alberto Cirio	FI	1,055,752	56.1	Centre-right	936,098	56.6	31
Gianna Pentenero	PD	630,853	33.5	Centre-left	582,399	35.2	17
Sarah Disabato	M5S	144,420	7.7	M5S	99,806	6.0	3
Others		49,756	2.7	Others	35,441	2.2	0
Voters: 2,002,352 — Turnout: 55.3%

=== Liguria ===
President				Regional council			
Candidate	Party	Votes	%	Alliance	Votes	%	Seats
Marco Bucci	Ind	291,089	48.8	Centre-right	271,863	48.3	18
Andrea Orlando	PD	282,671	47.4	Centre-left	269,295	47.9	13
Others		23,072	3.8	Others	21,316	3.8	0
Voters: 616,748 — Turnout: 46.0%

=== Umbria ===
President				Regional council			
Candidate	Party	Votes	%	Alliance	Votes	%	Seats
Stefania Proietti	Ind	182,394	51.1	Centre-left	161,294	50.2	13
Donatella Tesei	Lega	164,727	46.2	Centre-right	151,899	47.3	8
Others		9,636	2.7	Others	7,945	2.5	0
Voters: 366,830 — Turnout: 52.3%

=== Emilia-Romagna ===
President				Regional council			
Candidate	Party	Votes	%	Alliance	Votes	%	Seats
Michele De Pascale	PD	922,150	56.8	Centre-left	857,144	57.4	34
Elena Ugolini	Ind	650,935	40.0	Centre-right	594,553	39.8	16
Others		51,314	3.2	Others	42,678	2.8	0
Voters: 1,660,042 — Turnout: 46.4%
