= 2019 Italian regional elections =

← 2018	February–October 2019	2020 →

Presidents and regional assemblies of Abruzzo, Sardinia, Basilicata, Piedmont and Umbria
- Regions by coalition after the elections

A special round of regional elections in Italy took place in 2019 in five of the country’s twenty regions, including Abruzzo (10 February), Sardinia (24 February), Basilicata (24 March), Piedmont (26 May) and Umbria (27 October).

== Overview ==
The regional elections were held early in Abruzzo and Umbria, after the respective presidents had resigned from office or the regional councils had been dissolved.

== Overall results ==
=== Regional councils ===
Alliance	Votes	%	Seats
Centre-right coalition	2,062,161	52.33	113 / 184
Centre-left coalition	1,255,872	31.87	50 / 184
Five Star Movement	518,446	13.16	21 / 184
Others	89,753	2.28	0 / 184
Total	3,926,232	100	184 / 184

=== Presidents of the regions ===
Region	Election day	Outgoing			Elected		
Region	Election day	President	Party	Alliance	President	Party	Alliance
Abruzzo	10 February	Giovanni Lolli (acting)	PD	Centre-left	Marco Marsilio	FdI	Centre-right
Sardinia	24 February	Francesco Pigliaru	PD	Centre-left	Christian Solinas	PSd'Az	Centre-right
Basilicata	24 March	Marcello Pittella	PD	Centre-left	Vito Bardi	FI	Centre-right
Piedmont	26 May	Sergio Chiamparino	PD	Centre-left	Alberto Cirio	FI	Centre-right
Umbria	27 October	Fabio Paparelli (acting)	PD	Centre-left	Donatella Tesei	Lega	Centre-right

== Summary by region ==
=== Abruzzo ===
President				Regional council			
Candidate	Party	Votes	%	Alliance	Votes	%	Seats
Marco Marsilio	FdI	299,949	48.0	Centre-right	294,879	49.2	18
Giovanni Legnini	PD	195,394	31.3	Centre-left	183,630	30.6	6
Sara Marcozzi	M5S	126,125	20.2	M5S	118,273	19.7	7
Others		2,974	0.5	Others	2,560	0.4	0
Voters: 643,287 — Turnout: 53.1%

=== Sardinia ===
President				Regional council			
Candidate	Party	Votes	%	Alliance	Votes	%	Seats
Christian Solinas	PSd'Az	364,059	47.8	Centre-right	370,354	51.9	36
Massimo Zedda	PP	250,797	32.9	Centre-left	214,660	30.1	18
Francesco Desogus	M5S	85,342	11.2	M5S	69,573	9.7	6
Others		61,365	8.1	Others	59,415	8.3	0
Voters: 790,709 — Turnout: 53.7%

=== Basilicata ===
President				Regional council			
Candidate	Party	Votes	%	Alliance	Votes	%	Seats
Vito Bardi	FI	124,716	42.2	Centre-right	122,548	42.4	13
Carlo Trerotola	Ind	97,866	33.1	Centre-left	96,000	33.2	5
Antonio Mattia	M5S	60,070	20.3	M5S	58,658	20.3	3
Others		12,912	4.4	Others	12,124	4.2	0
Voters: 307,188 — Turnout: 53.5%

=== Piedmont ===
President				Regional council			
Candidate	Party	Votes	%	Alliance	Votes	%	Seats
Alberto Cirio	FI	1,091,814	49.9	Centre-right	1,028,501	53.6	33
Sergio Chiamparino	PD	783,805	35.8	Centre-left	638,802	33.3	13
Giorgio Bertola	M5S	298,086	13.6	M5S	241,014	12.6	5
Others		15,935	0.7	Others	12,259	0.6	0
Voters: 2,290,361 — Turnout: 63.3%

=== Umbria ===
President				Regional council			
Candidate	Party	Votes	%	Alliance	Votes	%	Seats
Donatella Tesei	Lega	255,158	57.6	Centre-right	245,879	58.8	13
Vincenzo Bianconi	Ind	166,179	37.5	Centre-left	153,784	36.8	8
Others		22,006	4.9	Others	18,214	4.4	0
Voters: 455,184 — Turnout: 64.7%
