= Sovereignty (Italy) =

Sovereignty Sovranità
- Leader: Simone Di Stefano
- Founded: February 2015
- Ideology: Italian nationalism Euroscepticism; Anti-immigration
- Political position: Far-right
- National affiliation: CasaPound
- European affiliation: none
- European Parliament group: no MEPs
- Colours: Blue
- Chamber of Deputies: 0 / 630
- Senate: 0 / 315
- European Parliament: 0 / 73

Sovereignty (Italian: Sovranità), was a nationalist political party in Italy. It is a part of the neo-fascist organization CasaPound.

The party supported an alliance with the right-wing parties Northern League and Us with Salvini.

== Electoral results ==
=== Regional Councils ===
Region	Election year	Votes	%	Seats	+/−
Umbria	2015	2,343	0.67	0 / 21	–

== Leadership ==
- Simone di Stefano (2015–present)
