= 2024 Umbrian regional election =

Italian regional election

- 17–18 November 2024

All 21 seats to the Legislative Assembly of Umbria
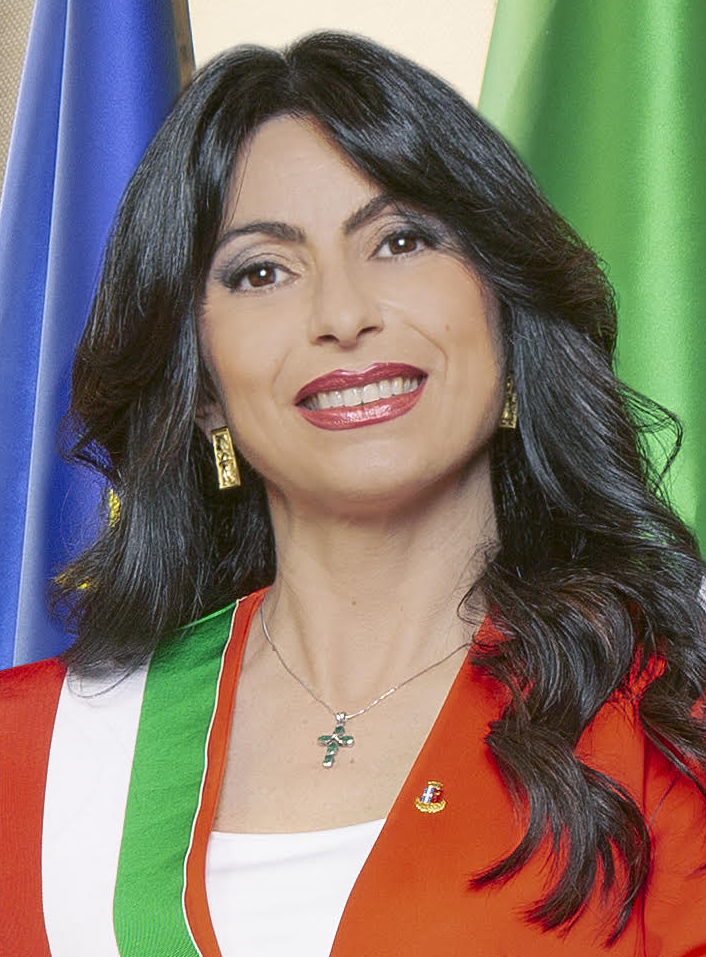

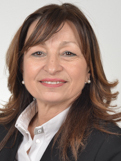
	Majority party	Minority party
Candidate	Stefania Proietti	Donatella Tesei
Party	Independent	League
Alliance	Centre-left	Centre-right
Last election	8 seats, 37.5%	13 seats, 57.6%
Seats won	13	8
Seat change	▲5	▼5
Popular vote	182,394	164,727
Percentage	51.1%	46.2%
Swing	▲13.6%	▼11.4%
President before election
Donatella Tesei
Lega
Elected President
Stefania Proietti
Independent

The 2024 Umbrian regional election took place on 17 and 18 November 2024. The centre-left candidate, mayor of Assisi Stefania Proietti, defeated incumbent centre-right president Donatella Tesei, who ran for re-election, by 5 points.

== Electoral system ==
The candidate who obtains a plurality of votes on a regional level is elected President of Umbria and the winning coalition receives 60% of the seats in the Legislative Assembly, i.e. 12 seats, excluding the seat reserved to the president. All other candidates for president who have not been elected but are linked to lists or coalitions that have elected at least one councillor are automatically elected to the Legislative Assembly.

The allocation of seats by coalitions and lists takes place on a proportional basis using a largest remainder method with open lists, with a 2.5% threshold for all lists and with a maximum limit of 10 seats obtainable for a single list.

Each candidate for president cannot spend more than €100,000, each candidate for regional councillor cannot spend more than €25,000 and each list cannot spend more than €1 multiplied by the number of inhabitants of the Region.

== Parties and candidates ==
Political party or alliance	Constituent lists	Previous result		Candidate
Political party or alliance	Constituent lists	%	Seats	Candidate
Centre-right coalition	League	7.70	1	Donatella Tesei
Centre-right coalition	Brothers of Italy	19.44	3	Donatella Tesei
Centre-right coalition	Forza Italia	9.69	2	Donatella Tesei
Centre-right coalition	Tesei for President	4.	1	Donatella Tesei
Centre-right coalition	Union of the Centre	—N/a	—N/a	Donatella Tesei
Centre-right coalition	Us Moderates	—N/a	—N/a	Donatella Tesei
Centre-right coalition	Popular Alternative	—N/a	—N/a	Donatella Tesei
Centre-left coalition	Democratic Party	30.23	9	Stefania Proietti
Centre-left coalition	Five Star Movement	4.71	1	Stefania Proietti
Centre-left coalition	Greens and Left Alliance (incl. SI, EV, Pos)	4.28	1	Stefania Proietti
Centre-left coalition	Future Umbria (incl. Az, +E, PSI, PRI)	—N/a	—N/a	Stefania Proietti
Centre-left coalition	Umbrian Civics (incl. IV)	—N/a	—N/a	Stefania Proietti
Centre-left coalition	Umbria Tomorrow – Proietti for President	—N/a	—N/a	Stefania Proietti
Centre-left coalition	Umbria for Public Healthcare (incl. PRC)	—N/a	—N/a	Stefania Proietti
Rizzo for President	Sovereign Popular Democracy	0.98	0	Marco Rizzo
Rizzo for President	Reformist Alternative for Rizzo	—N/a	—N/a	Marco Rizzo
Together for a Resistant Umbria (incl. PCI, PaP)		0.82	0	Martina Leonardi
Dissent Front		—N/a	—N/a	Moreno Pasquinelli
Alternative for Umbria		—N/a	—N/a	Elia Francesco Fiorini
Force of the People		—N/a	—N/a	Giuseppe Pino Paolone
United Humans Together		—N/a	—N/a	Giuseppe Tritto
Pignalberi for President	More Sovereign Italy	—N/a	—N/a	Fabrizio Pignalberi
Pignalberi for President	Fifth Pole for Italy	—N/a	—N/a	Fabrizio Pignalberi

== Opinion polls ==
=== Candidates ===
Date	Polling firm/ Client	Sample size	Tesei	Proietti	Rizzo	Others	Undecided	Lead
21–28 Oct 2024	SWG	1,000	45.5–49.5	47.0–51.0	2.5–4.5		25.0	1.5
21–25 Oct 2024	TechnoConsumer	1,000	44.8–49.8	42.9–47.9	1.0–5.0	4.0–20.5	17.1	1.9
17–21 Oct 2024	BiDiMedia	1,000	48.2	47.7	1.3	2.8	20.0	0.5
9–18 Oct 2024	Termometro Politico	1,000	49.1	43.4	5.0	2.5	—N/a	5.7
8–12 Oct 2024	TechnoConsumer	1,000	42.3–47.3	40.7–45.7	1.0–5.0	4.5–20.5	21.3	1.6

=== Political parties ===
Date	Polling firm	Sample size	Centre-right							Centre-left						DSP	Others	Lead
Date	Polling firm	Sample size	FdI	FI	LSP	LCTP	AP	NM	UdC	PD	AVS	UD	M5S	UF	SU	DSP	Others	Lead
21–28 Oct 2024	SWG	1,000	24.5	8.0	6.0	6.0	1.5	1.0	0.5	29.5	6.5	3.5	4.0	2.0	3.0	4.0		5.0
17–21 Oct 2024	BiDiMedia	1,000	26.7	7.0	6.8	4.0	2.9	1.5	—N/a	25.3	5.9	5.8	5.5	2.8	1.7	1.2	2.9	1.4

== Results ==
17–18 November 2024 Umbrian regional election results
Candidates	Votes	%	Seats	Parties	Votes	%	Seats
Stefania Proietti	182,394	51.13	1	Democratic Party	97,089	30.23	9
Stefania Proietti	182,394	51.13	1	Five Star Movement	15,125	4.71	1
Stefania Proietti	182,394	51.13	1	Umbria Tomorrow – Proietti for President	15,084	4.70	1
Stefania Proietti	182,394	51.13	1	Greens and Left Alliance	13,750	4.28	1
Stefania Proietti	182,394	51.13	1	Umbria for Public Healthcare	7,819	2.43	–
Stefania Proietti	182,394	51.13	1	Future Umbria	7,402	2.30	–
Stefania Proietti	182,394	51.13	1	Umbrian Civics	5,025	1.56	–
Stefania Proietti	182,394	51.13	1	Total	161,294	50.23	12
Donatella Tesei	164,727	46.17	1	Brothers of Italy	62,419	19.44	3
Donatella Tesei	164,727	46.17	1	Forza Italia	31,128	9.69	2
Donatella Tesei	164,727	46.17	1	League	24,729	7.70	1
Donatella Tesei	164,727	46.17	1	Tesei for President	16,023	4.99	1
Donatella Tesei	164,727	46.17	1	Us Moderates	9,229	2.87	–
Donatella Tesei	164,727	46.17	1	Popular Alternative	6,939	2.16	–
Donatella Tesei	164,727	46.17	1	Union of the Centre	1,432	0.45	–
Donatella Tesei	164,727	46.17	1	Total	151,899	47.30	7
Marco Rizzo	3,946	1.11	–	Sovereign Popular Democracy	1,793	0.56	–
Marco Rizzo	3,946	1.11	–	Reformist Alternative for Rizzo	1,286	0.40	–
Marco Rizzo	3,946	1.11	–	Total	3,079	0.96	–
Martina Leonardi	1,901	0.53	–	Together for a Resistant Umbria	1,556	0.48	–
Moreno Pasquinelli	993	0.28	–	Dissident Front	896	0.28	–
Giuseppe Paolone	866	0.24	–	Force of the People	763	0.24	–
Elia Francesco Fiorini	840	0.24	–	Alternative for Umbria	746	0.23	–
Giuseppe Tritto	837	0.23	–	United Humans Together	729	0.23	–
Fabrizio Pignalberi	253	0.07	–	More Sovereign Italy	109	0.03	–
Fabrizio Pignalberi	253	0.07	–	Fifth Pole for Italy	67	0.02	–
Fabrizio Pignalberi	253	0.07	–	Total	176	0.05	–
Total candidates	356,757	100.00	2	Total parties	321,138	100.00	19
Blank and invalid votes	10,046						
Registered voters/turnout	701,367	52.30					
Source: Ministry of the Interior – Election in Umbria

Popular vote
PD	30.23%
FdI	19.44%
FI	9.69%
Lega	7.70%
Tesei	4.99%
M5S	4.71%
UD	4.70%
AVS	4.28%
NM	2.87%
UpSP	2.43%
UF	2.30%
AP	2.16%
CU	1.56%
Others	2.94%

President
Proietti	51.13%
Tesei	46.17%
Others	2.70%

=== Results by province and major cities ===
Province	Stefania Proietti	Donatella Tesei	Others
Perugia	139,953 51.80%	123,160 45.59%	7,058 2.61%
Terni	42,441 49.02%	41,567 48.01%	2,578 2.97%

City	Stefania Proietti	Donatella Tesei	Others
Perugia	37,720 53.22%	31,297 44.16%	1,852 2.62%
Terni	19,533 49.79%	18,504 47.17%	1,192 3.04%
Foligno	11,975 53.14%	9,936 44.09%	625 2.77%
Città di Castello	8,353 52.01%	7,261 45.21%	445 2.78%
Spoleto	8,051 57.87%	5,486 39.43%	375 2.70%
Gubbio	7,005 54.75%	5,450 42.59%	340 2.66%
Assisi	6,259 49.27%	6,143 48.36%	301 2.37%
Corciano	5,103 55.69%	3,820 41.69%	240 2.62%
Bastia Umbra	4,378 51.18%	4,005 46.82%	171 2.00%

== See also ==
- 2024 Italian regional elections
- Elections in Umbria
