= 2019 Umbrian regional election =

Regional election in Italy

- 27 October 2019

All 21 seats to the Legislative Assembly of Umbria
- Turnout: 64.69% (▲9.3%)
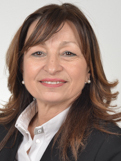

	Majority party	Minority party
Candidate	Donatella Tesei	Vincenzo Bianconi
Party	League	Independent
Alliance	Centre-right	Centre-left–M5S
Last election	6 seats, 39.3%	15 seats, 57.1%
Seats won	13	8
Seat change	▲7	▼7
Popular vote	255,158	166,179
Percentage	57.6%	37.5%
Swing	▲18.3%	▼19.6%
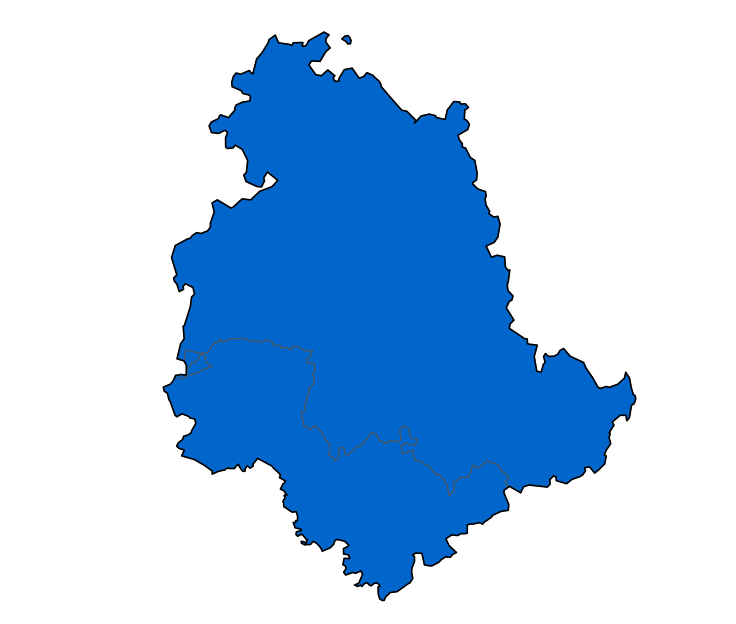
- Winning candidate in each province. Blue identifies a Tesei majority.
President before election
Fabio Paparelli (acting)
PD
Elected President
Donatella Tesei
Lega

The 2019 Umbrian regional election took place on 27 October 2019. The election was for all 20 members of the Legislative Assembly of Umbria as well as for the President of the Region, who is also a member of the Assembly.

== Electoral system ==
The candidate who obtains a plurality of votes on a regional level is elected President of Umbria and the winning coalition receives 60% of the seats in the Legislative Assembly, ie 12 seats, excluding the seat reserved to the President. All other candidates for President who have not been elected but are linked to lists or coalitions that have elected at least one councillor are automatically elected to the Legislative Assembly.

The allocation of seats by coalitions and lists takes place on a proportional basis using a largest remainder method with open lists, with a 2.5% threshold for all lists and with a maximum limit of 10 seats obtainable for a single list.

Each candidate for President cannot spend more than €100,000, each candidate for regional councillor cannot spend more than €25,000 and each list cannot spend more than €1 multiplied by the number of inhabitants of the Region.

== Background ==
In April 2019 the regional secretary of the Democratic Party Gianpiero Bocci and the regional health councillor Luca Barberini, together with Emilio Duca and Maurizio Valorosi, general manager and administrative director of the Perugia hospital, were arrested following an investigation into recruitment competitions in 2018 when Bocci was undersecretary of the Ministry of the Interior. They were committed to stand trial on charges of abuse of office, disclosure of official secrecy, aiding and false ideology and material, for having communicated to some recommended candidates the questions that would have been present in the recruitment competitions. Catiuscia Marini, President of the Umbria Region, was committed to stand trial on charges of false ideology and material, abuse of office and disclosure of official secrets. A total of 35 people were investigated.

Both Matteo Salvini and Luigi Di Maio demanded the resignation of the President and requested an early election, organizing rallies to Perugia right after the arrests, while the new secretary of the Democratic Party, Nicola Zingaretti, said that the prosecutors must ascertain responsibilities for the crime committed by suspects. Later on, Carlo Calenda, member of the Democratic Party, requested her resignation, while the secretary Zingaretti said she "must do what is best for Umbria", viewed by the newspapers as an invite to resign. President Catiuscia Marini initially announced she would resign, but a month later she voted a motion in the Legislative Assembly that asked her not to resign, causing much controversy in the party, and eventually, she officially resigned, leaving the post to her deputy president Fabio Paparelli.

== Candidates ==
=== Centre-left ===
The Democratic Party, following the scandal in the Region, decided they wanted to support an independent candidate. Among the civic lists with which they initially collaborated to draft the program, there were the Movement of the ideas and the act, promoted by the president of the Alliance of the Italian Cooperatives Umbria Andrea Fora and the professor of the University of Perugia Luca Ferrucci, Mario Stirati, mayor of Gubbio, and finally Umbria of the Territories of Stefania Proietti, mayor of Assisi and the councillor of Todi Floriano Pizzichini. Andrea Fora finally decided to formalize his availability as a candidate for president for the centre-left coalition, supported by cardinal Bassetti, the Democratic Party and other minor lists like DemoS, creating some discontent on the other lists for his self candidature, choosing to run as a brand new coalition called Civic Green and Social Umbria, joined by Umbria of the Territories, the Italian Socialist Party, the Movement of the ideas and the act, Green Europe and The Other Umbria, a list promoted by Communist Refoundation and Italian Left. Possible candidates for the Presidency from the alternative coalition were Luciano Bacchetta, president of the Province of Terni, Marco Sciorini, coordinator of Terni of Umbria of the Territories, and Floriano Pizzichini.

=== Centre-right ===
As at the 2019 Piedmontese regional election, the centre-right for months did not find an agreement on the candidate President. Matteo Salvini, for the League, immediately after the health scandal, proposed for the presidency Donatella Tesei, senator of the League and former mayor of Montefalco, also supported by the new party Cambiamo! by Giovanni Toti, while Fratelli d'Italia insisted on the name of Marco Squarta, group leader of the party at the regional council of Umbria. A third candidacy, Andrea Romiti, mayor of Perugia, was put forward by the former assessor of Perugia Francesco Calabrese, promoting the list Project Umbria, but was immediately rejected by the three parties, specifying that there would be no more than four lists in support of the candidate President. In early September, both Forza Italia and FdI supported Tesei's candidacy, but both parties wanted a deputy president of their own (Marco Squarta for FdI, Roberto Morroni for FI). Another problem was FI's veto to the list of Cambiamo into the coalition, but Matteo Salvini asked for the centre-right unity, leaving the decision to Tesei.

=== Five Star Movement ===
The Five Star Movement didn't hold the online primaries for the election of the presidential candidate. In July, the former candidate for President of the Umbria Region at the previous elections and outgoing regional councillor for Umbria, Andrea Liberati, announced that he will not stand as presidential candidate for the M5S. The candidates for the presidency of the Umbria region for the M5S were the former MEP Laura Agea, from Città di Castello, the doctor Gino Di Manici Proietti, candidate in the political elections in 2018 in the single-member constituency of Umbria - 02 and the outgoing regional councillor Maria Grazia Carbonari. The latter officially announced his availability for the office. Finally, the online primaries took place on 19 September, but the members voted only for the candidates in the list and not for the candidates for the presidency.

In the days of the formation of the new government between PD and M5S, both the PD commissioner in Umbria Walter Verini and the independent candidate for the centre-left Andrea Fora showed interest in an electoral alliance between PD and M5S in the regional elections in Umbria, but some umbrian members of the Chamber of the Deputies for the M5S countered that an electoral alliance between PD and M5S would be "premature". Finally, after the new Conte cabinet, Dario Franceschini and the PD secretary Nicola Zingaretti proposed an alliance to the M5S but Luigi Di Maio initially refused, but finally he proposed a "civic pact" for Umbria, choosing an independent president as a candidate and independent regional assessors as well. The proposal was welcome by both the coalition led by the Democratic Party and the coalition of the civic left. The possible candidates were the entrepreneur and stylist Brunello Cucinelli, who refused, and the CEO of Novamont, Catia Bastioli. The Five Star Movement meanwhile called for another vote on 20 September on their online platform to decide whether to take part of the "civic pact" proposed by Di Maio itself.

=== Other lists ===
Among the other candidates, Claudio Ricci, former candidate for president of the centre-right in the regional election of 2015 and outgoing regional councillor for Umbria, announced his candidacy as an independent candidate with three civic lists, while the Communist Party announced the candidacy of the former member of the CGIL trade union Rossano Rubicondi, Power to the People announced they would run with their own presidential candidate, Emiliano Camuzzi, a trade unionist, and finally the former general Antonio Pappalardo declared he will run for the Orange Vests, inspired by the Yellow vests movement in France.

== Parties and candidates ==
Political party or alliance	Constituent lists	Previous result		Candidate
Political party or alliance	Constituent lists	Votes (%)	Seats	Candidate
Centre-left–M5S	Democratic Party (PD)	35.8	11	Vincenzo Bianconi
Centre-left–M5S	Five Star Movement (M5S)	14.6	1	Vincenzo Bianconi
Centre-left–M5S	Green Civic Left (incl. LS, Art.1)	—N/a	—N/a	Vincenzo Bianconi
Centre-left–M5S	Green Europe (EV)	—N/a	—N/a	Vincenzo Bianconi
Centre-left–M5S	Bianconi for Umbria (incl. DemoS, PSI)	—N/a	—N/a	Vincenzo Bianconi
Centre-right coalition	League (Lega)	14.0	2	Donatella Tesei
Centre-right coalition	Forza Italia (FI)	8.5	1	Donatella Tesei
Centre-right coalition	Brothers of Italy (FdI)	6.2	1	Donatella Tesei
Centre-right coalition	Civic Umbria (incl. NPSI)	—N/a	—N/a	Donatella Tesei
Centre-right coalition	Tesei for Umbria (incl. IdeA)	—N/a	—N/a	Donatella Tesei
Ricci for President	Ricci for President	4.5	1	Claudio Ricci
Ricci for President	Civic Italy	—N/a	—N/a	Claudio Ricci
Ricci for President	Umbria Proposal	—N/a	—N/a	Claudio Ricci
Camuzzi for President	Power to the People (PaP)	—N/a	—N/a	Emiliano Camuzzi
Camuzzi for President	Italian Communist Party (PCI)	—N/a	—N/a	Emiliano Camuzzi
Communist Party (PC)		—N/a	—N/a	Rossano Rubicondi
Reconquer Italy (RI)		—N/a	—N/a	Martina Carletti
Orange Vests		—N/a	—N/a	Antonio Pappalardo
Party of Good Manners (PBM)		—N/a	—N/a	Giuseppe Cirillo

== Opinion polls ==
=== Presidential candidates ===
Exit poll

Date	Polling firm	Sample size	Bianconi	Tesei	Ricci	Camuzzi	Rubicondi	Others	Undecided	Lead
27 Oct 2019	Consorzio Opinio	–	35.5–39.5	56.5–60.5	1.5–3.5	—N/a	—N/a	1.5	—N/a	21.0
10 Oct 2019	Noto	–	41.0	49.0	6.5	—N/a	—N/a	3.5	29.0	8.0
4–8 Oct 2019	Ixè	1,000	45.0	44.5	6.5	—N/a	—N/a	4.0	34.0	0.5
1–7 Oct 2019	SWG	1,000	43.0	52.0	4.0	1.0	1.0	1.0	–	8.0
25–27 Sep 2019	Quorum–YouTrend	1,000	43.1	47.2	6.2	1.7	1.9	–	14.8	4.1

=== Parties ===
Date	Polling firm	Sample size	Centre-left – M5S			Centre-right				Ricci	PC	Camuzzi	Others	Lead
Date	Polling firm	Sample size	PD	M5S	Others	Lega	FI	FdI	Others	Ricci	PC	Camuzzi	Others	Lead
1–7 Oct 2019	SWG	1,000	22.5	14.0	5.5	38.5	4.5	6.5	2.5	3.0	1.0	2.0	1.0	16.0
25–27 Sep 2019	Quorum–YouTrend	1,000	30.2	10.0	2.9	34.4	3.8	6.7	2.9	4.6	1.7	1.7	2.1	4.2
16 Sep 2019	Piepoli	–	26.0	19.0	–	34.0	6.0	6.0	1.5	—N/a	—N/a	—N/a	7.5	8.0
23 Nov 2015	Election results	–	35.8	14.6	7.5	14.0	8.5	6.2	5.3	4.5	–	–	3.6	21.2

== Results ==
Donatella Tesei, backed by the centre-right coalition composed of Salvini's League, far-right Brothers of Italy and Berlusconi’s Forza Italia, was elected governor with 57.6% of the vote. The candidate for the coalition composed of the centre-left (led by the Democratic Party) and the Five Star Movement lost to the centre-right by more than 20 percent points. Umbria marks the eighth straight victory for the centre-right in regional ballots since the general election of March 2018.

27 October 2019 Umbrian regional election results
Candidates	Votes	%	Seats	Parties	Votes	%	Seats
Donatella Tesei	255,158	57.55	1	League	154,413	36.95	8
Donatella Tesei	255,158	57.55	1	Brothers of Italy	43,443	10.40	2
Donatella Tesei	255,158	57.55	1	Forza Italia	22,991	5.50	1
Donatella Tesei	255,158	57.55	1	Tesei for Umbria	16,424	3.93	1
Donatella Tesei	255,158	57.55	1	Civic Umbria	8,608	2.06	–
Donatella Tesei	255,158	57.55	1	Total	245,879	58.84	12
Vincenzo Bianconi	166,179	37.48	1	Democratic Party	93,296	22.33	5
Vincenzo Bianconi	166,179	37.48	1	Five Star Movement	30,953	7.41	1
Vincenzo Bianconi	166,179	37.48	1	Bianconi for President	16,833	4.03	1
Vincenzo Bianconi	166,179	37.48	1	Green Civic Left	6,727	1.61	–
Vincenzo Bianconi	166,179	37.48	1	Green Europe	5,975	1.43	–
Vincenzo Bianconi	166,179	37.48	1	Total	153,784	36.80	7
Claudio Ricci	11,718	2.64	–	Ricci for President	5,261	1.26	–
Claudio Ricci	11,718	2.64	–	Civic Italy	2,175	0.52	–
Claudio Ricci	11,718	2.64	–	Umbria Proposal	1,475	0.35	–
Claudio Ricci	11,718	2.64	–	Total	8,911	2.13	–
Rossano Rubicondi	4,484	1.01	–	Communist Party	4,108	0.98	–
Emiliano Camuzzi	3,846	0.87	–	Italian Communist Party	2,098	0.50	–
Emiliano Camuzzi	3,846	0.87	–	Power to the People	1,345	0.32	–
Emiliano Camuzzi	3,846	0.87	–	Total	3,443	0.82	–
Martina Carletti	910	0.21	–	Reconquer Italy	808	0.19	–
Antonio Pappalardo	587	0.13	–	Orange Vests	524	0.13	–
Giuseppe Cirillo	461	0.10	–	Party of Good Manners	420	0.10	–
Blank and invalid votes	11,841	2.60	–		-	-	-
Total candidates	443,343	100.00	2	Total parties	417,877	100.00	19
Registered voters/turnout	703,595	64.69	–		-	-	-
Source: Ministry of the Interior – Results

Popular vote
Lega	36.95%
PD	22.33%
FdI	10.40%
M5S	7.41%
FI	5.50%
Bianconi List	4.03%
Tesei List	3.93%
UC	2.06%
SVC	1.61%
EV	1.43%
Ricci List	1.26%
Others	3.09%

President
Tesei	57.55%
Bianconi	37.48%
Ricci	2.64%
Rubicondi	1.01%
Camuzzi	0.87%
Carletti	0.21%
Pappalardo	0.13%
Cirillo	0.10%

=== Voter turnout ===
Region	Time		
Region	12:00	19:00	23:00
Umbria	19.55%	52.78%	64.69%
Province	Time		
Province	12:00	19:00	23:00
Perugia	19.68%	53.08%	65.02%
Terni	19.19%	51.95%	63.74%
Source: Ministry of the Interior – Turnout

== See also ==
- 2019 Italian regional elections
