= Virginio Caparvi =

Italian politician (born 1982)

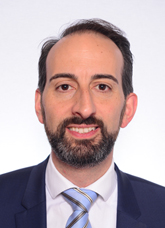
- Caparvi in 2022

Member of the Chamber of Deputies
- Incumbent
- Assumed office 23 March 2018
- Constituency: Umbria – 01 (2018–2022); Umbria – 02 (2022–present)

Personal details
- Born: 25 September 1982 (age 43)
- Party: Lega

Virginio Caparvi (born 25 September 1982) is an Italian politician serving as a member of the Chamber of Deputies since 2018. He has served as mayor of Nocera Umbra since 2021.

== Biography ==
A freelance web developer with a bachelor’s degree in computer science, he is a member of the Northern League and was elected to the municipal council of Nocera Umbra in 2011, subsequently being appointed councilor for the budget in the center-right administration led by Giovanni Bontempi. In the 2013 general election, he ran for the Chamber of Deputies in the Umbria district as a candidate for the Northern League, but was not elected.

In 2015, he was appointed deputy secretary of the Northern League for Umbria by Senator Stefano Candiani. Re-elected as a city councilor of Nocera Umbra in 2016 with 277 votes, he was appointed councilor for culture, tourism, social affairs, and school services, with the titles of deputy mayor and vice president of the City Council. That same year, he ran for provincial councilor of Perugia on the center-right Provincia Libera ticket but was not elected.

In the 2018 general election, he was elected to the Chamber of Deputies in the Umbria - 01 multi-member constituency on the Lega ticket, and was subsequently appointed to the Labor Committee. On May 27, 2018, during the League’s first regional congress in Umbria, he was elected regional secretary of the League, succeeding Senator Stefano Candiani.

In the 2021 local elections, he ran for mayor of Nocera Umbra on the center-right civic list Futura Nocera and was elected with 58.34% of the vote.

He ran again in the 2022 general election in the Umbria - 02 (Perugia) single-member district as the center-right candidate representing the League, and was re-elected with 44.71% of the vote, defeating Stefano Vinti of the center-left (27.50%) and Alessandra Ruffini of the Five Star Movement (12.54%).
