= Riccardo Augusto Marchetti =

Italian politician (born 1987)

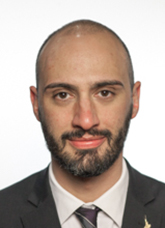
- Marchetti in 2018

Member of the Chamber of Deputies
- Incumbent
- Assumed office 23 March 2018
- Constituency: Umbria – 02 (2018–2022); Marche – 01 (2022–present)

Personal details
- Born: 8 May 1987 (age 38)
- Party: Lega

Riccardo Augusto Marchetti (born 8 May 1987) is an Italian politician serving as a member of the Chamber of Deputies since 2018. He has served as secretary of Lega Umbria since 2023.
