= Fiammetta Modena =

Italian politician

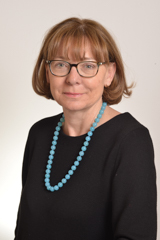
Fiammetta Modena in 2018.

Fiammetta Modena (born 20 June 1965) is an Italian politician from Forza Italia. She has been a member of the Italian Senate from 2018 to 2022.
