= Simone Bastioli =

Italian-American microwave engineer

- Education: University of Perugia
- Occupation: Microwave engineer

Simone Bastioli is an Italian-American microwave engineer. He was named a fellow of the Institute of Electrical and Electronics Engineers, "for his contributions to microwave filter concepts and topologies".
