= 1995 Umbrian regional election =

← 1990	April 23, 1995	2000 →

All 30 seats to the Regional Council of Umbria
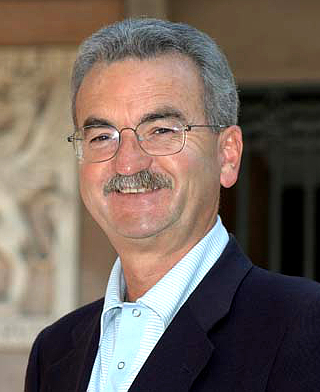

	Majority party	Minority party
Leader	Bruno Bracalente	Riccardo Pongelli
Party	PDS	Forza Italia
Alliance	Centre-left	Centre-right
Seats won	18	12
Popular vote	331,349	215,570
Percentage	59.9%	39.9%
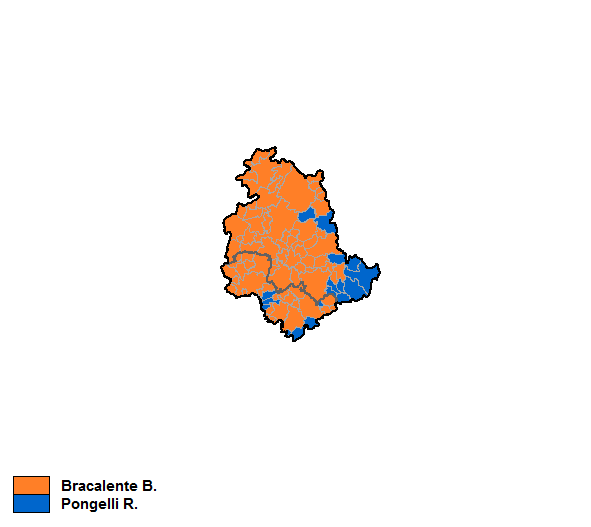
President of Umbria before election
Carlo Carnieri
PDS
President of Umbria
Bruno Bracalente
PDS

The Umbrian regional election of 1995 took place on 23 April 1995.

For the first time the President of the Region was directly elected by the people, although the election was not yet binding and the President-elect could have been replaced during the term.

Bruno Bracalente (Democratic Party of the Left) was elected President of the Region, defeating Riccardo Pongelli (Forza Italia) by a landslide.

== Results ==
Candidates	votes	votes (%)	seats reg. list	seats prov. lists
Bruno Bracalente	331,349	59.94	3	15
Democratic Party of the Left	199,779	38.58	→	10
Communist Refoundation Party	56,894	10.99	→	3
Together for Umbria	21,458	4.14	→	1
Pact of Democrats	19,874	3.84	→	1
Labour Federation	10,451	2.02	→	-
Federation of the Greens	9,884	1.91	→	-
Union of Progressives	6,103	1.18	→	-
Riccardo Pongelli	215,570	39.00	-	12
Forza Italia – The People's Pole	93,841	18.12	→	7
National Alliance–others	84,065	16.23	→	5
Christian Democratic Centre	11,124	2.15	→	-
Mauro Fonzo	5,867	1.06	-	-
Pannella List	4,368	0.84	→	-
Total	552,786	100.00	3	27

Source: Ministry of the Interior
