= Catia Bastioli =

Italian chemist and researcher

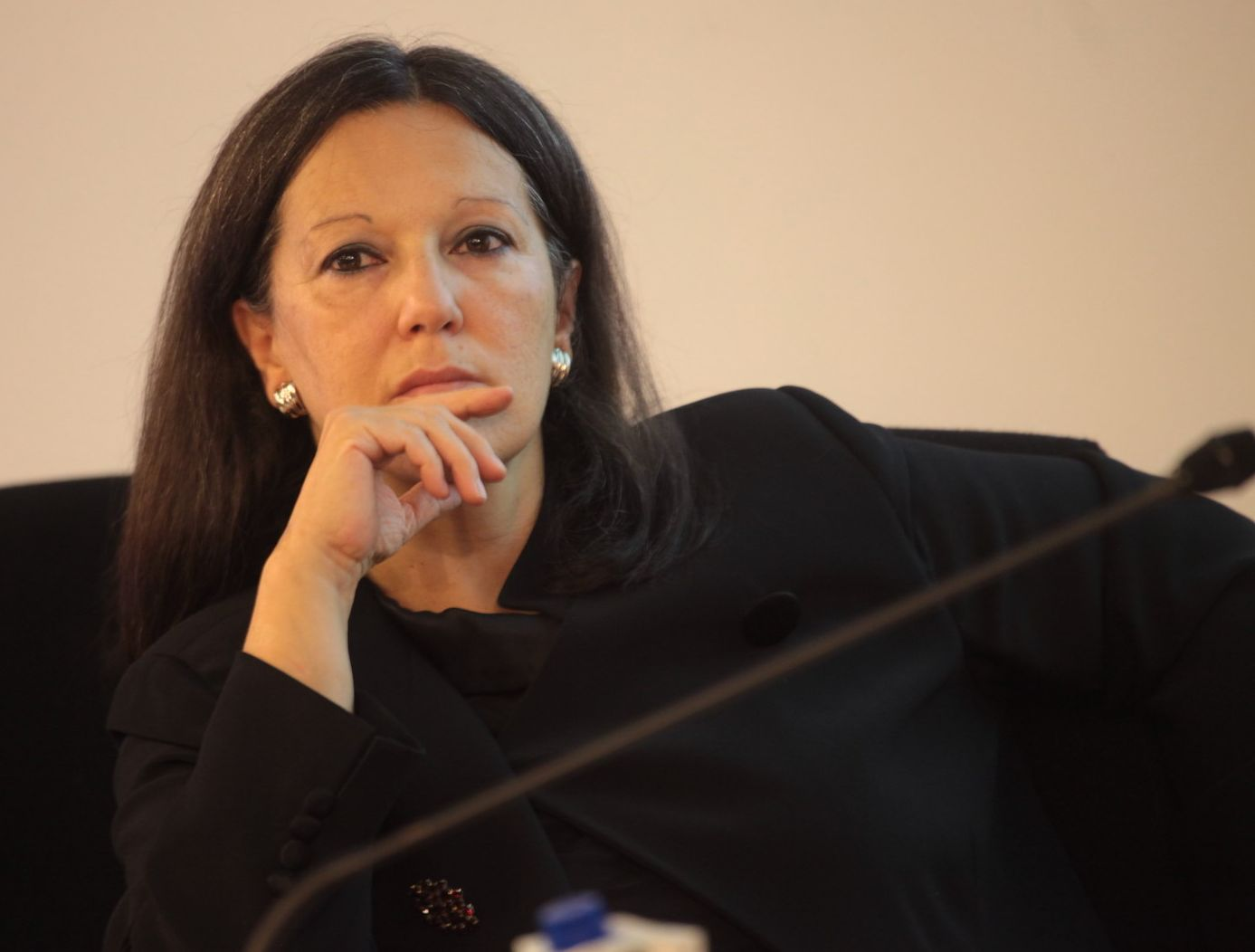
- Born: October 3, 1957 (age 68); Foligno, Italy
- Education: Universita di Perugia
- Employer: Novamont

Catia Bastioli (born 1957) is an Italian researcher, chemist, and entrepreneur. Born in Foligno, she was always interested in chemistry and the natural world. Bastioli went on to attend the Business Management School at Bocconi University and get a degree in chemistry from the University of Perugia. She started her career as a researcher for the largest research group in Italy, Montedison, where she used her chemistry expertise to develop bioplastics with waste and agricultural raw materials. At Montedison, she helped to found a research center that later became Novamont. With this transition to Novemont, Bastioli began focusing on experimenting with eco-friendly materials and bioplastics. Bastioli is CEO of Novamont, as well as President of Terna Spa of the Kyoto Club Association and a member of the Board of Directors of Fondazione Cariplo. She also was the CEO of Matrìca, a joint venture between Novamont and Versalis.

== Career ==
With her experience in bio plastics and renewable raw materials, Bastioli is an investor and inventor. With a passion for sustainability and the environment, she noticed a problem that modern day innovations face when it comes to having an impact on the environment. With this problem in mind, she had a goal of developing a systematic approach to adding value to an innovative product while also decreasing its environmental harm. With the belief that science and technology can improve lives, she experimented with the development of different bio plastics. Bastioli has gone on to publish over 40 papers and be listed as the inventor of over 150 patents.

Bastioli is the prime inventor of around 80 patent families in both synthetic and natural polymers, as well as transformation processes of renewable raw materials. In fact, the European Patent Office and the European Commission awarded her as "European Inventor of the Year 2007" for her inventions in starch-based bioplastics. She was also declared Person of the Year by Bioplastic News in 2017 for her work. Through her innovations and awards, she remains committed to solving real problems faced by society. In 2025, Bastioli was elected to the US National Academy of Engineering.

== Impact ==
Bastioli's work in the bioplastic field has contributed to advances in sustainable materials. Her focus has always been on the unmet need of modern innovations negatively affecting the environment. This is highlighted with her work on the development of Master-Bi, a family of bioplastic polymers created from plant-based feedstocks, has uses not only on replacing conventional plastic, but also in preserving natural resources and reducing environmental impacts. With an eco-design approach, Mater-Bi also addresses challenges in waste management, and the environment of agricultural dispersion. This is currently aimed at solving soil degradation and greenhouse gas emission problems by creating more fertile soil through organic matter and decarbonizing the atmosphere. With the use of this innovative product, pollution due to traditional plastics can be reduced, and these challenges can be partially addressed. With the combination of entrepreneurship and chemistry, Catia Bastioli has established herself as an influential figure in the bioplastic field.
