= Stefano Candiani =

Italian politician (born 1971)

Member of the Chamber of Deputies
- Constituency: Lombardia 2

Personal details
- Born: December 11, 1971 (age 54) Busto Arsizio
- Party: Lega Nord

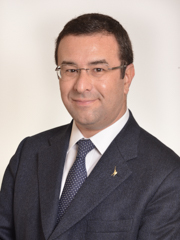
Portrait of Candiani

Stefano Candiani is an Italian politician and member of the Chamber of Deputies.
