= 2010 Umbrian regional election =

- March 28–29, 2010

All 30 seats to the Regional Council of Umbria
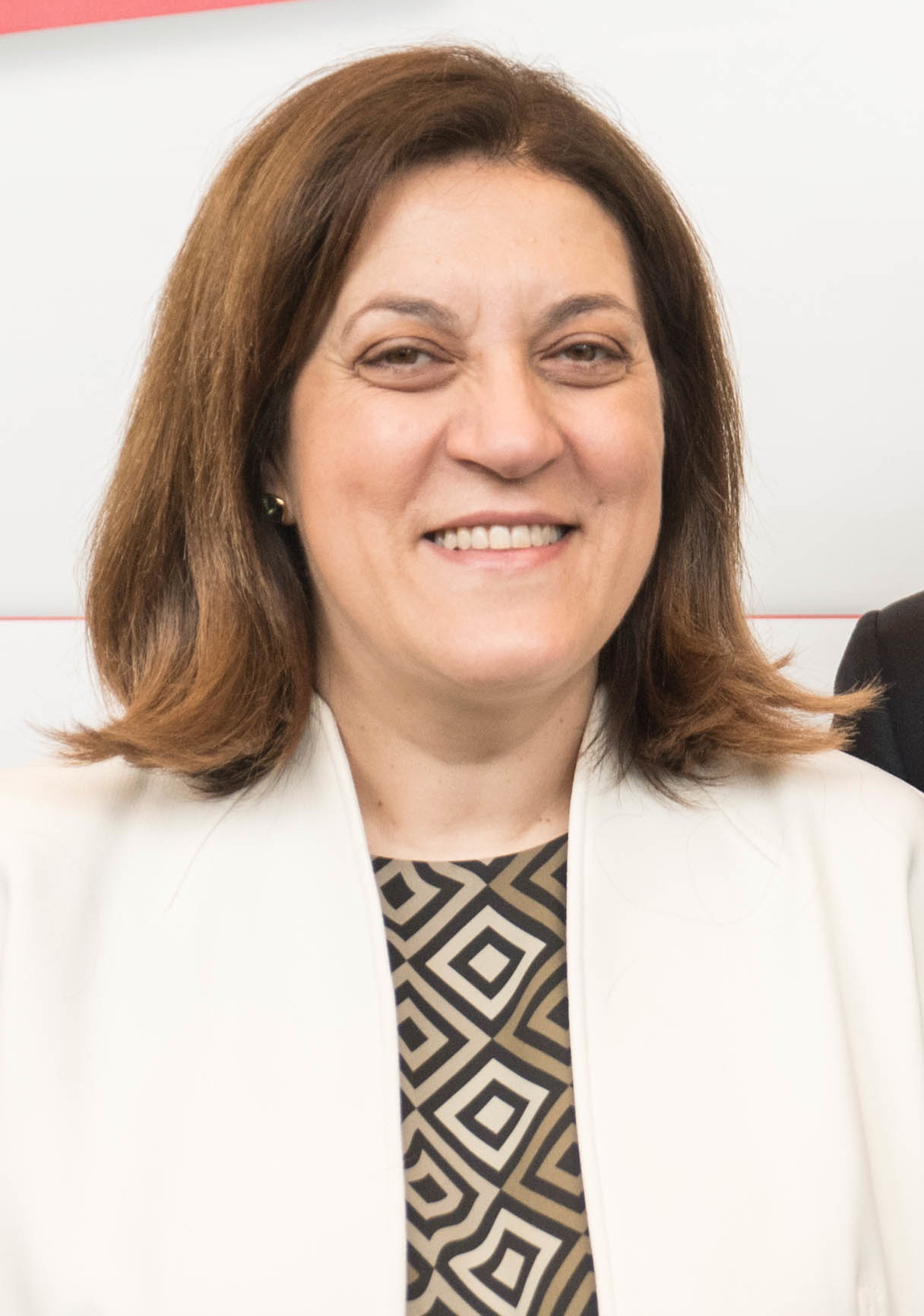

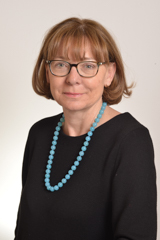
	Majority party	Minority party
Leader	Catiuscia Marini	Fiammetta Modena
Party	Democratic Party	People of Freedom
Alliance	Centre-left	Centre-right
Last election	19 seats, 63.0%	11 seats, 33.7%
Seats won	19	10
Seat change	Steady	▼1
Popular vote	257,458	169,568
Percentage	57.2%	37.7%
Swing	▼5.8%	▲4.0%
President of Umbria before election
Maria Rita Lorenzetti
Democratic Party
President of Umbria
Catiuscia Marini
Democratic Party

The Umbrian regional election of 2010 took place on 28–29 March 2010.

The three main candidates were Catiuscia Marini of the Democratic Party, Fiammetta Modena of The People of Freedom and Paola Binetti of the Union of the Centre.

Marini won by a landslide, retaining the region for the centre-left.

== Results ==
Candidates & parties	votes	votes (%)	seats reg. list	seats prov. lists
Catiuscia Marini	257,458	57.24	6	13
Democratic Party	149,219	36.17	→	9
Italy of Values	34,393	8.34	→	1
Federation of the Left	28,331	6.87	→	2
Socialists and Reformists	17,167	4.16	→	1
Left Ecology Freedom	13,980	3.39	→	-
Fiammetta Modena	169,568	37.70	1	9
The People of Freedom	133,531	32.36	→	8
Northern League Umbria	17,887	4.34	→	1
Paola Binetti	22,756	5.06	1	-
Union of the Centre	18,072	4.38	→	-
Total	449,782	100.00	11	19

Source: Ministry of the Interior – Historical Archive of Elections
