= 2000 Umbrian regional election =

General election in the Italian province of Umbria

- 16 April 2000

All 30 seats to the Regional Council of Umbria
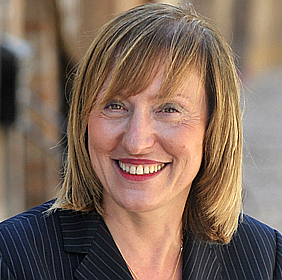

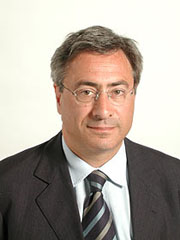
	Majority party	Minority party
Leader	Maria Rita Lorenzetti	Maurizio Ronconi
Party	DS	CCD
Alliance	The Olive Tree	Pole for Freedoms
Last election	18 seats, 59.9%	12 seats, 39.9%
Seats won	20	10
Seat change	▲2	▼1
Popular vote	286,588	199,215
Percentage	54.6%	39.1%
Swing	▼5.3%	▼0.8%
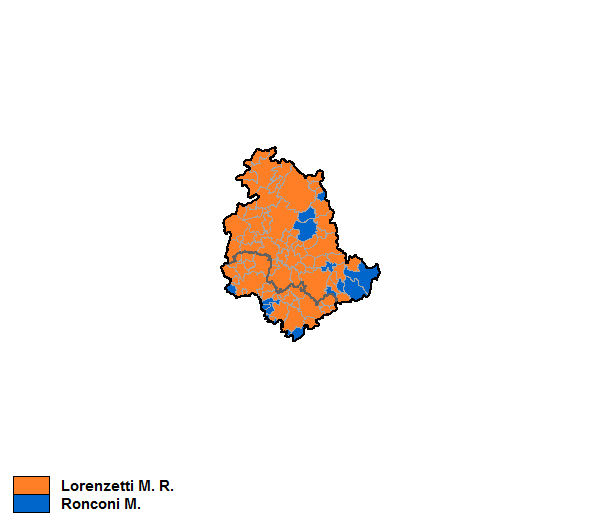
President before election
Bruno Bracalente
DS
Elected President
Maria Rita Lorenzetti
DS

The Umbrian regional election of 2000 took place on 16 April 2000.

Maria Rita Lorenzetti (Democrats of the Left) was elected President of Umbria, defeating Maurizio Ronconi (Christian Democratic Centre) by a landslide.

== Results ==
Candidates & parties	votes	votes (%)	seats reg. list	seats prov. lists
Maria Rita Lorenzetti	286,588	56.41	6	14
Democrats of the Left	154,461	32.05	→	8
Communist Refoundation Party	36,194	7.51	→	2
PPI–PRI	24,863	5.16	→	1
SDI–UDEUR–UpR	23,855	4.95	→	1
Party of Italian Communists	17,021	3.53	→	1
The Democrats	15,750	3.27	→	1
Federation of the Greens	7,050	1.46	→	0
Maurizio Ronconi	199,215	39.21	1	9
Forza Italia	89,475	18.56	→	4
National Alliance	74,510	15.46	→	4
CCD–CDU	22,655	4.70	→	1
Lega Nord Marche	1,227	0.25	→	0
Fulvio Maiorca	12,232	2.41	-	-
Tricolour Flame	7,078	1.47	→	0
Elisabetta Chiacchella	10,034	1.97	-	-
Bonino List	7,865	1.63	→	0
Total	508,069	100.00	7	23

Source: Ministry of the Interior
