= 1975 Umbrian regional election =

The Umbrian regional election of 1975 took place on 15 June 1975.

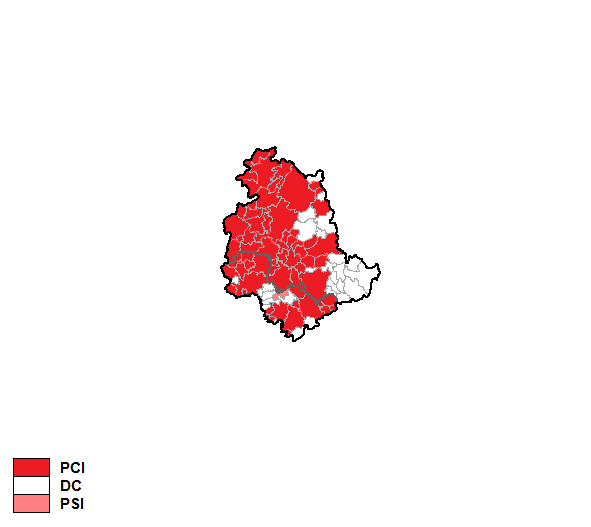
Largest party by municipality

== Events ==
The Italian Communist Party was by far the largest party, gaining almost twice the votes of Christian Democracy. After the election, Pietro Conti, the incumbent Communist President, continued to govern the Region at the head of a left-wing coalition with the Italian Socialist Party (Popular Democratic Front). In 1976 Conti was replaced by Germano Marri, a Communist too.

== Results ==
Parties	votes	votes (%)	seats
Italian Communist Party	257,606	46.1	14
Christian Democracy	154,165	27.6	9
Italian Socialist Party	77,472	13.9	4
Italian Social Movement	31,512	5.6	1
Italian Democratic Socialist Party	13,580	2.4	1
Italian Republican Party	13,451	2.4	1
Proletarian Democracy	6,220	1.1	-
Italian Liberal Party	4,389	0.8	-
Total	558,395	100.0	30

Source: Ministry of the Interior
