= Pietro Conti =

Italian politician

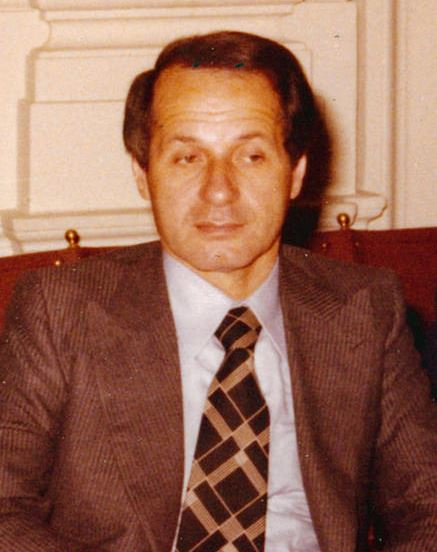

1st President of Umbria
- In office 8 June 1970 – 5 July 1976
- Preceded by: Office established
- Succeeded by: Germano Marri

Personal details
- Born: 8 September 1928 Spoleto, Italy
- Died: 7 September 1988 (aged 59)

Pietro Conti was an Italian politician who served as 1st President of Umbria.

== Personal life ==
He was born on 8 September 1928 in Spoleto and died on 7 September 1988.

== Honors ==
- Regional Museum of Emigration Pietro Conti is dedicated to him
- Pietro Conti Prize is named after him
