= 1970 Umbrian regional election =

The Umbrian regional election of 1970 took place on 7–8 June 1970.

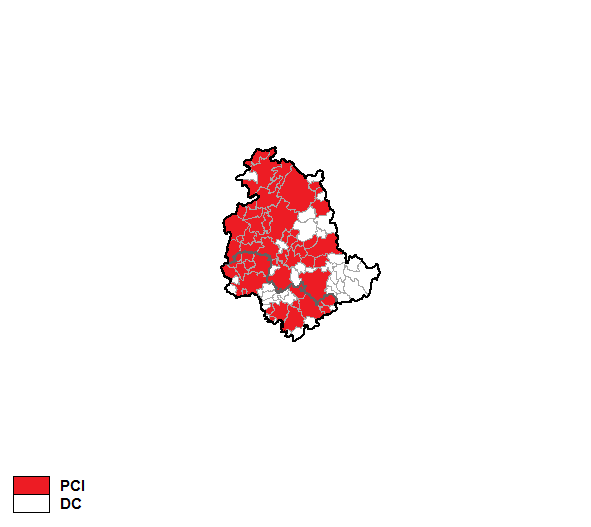
Largest party by municipality

== Events ==
The Italian Communist Party was by far the largest party. After the election, Communist Pietro Conti formed a left-wing coalition government with the Italian Socialist Party and the Italian Socialist Party of Proletarian Unity (Popular Democratic Front).

== Results ==
Parties	votes	votes (%)	seats
Italian Communist Party	215,174	41.8	13
Christian Democracy	154,878	30.1	9
Italian Socialist Party	48,833	9.5	3
Italian Social Movement	27,838	5.4	2
Italian Socialist Party of Proletarian Unity	23,663	4.6	1
Unitary Socialist Party	22,454	4.4	1
Italian Republican Party	12,182	2.4	1
Italian Liberal Party	9,512	1.9	-
Total	514,534	100.0	30

Source: Ministry of the Interior
