= 2005 Umbrian regional election =

- April 3–4, 2005

All 30 seats to the Regional Council of Umbria
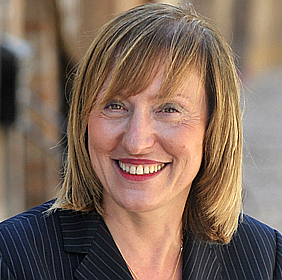

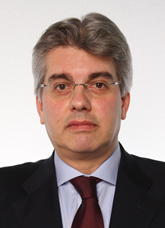
	Majority party	Minority party
Leader	Maria Rita Lorenzetti	Pietro Laffranco
Party	DS	Forza Italia
Alliance	The Union	House of Freedoms
Last election	20 seats, 56.4%	10 seats, 39.1%
Seats won	19	11
Seat change	▼1	▲1
Popular vote	316,776	169,176
Percentage	63.0%	33.7%
Swing	▲6.6%	▼5.4%
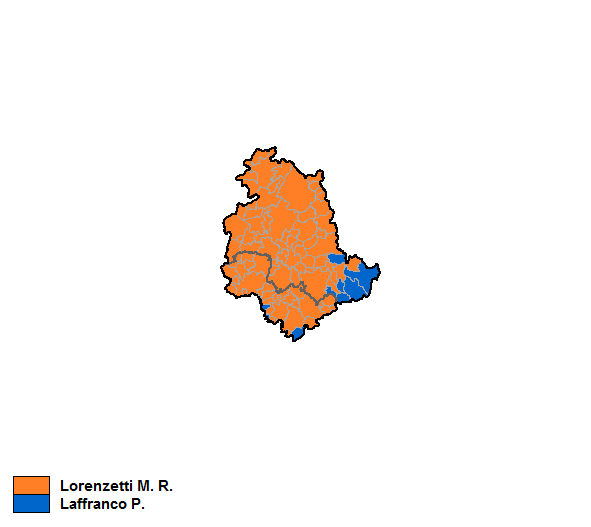
President before election
Maria Rita Lorenzetti
DS
Elected President
Maria Rita Lorenzetti
DS

The Umbrian regional election of 2005 took place on 3–4 April 2005.

Incumbent Maria Rita Lorenzetti (Democrats of the Left, then Democratic Party) defeated Pietro Laffranco (National Alliance) by a landslide to remain as President of Umbria.

== Results ==
Candidates & parties	votes	votes (%)	seats reg. list	seats prov. lists
Maria Rita Lorenzetti	316,770	63.00	3	16
The Olive Tree	207,417	45.19	→	12
Communist Refoundation Party	42,473	9.25	→	2
Party of Italian Communists	24,086	5.25	→	1
Federation of the Greens	10,664	2.32	→	1
UDEUR	5,592	1.22	→	0
Pietro Laffranco	169,176	33.65	1	10
Forza Italia	72,480	15.79	→	5
National Alliance	62,903	13.70	→	4
Union of Christian and Centre Democrats	22,645	4.93	→	1
Marcello Ramadori	9,530	1.90	-	-
Socialist Party – New PSI	6,735	1.47	→	0
Luca Romagnoli	7,348	1.46	-	-
Social Alternative	3,998	0.87	→	0
Total	502,824	100.00	4	26

Source: Ministry of the Interior
