= Catiuscia Marini =

Italian politician

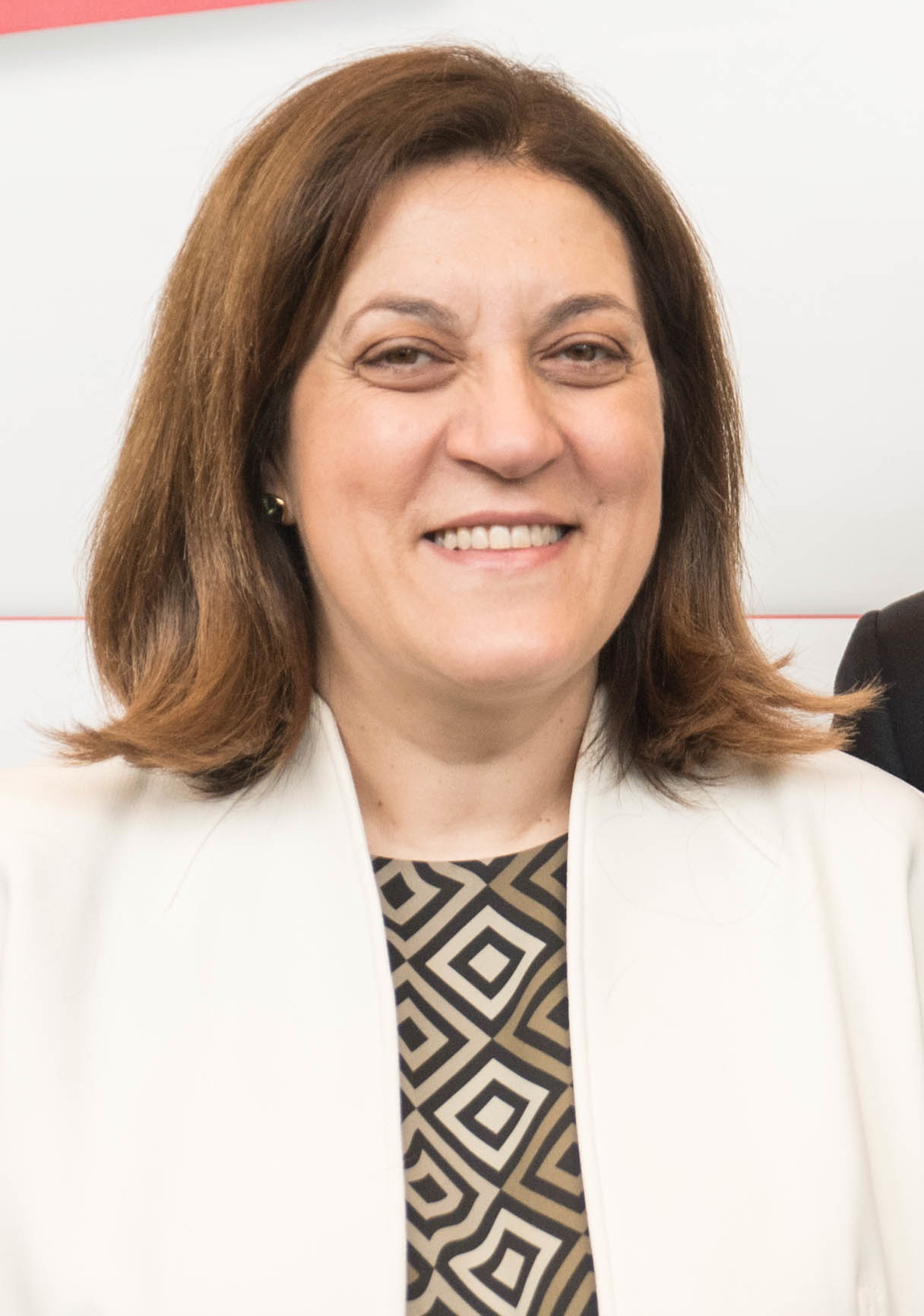

President of Umbria
- In office 16 April 2010 – 28 May 2019
- Preceded by: Maria Rita Lorenzetti
- Succeeded by: Donatella Tesei

Member of the European Parliament for Central Italy
- In office 16 May 2008 – 13 July 2009

Mayor of Todi
- In office 26 May 1998 – 28 May 2007
- Preceded by: Ottavio Nulli Pero
- Succeeded by: Antonino Ruggiano

Personal details
- Born: 25 September 1967 (age 59) Todi, Italy
- Party: DS (1998–2007); PD (since 2007)
- Education: University of Perugia

Catiuscia Marini (born 25 September 1967) is an Italian politician and manager. She was president of Umbria from 2010 to 2019. She has been a manager of Legacoop since 2007.

== Biography ==
Marini graduated in political science with an international political orientation at the University of Perugia.

After holding the posts of city councillor and deputy mayor of the same city, in 1998, Marini was elected mayor of Todi and held the office until 2007. In 2000, she was named by UNICEF as the ideal defender mayor of children for its activities in support of projects for the protection of children's rights.

Marini was MEP from 2008 to 2009; she was a member of the parliamentary group of the European Socialist Party, of the Internal Market and Consumer Protection Commission and of the delegation for the Maghreb countries. She ran again for the European Parliament in 2009, but was not elected.

She was elected president of the Umbria region in the regional election of 2010; was then reconfirmed also in the 2015 regional election.

On 16 April 2019, following an inquiry by the prosecutor's office of Perugia on alleged wrongdoings in the employment of the Umbrian health system (in which she was investigated for abuse of office, revelation of official and false secret), Marini announced her resignation as president of the region. On 7 May she justified in the Umbrian Legislative Assembly her resignation, that was rejected on the 18 May by the same Assembly; finally, she confirmed the resignation two days later.

== Electoral history ==
Election	House	Constituency	Party	Votes	Result
2004	European Parliament	Central Italy	Ulivo	57,771	Not elected
2009	European Parliament	Central Italy	PD	63,964	Not elected

== See also ==
- 2010 Umbrian regional election
- 2015 Umbrian regional election
