= Maria Rita Lorenzetti =

Italian politician (born 1953)

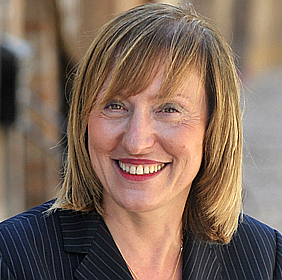

President of Umbria
- In office 17 April 2000 – 16 April 2010
- Preceded by: Bruno Bracalente
- Succeeded by: Catiuscia Marini

Member of the Chamber of Deputies
- In office 2 July 1987 – 15 May 2000
- Constituency: Umbria

Personal details
- Born: 16 March 1953 (age 73) Foligno, Umbria, Italy
- Party: PCI (until 1991); PDS (1991–1998); DS (1998–2007); PD (since 2007)
- Education: University of Perugia

Maria Rita Lorenzetti (born 16 March 1953 in Foligno) is an Italian politician and a former President of the Italian region of Umbria. In 2000 she was elected governor of Umbria becoming the first woman to serve as governor of Umbria, the fifth woman to serve as governor in Italy, and the first woman directly elected as governor of an Italian region.

From 2010 to 2013 he served as president of Italferr in Florence, a company of the Ferrovie dello Stato group.

== Biography ==
Graduated in philosophy in 1974, she began her political activity in 1975 as a municipal councilor of the PCI. He also held the positions of councilor and mayor of the municipality of Foligno. She served as MP from 1987 to 2000.

In 2000 she was elected President of the Umbria region and was re-confirmed in the 2005 regional election.

In 2000 she was appointed President of Italferr. During the period in which she was president of Italferr she was investigated, together with about thirty people, by the Florence Public Prosecutor with the charges of criminal association, abuse of office, corruption and illicit traffic of waste. For the alleged crimes, on 16 September 2013 Lorenzetti was placed under house arrest, that was revoked on 30 September after her resignation as President of Italferr. She was later acquitted of all charges in 2022.

On 18 November 2014 Lorenzetti was sentenced to eight months imprisonment (with suspended sentence because uncensored) by the Court of Perugia for the offense of ideological forgery regarding a March 2010 resolution, authorizing some local Umbrian health companies the recruitment of staff; at the same time she announced her intention to appeal the sentence. The provision is therefore confirmed first by the Court of Appeal of Perugia on 15 March 2016 and then by the Court of Cassation, which declared it definitive on 28 September 2017.

== Electoral history ==
Election	House	Constituency	Party	Votes	Result
1987	Chamber of Deputies	Perugia–Terni–Rieti	PCI	12,048	Elected
1992	Chamber of Deputies	Perugia–Terni–Rieti	PDS	12,826	Elected
1994	Chamber of Deputies	Foligno	PDS	38,556	Elected
1996	Chamber of Deputies	Foligno	PDS	48,706	Elected
