= 1980 Umbrian regional election =

The Umbrian regional election of 1980 took place on 8 June 1980.

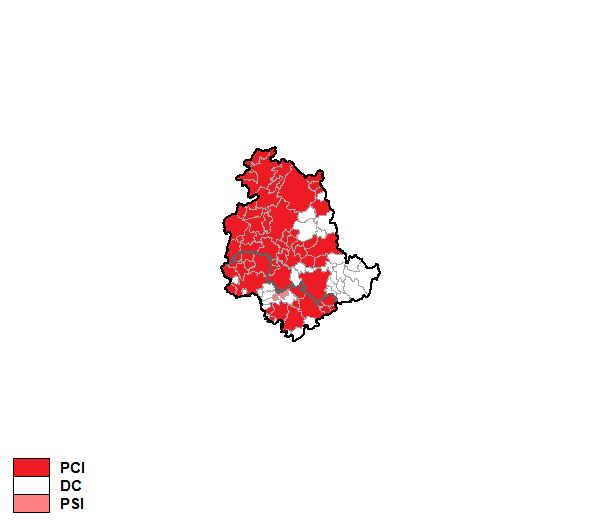
Largest party by municipality

== Events ==
The Italian Communist Party was by far the largest party, gaining almost twice the votes of Christian Democracy. After the election, Germano Marri, the incumbent Communist President, continued to govern the Region at the head of a left-wing coalition with the Italian Socialist Party (Popular Democratic Front).

== Results ==
Parties	votes	votes (%)	seats
Italian Communist Party	253,874	45.2	14
Christian Democracy	154,853	27.6	9
Italian Socialist Party	80,202	14.3	4
Italian Social Movement	30,589	5.4	1
Italian Republican Party	14,906	2.7	1
Italian Democratic Socialist Party	14,532	2.6	1
Proletarian Unity Party	7,250	1.3	-
Italian Liberal Party	5,838	1.0	-
Total	562,044	100.0	30

Source: Ministry of the Interior
