= 1985 Umbrian regional election =

The Umbrian regional election of 1985 took place on 12 May 1985.

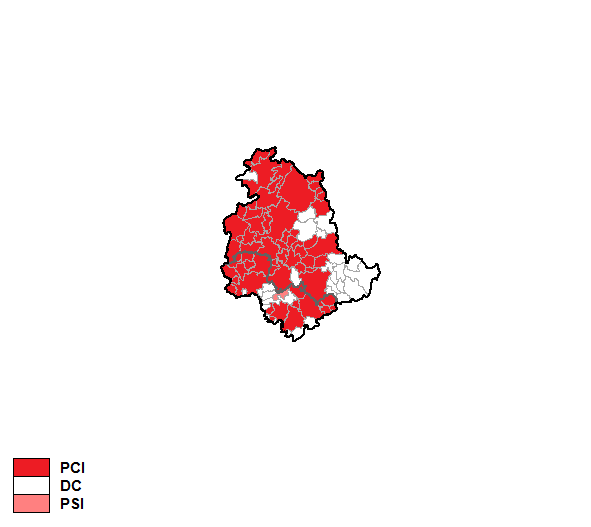
Largest party by municipality

== Events ==
The Italian Communist Party was by far the largest party. After the election, Germano Marri, the incumbent Communist President, continued to govern the Region at the head of a left-wing coalition with the Italian Socialist Party (Popular Democratic Front). In 1987 Marri was replaced by Francesco Mandarini, a Communist too.

== Results ==
Parties	votes	votes (%)	seats
Italian Communist Party	258,806	44.4	14
Christian Democracy	160,388	27.5	9
Italian Socialist Party	84,587	14.5	4
Italian Social Movement	36,960	6.3	2
Italian Republican Party	14,996	2.6	1
Italian Democratic Socialist Party	9,840	1.7	-
Proletarian Democracy	7,188	1.2	-
Italian Liberal Party	5,197	0.9	-
Valdostan Union – Democratic Party – others	2,326	0.4	-
Pensioners Italian Alliance – Venetian League	2,103	0.4	-
Pensioners' National Party	1,183	0.2	-
Total	583,574	100.0	30

Source: Ministry of the Interior
