= Bruno Bracalente =

Italian politician

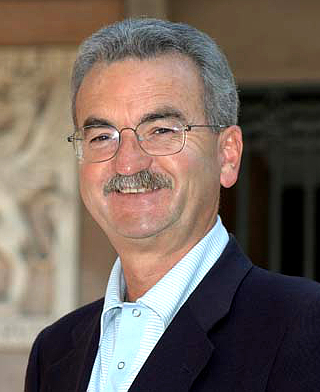
Bruno Bracalente

Bruno Bracalente is an Italian politician and professor who served as President of Umbria and university professor and Director of the Department of Statistical Sciences at University of Perugia. In the 1995 Italian regional elections, he got 331,349 or 59.94% votes.
