= 2015 Umbrian regional election =

- May 31, 2015

All 21 seats to the Regional Council of Umbria
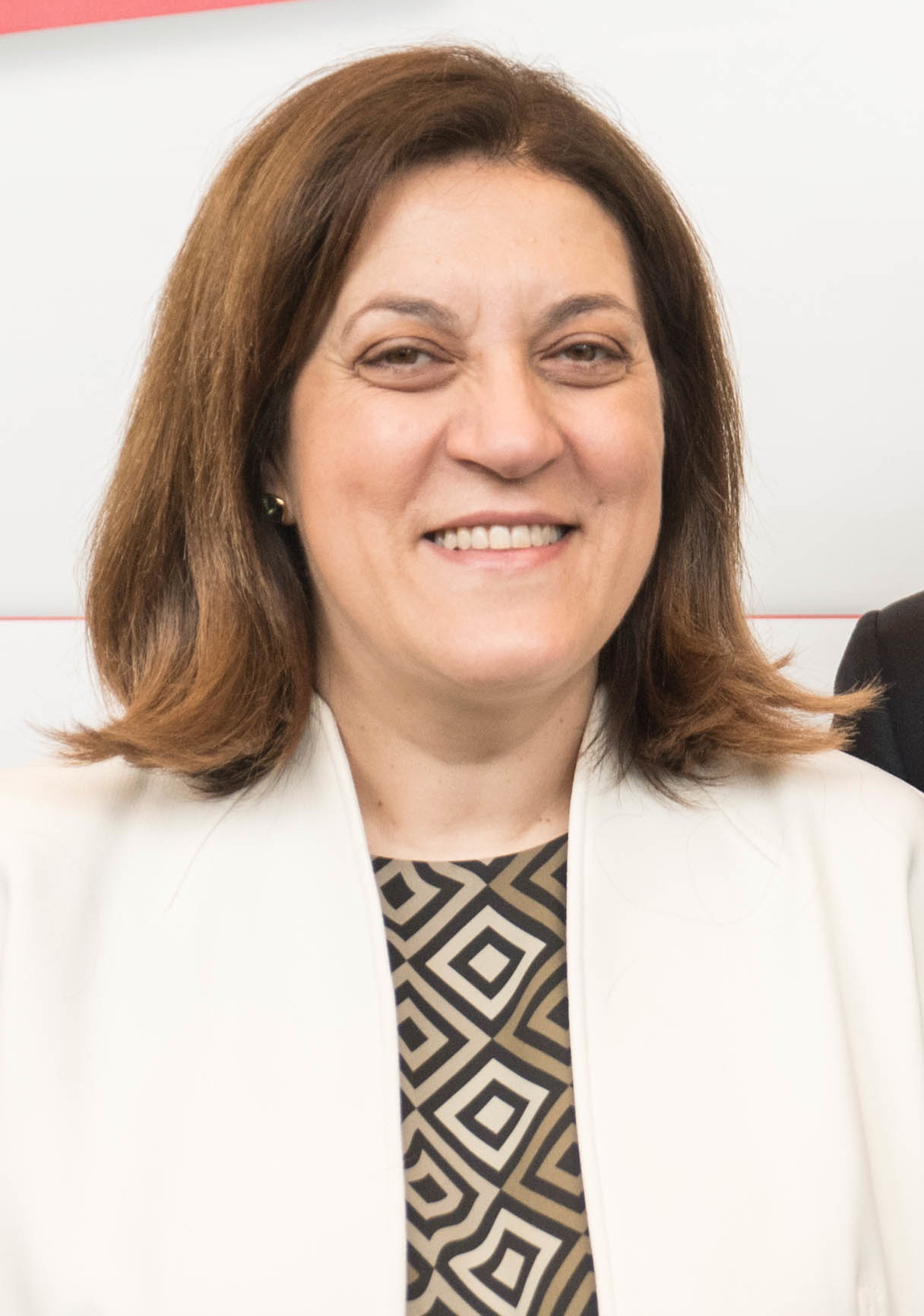

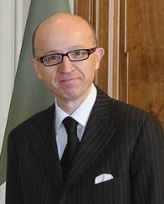

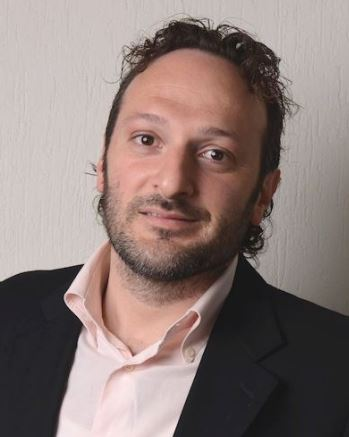
| | Majority party | Minority party | Third party |
|---|---|---|---|
| Leader | Catiuscia Marini | Claudio Ricci | Andrea Liberati |
| Party | Democratic Party | Independent | Five Star Movement |
| Alliance | Centre-left | Centre-right |
| Last election | 19 seats, 57.2% | 10 seats, 37.7% | new party |
| Seats won | 13 | 6 | 2 |
| Seat change | ▼6 | ▼4 | new |
| Popular vote | 159,869 | 146,752 | 53,458 |
| Percentage | 42.8% | 39.3% | 14.3% |
| Swing | ▼14.4% | ▲1.6% | new |
President before election
Catiuscia Marini
Democratic Party
Elected President
Catiuscia Marini
Democratic Party

The Umbrian regional election of 2015 took place on 31 May 2015.

Catiuscia Marini of the Democratic Party (PD) was narrowly re-elected President over the joint-centre-right candidate, Claudio Ricci. The PD was by far the largest party, while the Five Star Movement and the Northern League Umbria had a breakthrough.

== Results ==
31 May 2015 Umbrian regional election results
| Candidates | Votes | % | Seats | Parties | Votes | % | Seats |
|---|---|---|---|---|---|---|---|
| Catiuscia Marini | 159,869 | 42.78 | 1 | Democratic Party | 125.777 | 35.76 | 11 |
| Catiuscia Marini | 159,869 | 42.78 | 1 | Reformist Socialists | 12.200 | 3.47 | 1 |
| Catiuscia Marini | 159,869 | 42.78 | 1 | Left Ecology Freedom | 9.010 | 2.56 | – |
| Catiuscia Marini | 159,869 | 42.78 | 1 | Civic and Popular | 5,172 | 1.47 | – |
| Catiuscia Marini | 159,869 | 42.78 | 1 | Total | 152,159 | 43.26 | 12 |
| Claudio Ricci | 146,752 | 39.27 | 1 | Northern League Umbria | 49,203 | 13.99 | 2 |
| Claudio Ricci | 146,752 | 39.27 | 1 | Forza Italia | 30,017 | 8.53 | 1 |
| Claudio Ricci | 146,752 | 39.27 | 1 | Brothers of Italy | 21,931 | 6.24 | 1 |
| Claudio Ricci | 146,752 | 39.27 | 1 | Ricci for President | 15,784 | 4.49 | 1 |
| Claudio Ricci | 146,752 | 39.27 | 1 | Change in Umbria (incl. SC) | 9,374 | 2.67 | – |
| Claudio Ricci | 146,752 | 39.27 | 1 | For Popular Umbria (incl. NCD, UdC) | 9,285 | 2.64 | – |
| Claudio Ricci | 146,752 | 39.27 | 1 | Total | 135.594 | 38.55 | 5 |
| Andrea Liberati | 53,458 | 14.31 | 1 | Five Star Movement | 51,203 | 14.56 | 1 |
| Michele Vecchietti | 5,858 | 1.57 | – | Umbria for Another Europe (incl. PRC) | 5,561 | 1.58 | – |
| Simone Di Stefano | 2,457 | 0.66 | – | Sovereignty | 2,343 | 0.67 | – |
| Amato John De Paulis | 2,155 | 0.58 | – | Reformist Alternative | 1,919 | 0.55 | – |
| Aurelio Fabiani | 1,820 | 0.49 | – | Red House | 1,662 | 0.47 | – |
| Fulvio Carlo Maiorca | 1,304 | 0.35 | – | New Force | 1,255 | 0.36 | – |
| Blank and invalid votes | 17,537 | 4.48 | – | | | | |
| Total candidates | 373,673 | 100.00 | 3 | Total parties | 351,696 | 100.00 | 18 |
| Registered voters/turnout | 705.819 | 55.43 | – | | | | |
Source: Ministry of the Interior – Results

== See also ==
- 2015 Italian regional elections
