= Stefania Proietti =

Italian politician (born 1975)

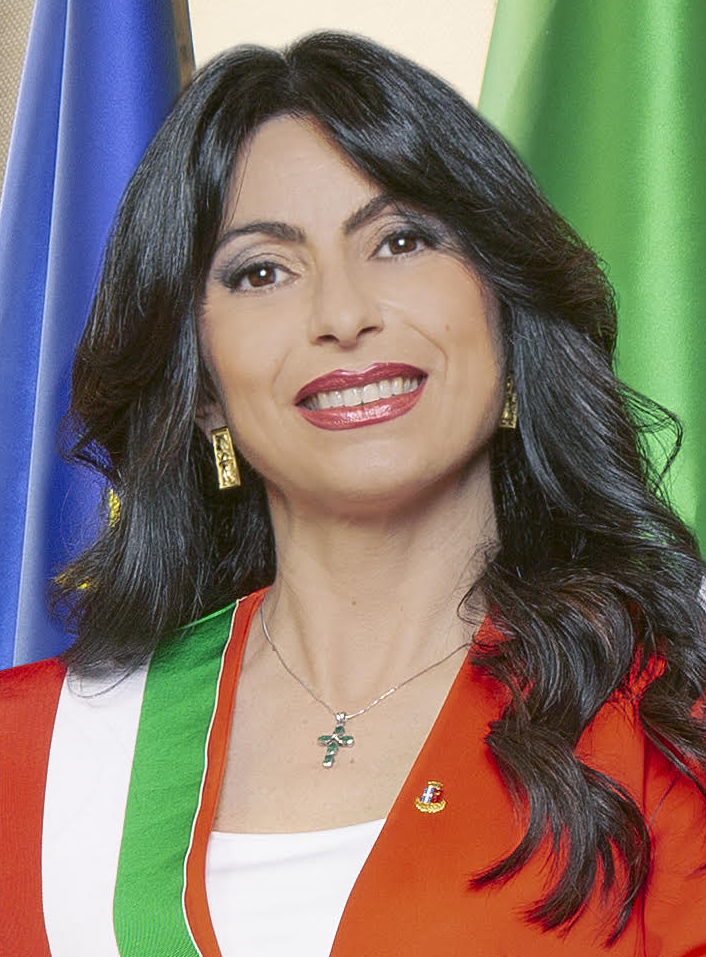
- Official portrait, 2022

President of Umbria
- Incumbent
- Assumed office 2 December 2024
- Preceded by: Donatella Tesei

President of the Province of Perugia
- In office 20 December 2021 – 23 December 2024
- Preceded by: Luciano Bacchetta
- Succeeded by: Massimiliano Presciutti

Mayor of Assisi
- In office 21 June 2016 – 30 December 2024
- Preceded by: Claudio Ricci
- Succeeded by: Valter Stoppini

Personal details
- Born: 5 January 1975 (age 51) Assisi, Italy
- Party: independent
- Other political affiliations: Centre-left coalition
- Education: University of Perugia
- Profession: University professor, engineer

Stefania Proietti (born 5 January 1975) is an Italian academic, engineer, and politician. She is the President of Umbria having won the 2024 regional election as a centre-left candidate.

She has served as president of the province of Perugia since 2021, and as mayor of Assisi since 2016. She works as an associate professor of fluid dynamics at Guglielmo Marconi University. In the 2019 Democratic Party leadership election, she endorsed Marco Minniti.

Political offices
Preceded by Donatella Tesei	President of Umbria since 2024	Incumbent
Preceded by Claudio Ricci	Mayor of Assisi; 2016-2024	Succeeded by TBE
Preceded by Luciano Bacchetta	President of the Province of Perugia; 2021-2024	Succeeded by Massimiliano Presciutti
