= 1990 Umbrian regional election =

The Umbrian regional election of 1990 took place on 6 and 7 May 1990.

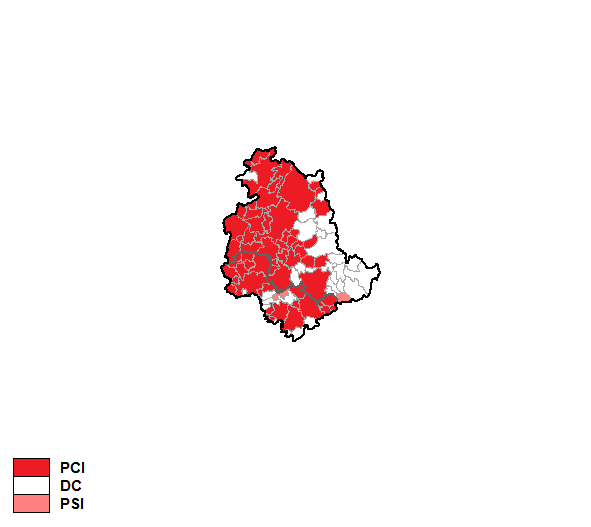
Largest party by municipality

== Events ==
The Italian Communist Party was by far the largest party, even if it lost several votes from the previous election in 1985. After the election, Francesco Mandarini, the incumbent Communist President, continued to govern the Region at the head of a left-wing coalition with the Italian Socialist Party (Popular Democratic Front).

In 1992 Mandarini was replaced by Francesco Ghirelli, to whom Claudio Carnieri succeeded in 1993. Both Ghirelli and Carnieri were members of the Democratic Party of the Left, the successor party of the Communist Party since 1991.

== Results ==
Parties	votes	votes (%)	seats
Italian Communist Party	221,330	38.4	12
Christian Democracy	158,727	27.5	9
Italian Socialist Party	92,792	16.1	5
Italian Social Movement	25,664	4.5	1
Hunting Fishing Environment	19,078	3.3	1
Italian Republican Party	15,828	2.7	1
Green List	12,467	2.2	1
Rainbow Greens	8,001	1.4	-
Proletarian Democracy	8,081	1.2	-
Italian Democratic Socialist Party	6,843	1.2	-
Italian Liberal Party	4,358	0.8	-
Pensioners' List	3,434	0.6	-
Centre League Umbria	1,370	0.2	-
Total	576,973	100.0	30

Source: Ministry of the Interior
