= Donatella Tesei =

Italian politician and lawyer

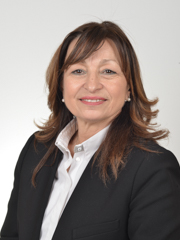

President of Umbria
- In office 11 November 2019 – 2 December 2024
- Preceded by: Catiuscia Marini
- Succeeded by: Stefania Proietti

Member of the Senate of the Republic
- In office 23 March 2018 – 21 December 2019
- Constituency: Terni

Mayor of Montefalco
- In office 8 June 2009 – 26 May 2019
- Preceded by: Valentino Valentini
- Succeeded by: Luigi Titta

Personal details
- Born: 17 June 1958 (age 68) Foligno, Italy
- Party: Lega
- Education: University of Perugia
- Profession: lawyer

Donatella Tesei (born 17 June 1958) is an Italian politician and lawyer, former President of the Umbria region.

== Biography ==
Tesei is a civil and administrative lawyer. She served as mayor of Montefalco from 2009 to 2019.

She joined the right-wing populist League party and served as the member of the Italian Senate for Terni from 23 March 2018 to December 2019.

Tesei was elected President of Umbria at the 2019 regional election and took office on 11 November 2019.

== Electoral history ==
Election	House	Constituency	Party	Votes	Result
2018	Senate of the Republic	Terni	Lega	85,065	Elected
