= Constitution, Environment, Labour =

Constitution, Environment, Labour Costituzione, Ambiente, Lavoro
- Chamber: Senate
- Foundation: 27 April 2022
- Leader: Mattia Crucioli (Note: Group leader in the Senate)
- Ideology: Populism; Euroscepticism; Communism (minority)
- Political position: Left-wing (majority)

Constitution, Environment, Labour (Italian: Costituzione, Ambiente, Lavoro, CAL), whose full name was United for the Constitution – C.A.L. (Constitution, Environment, Labour) – Alternative – PC – Italy Again – Project SMART – IdV (Italian: Uniti per la Costituzione – C.A.L. (Costituzione, Ambiente, Lavoro) – Alternativa – PC – Ancora Italia – Progetto SMART – IdV), was a heterogeneous populist, Eurosceptic, and mainly left-wing parliamentary group active in the Senate of the Republic.

All of its members were elected for the Five Star Movement (M5S) in the 2018 Italian general election.

== History ==
The groups's forebear was C.A.L. (Constitution, Environment, Labour)–IdV, which was briefly active in January 2022.

In April 2022, the group was eventually relaunched with the participation of senators from Alternative, the Communist Party, and Italy of Values, plus some non-party independents. Mattia Crucioli was elected as the group's president. Since its establishment, CAL opposed Mario Draghi's government and any intervention in the Russo-Ukrainian War.

In the 2022 local elections, Crucioli ran for mayor in Genoa, where he was supported by other parties composing CAL, as well as other populist and Eurosceptic parties including Gianluigi Paragone's Italexit, and obtained 3.7% of the vote. The alliance was named United for the Constitution, which was later incorporated in the group's official name. In June 2022, group member Bianca Laura Granato joined Italy Again, a populist and Eurosceptic party founded by Diego Fusaro.

In the run-up of the 2022 general election, Alternative briefly joined forces with Italexit (the alliance was dissolved by Alternative due to allegations about the presence of neofascist candidates within Italexit's lists), while the Communist Party and Italy Again launched Sovereign and Popular Italy.

== Composition ==
Party	Main ideology	Senators
Alternative (Note: Senators Rosa Silvana Abate, Luisa Angrisani and Mattia Crucioli.)	Euroscepticism	3
Communist Party (Note: Senator Emanuele Dessì.)	Communism	1
Italy of Values (Note: Senator Elio Lannutti.)	Populism	1
Italy Again (Note: Senator Bianca Laura Granato.)	Populism	1
Non-party independents (Note: Senators Margherita Corrado, Silvana Giannuzzi, Virginia La Mura, Barbara Lezzi, Cataldo Mininno, Vito Rosario Petrocelli, Rosellina Sbrana.)		7
Total		13

Source: Senate of the Republic

== Leadership ==
- President: Mattia Crucioli (2022–present)
- Vice President: Bianca Laura Granato (2022–present)
