= Rosa Silvana Abate =

Italian politician

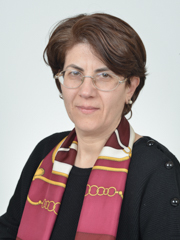

Member of the Senate of the Republic
- In office 23 March 2018 – 12 October 2022

Personal details
- Born: 11 December 1963 (age 62) Corigliano Calabro, Italy
- Party: Five Star Movement (until 2021); Alternativa (since 2021)

Rosa Silvana Abate (born 11 December 1963) is an Italian politician who served as a Senator for the Five Star Movement. She was expelled from M5S on 17 February 2021, along with the 14 other senators who voted against the Draghi government on a motion of no confidence. That same year, she joined the political party Alternativa, a political party established by the expelled deputies.

== Life and career ==
Abate has a law degree and works as a lawyer. In the 2018 Italian general election, she was elected senator for the Five Star Movement.

On 17 February 2021, she was among the 15 senators who did not vote in favour of the Draghi government. The following day, the political leader of the movement, Vito Crimi, announced the expulsion of all 15 senators who did not vote in favour of the government.

On 26 April 2022, Abate joined Pino Cabras. The following day, together with some former members of the Five Star Movement and senators from the Communist Party (Italy) and Italy of Values, he founded the C.A.L. (Constitution, Environment, Labour) - PC - IdV political group. She ended her parliamentary term in October 2022.

== See also ==
- List of current Italian senators
