= Sardinia (Chamber of Deputies constituency) =

- Chamber of Deputies; Electoral constituency
- Region: Sardinia
- Electorate: 1,368,471 (2018)
- Major settlements: Cagliari, Nuoro, Oristano, Sassari

Current constituency
- Created: 1993
- Seats: 17
- Members: M5S (11); PD (3); FI (2); Lega (1); FdI (1)

Sardinia is one of the 29 constituencies (Italian: circoscrizioni) represented in the Chamber of Deputies, the lower house of the Italian parliament. The constituency currently elects 17 deputies. Its boundaries correspond to those of the Italian region of Sardinia. The electoral system uses a parallel voting system, which act as a mixed system, with 37% of seats allocated using a first-past-the-post electoral system and 61% using a proportional method, with one round of voting.

The constituency was first established by the Mattarella law on 4 August 1993 and later confirmed by the Calderoli law on 21 December 2005 and by the Rosato law on 3 November 2017.

== Members of the Parliament ==
=== 2018–present ===
Single-member districts
District			Deputy	Party
N.	Name	Map	Deputy	Party
01	Cagliari		Andrea Mura then Andrea Frailis	Five Star Movement (Mura); Democratic Party (Frailis)
02	Nuoro		Mara Lapia	Five Star Movement then Democratic Centre
03	Carbonia		Pino Cabras	Five Star Movement then Alternativa
04	Sassari		Mario Perantoni	Five Star Movement
05	Olbia		Nardo Marino	Five Star Movement then Italia Viva
06	Oristano		Luciano Cadeddu	Five Star Movement

Multi-member districts
District			Party	Deputy
N.	Name	Map	Party	Deputy
01	Sardinia 01		M5S	Emanuela Corda
01	Sardinia 01		M5S	Andrea Vallascas
01	Sardinia 01		M5S	Lucia Scanu
01	Sardinia 01		PD	Romina Mura
01	Sardinia 01		FI	Ugo Cappellacci
01	Sardinia 01		Lega	Guido De Martini
01	Sardinia 01		FdI	Salvatore Deidda
02	Sardinia 02		M5S	Alberto Manca
02	Sardinia 02		M5S	Paola Deiana
02	Sardinia 02		PD	Gavino Manca
02	Sardinia 02		FI	Pietro Pittalis
