= Emanuela Corda =

Italian politician (born 1974)

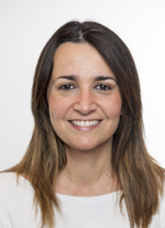
- Corda in 2018

Member of the Chamber of Deputies
- In office 15 March 2013 – 12 October 2022
- Constituency: Sardinia (2013–2018); Sardinia – P01 (2018–2022)

Personal details
- Born: 23 November 1974 (age 51)
- Party: Five Star Movement (2013–2021); Alternativa (2021–2025)

Emanuela Corda (born 23 November 1974) is an Italian politician. From 2013 to 2022, she was a member of the Chamber of Deputies. From 2019 to 2022, she served as chairwoman of the regional affairs committee.

== Biography ==
In the 2013 general election, she ran for the Chamber of Deputies (Italy) as the lead candidate on the Five Star Movement (M5S) list in the Sardinia constituency and was elected as a deputy. During the 17th Legislature, she served as a member and group leader for the M5S on the 4th Defense Committee.

In the 2018 general election, she ran again for the Chamber of Deputies on the Five Star Movement’s lists in the Sardinia - 01 multi-member district and was re-elected to Palazzo Montecitorio. During the 18th Legislature of the Republic, she served as chair of the Parliamentary Commission on Regional Affairs and as a member and M5S group leader on the 4th Defense Commission.

On February 18, 2021, she did not vote in favor of the motion of confidence in the Draghi government and was therefore expelled from the Five Star Movement. On February 23, she joined the Pino Cabras faction of the mixed group in the Chamber of Deputies.

On October 16, 2022, she was elected vice president of Alternativa by the movement’s National Assembly, and on February 19, 2023, following Mattia Crucioli resignation, she was elected party president.

In the 2024 local elections, she ran for mayor of Cagliari, on the Alternativa ticket (the only list supporting her), receiving 0.89% of the vote and failing to win a seat, finishing last out of five candidates.

On July 31, 2025, Alternativa voted to dissolve itself.
