= List of presidents of the Province of Genoa =

President of the Province of Genoa
- Presidente della Provincia di Genova
- Inaugural holder: Ambrogio Doria
- Formation: 1889
- Final holder: Alessandro Repetto
- Abolished: 2014
- Superseded by: Metropolitan mayor of Genoa

The president of the Province of Genoa was the head of the provincial administration of Genoa, a local government authority in Liguria, Italy.

== History ==
The office of president of the Province of Genoa was established in 1889, initially within the Provincial Deputation. Before that date, the Deputation was headed by the prefect. During the Fascist period (1926–1945), the province was governed by appointed officials, including Royal Commissioners and presidents of reorganised provincial structures under central control.

After World War II, the office was restored and gradually redefined within the Italian Republic, first with indirect election by the Provincial Council and, from 1993, with direct popular election.

The province was eventually replaced in 2015 by the Metropolitan City of Genoa.

== List ==
=== Presidents of the Provincial Deputation (1889–1926) ===
| No. | Portrait | Name | Term of office | | Party |
| No. | Portrait | Name | Start | End | Party |
|---|---|---|---|---|---|
| 1 | | Ambrogio Doria | 1889 | 1892 | |
| 2 | | Vittorio Del Carretto di Balestrino | 1892 | 1894 | |
| 3 | | Giuseppe Elia | 1895 | 1903 | |
| 4 | | Paolo Zunino | 1903 | 1918 | |
| 5 | | Giannetto Palmieri | 1918 | 1926 | |

=== Presidents of the Royal Commission (1926–1929) ===
| No. | Portrait | Name | Term of office | | Party |
| No. | Portrait | Name | Start | End | Party |
|---|---|---|---|---|---|
| 1 | | Francesco Montuori | 1926 | 1927 | National Fascist Party |
| 2 | | Giuseppe Caratti | 1927 | 1929 | National Fascist Party |

=== Presidents of the Provincial Rectorate (1929–1945) ===
| No. | Portrait | Name | Term of office | | Party |
| No. | Portrait | Name | Start | End | Party |
|---|---|---|---|---|---|
| 1 | | Aldo Gardini | 1929 | 1933 | National Fascist Party |
| 1 | | Aldo Gardini | 1933 | 1937 | National Fascist Party |
| 1 | | Aldo Gardini | 1937 | 1940 | National Fascist Party |
| 2 | | Vittorio Doria Lamba | 1940 | 1942 | National Fascist Party |
| 3 | | Edoardo Sciaccaluga | 29 December 1942 | 10 March 1944 | National Fascist Party |
| – | | Virgilio Balli (Prefectural commissioner) | 10 March 1944 | 1945 | — |

=== Presidents of the Provincial Deputation (1945–1951) ===
| No. | Portrait | Name | Term of office | | Party |
| No. | Portrait | Name | Start | End | Party |
|---|---|---|---|---|---|
| 1 | | Raimondo Enrico | 2 July 1945 | 23 August 1950 | Christian Democracy |
| 2 | | Giovanni Maggio | 1 September 1950 | 1951 | Christian Democracy |

=== Presidents of the Province (1951–2014) ===
| No. | Portrait | Name | Term of office | | Party |
| No. | Portrait | Name | Start | End | Party |
|---|---|---|---|---|---|
| 1 | | Giovanni Maggio | 1951 | 1962 | Christian Democracy |
| 2 | | Francesco Cattanei | 1962 | 1967 | Christian Democracy |
| 3 | | Carlo Pastorino | 1967 | 1970 | Christian Democracy |
| 4 | | Gabriele Di Pasqua | 1970 | 1971 | Christian Democracy |
| 5 | | Delio Meoli | 1971 | 1972 | Italian Socialist Party |
| – | | Fausto Cuocolo (Acting president) | 12 May 1972 | 11 August 1972 | Christian Democracy |
| 6 | | Rinaldo Magnani | 1972 | 1980 | Italian Socialist Party |
| 7 | | Elio Carocci | 1980 | 1985 | Italian Communist Party |
| 8 | | Giancarlo Mori | 11 June 1985 | 13 April 1990 | Christian Democracy |
| 9 | | Franco Rolandi | 13 April 1990 | 9 August 1993 | Italian Socialist Party |
| – | | Giuseppe Piccolo (Prefectural commissioner) | 9 August 1993 | 13 December 1993 | |
| 10 | | Marta Vincenzi | 13 December 1993 | 1 December 1997 | Democratic Party of the Left; Democrats of the Left |
| 10 | | Marta Vincenzi | 1 December 1997 | 28 May 2002 | Democratic Party of the Left; Democrats of the Left |
| 11 | | Alessandro Repetto | 28 May 2002 | 12 June 2007 | The Daisy; Democratic Party |
| 11 | | Alessandro Repetto | 12 June 2007 | 10 May 2012 | The Daisy; Democratic Party |
| – | | Piero Fossati (Extraordinary commissioner) | 10 May 2012 | 31 December 2014 | |

== See also ==
- List of mayors of Genoa
- Metropolitan City of Genoa

== Sources ==
- "Storia amministrativa dell'ente". Ministero dell'Interno.
- "Gli Organi di Governo della Provincia di Genova (1860-1997)". Provincia di Genova.
- Menichini, Piera (2005). "I presidenti delle Province dall'Unità alla Grande guerra: repertorio analitico". Storia Amministrazione Costituzione (13): 252–253.
