= Alternativa (Italian political party) =

Political party in Italy

- Leader: Pino Cabras (2021-2022); Mattia Crucioli (2022-2023); Emanuela Corda (2023-2025)
- Founded: 23 February 2021
- Dissolved: 31 July 2025
- Split from: Five Star Movement
- Ideology: Populism; Euroscepticism
- Political position: Left-wing
- Colors: Orange

Website
- alternativa.it

Alternativa (English: Alternative, abbr. A or Alt) was a populist and Eurosceptic political party in Italy. It was established in February 2021 as a parliamentary sub-group of the Mixed Group named L'Alternativa c'è (English: There is an Alternative). Its members are former deputies of the Five Star Movement who were expelled from the party for having voted against Mario Draghi's government.

On 15 November 2021, Alternative became a full-fledged party and adopted its current name. The party's three senators sat in the Constitution, Environment, Labour group.

== History ==
Following the resignation of Prime Minister Giuseppe Conte, the Five Star Movement (M5S) asked its members to vote on the party's support to Mario Draghi's government. The party's members approved the online referendum with 59.3% of votes. During the investiture votes in the Parliament on 17–18 February 2021 for the Draghi government, 15 senators and 16 deputies voted against the new cabinet, being immediately expelled by the M5S party's acting leader Vito Crimi. On 23 February, 12 former deputies of the M5S re-organised themselves in a new sub-group within the Mixed Group, calling it L'Alternativa c'è.

As for the Senate, it is required by the rules of the Senate that a new group must be associated with one party that elected at least one senator, even in a joint list. Ignazio Messina, the secretary of Italy of Values (IdV) who ran in the Popular Civic List back in 2018 general election, agreed to put its party symbol at the disposal of the new group. The agreements failed after the legal attorney of IdV stated that there were no longer any political conditions for the disposal of the symbol at the Senate, meaning that they could instead be able to form a sub-group only within the Mixed Group. In April 2022, a group named Constitution, Environment, Labour was eventually launched with the participation of senators from Alternative, IdV and the Communist Party, plus some non-party independents.

In the 2022 local elections, Alternative's Mattia Crucioli ran for mayor in Genoa, where he was supported by other parties composing CAL, as well as other populist and Eurosceptic parties including Gianluigi Paragone's Italexit, and obtained 3.7% of the vote.

In the run-up of the 2022 general election, Alternative briefly joined forces with Italexit, while the Communist Party and Italy Again launched Sovereign and Popular Italy. Alternative dissolved the alliance due to allegations about the presence of neo-fascist candidates within Italexit's lists.

On 16 October 2022, the National Assembly of Alternativa elected Mattia Crucioli as president and Emanuela Corda as his deputy; Cabras thus ended his term of office, whilst remaining on the movement’s National Executive Committee. On 19 February 2023, Emanuela Corda became party leader following Crucioli’s resignation.

In the 2024 local elections, Alternative's Emanuela Corda ran for mayor in Cagliari and obtained 0.89% of the vote.

On 31 July 2025, Alternativa voted in favour of dissolving the political party.

== Ideology ==
According to their manifesto, the party is against public shares offering and privatizations, as they adhere to a doctrine of dirigisme and economic interventionism, supporting abolition or redrafting of the Maastricht criteria, the Stability and Growth Pact, and the European Fiscal Compact, rejecting the European Stability Mechanism, and opposing taking the loan part of the Next Generation EU quota. As for environmentalism, they claim to be the one closer to the original M5S manifesto and are in favour of green politics.

== Symbols ==
Old logo

New logo
