= Sant'Andrea di Morego, Genoa =

Church building in Genoa, Italy

Church of Saint Andrew of Morego (Chiesa di Sant'Andrea di Morego)
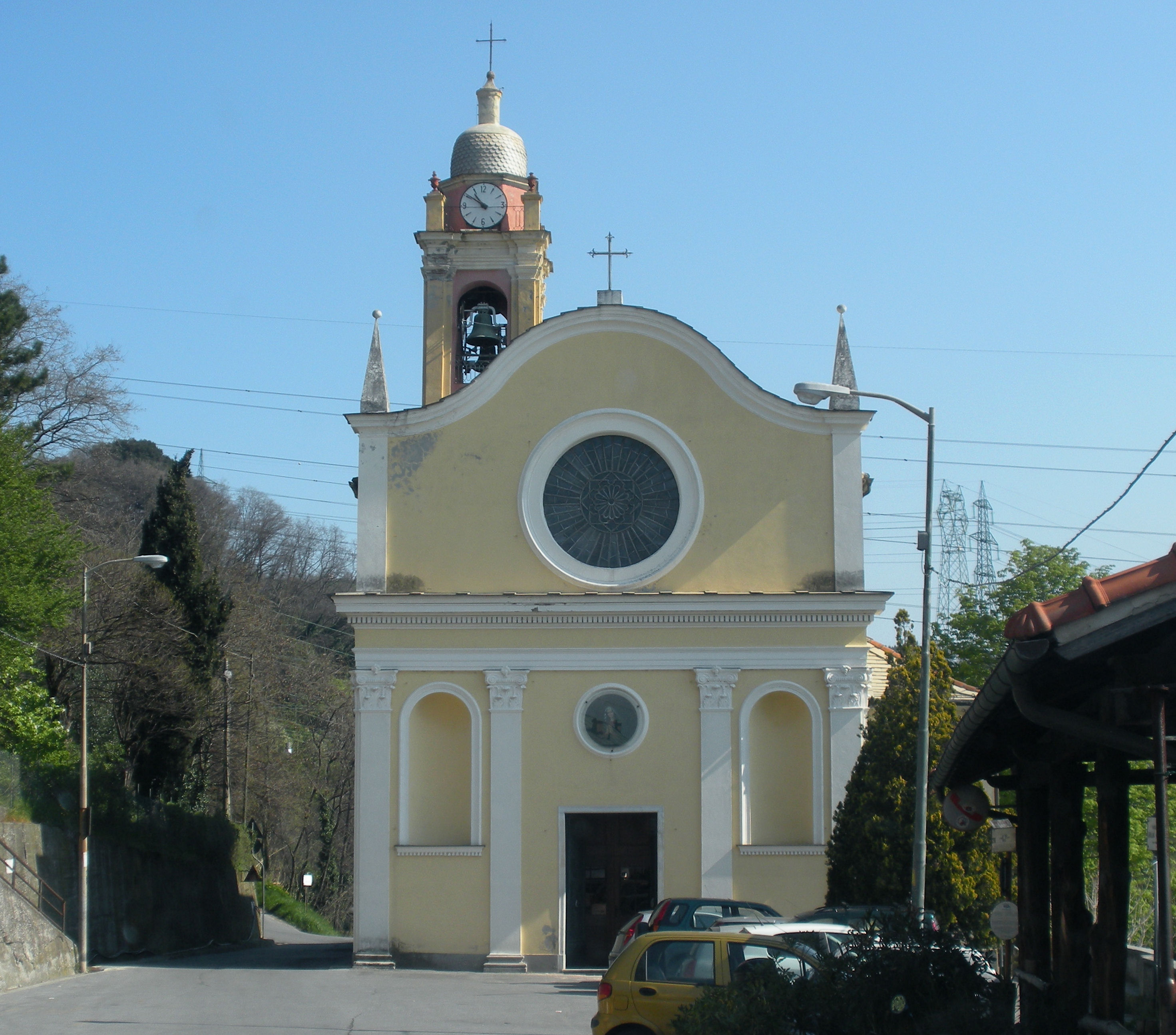
- The façade of the church.

Religion
- Affiliation: Roman Catholic
- Province: Genoa

Location
- Location: Genoa, Italy
- Interactive map of Church of Saint Andrew of Morego (Chiesa di Sant'Andrea di Morego)
- Coordinates: 44.477311°N 8.909444°E

Architecture
- Type: Church
- Groundbreaking: 12c
- Completed: 17c

Church of Saint Andrew of Morego (Italian: Chiesa di Sant'Andrea di Morego) is a Roman Catholic church in the city of Genoa, in the Province of Genoa and the region of Liguria, Italy.
