= Marta Vincenzi =

Italian politician and former Mayor of Genoa

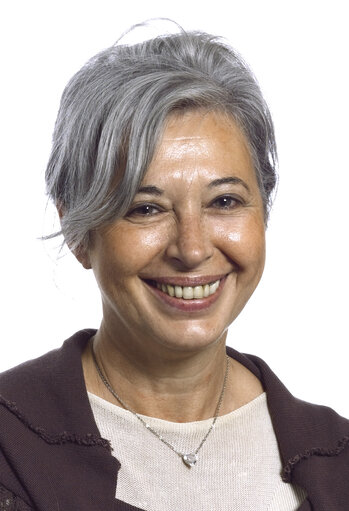

Mayor of Genoa
- In office 30 May 2007 – 21 May 2012
- Preceded by: Giuseppe Pericu
- Succeeded by: Marco Doria

Member of the European Parliament
- In office 20 July 2004 – 29 June 2007

President of the Province of Genoa
- In office 7 December 1993 – 29 May 2002
- Preceded by: Franco Rolandi
- Succeeded by: Alessandro Repetto

Personal details
- Born: 27 May 1947 (age 79) Genoa, Italy
- Party: Democratic Party
- Other political affiliations: Democrats of the Left Democratic Party of the Left Italian Communist Party

Marta Vincenzi (born 27 May 1947) is an Italian politician and former Mayor of Genoa. She was previously a Member of the European Parliament for the North-West of Italy with the Democrats of the Left (DS), part of the Socialist Group from 2004 until she resigned on 29 June 2007.

Vincenzi was born in Genoa. She sat on the European Parliament's Committee on Transport and Tourism, and was a substitute for the Committee on Regional Development and the Committee on Women's Rights and Gender Equality. She was also a member of the Delegation for relations with the Mashreq countries. She served as President of the Province of Genoa from 1993 to 2002. In May 2007 Marta Vincenzi became mayor of Genoa with the Democratic Party. In February 2012 she ran in a primary election to seek a second term as mayor, but lost to independent candidate Marco Doria.

== Career ==
- Graduate in philosophy
- Director of studies at an institute of higher education
- Member of the provincial and regional executives of the Italian Communist Party, the Democratic Party of the Left, and the DS
- Member of the DS national executive
- 1990: Member of the Municipal Council of Genoa with responsibility for educational institutions, IT, decentralisation and personnel
- 1993–2002: President of the Province of Genoa
- since 2002: Municipal councillor and training adviser delegated by the Provincial Council for the metropolitan area
- 2003: Vice-chairman of the company Sistema logistico dell'Arco ligure alessandrino s.r.l.
- 2004: Member of the board of directors of the International Institute of Communications of Genoa

== See also ==
- 2004 European Parliament election in Italy

European Parliament
Preceded by	Member of the European Parliament; 2004–2007	Succeeded by
Political offices
Preceded by Giuseppe Pericu	Mayor of Genoa; 2007–2012	Succeeded by Marco Doria
Preceded by Franco Rolandi	President of the Province of Genoa; 1993–2002	Succeeded by Alessandro Repetto
