= Monte Groppo Rosso =

Mountain in Italy

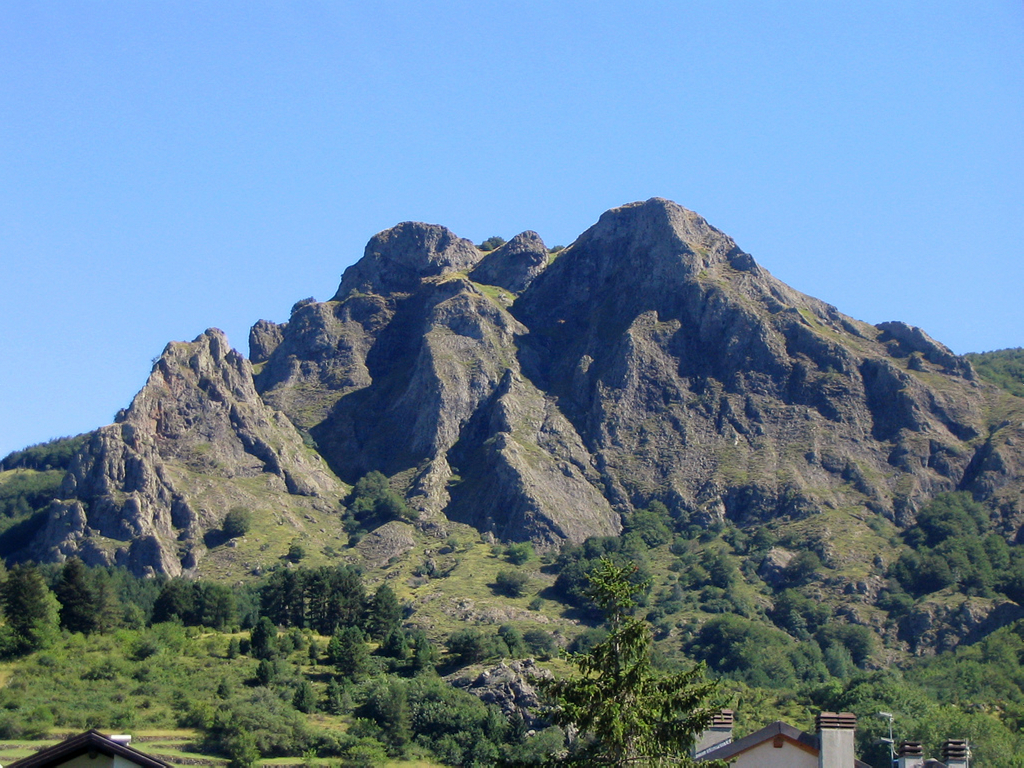

Highest point
- Elevation: 1,597 m (5,240 ft)
- Coordinates: 44.5611°N 9.46694°E

Geography
- Location within Italy
- Location: Liguria and Emilia-Romagna, Italy
- Parent range: Ligurian Apennines

Monte Groppo Rosso is a mountain in Liguria, northern Italy, part of the Ligurian Apennines. It is located in the provinces of Genoa and Piacenza. It lies at an altitude of 1597 metres.
