= Alessandro Repetto =

Italian politician (born 1940)

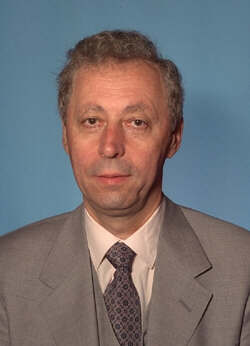

President of the Province of Genoa
- In office 28 May 2002 – 10 May 2012
- Preceded by: Marta Vincenzi
- Succeeded by: Office abolished

Member of the Chamber of Deputies
- In office 9 May 1996 – 29 May 2001

Personal details
- Born: Alessandro Giovanni Repetto; 7 April 1940 Carpeneto, Province of Alessandria, Kingdom of Italy
- Party: Italian People's Party; The Daisy; Democratic Party
- Profession: Banker

Alessandro Giovanni Repetto (born 7 April 1940) is an Italian politician and banker. A member of the Italian People's Party, The Daisy and later the Democratic Party, he served as a member of the Chamber of Deputies from 1996 to 2001 and as the last president of the Province of Genoa from 2002 to 2012.
