= Lago del Brugneto =

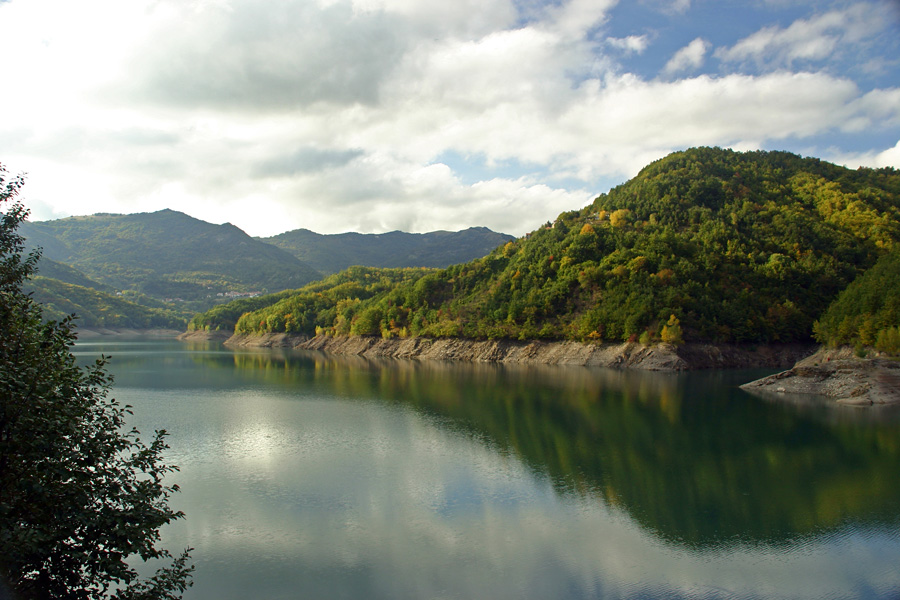

- Location within Italy
- Location: Province of Genova, Liguria
- Coordinates: 44°32′22″N 9°11′31″E
- Type: artificial lake
- Primary inflows: Brugneto
- Primary outflows: artificial channel
- Basin countries: Italy
- Built: 1958
- Surface area: 0.97 km^{2} (0.37 sq mi)
- Surface elevation: 775.8 m (2,545 ft)

Lago del Brugneto is a lake in the Province of Genova, Liguria, Italy. At an elevation of 775.8 m, its surface area is 0.97 km^{2}.

== See also ==
- Lago del Brugneto in Italian
