= Caprioglio =

Caprioglio is an Italian surname. Notable people with the surname include:

- Debora Caprioglio (born 1968), Italian actress
- Ilaria Caprioglio (born 1969), Italian politician

== See also ==
- Capriglio
