= Senator Abate =

Senator Abate may refer to:

- Catherine M. Abate (1947–2014), former New York State Senator
- Rosa Silvana Abate (born 1963), Italian politician; serving as a senator
