= Tarello =

Tarello is a surname. Notable people with the surname include:

- Camillo Tarello (ca. 1513 - 1573), Venetian agronomist
- Giovanni Tarello (1934-1987) Italian lawyer, university professor and Mayor of Genoa 1946-48
- Law Tarello, Television and Broadway Actor.
- Mark Tarello, chief meteorologist seen weeknights at KEYC-TV
