= Bric del Terma =

Mountain in Italy

- Location within Italy

Highest point
- Elevation: 760 m (2,490 ft)
- Coordinates: 44°30′19″N 8°46′09″E

Geography
- Location: Liguria and Piedmont, Italy
- Parent range: Ligurian Apennines

Bric del Terma is a mountain in Liguria, northern Italy, and is part of the Ligurian Apennines. It is located in the provinces of Genoa and Alessandria, and lies at an altitude of 760 metres (2,490 ft).
