= Armando Magliotto =

Italian politician (1927–2005)

President of Liguria
- In office 5 July 1979 – 27 October 1980
- Preceded by: Angelo Carossino
- Succeeded by: Giovanni Persico

President of the Regional Council of Liguria
- In office November 1980 – September 1981
- Preceded by: Angelo Landi
- Succeeded by: Fausto Cuocolo

Mayor of Savona
- In office 3 August 1990 – 21 October 1992
- Preceded by: Bruno Marengo
- Succeeded by: Sergio Tortarolo

Personal details
- Born: 26 October 1927 Villefranche-sur-Mer, France
- Died: 4 November 2005 (aged 78) Savona, Liguria, Italy
- Party: Italian Communist Party; Democratic Party of the Left

Armando Magliotto (26 October 1927 – 4 November 2005) was an Italian politician who served as president of Liguria (1979–1980), president of the Regional Council of Liguria (1980–1981) and mayor of Savona (1990–1992).

== Life and career ==
During the Resistance, he was a member of the 4th Garibaldi Partisan Brigade, and his nom de guerre was "Baracca".

In the postwar period, he worked as a laborer and trade unionist with the Italian Federation of Metalworkers, first as a member of the sectoral executive committee and then, starting in 1955, as the Savona sectoral secretary. In October 1961, he became general secretary of the CGIL Labor Chamber of Savona, a position he held until 1970.

In 1962, he had joined the Central Committee of the Italian Communist Party, and through that party he was elected regional councilor in Liguria in 1970 and 1975. From July 1979 to October 1980, he served as president of Liguria, and from November of that year until September 1981, he served as president of the Regional Council of Liguria. He was re-elected for a final term as a regional councilor in 1985, remaining in office until 1990. In the summer of that year, he became mayor of Savona, a position he held until October 1992. After the dissolution of the PCI, he joined the Democratic Party of the Left.

He died in November 2005 at the age of 77.

== Sources ==
- Miniati, Emanuela (2017). Un politico d'antan. Armando Magliotto fra partito, sindacato ed enti locali (1927-2005). Rome: Ediesse.

Political offices
| Preceded by Angelo Carossino | President of Liguria; 1979–1980 | Succeeded by Giovanni Persico |
| Preceded by Bruno Marengo | Mayor of Savona; 1990–1992 | Succeeded by Sergio Tortarolo |
