= Monte Caucaso (Liguria) =

Mountain in Italy

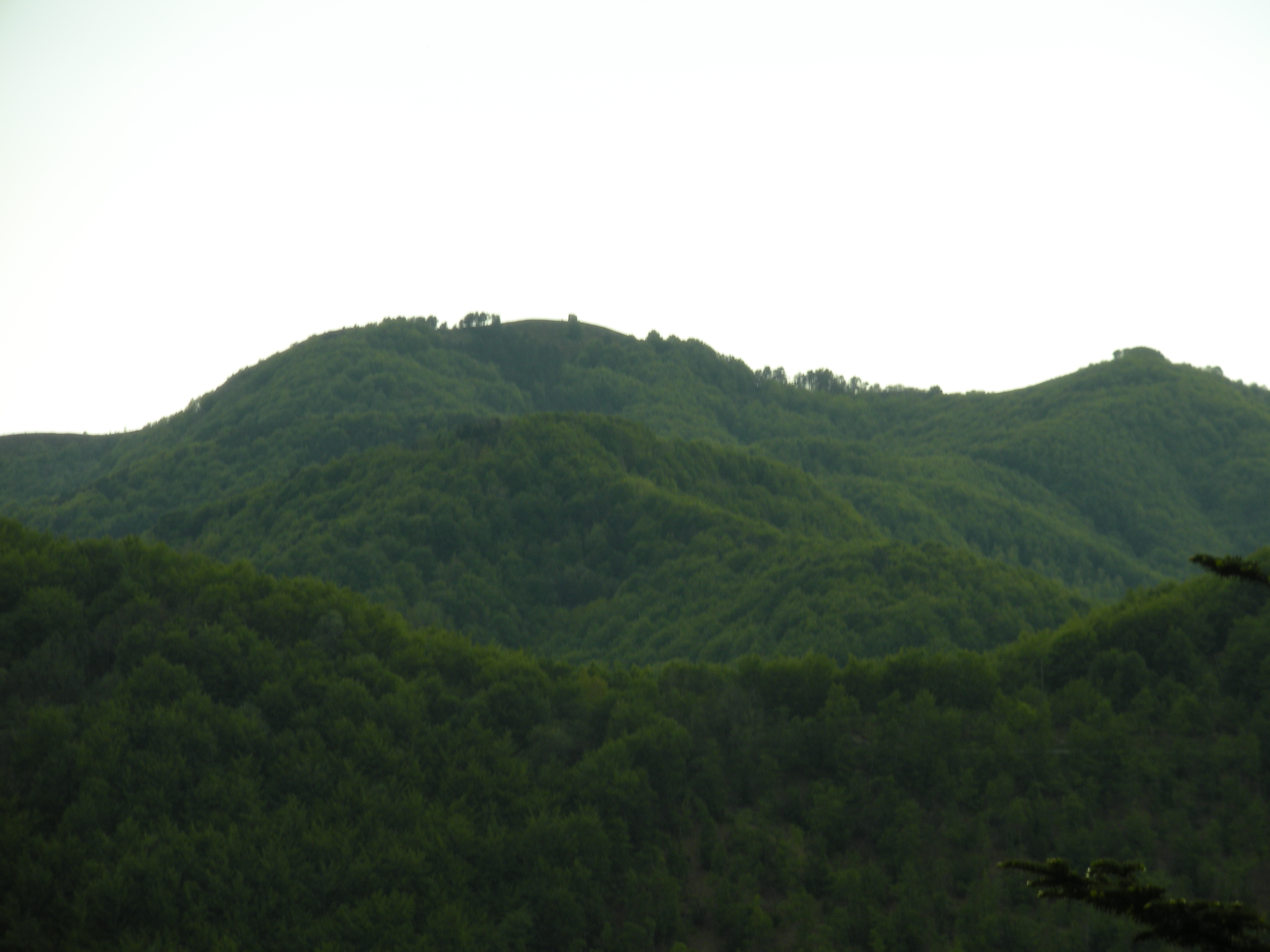

Highest point
- Elevation: 1,245 m (4,085 ft)
- Prominence: 167 m (548 ft)
- Coordinates: 44°27′24″N 9°13′35″E

Geography
- Location within Italy
- Location: Liguria, Italy
- Parent range: Ligurian Apennines

Monte Caucaso is a mountain in Liguria, northern Italy, part of the Ligurian Apennines. It is located in the province of Genoa. It lies at an altitude of 1245 metres.

== Nature conservation ==
The mountain and its surrounding area are included in a SIC (Site of Community Importance) called Monte Caucaso (code IT1331811).
