= Dessì =

Dessì is an Italian surname, and may refer to:

- Daniela Dessì (1957–2016), Italian soprano
- Emanuele Dessì (born 1964), Italian politician
- Giuseppe Dessì (1909–1977), Italian writer from Sardinia
