= Salvatore Deidda =

Italian politician (born 1976)

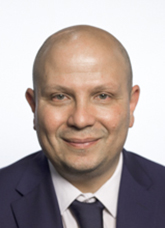
- Deidda in 2018

Member of the Chamber of Deputies
- Incumbent
- Assumed office 23 March 2018
- Constituency: Sardinia

Personal details
- Born: 7 October 1976 (age 49)
- Party: Brothers of Italy

Salvatore Deidda (born 7 October 1976) is an Italian politician of Brothers of Italy serving as a member of the Chamber of Deputies. He was first elected in the 2018 general election, and was re-elected in 2022. Since 2022, he has chaired the Transport Committee.
