= Italy Tomorrow =

Italy Tomorrow Italia Domani
- Abbreviation: ID
- Leader: Marco Rizzo
- Secretary: Francesca Antinozzi
- President: Bruno Scapini
- Founded: 3 October 2026
- Split from: Sovereign Popular Democracy
- Ideology: Populism; Sovereigntism; Hard Euroscepticism
- Political position: Big tent (claimed)
- Chamber of Deputies: 0 / 400
- Senate: 0 / 200
- European Parliament: 0 / 76
- Regional Councils: 0 / 896

Website
- www.italiadomanirizzo.it

Italy Tomorrow (Italian: Italia Domani, ID) is a populist, sovereignist and Eurosceptic political party in Italy formed in October 2026 by Marco Rizzo. The party claims to be neither right-wing nor left-wing, but to fight against the establishment.

== History ==
Italy Tomorrow was founded in 2026 by Marco Rizzo following his departure from Sovereign Popular Democracy (DSP), which he had co-founded in 2023 with Francesco Toscano. The split followed disagreements over the party's political strategy and its relationship with Roberto Vannacci and his political movement, National Future.

On 3 September 2026, Rizzo officially presented Italy Tomorrow at the Chamber of Deputies. The movement advocated overcoming the traditional left–right political divide, while emphasizing national sovereignty, neutrality in foreign policy, opposition to sending weapons to Ukraine, protection of workers and small businesses, and stronger controls on immigration.

The party's founding congress was held on 3 October 2026 in Rome. Rizzo was appointed political leader, while Bruno Scapini became President of the National Assembly and Francesca Antinozzi was appointed head of the National Secretariat. The congress formally established the party's organisational structure and political programme.

On 23 October, Antonio Guidi, a senator from Brothers of Italy (FdI), formed a new autonomous sub-group of the Mixed Group for Italy Tomorrow.

== Leadership ==
- Leader: Marco Rizzo (2026–present)
- Secretary: Francesca Antinozzi (2026–present)
- President of the National Assembly: Bruno Scapini (2026–present)
