= List of mayors of Savona =

Mayor of Savona
- Sindaco di Savona
- Incumbent; Marco Russo since 20 October 2021
- Appointer: Popular election
- Term length: 5 years, renewable once
- Formation: 1860
- Website: Official website

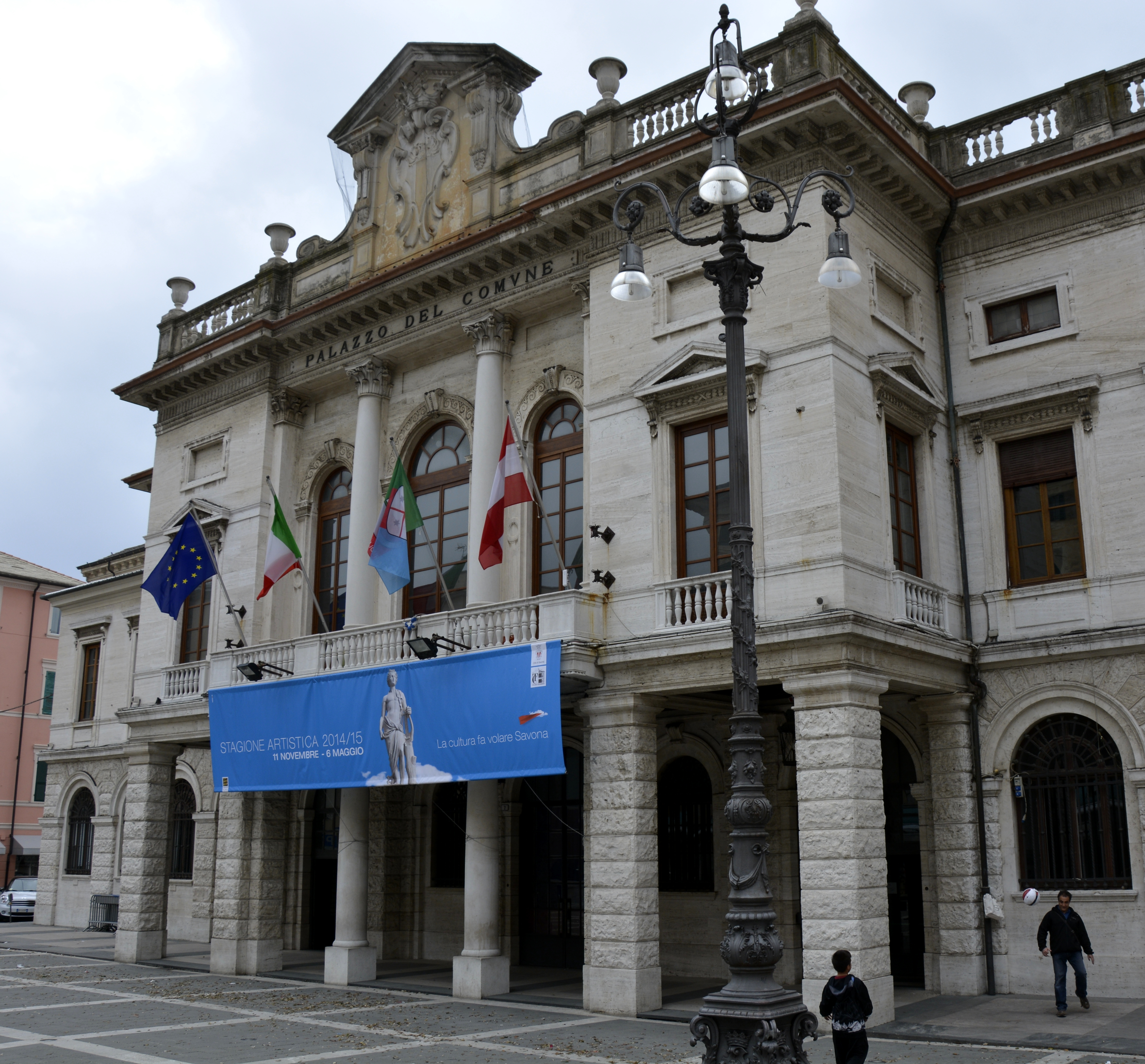
Savona's Town Hall.

The Mayor of Savona is an elected politician who, along with the Savona's City Council, is accountable for the strategic government of Savona in Liguria, Italy.

== Overview ==
According to the Italian Constitution, the Mayor of Savona is member of the City Council.

The Mayor is elected by the population of Savona, who also elects the members of the City Council, controlling the Mayor's policy guidelines and is able to enforce his resignation by a motion of no confidence. The Mayor is entitled to appoint and release the members of his government.

Since 1994 the Mayor is elected directly by Savona's electorate: in all mayoral elections in Italy in cities with a population higher than 15,000 the voters express a direct choice for the mayor or an indirect choice voting for the party of the candidate's coalition. If no candidate receives at least 50% of votes, the top two candidates go to a second round after two weeks. The election of the City Council is based on a direct choice for the candidate with a preference vote: the candidate with the majority of the preferences is elected. The number of the seats for each party is determined proportionally.

== Italian Republic (since 1946) ==
=== City Council election (1946–1994) ===
From 1946 to 1994, the Mayor of Savona was elected by the City's Council.

	Mayor	Term start	Term end	Party
1	Andrea Serafino Aglietto	1946	1953	PCI
2	Amilcare Lunardelli	1953	1957	PCI
3	Giovanni Battista Urbani	1957	1958	PCI
4	Angelo Carossino	1958	1967	PCI
5	Benedetto Martinengo	1967	1968	PSI
6	Carlo Zanelli	1968	1982	PSI
7	Umberto Scardaoni	1982	1987	PCI
8	Bruno Marengo	1987	1990	PCI
9	Armando Magliotto	1990	1992	PCI
10	Sergio Tortarolo	1992	1994	PDS

=== Direct election (since 1994) ===
Since 1994, under provisions of new local administration law, the Mayor of Savona is chosen by direct election.

	Mayor	Term start	Term end	Party	Coalition	Election
11	Francesco Gervasio	26 June 1994	24 May 1998	FI	FI • LN • PPI	1994
12	Carlo Ruggeri	24 May 1998	26 May 2002	DS	DS • PRC • SDI • FdV	1998
12	Carlo Ruggeri	26 May 2002	17 May 2005	DS	DS • DL • SDI • FdV • PdCI	2002
—	Francesco Lirosi (Note: As deputy Mayor.)	17 May 2005	30 May 2006	DS	DS • DL • SDI • FdV • PdCI	2002
13	Federico Berruti	30 May 2006	16 May 2011	DS; PD	DS • DL • PRC • PdCI	2006
13	Federico Berruti	16 May 2011	22 June 2016	DS; PD	PD • FdS • SEL • IdV	2011
14	Ilaria Caprioglio	22 June 2016	20 October 2021	Ind	LN • FI • FdI	2016
15	Marco Russo	20 October 2021	Incumbent	PD	PD • SI • +E • IV	2021

== Bibliography ==
- Savona 1960-2002. Gli amministratori della città. Savona: Sabatelli. 2002.
