= Sovereign Popular Democracy =

Sovereign Popular Democracy Democrazia Sovrana Popolare
- Abbreviation: DSP
- President: Francesco Toscano
- Founded: 22 January 2023
- Preceded by: Sovereign and Popular Italy
- Ideology: Populism; Sovereigntism; Hard Euroscepticism
- Political position: Big tent (claimed)
- Chamber of Deputies: 0 / 400
- Senate: 0 / 200
- European Parliament: 0 / 76
- Regional Councils: 0 / 896

Website
- partitodsp.it

Sovereign Popular Democracy (Italian: Democrazia Sovrana Popolare, DSP) is a populist, sovereignist and Eurosceptic political party in Italy, formed in January 2023. The party, whose roots are in the Sovereign and Popular Italy electoral list and whose original leader was Marco Rizzo, claims to be neither right-wing nor left-wing.

== History ==
After participating in the 2022 Italian general election under the name Sovereign and Popular Italy, the list was officially dissolved in December 2022 by mutual agreement of its leaders, Marco Rizzo and Francesco Toscano. This happened after Francesco Toscano left his party, Italy Again, to launch a new party called Sovereign and Popular Italy Again (AISP).

On 13 January 2023, the National Political Committee of Sovereign Popular Democracy was elected in Rome, followed by the election of the Scientific Committee on 14 January. On 22 January, Marco Rizzo officially launched the party on YouTube. The party includes Marco Rizzo's Communist Party, Francesco Toscano's Sovereign and Popular Italy Again, Gilberto Trombetta's Front for Popular Sovereignty (a split from Reconquer Italy, which had previously participated in ISP), and Antonio Ingroia's Civil Action.

In July, Gilberto Trombetta and Enrico Bonfatti denounced on social media the expulsion of Trombetta and his party from DSP, as well as the expulsion of Civil Action, CLNI, FISI and the former senator Bianca Laura Granato, who was the president of AISP. The latter was expelled after writing a letter to Secretary Rizzo in defense of Trombetta. For Popular Sovereign Democracy he ran for the presidency of the autonomous province of Trento in the 2023 Trentino-Alto Adige/Südtirol provincial elections, taking just over 2% (over 5,000 votes), which is not enough to be elected councilor..

Between 27 and 28 January 2024, the founding congress of Sovereign Popular Democracy was held, with Rizzo being elected national coordinator. In the same period, "The Reasons for a Choice. For a Sovereign and Popular Democracy", a book written with Francesco Toscano, was published.

The hypothesis of joining the Freedom list promoted by Cateno De Luca of South calls Nord having faded away, DSP will not be able to collect the necessary signatures to present the lists for the 2024 European elections in all the constituencies, managing, thanks to the support of Gianni Alemanno, to present itself only in the central one where Rizzo, as head of the list, collects over 6,500 preferences contributing to the total 0.15% of the list. Alemanno and Rizzo together support the DSP candidate Daniele Giovanardi (1.40%) in the municipal elections of Modena and also Patrizio Sgarra in Giaveno (1.59%).

On July 6, 2024, the Central Committee of the Communist Party announced that Rizzo had resigned from his position as Honorary President of the party and that, from that moment on, members of the Communist Party may no longer simultaneously be members of Sovereign Popular Democracy.

Rizzo then ran for the presidency of Umbria in the 2024 Umbrian regional election on 17-18 November with Sovereign Popular Democracy and Reformist Alternative. Having presented himself with two lists, Rizzo, with 1.11%, placed third behind the two candidates of the centre-left and centre-right coalitions, but was not elected. In October 2025, Rizzo announced his candidacy also in the 2025 Venetian regional election at the end of November, placing fourth with 1.09%.

On July 30, 2026, Rizzo resigned as coordinator and left the party, after a dispute with Toscano and being outvoted at the congress regarding a possible alliance with Roberto Vannacci. After a few weeks he founded a new party, Italy Tomorrow.

== Election results ==
=== European Parliament ===
Election	Leader	Votes	%	Seats	+/–	EP Group
2024	Marco Rizzo	36,225 (13th)	0.15	0 / 76	New	–

== Symbols ==
2023–2025

2025–2026

2026–
