= Paola Deiana =

Italian politician (born 1985)

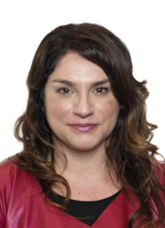
- Paola Deiana in 2018

Member of the Chamber of Deputies
- In office 23 March 2018 – 13 October 2022
- Constituency: Sardinia

Personal details
- Born: 5 April 1985 (age 41) Alghero, Italy
- Party: Independent (since 2022)
- Other political affiliations: Together for the Future (2022); Five Star Movement (until 2022)
- Education: University of Sassari
- Website: www.paoladeiana.it

Paola Deiana (born 5 April 1985) is an Italian politician. She was a member of the Chamber of Deputies of the Italian Parliament from 2018 to 2022. She was elected in the 2018 Italian general election for the Five Star Movement. On 21 June 2022 she left to join Together for the Future, following the split led by Minister of Foreign Affairs Luigi Di Maio.

== See also ==
- List of members of the Chamber of Deputies of Italy, 2018–2022
