= List of mayors of Genoa =

Mayor of Genoa
- Sindaco di Genova

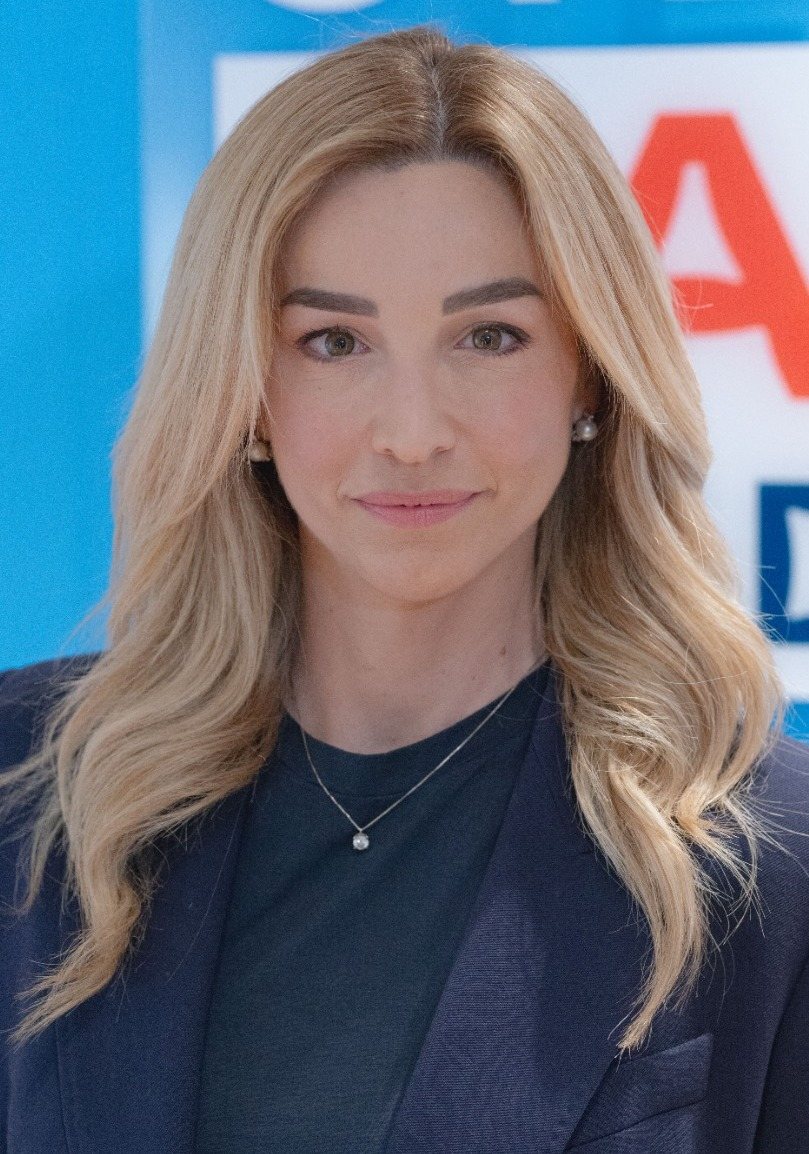
- Incumbent; Silvia Salis since 30 May 2025
- Seat: Palazzo Doria-Tursi
- Appointer: Electorate of Genoa
- Term length: 5 years, renewable once
- Inaugural holder: Antonio Profumo
- Formation: 15 March 1849
- Deputy: Massimo Nicolò
- Salary: €88,428 annually
- Website: comune.genova.it

The mayor of Genoa (Italian: sindaco di Genova) is an elected politician who, along with the Genoa City Council of 40 members, is accountable for the strategic government of the municipality of Genoa, Liguria, Italy.

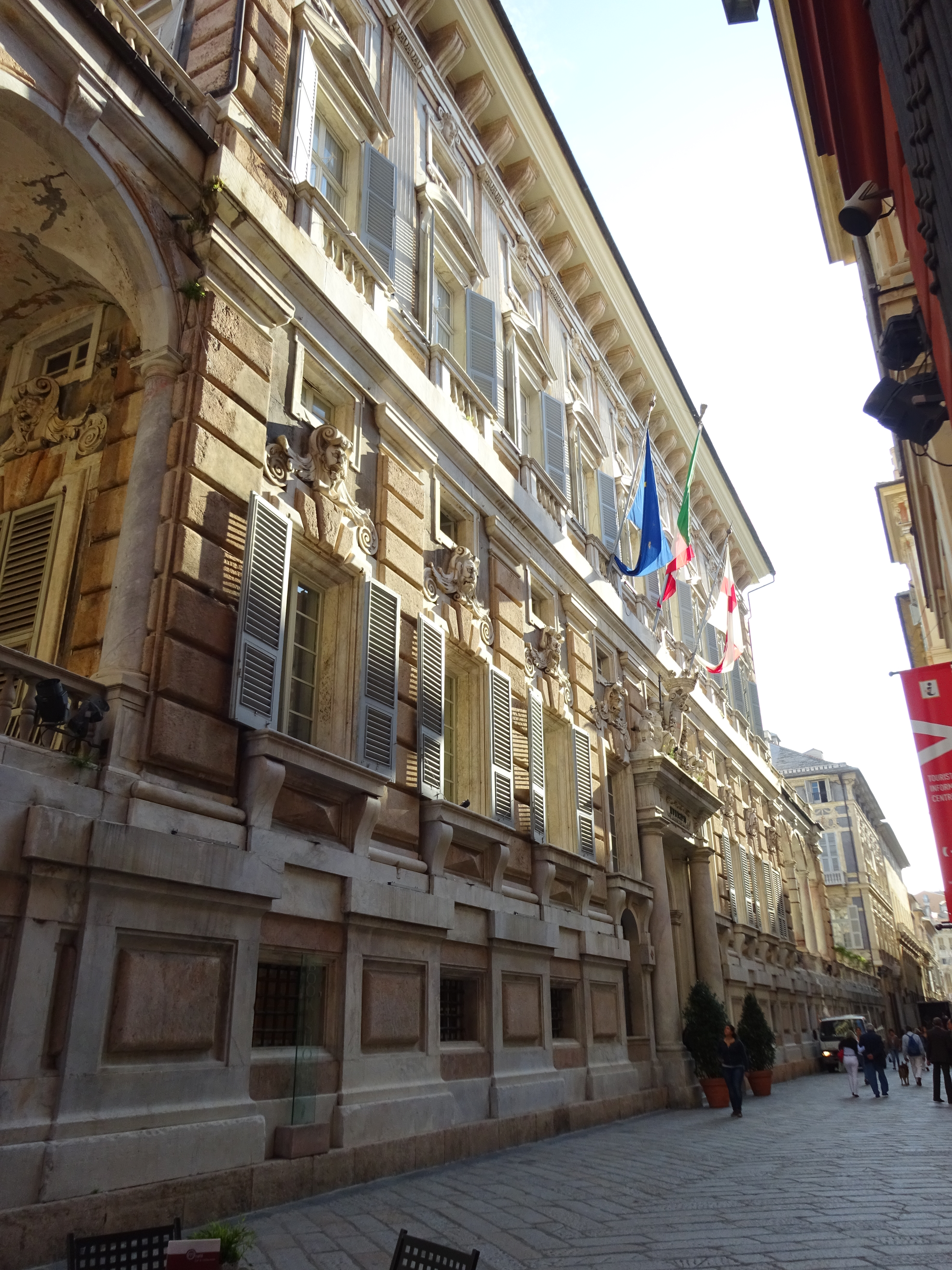
Palazzo Doria-Tursi, Genoa City Hall.

== List of Mayors of Genoa ==
=== Kingdom of Piedmont-Sardinia (1848-1861) ===
In 1848 the Kingdom of Piedmont-Sardinia created the office of the Mayor of Genoa (Sindaco di Genova), chosen by Genoa citizens.

| | Mayor | Term start | Term end | Party |
|---|---|---|---|---|
| 1 | Antonio Profumo | 15 March 1849 | 22 December 1851 | Right |
| 2 | Stefano Centurione | 22 December 1851 | 1 March 1853 | Right |
| 3 | Domenico Elena | 1 March 1853 | 22 October 1856 | Right |
| 4 | Giuseppe Morro | 22 October 1856 | 25 February 1860 | Right |
| 5 | Ludovico Pallavicino | 25 February 1860 | 12 December 1860 | Right |
| 6 | Gerolamo Gavotti | 12 December 1860 | 26 December 1861 | Right |

=== Kingdom of Italy (1861-1946) ===
In 1861 the Kingdom of Italy continued the previous office, chosen by the City council. In 1926, the Fascist dictatorship abolished mayors and City councils, replacing them with an authoritarian Podestà chosen by the National Fascist Party.

| | Mayor | Term start | Term end | Party |
|---|---|---|---|---|
| 1 | Gerolamo Gavotti | 26 December 1861 | 20 August 1864 | Right |
| 2 | Luigi Gropallo | 20 August 1864 | 18 January 1866 | Right |
| 3 | Andrea Podestà | 18 January 1866 | 30 June 1876 | Right |
| 4 | Lazzaro Negrotto Cambiaso | 30 June 1876 | 9 January 1879 | Independent |
| 5 | Enrico Parodi | 9 January 1879 | 31 December 1883 | Right |
| (3) | Andrea Podestà | 31 December 1883 | 27 May 1888 | Right |
| 6 | Stefano Castagnola | 27 May 1888 | 16 March 1891 | Right |
| 7 | Giacomo Doria | 16 March 1891 | 23 January 1892 | Independent |
| (3) | Andrea Podestà | 23 January 1892 | 20 July 1895 | Right |
| 8 | Raffaele Pratolongo | 20 July 1895 | 13 May 1896 | Left |
| 9 | Francesco Pozzo | 13 May 1896 | 14 April 1903 | Left |
| 10 | Giovanni Battista Boragini | 14 April 1903 | 25 January 1905 | Left |
| 11 | Alberto Cerruti | 25 January 1905 | 18 July 1906 | Independent |
| 12 | Gerolamo Da Passano | 18 July 1906 | 6 August 1910 | Right |
| 13 | Giacomo Grasso | 6 August 1910 | 2 July 1914 | Liberal |
| 12 | Emilio Massone | 2 July 1914 | 27 November 1920 | Liberal |
| 13 | Federico Ricci | 27 November 1920 | 16 December 1926 | Independent |
Fascist Podestà (1926-1945)
| 1 | Eugenio Broccardi | 16 December 1926 | 7 September 1933 | PNF |
| 2 | Carlo Bombrini | 7 September 1933 | 19 March 1940 | PNF |
| 3 | Aldo Gardini | 19 March 1940 | 6 November 1944 | PNF |
| 4 | Giulio Segoni | 6 November 1944 | 25 April 1945 | PFR |
Liberation (1945-1946)
| 14 | Vannuccio Faralli | 25 April 1945 | 4 December 1946 | PSI |

=== Republic of Italy (1946-present) ===
From 1945 to 1993, the Mayor of Genoa was chosen by the City Council.

| Mayor | | Term start | Term end | Party | Coalition | Election |
|---|---|---|---|---|---|---|
| 1 | Giovanni Tarello | 4 December 1946 | 23 February 1948 | PCI | PCI • PSI | 1946 |
| 2 | Gelasio Adamoli | 23 February 1948 | 16 June 1951 | PCI | PCI • PSI | 1946 |
| 3 | Vittorio Pertusio | 16 June 1951 | 2 July 1956 | DC | DC | 1951 |
| 3 | Vittorio Pertusio | 2 July 1956 | 27 May 1960 | DC | DC | 1956 |
| - | Special Prefectural Commissioner tenure (27 May 1960–8 February 1961) (Note: Nominated by the Prefect after the City Council failed to elect a new Mayor after the resignation of the previous one.) | | | | | |
| (3) | Vittorio Pertusio | 8 February 1961 | 2 February 1965 | DC | DC | 1960 |
| 4 | Augusto Pedullà | 2 February 1965 | 5 January 1966 | DC | DC | 1964 |
| - | Special Prefectural Commissioner tenure (5 January 1966–14 July 1966) (Note: Nominated by the Prefect after the City Council failed to elect a new Mayor after the resignation of the previous one.) | | | | | |
| (4) | Augusto Pedullà | 14 July 1966 | 15 October 1971 | DC | DC • PSI | 1966 |
| 5 | Giancarlo Piombino | 15 October 1971 | 2 April 1975 | DC | DC • PSI | 1971 |
| 6 | Fulvio Cerofolini | 2 April 1975 | 2 August 1976 | PSI | PCI • PSI | 1971 |
| 6 | Fulvio Cerofolini | 2 August 1976 | 21 September 1981 | PSI | PCI • PSI | 1976 |
| 6 | Fulvio Cerofolini | 21 September 1981 | 13 October 1985 | PSI | PCI • PSI • PSDI (Note: With the external support of the Radical Party and the Proletarian Unity Party (PdUP).) | 1981 |
| 7 | Cesare Campart | 13 October 1985 | 2 August 1990 | PRI | DC • PSI • PSDI • PRI • PLI | 1985 |
| 8 | Romano Merlo | 2 August 1990 | 3 December 1992 | PSDI | PCI • PSI • PSDI • PRI | 1990 |
| 9 | Claudio Burlando | 3 December 1992 | 19 May 1993 | PDS | PDS • PSI • PSDI | 1990 |
| - | Special Prefectural Commissioner tenure (19 May 1993 – 7 December 1993) (Note: Nominated by the Prefect after the Mayor and the members of the City Council resigned in order to hold a new election under the provision of the new local electoral law.) | | | | | |

==== Direct election (since 1993) ====
Since 1993, under provisions of new local administration law, the Mayor of Genoa is chosen by direct election, originally every four then every five years.

| Mayor of Genoa | | Took office | Left office | Party | Coalition | Election |
|---|---|---|---|---|---|---|
| 10 | Adriano Sansa (b. 1940) | 7 December 1993 | 1 December 1997 | Ind | PDS • AD • FdV | 1993 |
| 11 | Giuseppe Pericu (1937–2022) | 1 December 1997 | 28 May 2002 | PDS; DS | The Olive Tree (PDS-PPI-PRC-RI) | 1997 |
| 11 | Giuseppe Pericu (1937–2022) | 28 May 2002 | 30 May 2007 | PDS; DS | The Olive Tree (DS-DL-PRC-PdCI-FdV) | 2002 |
| 12 | Marta Vincenzi (b. 1947) | 30 May 2007 | 21 May 2012 | DS; PD | The Union (DS-DL-PRC-PdCI-FdV-IdV) | 2007 |
| 13 | Marco Doria (b. 1957) | 21 May 2012 | 27 June 2017 | SEL | PD • SEL • FdS | 2012 |
| 14 | Marco Bucci (b. 1959) | 27 June 2017 | 17 June 2022 | Ind | FI • LN • FdI • DI | 2017 |
| 14 | Marco Bucci (b. 1959) | 17 June 2022 | 10 December 2024 (Note: Resigned after being elected President of Liguria. The Deputy Mayor Pietro Piciocchi (FdI) held the office till a new municipal election was held.) | Ind | FI • L • FdI • C! • IV • UDC | 2022 |
| 15 | Silvia Salis (b. 1985) | 30 May 2025 | Incumbent | Ind | PD • AVS • M5S • IV | 2025 |

== Elections ==
=== Mayoral and City Council election, 1993 ===
The election took place in two rounds: the first on 21 November, the second on 5 December 1993.

Results

Summary of the 1993 Genoa City Council election results
| Parties and coalitions | | Votes | % | Seats |
|---|---|---|---|---|
| Democratic Party of the Left (Partito Democratico della Sinistra) | PDS | 98,026 | 26.19% | 22 |
| Federation of the Greens (Federazione dei Verdi) | FdV | 13,227 | 3.55% | 3 |
| Democratic Alliance (Alleanza Democratica) | AD | 12,255 | 3.27% | 2 |
| Pannella List (Lista Pannella) | LP | 7,962 | 2.13% | 1 |
| The Network (La Rete) | LR | 6,558 | 1.75% | 1 |
| Others | | 5,765 | 1.54% | 1 |
| Sansa coalition (Left-wing) | | 143,843 | 38.43% | 30 |
| Lega Nord | LN | 108,562 | 29.01% | 10 |
| Christian Democracy (Democrazia Cristiana) | DC | 33,604 | 8.98% | 4 |
| Socialist Rebirth (Rinascita Socialista) | RS | 14,840 | 3.96% | 1 |
| Union of the Centre (Unione di Centro) | UdC | 6,975 | 1.86% | 0 |
| Signorini coalition (Centre) | | 55,419 | 14.81% | 5 |
| Communist Refoundation Party (Rifondazione Comunista) | PRC | 32,238 | 8.61% | 3 |
| Italian Social Movement (Movimento Sociale Italiano) | MSI-DN | 25,213 | 6.74% | 2 |
| Others | | 9,004 | 2.41% | 0 |
| Total | | 374,279 | 100% | 50 |
| Votes cast / turnout | | 472,436 | 78.93% | |
| Registered voters | | 598,584 | | |
Source: Ministry of the Interior

| Candidate | Party | Coalition | First round | | Second round | |
| Candidate | Party | Coalition | Votes | % | Votes | % |
|---|---|---|---|---|---|---|
| Adriano Sansa | Ind | Progressives | 189,874 | 42.93 | 247,547 | 59.17 |
| Enrico Serra | LN | | 116,973 | 26.45 | 170,799 | 40.83 |
| Ugo Signorini | DC | DC-RS-UdC | 66,387 | 15.01 | | |
| Giuliano Boffardi | PRC | | 32,498 | 7.35 | | |
| Vincenzo Plinio | MSI-DN | | 27,252 | 6.16 | | |
| Others | | | 9,260 | 2.10 | | |
| Eligible voters | | | 598,584 | 100.00 | 598,584 | 100.00 |
| Voted | | | 472,436 | 78.93 | 439,769 | 73.47 |
| Blank or invalid ballots | | | 30,192 | | 21,423 | |
| Total valid votes | | | 442,244 | | 418,346 | |

=== Mayoral and City Council election, 1997 ===
The election took place on two rounds: the first on 16 November, the second on 30 November 1997.

Results

Summary of the 1997 Genoa City Council election results
| Parties and coalitions | | Votes | % | Seats |
|---|---|---|---|---|
| Democratic Party of the Left (Partito Democratico della Sinistra) | PDS | 84,635 | 25.91% | 17 |
| Communist Refoundation Party (Rifondazione Comunista) (Note: Officially endorsed the centre-left candidate only on the second round.) | PRC | 31,093 | 9.52% | 6 |
| Italian People's Party (Partito Popolare Italiano) | PPI | 19,965 | 6.11% | 4 |
| Italian Renewal (Rinnovamento Italiano) | RI | 6,223 | 1.91% | 1 |
| Others | | 10,018 | 3.06% | 2 |
| Pericu coalition (Centre-left) | | 151,934 | 46.51% | 30 |
| Forza Italia | FI | 42,170 | 12.91% | 6 |
| National Alliance (Alleanza Nazionale) | AN | 18,265 | 5.59% | 2 |
| Christian Democratic Centre (Centro Cristiano Democratico) | CCD | 7,524 | 2.30% | 0 |
| Eva coalition (Centre-right) | | 67,959 | 20.80% | 8 |
| New Genoa (Genova Nuova) | GN | 55,947 | 17.13% | 7 |
| Sansa for Genoa (Sansa per Genova) | SpG | 36,186 | 11.08% | 4 |
| Lega Nord | LN | 11,481 | 3.51% | 1 |
| Others | | 3,155 | 0.97% | 0 |
| Total | | 326,662 | 100.00% | 50 |
| Votes cast / turnout | | 400,823 | 69.88% | |
| Registered voters | | 573,607 | | |
Source: Ministry of the Interior

| Candidate | Party | Coalition | First round | | Second round | |
| Candidate | Party | Coalition | Votes | % | Votes | % |
|---|---|---|---|---|---|---|
| Giuseppe Pericu | PDS | The Olive Tree | 129,680 | 34.38 | 170,211 | 51.52 |
| Sergio Castellaneta | GN | | 75,042 | 19.90 | 160,140 | 48.48 |
| Claudio Eva | FI | Pole for Freedoms | 73,979 | 19.61 | | |
| Adriano Sansa | SpG | | 51,904 | 13.76 | | |
| Giordano Bruschi | PRC | | 31,809 | 8.43 | | |
| Giacomo Chiappori | LN | | 11,265 | 2.99 | | |
| Others | | | 3,505 | 0.93 | | |
| Eligible voters | | | 573,607 | 100.00 | 573,607 | 100.00 |
| Voted | | | 400,823 | 69.88 | 341,362 | 59.51 |
| Blank or invalid ballots | | | 23,639 | | 11,011 | |
| Total valid votes | | | 377,184 | | 330,351 | |

=== Mayoral and City Council election, 2002 ===
The election took place on 26 May 2002.

Results

Summary of the 2002 Genoa City Council election results
| Parties and coalitions | | Votes | % | Seats |
|---|---|---|---|---|
| Democrats of the Left (Democratici di Sinistra) | DS | 102,944 | 35.19% | 20 |
| The Daisy (La Margherita) | DL | 27,166 | 9.29% | 5 |
| Communist Refoundation Party (Rifondazione Comunista) | PRC | 21,369 | 7.30% | 4 |
| Federation of the Greens (Federazione dei Verdi) | FdV | 6,399 | 2.19% | 1 |
| Party of Italian Communists (Comunisti Italiani) | PdCI | 5,176 | 1.77% | 1 |
| Others | | 9,691 | 3.32% | 0 |
| Pericu coalition (Centre-left) | | 172,745 | 59.05% | 31 |
| Forza Italia | FI | 49,609 | 16.96% | 9 |
| National Alliance (Alleanza Nazionale) | AN | 17,121 | 5.85% | 3 |
| Union of the Centre (Unione di Centro) | UDC | 6,867 | 2.35% | 1 |
| Magnani coalition (Centre-right) | | 73,597 | 25.16% | 13 |
| New Genoa (Genova Nuova) | GN | 23,198 | 7.93% | 5 |
| Lega Nord | LN | 9,405 | 3.22% | 1 |
| Castellaneta coalition | | 32,603 | 11.15% | 6 |
| Others | | 13,585 | 4.64% | 0 |
| Total | | 292,530 | 100.00% | 50 |
| Votes cast / turnout | | 367,746 | 67.25% | |
| Registered voters | | 546,834 | | |
Source: Ministry of the Interior

| Candidate | Party | Coalition | First round | |
| Candidate | Party | Coalition | Votes | % |
|---|---|---|---|---|
| Giuseppe Pericu | DS | The Olive Tree | 210,541 | 60.03 |
| Rinaldo Magnani | FI | House of Freedoms | 79,856 | 22.77 |
| Sergio Castellaneta | GN | GN-LN | 45,101 | 12.86 |
| Others | | | 15,230 | 4.34 |
| Eligible voters | | | 546,834 | 100.00 |
| Voted | | | 367,746 | 67.25 |
| Blank or invalid ballots | | | 17,018 | |
| Total valid votes | | | 350,728 | |

=== Mayoral and City Council election, 2007 ===
The election took place on 27–28 May 2007.

Results

Summary of the 2007 Genoa City Council election results
| Parties and coalitions | | Votes | % | Seats |
|---|---|---|---|---|
| The Olive Tree (L'Ulivo) | | 89,337 | 34.60% | 22 |
| Communist Refoundation Party (Rifondazione Comunista) | PRC | 15,615 | 6.05% | 3 |
| Italy of Values (Italia dei Valori) | IdV | 9,296 | 3.60% | 2 |
| Party of Italian Communists (Comunisti Italiani) | PdCI | 6,447 | 2.50% | 1 |
| Federation of the Greens (Federazione dei Verdi) | FdV | 5,768 | 2.23% | 1 |
| Others | | 11,272 | 4.36% | 1 |
| Vincenzi coalition (Centre-left) | | 137,735 | 53.34% | 30 |
| Forza Italia | FI | 58,396 | 22.61% | 12 |
| Biasotti List (Lista Biasotti) | LB | 18,724 | 7.25% | 3 |
| National Alliance (Alleanza Nazionale) | AN | 16,117 | 6.24% | 3 |
| Lega Nord | LN | 9,340 | 3.62% | 1 |
| Union of the Centre (Unione di Centro) | UDC | 8,170 | 3.16% | 1 |
| Pensioners' Party (Partito Pensionati) | PP | 1,932 | 0.75% | 0 |
| Musso coalition (Centre-right) | | 112,679 | 43.64% | 20 |
| Others | | 7,813 | 3.02% | 0 |
| Total | | 258,227 | 100.00% | 50 |
| Votes cast / turnout | | 328,289 | 61.75% | |
| Registered voters | | 523,529 | | |
Source: Ministry of the Interior

| Candidate | Party | Coalition | First round | |
| Candidate | Party | Coalition | Votes | % |
|---|---|---|---|---|
| Marta Vincenzi | DS | The Olive Tree | 158,238 | 51.21 |
| Enrico Musso | Ind | House of Freedoms | 142,081 | 45.98 |
| Others | | | 8,709 | 2.81 |
| Eligible voters | | | 523,529 | 100.00 |
| Voted | | | 323,289 | 61.75 |
| Blank or invalid ballots | | | 14,261 | |
| Total valid votes | | | 309,028 | |

=== Mayoral and City Council election, 2012 ===
The election took place on two rounds: the first on 6–7 May, the second on 20–21 May 2012.

Results

Summary of the 2012 Genoa City Council election results
| Parties and coalitions | | Votes | % | Seats |
|---|---|---|---|---|
| Democratic Party (Partito Democratico) | PD | 55,137 | 23.89% | 12 |
| Doria List (Lista Doria) | LD | 26,784 | 11.60% | 6 |
| Italy of Values (Italia dei Valori) | IdV | 13,730 | 5.95% | 3 |
| Left Ecology Freedom (Sinistra Ecologia Libertà) | SEL | 11,606 | 5.03% | 2 |
| Federation of the Left (Federazione della Sinistra) | FdS | 5,274 | 2.28% | 1 |
| Others | | 4,723 | 2.04% | 0 |
| Doria coalition (Centre-left) | | 117,254 | 50.80% | 24 |
| Five Star Movement (Movimento Cinque Stelle) | M5S | 32,516 | 14.09% | 5 |
| The People of Freedom (Il Popolo della Libertà) | PdL | 21,251 | 9.21% | 5 |
| Others | | 8,655 | 3.75% | 0 |
| Vinai coalition (Centre-right) | | 29,906 | 12.96% | 5 |
| Musso List (Lista Musso) | LM | 28,818 | 12.49% | 5 |
| Lega Nord | LN | 10,042 | 4.35% | 1 |
| Others | | 12,274 | 5.31% | 0 |
| Total | | 230,810 | 100.00% | 40 |
| Votes cast / turnout | | 279,683 | 55.52% | |
| Registered voters | | 503,752 | | |
Source: Ministry of the Interior

| Candidate | Party | Coalition | First round | | Second round | |
| Candidate | Party | Coalition | Votes | % | Votes | % |
|---|---|---|---|---|---|---|
| Marco Doria | SEL | PD-IdV-SEL-FdS | 127,477 | 48.31 | 114,245 | 59.71 |
| Enrico Musso | Ind | | 39,589 | 15.00 | 77,084 | 40.29 |
| Paolo Putti | M5S | | 36,579 | 13.86 | | |
| Pierluigi Vinai | PdL | | 33,468 | 12.68 | | |
| Edoardo Rixi | LN | | 12,409 | 4.70 | | |
| Others | | | 14,327 | 5.45 | | |
| Eligible voters | | | 503,752 | 100.00 | 503,752 | 100.00 |
| Voted | | | 279,683 | 55.52 | 196,894 | 39.09 |
| Blank or invalid ballots | | | 15,834 | | 5,565 | |
| Total valid votes | | | 263,849 | | 191,329 | |

=== Mayoral and City Council election, 2017 ===
The election took place on two rounds: the first on 11 June, the second on 25 June 2017.

Results

Summary of the 2017 Genoa City Council election results
| Parties and coalitions | | Votes | % | Seats |
|---|---|---|---|---|
| Lega Nord | LN | 28,194 | 12.96% | 9 |
| Genoa Wins (Vince Genova) | VG | 21,243 | 9.76% | 6 |
| Forza Italia | FI | 17,582 | 8.08% | 5 |
| Brothers of Italy (Fratelli d'Italia) | FdI | 11,490 | 5.28% | 3 |
| Direction Italy (Direzione Italia) | DI | 4,638 | 2.13% | 1 |
| Bucci coalition (Centre-right) | | 83,147 | 38.22% | 24 |
| Democratic Party (Partito Democratico) | PD | 43,156 | 19.84% | 7 |
| Crivello List (Lista Crivello) | LC | 20,601 | 9.47% | 3 |
| To Left (A Sinistra) | SI | 6,598 | 3.03% | 0 |
| Others | | 6,933 | 3.19% | 0 |
| Crivello coalition (Centre-left) | | 77,288 | 35.52% | 10 |
| Five Star Movement (Movimento Cinque Stelle) | M5S | 39,971 | 18.37% | 5 |
| Call Me Genoa (Chiamami Genova) | CG | 10,633 | 4.89% | 1 |
| Others | | 6,523 | 2.99% | 0 |
| Total | | 217,562 | 100.00% | 40 |
| Votes cast / turnout | | 237,679 | 48.39% | |
| Registered voters | | 491,167 | | |
Source: Ministry of the Interior

| Candidate | Party | Coalition | First round | | Second round | |
| Candidate | Party | Coalition | Votes | % | Votes | % |
|---|---|---|---|---|---|---|
| Marco Bucci | Ind | LN-FI-FdI-DI | 88,781 | 38.80 | 112,398 | 55.24 |
| Giovanni Crivello | PD | PD-SI | 76,407 | 33.40 | 91,057 | 44.76 |
| Luca Pirondini | M5S | | 41,347 | 18.07 | | |
| Paolo Putti | Ind | | 11,153 | 4.87 | | |
| Others | | | 11,108 | 4.86 | | |
| Eligible voters | | | 491,167 | 100.00 | 491,167 | 100.00 |
| Voted | | | 237,679 | 48.39 | 209,595 | 42.67 |
| Blank or invalid ballots | | | 8,883 | | 6,140 | |
| Total valid votes | | | 228,796 | | 203,455 | |

=== Mayoral and City Council election, 2022 ===
The election took place on 12 June 2022.

Results

Summary of the 2022 Genoa City Council election results
| Parties and coalitions | | Votes | % | Seats |
|---|---|---|---|---|
| Bucci List (Lista Bucci) | LB | 36,335 | 19.06% | 9 |
| Brothers of Italy (Fratelli d'Italia) | FdI | 17,788 | 9.33% | 4 |
| Let's Change! (Cambiamo!) | C! | 17,485 | 9.17% | 4 |
| Lega | L | 12,886 | 6.76% | 3 |
| Genoa Tomorrow (Genova Domani) | GD | 8,952 | 4.70% | 2 |
| Forza Italia | FI | 7,340 | 3.85% | 1 |
| Union of the Centre (Unione di Centro) | UDC | 3,752 | 1.97% | 1 |
| Others | | 656 | 0.35% | 0 |
| Bucci coalition (Centre-right) | | 105,194 | 55.19% | 24 |
| Democratic Party (Partito Democratico) | PD | 39,937 | 20.95% | 10 |
| Dello Strologo List (Lista Dello Strologo) | LDS | 12,032 | 6.31% | 2 |
| Green Europe (Europe Verde) | EV | 9,873 | 5.18% | 2 |
| Five Star Movement (Movimento Cinque Stelle) | M5S | 8,381 | 4.40% | 1 |
| Italian Left (Sinistra Italiana) | SI | 2,930 | 1.54% | 0 |
| Dello Strologo coalition (Centre-left) | | 73,153 | 38.38% | 15 |
| United for the Constitution (Uniti per la Costituzione) | UpC | 6,771 | 3.55% | 1 |
| Others | | 5,480 | 2.87% | 0 |
| Total | | 190,600 | 100% | 40 |
| Votes cast / turnout | | 212,199 | 44.17% | |
| Registered voters | | 480,424 | | |
Source: Ministry of the Interior

| Candidate | Party | Coalition | First round | |
| Candidate | Party | Coalition | Votes | % |
|---|---|---|---|---|
| Marco Bucci | Ind | FI-L-FdI-C!-UDC-IV | 112,457 | 55.49 |
| Ariel Dello Strologo | Ind | PD-EV-SI-M5S | 77,065 | 38.03 |
| Mattia Crucioli | Ind | | 7,221 | 3.56 |
| Others | | | 5,902 | 2.91 |
| Eligible voters | | | 480,424 | 100.00 |
| Voted | | | 212,199 | 44.17 |
| Blank or invalid ballots | | | 9,553 | |
| Total valid votes | | | 202,646 | |

=== Mayoral and City Council election, 2025 ===
The election took place on 25–26 May 2025.

Results

Summary of the 2025 Genoa City Council election results
| Parties and coalitions | | Votes | % | Seats |
|---|---|---|---|---|
| Democratic Party (Partito Democratico) | PD | 65,960 | 29.06% | 14 |
| Salis List (Lista Salis) | LS | 18,853 | 8.31% | 4 |
| Greens and Left Alliance (Alleanza Verdi e Sinistra) | AVS | 15,705 | 6.92% | 3 |
| Five Star Movement (Movimento Cinque Stelle) | M5S | 11,583 | 5.10% | 2 |
| Reform Genoa (Riformiamo Genova) | RG | 5,405 | 2.38% | 1 |
| Salis coalition (Centre-left) | | 117,506 | 51.77% | 24 |
| Brothers of Italy (Fratelli d'Italia) | FdI | 28,234 | 12.44% | 6 |
| Piciocchi List – Genoa Wins (Lista Piciocchi – Vince Genova) | LP | 24,237 | 10.68% | 4 |
| Us Moderates (Noi Moderati) | NM | 17,806 | 7.84% | 3 |
| Lega | L | 15,757 | 6.94% | 2 |
| Forza Italia | FI | 8,589 | 3.78% | 1 |
| Others | | 4,941 | 2.17% | 0 |
| Piciocchi coalition (Centre-right) | | 99,564 | 43.86% | 16 |
| Others | | 9,927 | 4.37% | 0 |
| Total | | 226,997 | 100% | 40 |
| Votes cast / turnout | | 249,115 | 51.90% | |
| Registered voters | | 479,974 | | |
Source: Ministry of the Interior

| Candidate | Party | Coalition | First round | |
| Candidate | Party | Coalition | Votes | % |
|---|---|---|---|---|
| Silvia Salis | Ind | PD-AVS-M5S-IV-A-Volt | 124,720 | 51.48 |
| Pietro Piciocchi | FdI | FdI-FI-L-NM-UDC | 107,091 | 44.20 |
| Others | | | 10,449 | 4.32 |
| Eligible voters | | | 479,974 | 100.00 |
| Voted | | | 249,115 | 51.90 |
| Blank or invalid ballots | | | 6,855 | |
| Total valid votes | | | 242,260 | |

== See also ==
- Timeline of Genoa
