= Marco Doria =

Italian academic and politician

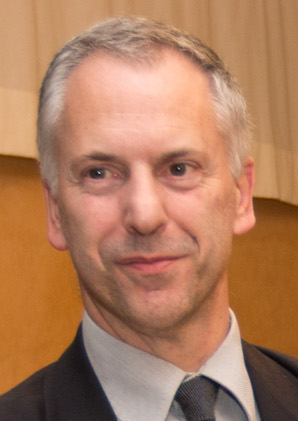

Mayor of Genoa
- In office 21 May 2012 – 27 June 2017
- Preceded by: Marta Vincenzi
- Succeeded by: Marco Bucci

Personal details
- Born: 13 October 1957 (age 68) Genoa, Italy
- Party: PCI (1973–1991); PRC (1991–2009); SEL (2009–2017); SI (since 2017)
- Children: 3 children
- Education: University of Genoa; European University Institute
- Profession: Professor

Marco Doria (born 13 October 1957) is an Italian academic and politician from Genoa. He served as Mayor of Genoa from 2012 to 2017.

== Biography ==
Doria is a descendant of the Genoese ancient and noble family Doria. He studied at the University of Genoa and the European University Institute. He became a professor of economic history at the University of Genoa.

Doria was elected mayor of Genoa on 21 May 2012 and held office till 2017.

== Bibliography ==
- Doria, Marco (1989). Ansaldo. L'impresa e lo Stato (in Italian). Milan: FrancoAngeli. ISBN 88-204-3613-2.
- Doria, Marco (1998). L'imprenditoria industriale in Italia dall'Unità al "miracolo economico" (in Italian). Turin: Giappichelli. ISBN 88-348-8186-9.
- Doria, Marco (2001). Il Banco di Chiavari e della Riviera Ligure. Storia di una banca nel suo territorio 1870-1954 (in Italian). Genoa: Sagep. ISBN 88-7058-816-5.
- Doria, Marco; Assereto, Giovanni, eds. (2007). Storia della Liguria (in Italian). Rome-Bari: Laterza. ISBN 978-88-420-8485-3.
- Doria, Marco; Petri, Rolf, eds. (2007). Banche multinazionali e capitale umano. Studi in onore di Peter Hertner (in Italian). Milan: FrancoAngeli. ISBN 978-88-464-8972-2.
- Doria, Marco (2008). L'acqua e la città. Storia degli acquedotti genovesi de Ferrari, Galliera e Nicolay (secoli XIX-XX) (in Italian). Milan: FrancoAngeli. ISBN 978-88-568-0511-6.
