= Fausto Cuocolo =

Italian jurist and politician (1930–2006)

President of the Regional Council of Liguria
- In office September 1981 – November 1985
- Preceded by: Armando Magliotto
- Succeeded by: Giorgio Luciano Verda

Acting president of the Province of Genoa
- In office 12 May 1972 – 11 August 1972

Personal details
- Born: 24 February 1930 Tortona, Province of Alessandria, Kingdom of Italy
- Died: 19 September 2006 (aged 76) Genoa, Liguria, Italy
- Party: Christian Democracy
- Education: University of Genoa
- Profession: Jurist, lawyer

Fausto Cuocolo (24 February 1930 – 19 September 2006) was an Italian jurist and politician. Cuocolo was amongst the most important Italian constitutionalist and one of the "fathers" of the Italian regionalism.

== Life and academics ==
When he was a student at Liceo Classico Giuseppe Mazzini in Genoa, he was actively involved in the fight against the Nazi-Fascismus. Later, he got a degree in law in Genova at age of 22 and in Political Science also two years later also with the highest mark and Laude for both. He became a member of the Democrazia Cristiana Italian party and of European JEF in Paris.

In 1960 Cuocolo became Professor of Constitutional Law and in 1967 he published "La legge cornice nel rapporto tra Stato e Regione" (with the help of Giuliano Amato and Enzo Cheli), one of the most important books for the Italian regionalism. The most important amongst his books however is Istituzioni di diritto pubblico (Handbook of Public Law), a very common book in the Italian Law Schools. In 1970 Cuocolo was appointed director of political science faculty in Genova.

== Italian Regionalismus ==
Since the 50s Cuocolo made intense efforts in targeting the Italian Constitution in the direction of Regionalismus (giving more power to the Italian regions) through many essayes, papers and monographies. Prof. Cuocolo was also involved in the Statuto of the Regione Liguria, since before the birth of the region itself as a new public body.

== Political life ==
Furthermore, Cuocolo was involved in several prominent positions in the Italian public administration, in both Liguria and at the national level: e.g., he worked as a Law consultant for Italian Prime Ministers as Francesco Cossiga and others, and for the Council of Europe.

== The Brigate Rosse attack ==
The May 31, 1979, Prof. Cuocolo was attacked by the Brigate Rosse in his university during an exam: this was the first attack of the Brigate Rosse in a university. In 1981 a second attempt of attack was foiled on time by the Italian police.

== Banks ==
Cuocolo was also appointed Chief of Fondazione Carige and then of Banca Carige. However, he left the position in 2003 after having criticized some activities of the bank.

== Books ==
Cuocolo wrote 160 papers and 19 monographs.

== Monographs ==
Among them are:

- Il rinvio presidenziale nella formazione delle leggi, Milano, Giuffrè, 1955;
- Il Governo nel vigente ordinamento italiano, Milano, Giuffrè, 1959;
- Gli atti dello Stato aventi forza di legge, Milano, Giuffrè, 1961;
- Le leggi cornice nei rapporti tra Stato e Regioni, Milano, Giuffrè, 1967;
- Saggio sull'iniziativa legislativa, Milano, Giuffrè, 1971;
- Bicamerale: atto primo. Il progetto di revisione costituzionale, Milano, Giuffrè, 1997;
- Principi di diritto costituzionale, Milano, Giuffrè, 1999, 2ª edizione;
- Istituzioni di diritto pubblico, Milano, Giuffrè, 2003, 12ª edizione, ISBN 88-14-10691-6;
- Lezioni di diritto pubblico, Milano, Giuffrè, 2006, 4ª edizione.

== Papers ==
- I nuovi Statuti regionali fra Governo e Corte costituzionale, Giurisprudenza costituzionale, n. 6, 2004;

== About Cuocolo ==
About Prof. Fausto Cuocolo heritage in Law was published also the book:

- A.A.V.V., Studi in onore del Cuocolo Fausto (studies in honour of Fausto Cuocolo), Milano, Giuffrè, 2005. ISBN 978-88-14-11548-6.

== Recognitions ==
- Cavaliere di gran croce dell'Ordine al merito della Repubblica italiana – nastrino per uniforme ordinaria
- Grande ufficiale dell'Ordine al merito della Repubblica italiana – nastrino per uniforme ordinaria
