= Ilaria Caprioglio =

Italian politician

Mayor of Savona
- In office 22 June 2016 – 19 October 2021
- Preceded by: Federico Berruti
- Succeeded by: Marco Russo

Personal details
- Born: 4 February 1969 (age 57) Varazze, Liguria, Italy
- Party: Centre-right independent
- Education: University of Milan
- Profession: lawyer

Ilaria Caprioglio (born 4 February 1969) is an Italian politician who served as mayor of Savona from 2016 to 2021.

Caprioglio ran as an independent for the office of mayor of Savona at the 2016 Italian local elections, supported by a centre-right coalition. She won and took office on 22 June 2016.

== See also ==
- 2016 Italian local elections
- List of mayors of Savona

Political offices
Preceded by Federico Berruti	Mayor of Savona; 2016-2021	Succeeded by Marco Russo
