= Angelo Carossino =

Italian politician (1929–2020)

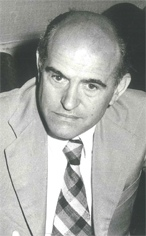
Angelo Carossino

Angelo Carossino (21 February 1929 – 25 July 2020) was an Italian politician who served as Mayor of Savona (1958–1967), President of Liguria (1975–1979) and member of the European Parliament (1979–1989). He was born in Genoa and was a member of the ICP.
