= Giuseppe Pericu =

Italian politician (1937–2022)

Giuseppe Romeo Pericu
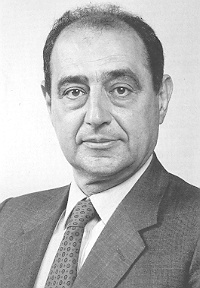
- Giuseppe Pericu in 1994

Italian Chamber of Deputies
- In office 15 April 1994 – 8 May 1996

Mayor of Genoa
- In office 1 December 1997 – 30 May 2007
- Preceded by: Adriano Sansa
- Succeeded by: Marta Vincenzi

Personal details
- Born: 20 October 1937 Genoa, Italy
- Died: 13 June 2022 (aged 84) Genoa, Italy
- Party: PSI (till 1994); FL (1994-1998); DS (1998-2008); PD (2007-2022)
- Education: University of Genoa
- Profession: Politician, academic

Giuseppe Pericu (20 October 1937 – 13 June 2022) was an Italian politician.

A long-time member of the Italian Socialist Party, he joined the Democratic Party of the Left in 1996.

He was the mayor of Genoa from 1997 to 2007.
