= Marco Rizzo =

Italian politician

General Secretary of the Communist Party
- In office 3 July 2009 – 21 January 2023
- Preceded by: Office established
- Succeeded by: Alberto Lombardo

Member of the European Parliament
- In office 20 July 2004 – 13 July 2009
- Constituency: North-West Italy

Member of the Chamber of Deputies
- In office 15 April 1994 – 19 July 2004
- Constituency: Turin (1994–1996); Florence-Pontassieve (1996–2004)

Personal details
- Born: 12 October 1959 (age 67) Turin, Piedmont, Italy
- Party: PCI (1981–1991); PRC (1991–1998); PdCI (1998–2009); PC (2009–2023); DSP (2024–2026); ID (2026–present)
- Profession: Politician

Marco Rizzo (born 12 October 1959) is an Italian politician. A longtime communist activist, he was a member of the Chamber of Deputies from 1994 to 2004 and a Member of the European Parliament for North-West Italy from 2004 to 2009. He was initially active in the Italian Communist Party and later joined the Communist Refoundation Party and the Party of Italian Communists. After his expulsion from the latter in 2009, he founded Communists – Popular Left, which was subsequently renamed the Communist Party, and served as its general secretary from 2009 to 2023.

Rizzo has described his politics as a form of Marxist "popular sovereignism". He later became involved in Sovereign Popular Democracy (DSP), but left the party in 2026 amid disagreements arising from his contacts with Roberto Vannacci and his openness to a possible alliance with him. He subsequently founded Italia Domani, presenting it as a project intended to unite workers, the middle class, small businesses, artisans, farmers, and professionals against the economic and financial elite.

== Biography ==
A graduate in political science in 1985, he was a lecturer in vocational guidance (1985–1994).

From 1986 to 1991, he was a member of the Turin Province party executive of the Italian Communist Party (PCI), and joined the Communist Refoundation Party (PRC) in 1991, serving as its representative to the Council of the Turin Province until 1995. Between 1994 and 2004, he served in the Chamber of Deputies of Italy. From 1995 to 1998, he was coordinator of the National Secretariat of the PRC, then left to become a founding member and Italian Parliament group leader of the Party of Italian Communists (until 2004).

In July 2009, after his expulsion from the Party of Italian Communists (having supported the IdV's candidate Gianni Vattimo in the 2009 European election), he founded a new party called Communists – Popular Left (then renamed Communist Party). Marco Rizzo was a Member of the European Parliament for the North-West with the Party of Italian Communists, a member of the Bureau of the European United Left – Nordic Green Left and vice-chair of the European Parliament's Committee on the Internal Market and Consumer Protection.

== Political positions ==
Rizzo said that he declines his being Marxist in "popular sovereignism", and that would go to Europe (in the European Parliament) "with Sahra Wagenknecht, with Robert Fico [...], also with Orbán".

Rizzo has often criticized the LGBTQIA+ community and inclusivity, complaining about a perceived excessive presence of homosexual and black characters in films and advertising.

Rizzo has repeatedly denied climate change and its anthropogenic origin.

In 2026, Rizzo met and was in contact with Roberto Vannacci many times, having a partial agreement on remigration and not ruling out the possibility of an alliance, something that led to his departure from DSP and the creation of Italia Domani, asserting the need to "unite the people, such as the middle class, small businesses, artisans, farmers, and professionalsm with the working class [...] against the economic and financial elite".

== Works ==
- Rizzo, Marco (2007). Perché ancora comunisti : le ragioni di una scelta (in Italian). Milano: Baldini Castoldi Dalai. ISBN 978-88-6073-329-0.
- Rizzo, Marco (2012). Il golpe europeo : i comunisti contro l'Unione (in Italian). Milano: Baldini & Castoldi. ISBN 978-8867620876.
- Rizzo, Marco (2017). URSS. A 100 anni dalla Rivoluzione Sovietica, i perché della caduta (in Italian). Male Edizioni. ISBN 978-88-85439-46-7.

== See also ==
- 2004 European Parliament election in Italy
