= Sovereign and Popular Italy =

Sovereign and Popular Italy Italia Sovrana e Popolare
- President: Francesco Toscano
- Secretary: Marco Rizzo
- Founded: 25 July 2022
- Dissolved: 21 December 2022
- Succeeded by: Sovereign Popular Democracy
- Ideology: Populism; Sovereigntism; Euroscepticism; Factions: Communism
- Political position: Big tent

Website
- www.italiasovranaepopolare.net

Sovereign and Popular Italy (Italian: Italia Sovrana e Popolare, ISP) was a populist, sovereignist and Eurosceptic political alliance in Italy, formed in July 2022 in order to participate in the 2022 Italian general election. After the election, ISP was disbanded and some of its components gave birth to "Sovereign Popular Democracy". Its leaders were Francesco Toscano and Marco Rizzo.

== History ==
In early 2022, several minor parties and groups including Marco Rizzo's Communist Party (PC), Antonio Ingroia's Civil Action (AC), Stefano D'Andrea's Reconquer Italy (RI), Francesco Toscano's Italy Again (AI) and Adriano Duina's United Italy (IU) agreed on joining their forces in opposition to the policies of Mario Draghi's government of national unity. ISP founding members especially contested Draghi's policies on mandatory COVID-19 vaccination in Italy. Moreover, they harshly condemned the government's response to the 2022 Russian invasion of Ukraine. The coalition was also supportive of Italy's exit from NATO and the European Union.

On 5 July 2022, the parties announced a cooperation for the next general election; on 25 July, following Draghi's resignation as prime minister following the 2022 Italian government crisis, the parties launched on social media their joint list for the upcoming 2022 Italian general election in September, named Sovereign and Popular Italy (ISP). On 1 August, the member parties officially launched ISP during a press conference in the Italian Senate; Rizzo described the alliance as "the only alternative against the liberist, warmonger and sanitary totalitarianism".

On the following day, MEP Francesca Donato (leader of Republican Rebirth) announced that she will not run for the next elections, stating that the anti-establishment front was "fragmented and disorganized". The list was later joined by Socialist Homeland (PS), a left-wing nationalist movement.

In November 2022 Toscano left AI and launched "Sovereign and Popular Italy Again" (AISP). In December D'Andrea announced that ISP was dissolved, by mutual agreement of the other two leading members, Rizzo and Toscano. In January 2023 the PC (whose leader Rizzo had stepped down from secretary and had become the party's honorary president), AC, AISP and the Front for Popular Sovereignty (a breakaway group of RI) launched "Sovereign Popular Democracy".

== Composition ==
Party	Main ideology	Leader
Communist Party (PC)	Communism	Marco Rizzo
Civil Action (AC)	Anti-corruption	Antonio Ingroia
Reconquer Italy (RI)	Euroscepticism	Stefano D'Andrea
Italy Again (AI)	Populism	Francesco Toscano
United Italy (IU)	Populism	Francesco Nappi
Socialist Homeland (PS)	Socialist patriotism	Igor Camilli

== Electoral results ==
Election	Leader	Chamber of Deputies				Senate of the Republic			
Election	Leader	Votes	%	Seats	Position	Votes	%	Seats	Position
2022	Giovanna Colone	404,095	1.24	0 / 400	11th	326,212	1.12	0 / 200	11th
