= Emanuele Dessì =

Italian politician (born 1964)

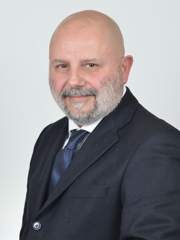
Dessì in 2018.

Emanuele Dessì (born 30 March 1964) is an Italian politician who has served in the Senate of the Republic between 2018 and 2022.

== Political career ==
Originally a member of the Five Star Movement, he left the party on 25 February 2021 due to disagreements over the Draghi government. On 11 November 2021 he joined the Communist Party.
