= Pino Cabras =

Italian politician (born 1968)

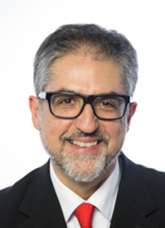
Cabras in 2018

Pino Cabras (born 27 January 1968) is an Italian politician. He is the leader of the Alternativa political party.

== Career ==
Cabras was born in Lanusei, Sardegna. As a member of the Five Star Movement, he was elected to the Chamber of Deputies in the 2018 Italian general election. He was expelled from the party for voting against the Draghi government in February 2021.
