= Communist Party (Italy) =

Communist Party Partito Comunista
- Secretary: Alberto Lombardo
- President: Canzio Visentin
- Founded: 3 July 2009; 17 years ago
- Split from: Party of Italian Communists
- Headquarters: Via degli Elci, 25 Rome
- Newspaper: La Riscossa
- Youth wing: Federation of the Communist Youth
- Overseas wing: Communist Party - Abroad Federation
- Ideology: Marxism-Leninism; Anti-revisionism
- Political position: Far-left
- National affiliation: Sovereign and Popular Italy (2022); Sovereign Popular Democracy (2023)
- International affiliation: IMCWP; World Anti-Imperialist Platform
- Colours: Red
- Chamber of Deputies: 0 / 400
- Senate: 0 / 200
- European Parliament: 0 / 76
- Regional Councils: 0 / 896

Website
- ilpartitocomunista.it

The Communist Party (Partito Comunista, PC) is an anti-revisionist Marxist–Leninist party in Italy, founded in 2009. It defines itself as "the revolutionary political vanguard organization of the working class in Italy". It was a founding member of the Initiative of Communist and Workers' Parties (INITIATIVE) and remained as such from 2013 until the association's dissolution.

== History ==
The party was founded on 3 July 2009 by Marco Rizzo as Communists – Popular Left (Comunisti – Sinistra Popolare). On 21 January 2012 the party changed its name to Communists Popular Left – Communist Party (Comunisti Sinistra Popolare – Partito Comunista). On 17 January 2014 the party finally took the current name.

The PC presented its lists of candidates in some municipalities for the 2016 Italian local elections. At the 2016 Italian constitutional referendum, the PC took the side of "No", considering the constitutional reform as an attempt functionally driven by the interests of investors since it was clearly aimed at easing the anti-popular measures operated by governments.

On 21 January 2017, it was held in Rome the II National Congress in which Rizzo was confirmed as general secretary. On the occasion of the 70th anniversary of the Treaty of Rome on 25 March 2017, the PC organized in Rome a demonstration during the summit of European heads of the states, reaffirming its opposition to the European Union (EU). On 11 November 2017 the party organized a demonstration in Rome on the occasion of the hundredth anniversary of the October Revolution.

On 26 May 2019 it participated in the European elections, where it won 0.88% of the vote. Exactly one month after the Conte II Cabinet took office, the party organized a protest in Rome involving hundreds of people. On 12 March 2020 the Front of Communist Youth, which had been affiliated with the Communist Party since its founding, split and ceased affiliation.

In November 2021 senator Emanuele Dessì, elected with the Five Star Movement, joined the party, giving it representation in the Italian Parliament.

In the run-up of the 2022 general election the party was a founding member of Sovereign and Popular Italy (ISP).

In January 2023 Rizzo was replaced by Alberto Lombardo as the party's general secretary. In July 2024 Rizzo resigned from honorary president too.

== Ideology ==
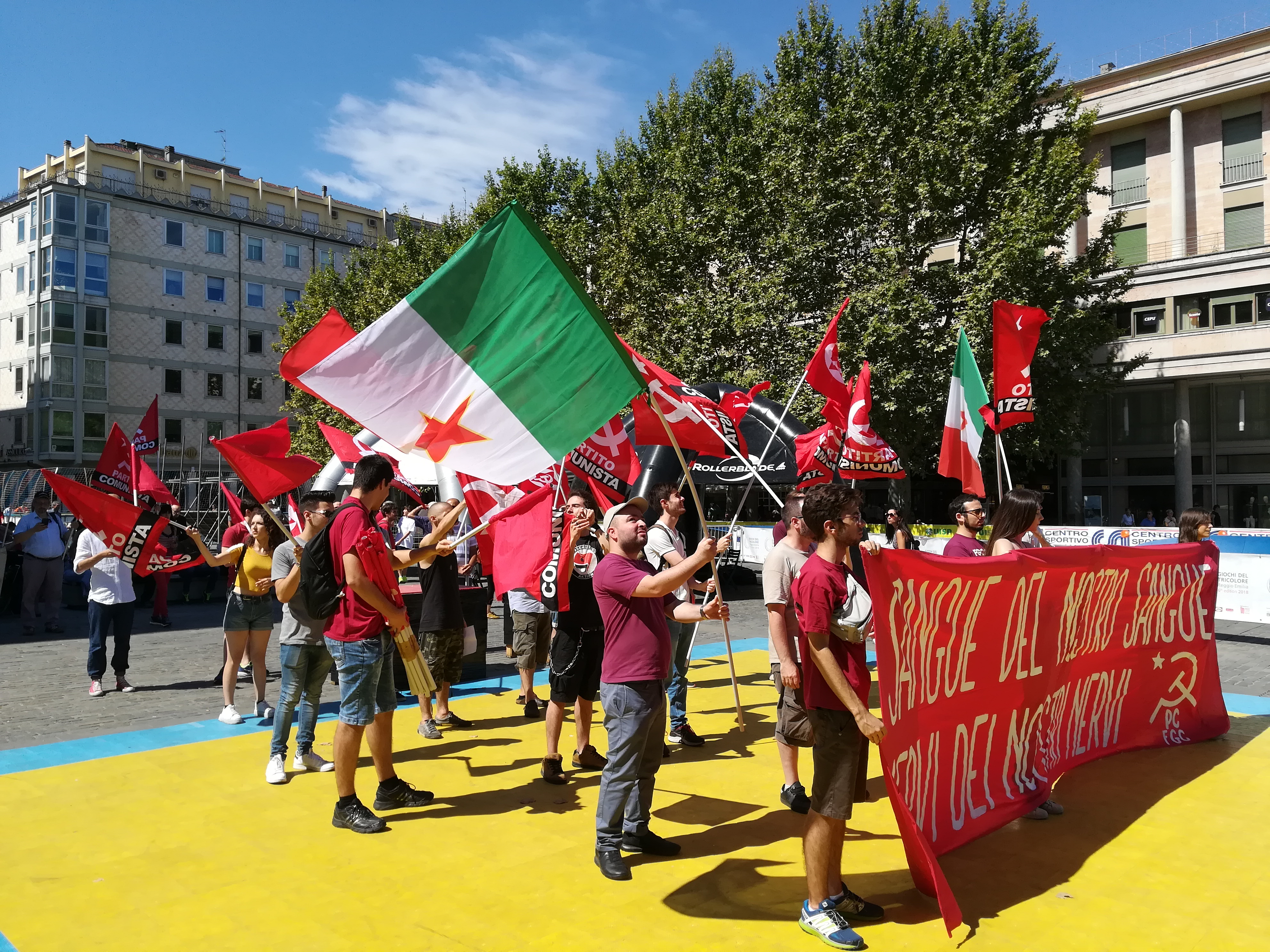
Communist rally in Reggio Emilia

The PC is grounded on Marxism–Leninism. It assumes a political line openly revolutionary, supporting the need for the overthrow of the capitalist system and the transformation of Italy into a socialist country, rejecting both reformist and revisionist theories. The PC stands for the unity of communists in Italy under a solid Marxist–Leninist vision and its watchwords.

The PC refuses the merely electoral political practices that have characterized many communist parties and it considers the participation at the elections just as a mean to spread its ideas and strengthen its entrenchment on local contexts and not at all as the final goal of its political activity.

With regards to the history of the communist movement in Italy, the PC recognizes as leading figures Antonio Gramsci and Pietro Secchia while it takes a highly critical stand on Palmiro Togliatti and Enrico Berlinguer. Unlike other Italian communist organizations, the PC welcomes the historical figure of Joseph Stalin, though rejecting the definition of "stalinism". It considers such a definition politically meaningless since during Stalin's leadership there is no trace of elements of discontinuity or attempts of overcoming the Marxist–Leninist theory. Indeed, the PC reckons the instrumental use of the term Stalinism as a functional anti-communist definition developed following the 20th Congress of the Communist Party of the Soviet Union.

In celebrating the memory of the liberation war, the PC holds that the ideas inspiring the Italian resistance movement have been widely betrayed by the bourgeois Italian Republic established just after the war although many partisans fought for social renewal and a socialist Italy. The PC underlines that the role of those communist fighters in the partisan armed struggle has been progressively diminished and concealed in contemporary historiography.

The PC affirms that the EU is basically unreformable and therefore sustains the needs for an immediate and unilateral exit from the EU and NATO, distancing likewise with "sovereignistic" positions. The PC claims the historical opposition of the Italian Communist Party (PCI) to the EU, the only Italian party openly against the Treaty of Rome of 1957, sustaining that opposition to the EU will be perceived again as a communist watchword and it is misappropriated by the far-right (the Italian Social Movement voted in favor to the Treaty of Rome). Party leader Marco Rizzo has criticized communist leader Enrico Berlinguer due to, among many things, his support to the European Economic Community.

== International relations ==
The Communist Party is member of the Initiative of Communist and Workers' Parties, organization of European Marxist–Leninist parties, of which it is a founding member. It used to be the only Italian political force having solid and reciprocal relationships with the Communist Party of Greece (KKE) and the Communist Party of the Peoples of Spain (PCPE), though after PCPE's split and the formation of the Communist Party of the Workers of Spain (PCTE), there has been no sign of contact between them. Since 2022, the party has also cut ties from the KKE after a series of ideological differences were presented in an exchange of letters from both parties regarding the 2022 Russian invasion of Ukraine and each party's definition of imperialism.

The PC maintains and develops relations with ruling parties in socialist countries, including the Communist Party of Cuba and the Workers' Party of Korea. It also has relations of solidarity with Bolivarian Venezuela, condemning the imperialists' campaign and the subversive efforts against the country, although remaining critical on socialism of the 21st century since the PC affirms the needs for the final destruction of the bourgeois state-machine and its apparatus in order to actually establish socialism.

== Popular support ==
Communist Party results in 2019 European Election by province

Support for the Communist Party is stronger in central Italy in particular in Tuscany and Umbria (part of the "Red Belt"). The party ran in all the constituencies of Italy for the first time in the 2019 European Parliament election. It made its best results in Tuscany (1.68%), in particular in the province of Livorno (2.82%) and in the province of Siena (1.89%), while it was weaker in South Tyrol (0.21%), Trentino (0.49%), and Sicily (0.46%).

== Electoral results ==
=== Italian Parliament ===
Election	Leader	Chamber of Deputies				Senate of the Republic				Government
Election	Leader	Votes	%	Seats	+/–	Votes	%	Seats	+/–	Government
2013	Marco Rizzo	6,977	0.71 (Note: In abroad constituencies only.)	0 / 12	New	7,578	0.85	0 / 6	New	No seats
2018	Marco Rizzo	106,816	0.33	0 / 630	0	101,648	0.33	0 / 315	0	No seats
2022	Marco Rizzo	Into ISP		0 / 400	0	Into ISP		0 / 200	0	No seats

=== European Parliament ===
Election	Leader	Votes	%	Seats	+/–	EP Group
2019	Marco Rizzo	235,467 (9th)	0.88	0 / 76	New	–
2024	Marco Rizzo	Into DSP		0 / 76	0	–

=== Regional Councils ===
Region	Election year	Votes	%	Seats
Marche	2020	8,182 (14th)	1.31% (Note: As the electoral pact Comunista! with the Italian Communist Party)	0 / 31
Tuscany	2020	16,962 (11th)	1.05%	0 / 35
Emilia-Romagna	2020	10,287 (12th)	0.48 (Note: Excluded from Piacenza, Ferrara and Ravenna constituencies. It got 0.62% of the votes where it ran)	0 / 50
Umbria	2019	4,108 (12th)	0.98	0 / 21

== Symbols ==
2009–2012

2012–2013

2013–present

=== Electoral symbols ===
2018 general election

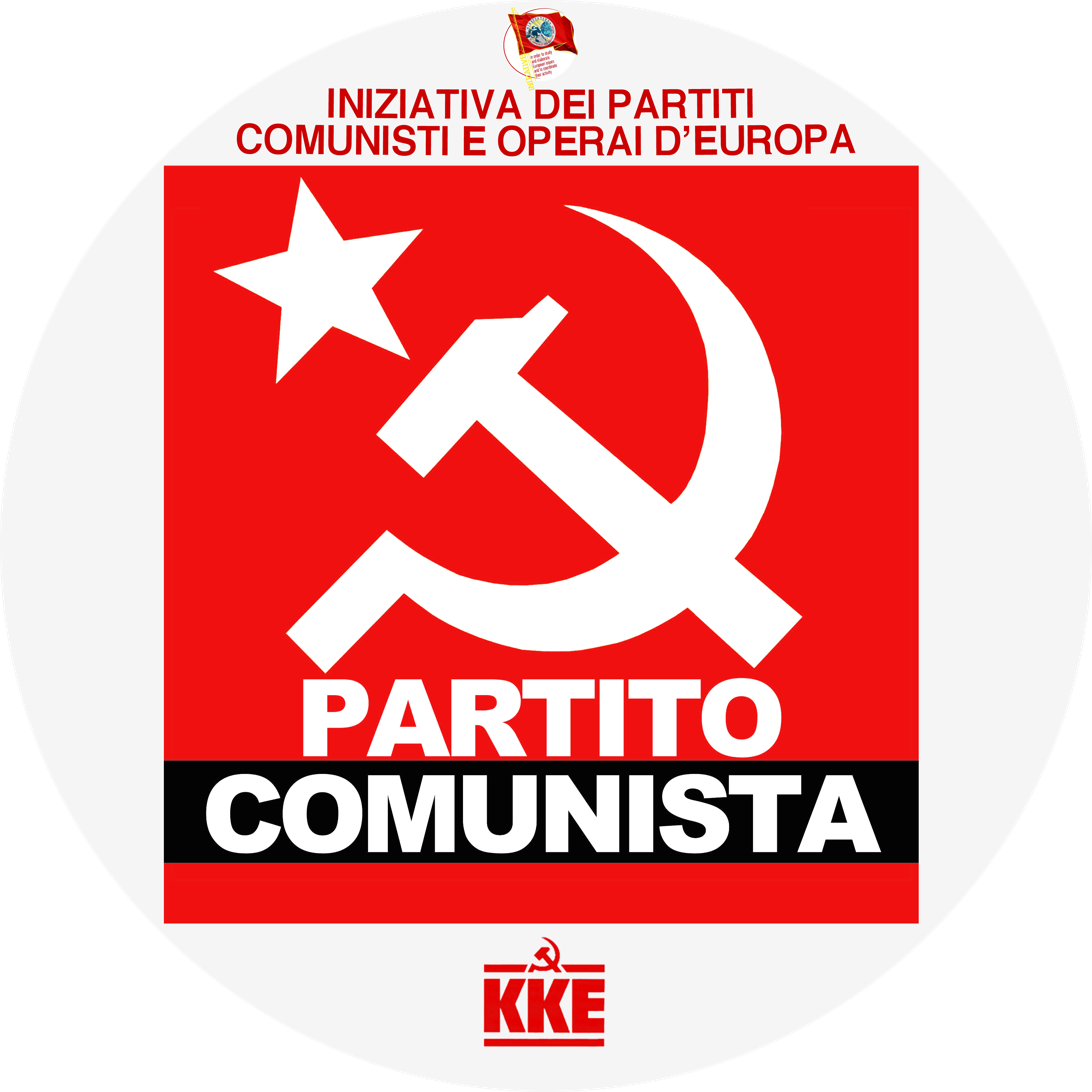
2019 European election

== Leadership ==
- General Secretary: Marco Rizzo (2009–2023), Alberto Lombardo (2023–present)
- President: Canzio Visentin (2020–present)
- Honorary President: Marco Rizzo (2023–2024)
