= Mattia Crucioli =

Italian politician (born 1976)

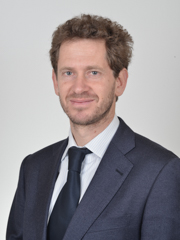
- Crucioli in 2018

Member of the Senate
- In office 23 March 2018 – 12 October 2022
- Constituency: Liguria – U02

Personal details
- Born: 3 May 1976 (age 50)
- Party: New Internationalist Order (since 2023)

Mattia Crucioli (born 3 May 1976) is an Italian politician serving as mayor of Santo Stefano d'Aveto since 2026. From 2018 to 2022, he was a member of the Senate.
