= Province of Genoa =

Former province of Liguria, Italy

Coordinates: 44°24′40.16″N 8°55′57.58″E

- Province (1859–2014)
- Flag Coat of arms

- Map highlighting the location of the province of Genoa in Italy
- Country: Italy
- Region: Liguria
- Capital(s): Genoa
- Comuni: 67

Government
  - President: office abolished

Area
  - Total: 1,838 km^{2} (710 sq mi)

Population (03-31-2012)
  - Total: 880,361
  - Density: 479.0/km^{2} (1,241/sq mi)
- Time zone: UTC+1 (CET)
  - Summer (DST): UTC+2 (CEST)
- Postal code: 16010 - 16049, 16100
- Telephone prefix: 010, 0185
- Vehicle registration: GE
- ISTAT: 010

The province of Genoa (Italian: provincia di Genova) was a province in the Liguria region of Italy. Its capital was the city of Genoa. It was replaced by Metropolitan City of Genoa.

== Overview ==
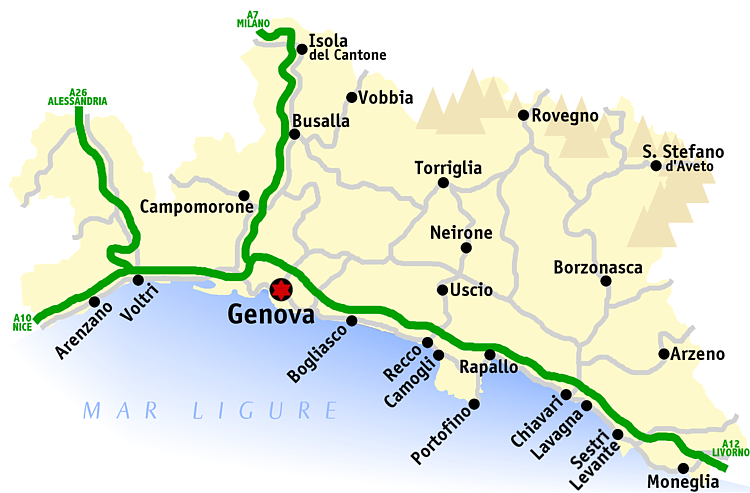
Map of the province of Genoa

It has an area of 1,838 square kilometres (710 mi^{2}) and a total population of about 0.9 million (2009). There are 67 comuni (sing.: comune) in the Metropolitan City of Genoa.

The city of Genoa would be named after a mythical two-headed God, Janus, protector of ships. Or it could derives from a Ligurian tribal word, for "knee" (genu), or the Latin name for gate, "janua". The city is set at the foot of mountains in the Gulf of Genoa at the most northerly end of the Tyrrhenian Sea, where at one time it ruled the maritime world. Genoa has fine examples of Baroque Church and Palace architecture.

== History ==
With the establishment of the Republic of Genoa in the 11th century, the whole territory subjected to it was divided into underlying local podesterias. At the same time, in some areas of the Genoese territory, the creation of lordships, subjected or, in other cases, even semi-independent from Genoa, were administered by the various noble families of the time; among these the Fieschi, the Spinola, the Doria and the Malaspina, among the best known. Administrative and jurisdictional divisions of the territory which on several occasions also led to clashes between cities, sometimes even neighboring ones, in favor or against the domination of "La Superba".

The history of the provincial territory remained almost tied to the historical facts that affected the Genoese republic, until its end in 1797. In 1800, Napoleon became Emperor and King of Italy, and it became part of the French Empire. When Napoleon was defeated in 1814, it became part of the Kingdom of Sardinia. At that time Genoa was the most important port and trading center in Italy.

The province of Genoa was established in 1859 by decree and was established on 1 March 1860. The first chairman was Antonio Caveri, a lawyer. It was subdivided into five districts, Levante, Chiavari, Genoa, Savona, and Albenga, which largely corresponded to previous divisions of the Republic of Genoa, which had broken up after Napoleon's Italian campaign. King Victor Emmanuel II approved the province's coat of arms in 1875 and they were amended in 1933 by the Fascist government by the addition of fasces.

== Comuni ==
Most populated comuni

Below is a list of the 10 comuni (sing.: comune) of the province sorted by number of inhabitants at 31 December 2010:

Pos.	City	Population (ab)
1º	Genoa	607.906
2º	Rapallo	30.785
3º	Chiavari	27.815
4º	Sestri Levante	18.794
5º	Lavagna	13.013
6º	Arenzano	11.724
7º	Recco	10.178
8º	Santa Margherita Ligure	9.915
9º	Cogoleto	9.209
10º	Serra Riccò	7.994

== See also ==
- Metropolitan City of Genoa
- Aveto Natural Regional Park
