= Giorgia Meloni =

Prime Minister of Italy since 2022

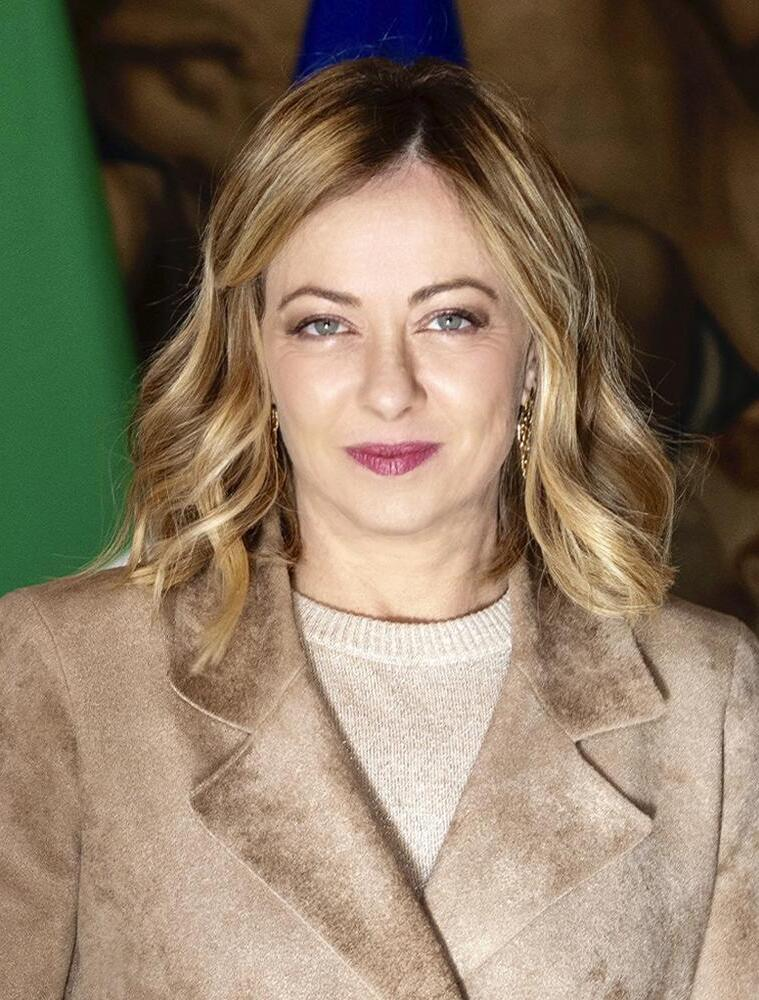
- Official portrait, 2024

Prime Minister of Italy
- Incumbent
- Assumed office 22 October 2022
- President: Sergio Mattarella
- Deputy: Antonio Tajani; Matteo Salvini
- Preceded by: Mario Draghi

President of Brothers of Italy
- Incumbent
- Assumed office 8 March 2014
- Preceded by: Ignazio La Russa

President of the European Conservatives and Reformists Party
- In office 1 April 2020 – 14 January 2025
- Preceded by: Jan Zahradil
- Succeeded by: Mateusz Morawiecki

Minister of Youth
- In office 8 May 2008 – 16 November 2011
- Prime Minister: Silvio Berlusconi
- Preceded by: Giovanna Melandri
- Succeeded by: Andrea Riccardi

Member of the Chamber of Deputies
- Incumbent
- Assumed office 28 April 2006
- Constituency: See list: Lazio 1 (2006–2008); Lazio 2 (2008–2013); Lombardy 3 (2013–2018); Latina (2018–2022); L'Aquila (since 2022)

Personal details
- Born: 15 January 1977 (age 49) Rome, Lazio, Italy
- Party: Brothers of Italy (since 2012)
- Other political affiliations: Italian Social Movement (1992–1995); National Alliance (1995–2009); The People of Freedom (2009–2012)
- Domestic partner(s): Andrea Giambruno (2015–2023)
- Children: 1
- Relatives: Zoe Incrocci (grandmother); Agenore Incrocci (granduncle)
- Website: Government website; Personal website
- Meloni's voice Commemmorating the fall of the Berlin Wall; Recorded 9 November 2022

Giorgia Meloni (Italian: [ˈdʒordʒa meˈloːni]; born 15 January 1977) is an Italian politician who has served as Prime Minister of Italy since October 2022. She is the first and only woman to hold the office and the head of the longest-serving government in the history of the Italian Republic. (Note: Italy's constitutional custom and jurisprudence defines a Government's length as the consecutive period between the formal nomination of the Government and its formal resignation; when a Prime Minister serves non-consecutive terms, or resigns in the midst of a government crisis or cabinet reshuffle only to be immediately re-appointed, those are counted as separate Governments.) A member of the Chamber of Deputies since 2006, she has been president of the right-wing to far-right party Brothers of Italy (FdI) since 2014, and was president of the European Conservatives and Reformists Party from 2020 to 2025.

In 1992, Meloni joined the Youth Front, the youth wing of the Italian Social Movement (MSI), a neo-fascist political party founded in 1946 by followers of Italian fascism. She later became the national leader of Student Action, the student movement of the National Alliance (AN), a post-fascist party that became the MSI's legal successor in 1995 and moved towards national conservatism. She was a councillor of the province of Rome from 1998 to 2002, after which she became the president of Youth Action, the youth wing of AN. In 2008, she was appointed Minister for Youth Policies in the fourth Berlusconi government, a role which she held until 2011.

In 2012, she co-founded FdI, a legal successor to AN, and became its president in 2014. She unsuccessfully ran in the 2014 European Parliament election and the 2016 Rome municipal election. After the 2018 general election, she led FdI in opposition during the entire 18th legislature. FdI grew its popularity in opinion polls, particularly during the management of the COVID-19 pandemic by the Draghi Cabinet, a national unity government to which FdI was the only opposition party. Following the fall of the Draghi government, FdI won the 2022 general election.

Meloni is a conservative and right-wing populist who is also a critic of globalism. She is opposed to euthanasia, same-sex marriage, and same-sex parenting, stating that nuclear families are exclusively headed by male–female pairs. Meloni supported (but never enacted) a naval blockade to halt illegal immigration, and she has been described as xenophobic and Islamophobic by some critics. A supporter of NATO, she maintains Eurosceptic views regarding the European Union (EU), views she describes as "Eurorealist". She favoured improved relations with Russia before the 2022 Russian invasion of Ukraine, which she condemned, pledging to keep sending arms to Ukraine. In 2024, Forbes ranked Meloni as the third-most-powerful woman in the world and she was listed amongst the most influential people in the world by Time magazine, while Politico ranked her as the most powerful person in Europe in 2025.

== Early life ==
Giorgia Meloni was born on 15 January 1977 in Rome, Lazio Region, Italy. Her father, Francesco Meloni, was the son of Nino Meloni, a radio director from Sardinia, and the actress Zoe Incrocci from Lombardy. Meloni's mother, Anna Paratore, is from Sicily. Her father was a tax advisor and, according to some political profiles, had communist sympathies and voted for the Italian Communist Party, while her mother later became a novelist.

Her father abandoned the family in 1978 when she was one year old, moving to the Canary Islands and remarrying. Meloni has four half-siblings from her father's second marriage. Seventeen years later, in 1995, he was convicted of drug trafficking and sentenced to nine years in a Spanish prison. He last contacted Meloni in 2006, when she became the vice-president of the Chamber of Deputies. Legal documents have revealed an alleged indirect economic link through a network of real estate companies in which the ex-wife Anna Paratore, mother of Giorgia Meloni, was a partner at various times.

Meloni was raised in the working-class district of Garbatella in Rome, moving there after the more affluent home she had first lived in as an infant with her parents was destroyed in a house fire a few years after her father left. Her upbringing has been described by her family as impoverished. In her autobiography, Meloni wrote that her childhood and her family's breakdown influenced her political outlook. Meloni has a sister, Arianna, who was born in 1975 and has been appointed head of the party's political secretariat in 2023. Arianna was also partnered with Francesco Lollobrigida, who has been Minister of Agriculture since 22 October 2022.

=== Education and early political activism ===
In 1992, at 15 years of age, Meloni joined the Youth Front, the youth wing of the Italian Social Movement (MSI), a neo-fascist political party that dissolved in 1995. During this time, she founded the student coordination Gli Antenati ('The Ancestors'), which took part in the protest against the public education reform promoted by minister Rosa Russo Iervolino. In 1996, she became the national leader of Student Action, the student movement of the post-fascist National Alliance (AN), the national-conservative heir of the MSI, representing this movement in the Student Associations Forum established by the Italian Ministry of Education.

In 1998, after winning the primary election, Meloni was elected as a councillor of the province of Rome, holding this position until 2002. She was elected national director in 2000 and became the first woman president of Youth Action, the AN youth wing, in 2004. During these years, she worked as a nanny, waitress, and bartender at the Piper Club, one of the most famous nightclubs in Rome.

Meloni graduated from Istituto tecnico professionale di Stato Amerigo Vespucci (ItpSAV) in 1996. After her election to the Italian Parliament in 2006, she declared in her curriculum vitae that she obtained a high school diploma in languages with the final mark of 60/60, and "Diploma di liceo linguistico; Giornalista". This created some controversy, as ItpSAV was not a foreign language high school and was not qualified to issue any diploma in languages; instead, it was a Hospitality Institute (see istituto tecnico) specialised in issuing professional diplomas for job titles such as chef, waiter, entertainer, tour guide, hostess, depending on the course of studies chosen by the student. It is unknown what course of studies Meloni selected at ItpSAV. Meloni mentioned that the Hospitality Institute she attended became the Centro di Formazione Professionale Ernesto Nathan issuing diplomas in foreign languages. However, training centres are not allowed to issue diplomas. The Centro di Formazione Professionale Ernesto Nathan issues qualifications for beauticians and hairdressers.

== Political career ==
=== Minister of Youth ===
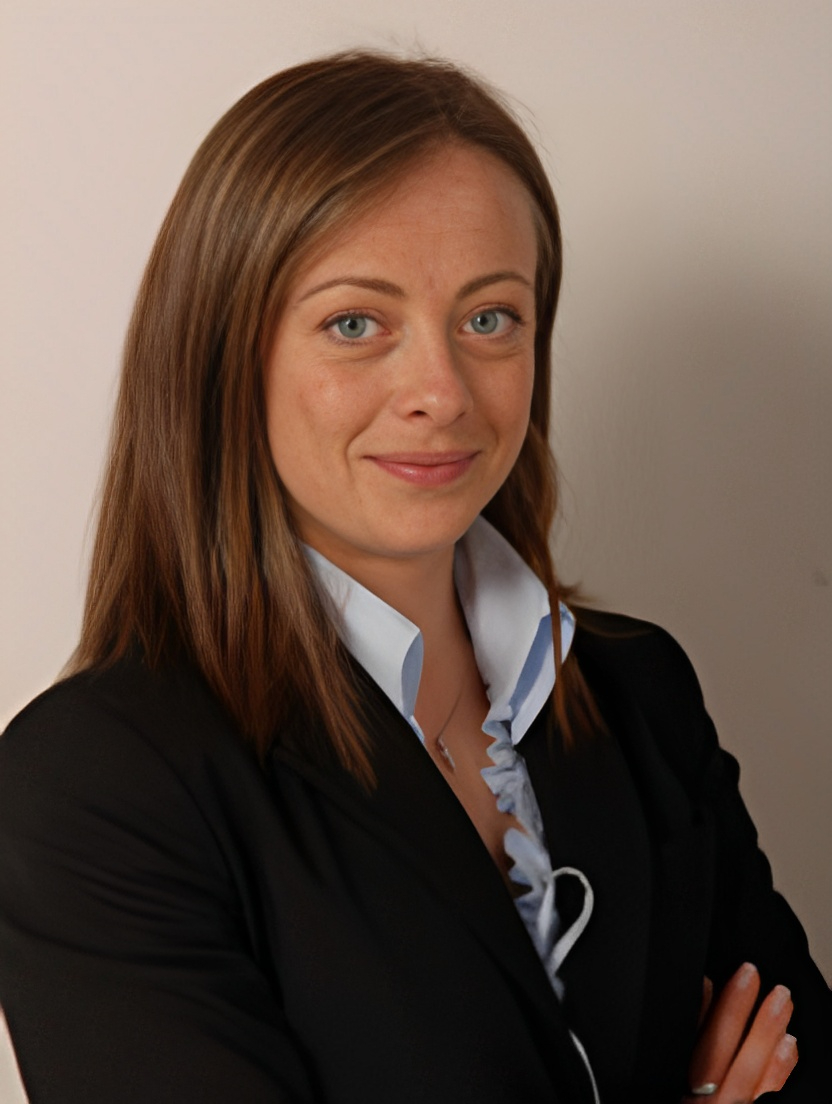
Meloni as Minister for Youth Policies in 2008

In the 2006 Italian general election, she was elected to the Chamber of Deputies as a member of the National Alliance (AN), where she became its youngest ever vice-president. In 2006, she also started to work as a journalist. In 2006, Meloni defended the laws passed by the third Berlusconi government that benefited companies of the prime minister and media mogul Silvio Berlusconi and also delayed ongoing trials involving him. Meloni said: "it is necessary to contextualise them. Those are laws that Silvio Berlusconi made for himself. But they are perfectly fair laws."

After the general election in April 2008, she, then 31 years old, was appointed Minister for Youth Policies in the fourth Berlusconi government, a position she held until 16 November 2011, when Berlusconi was forced to resign as the prime minister amid a financial crisis and public protests. She was the second youngest-ever minister in the history of Italy since 1861. In August 2008, she invited Italian athletes to boycott the opening ceremony of the Beijing Olympic Games in disagreement with the Chinese policy implemented towards Tibet. This statement was criticised by Berlusconi and by foreign affairs minister Franco Frattini.

In 2009, her party merged with Forza Italia (FI) into The People of Freedom (PdL) and she took over the presidency of the united party's youth section, called Young Italy. In the same year, she voted in favour of a decree law against euthanasia.

In November 2010, on behalf of the ministry, she presented a €300 million package (equivalent to €396.77 million in 2023) called the "Right to the Future". It was aimed at investing in young people and contained five initiatives, including incentives for new entrepreneurs, bonuses in favour of temporary workers, and loans for deserving students.

In November 2012, she announced her bid to contest the PdL leadership against Angelino Alfano, in opposition to the party's support of the Monti government. After the cancellation of the primaries, she teamed up with fellow politicians Ignazio La Russa and Guido Crosetto to set out an anti-Monti policy, asking for renewal within the party and being also critical of the leadership of Berlusconi.

=== Leader of Brothers of Italy ===
In December 2012, Meloni, La Russa, and Crosetto founded a new political movement, Brothers of Italy (FdI), whose name comes from the words of the Italian national anthem. In the 2013 Italian general election, she stood as part of Berlusconi's centre-right coalition and received 2.0% of the vote and 9 seats. She was re-elected to the Chamber of Deputies for Lombardy and was later appointed the party's leader in the house, a position that she would hold until 2014, when she resigned to dedicate herself to the party. She was succeeded by Fabio Rampelli.

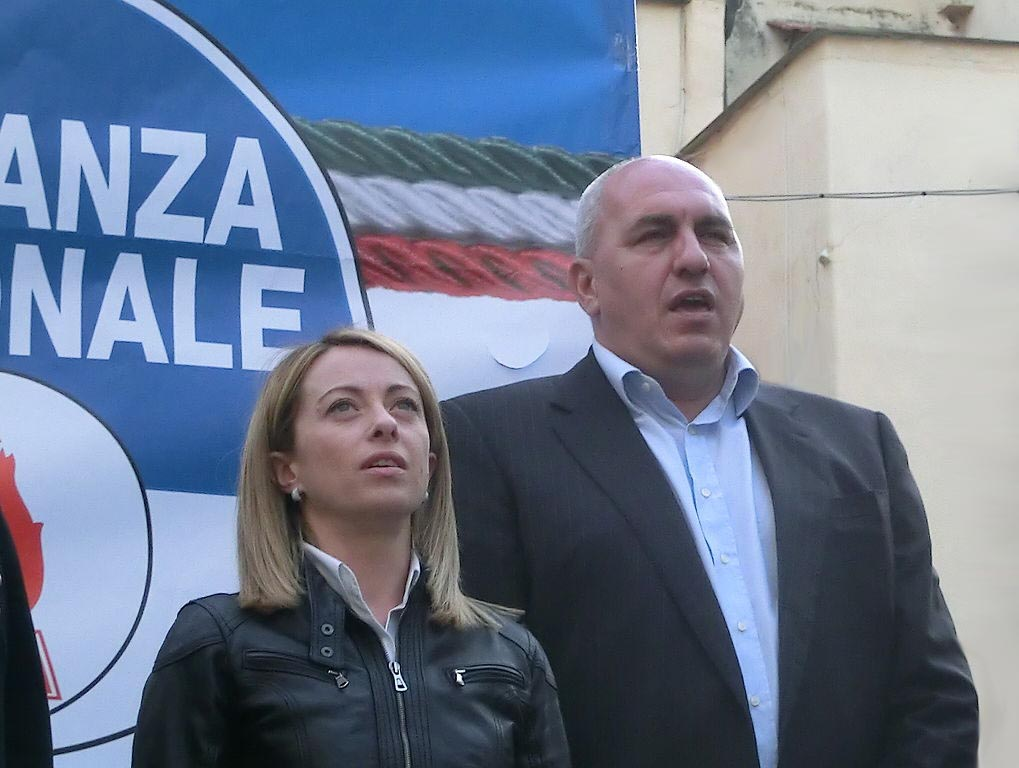
Meloni with Guido Crosetto during an FdI rally in 2014

In March 2014, she became president of FdI, and in April, she was nominated for the 2014 European Parliament election in Italy as the leader of the FdI in all five constituencies. FdI party obtained 3.7% of the votes, not exceeding the threshold of 4%, and she did not become a Member of the European Parliament; she received 348,700 votes. On 4 November 2015, she founded Our Land, a conservative political committee in support of her campaigns. Our Land was a parallel organisation to FdI, and aimed at enlarging FdI's popular base.

On 30 January 2016, she participated in Family Day, an anti-LGBT rights demonstration, declaring herself against LGBT adoption. At the same Family Day, she announced that she was pregnant; her daughter Ginevra was born on 16 September. In the 2016 Rome municipal election in June, she ran for mayor with the support of Us with Salvini, a political party led by Matteo Salvini, and in opposition to the candidate supported by Berlusconi's Forza Italia (FI), Alfio Marchini. In May 2016, she promised to name a street after Giorgio Almirante if elected, causing controversy among the local Jewish community and the anti-fascist association ANPI (Associazione Nazionale Partigiani d'Italia). Meloni won 20.6% of the vote, almost twice that of FI's candidate, but she did not qualify for the run-off, while FdI obtained 12.3% of the vote.

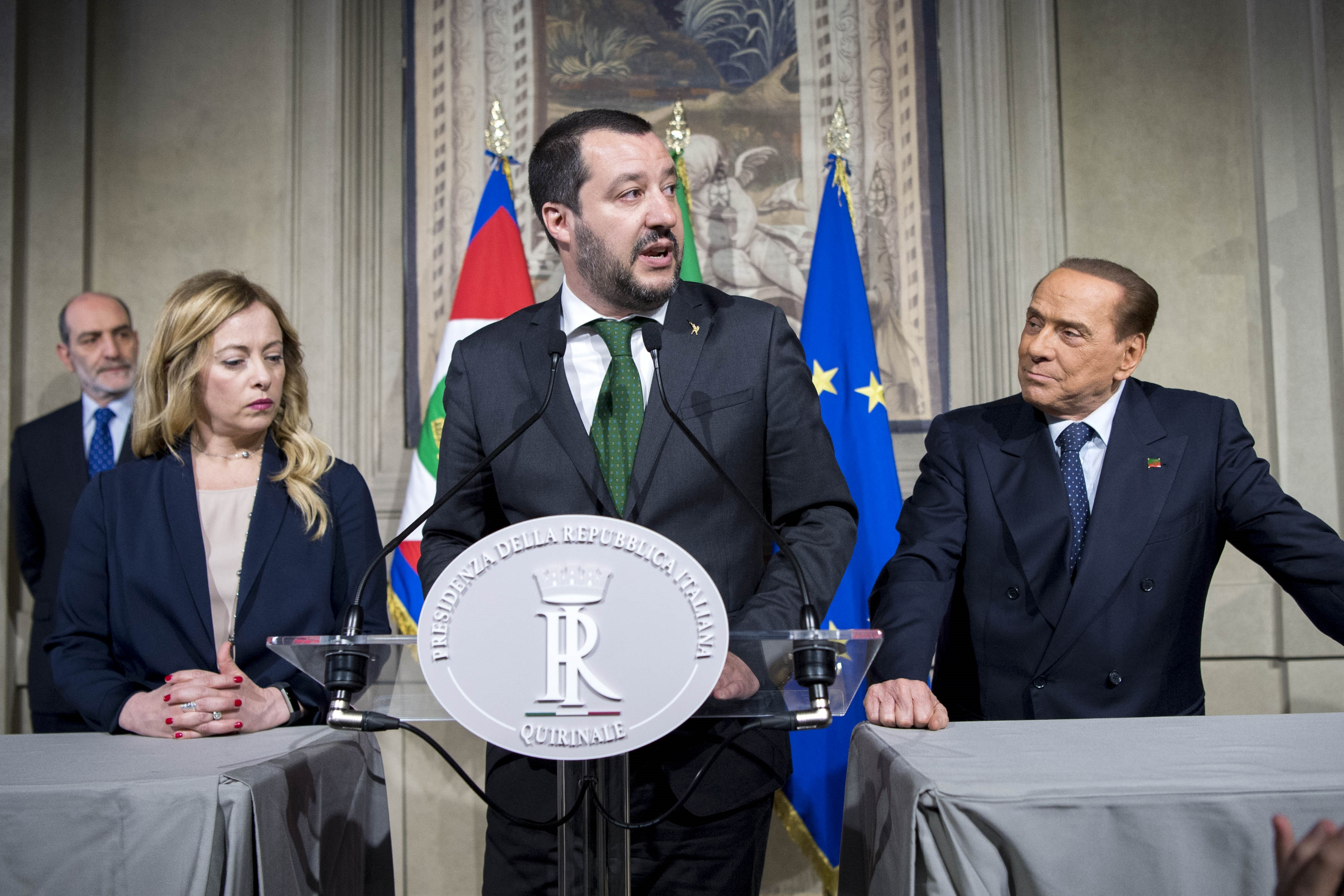
Meloni with Matteo Salvini (centre) and Silvio Berlusconi (right) in 2018

During the campaign for the 2016 Italian constitutional referendum on the reform promoted by the Renzi government, Meloni founded the "No, Thanks" committee and participated in numerous television debates, including one against the then prime minister Matteo Renzi. As "No" won with almost 60% of the votes on 4 December, Meloni called for snap elections. When Renzi resigned the next day, she withheld confidence from the next government led by Paolo Gentiloni on 12 December. The 2–3 December 2017 congress of FdI in Trieste saw the re-election of Meloni as president of the party, as well as a renewal of the party logo and the joining of Daniela Santanchè, a long-time right-wing politician.

As party leader, she decided to form the alliance with the League (Lega), led by Salvini, launching several political campaigns with him against the centre-left government led by the Democratic Party (PD), placing FdI in Eurosceptic and right-wing populist positions. In the 2018 Italian general election, FdI stood as part of the centre-right coalition, with Berlusconi's FI, Salvini's Lega, and Raffaele Fitto's Us with Italy. Meloni's party obtained 4.4% of the vote and more than three times the seats won in 2013. She was elected to the Chamber of Deputies for the single-member constituency of Latina, Lazio, with 41% of the vote. The centre-right coalition, in which the League emerged as the main political force, won a plurality of seats in the Chamber of Deputies; as no political group or party won an outright majority, it resulted in a hung parliament.

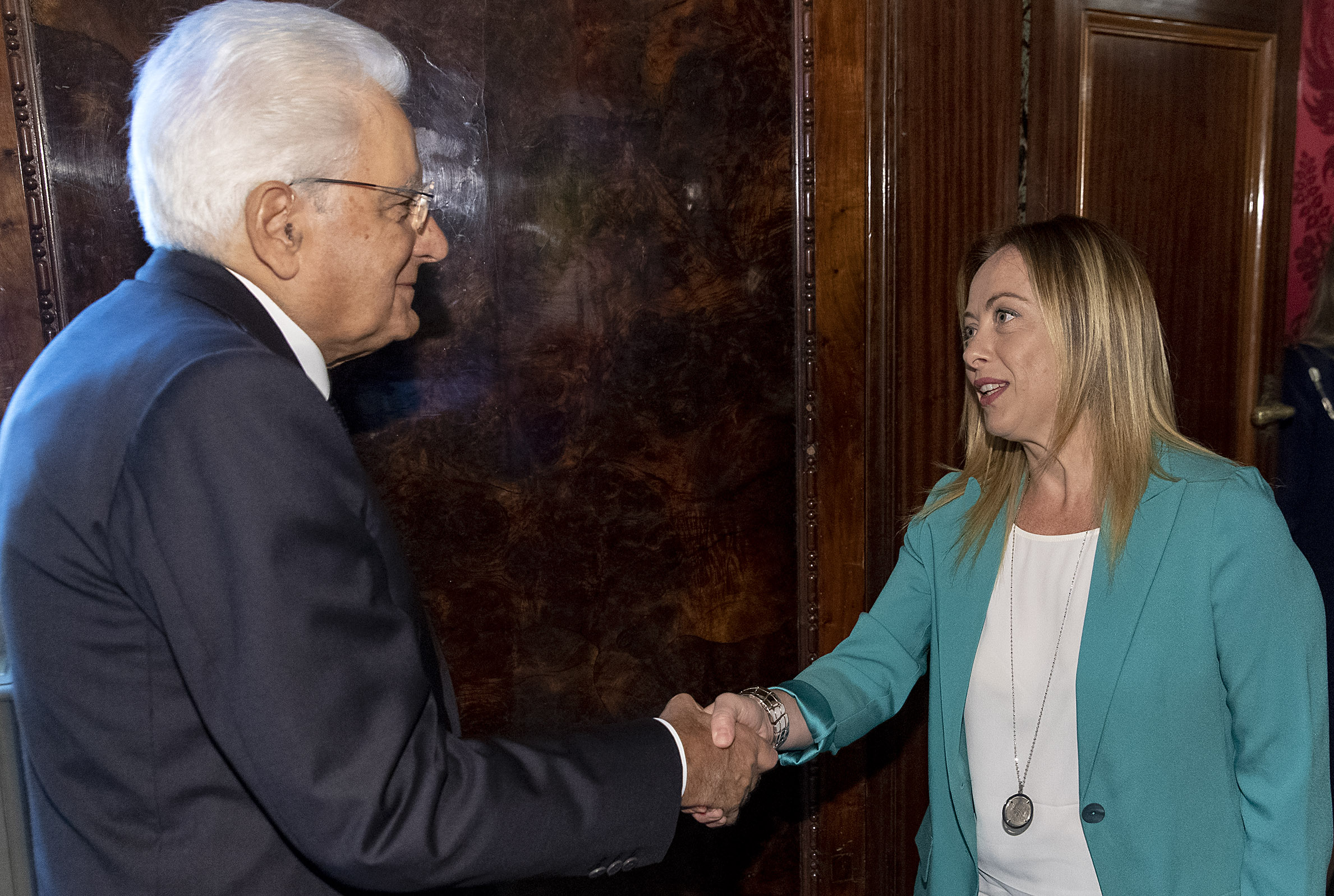
Meloni with President Sergio Mattarella in 2019

On 19 October 2019, she participated in the Italian Pride rally in Rome against the newly formed second Conte government. In her speech, she criticised the proposal to replace on the Italian identity cards of minors the wording father and mother with parent 1 and parent 2, concluding with the slogan "I am Giorgia. I'm a woman, I'm a mother, I'm Italian, I'm Christian". This slogan was remixed by two Milanese DJs, becoming a disco-trash catchphrase with millions of views, imitations, and memes on social media, even winning a gold disc. By her own admission in her autobiography, the media and viral success of the remixed music video, having lost the original satirical intention in favour of the LGBT community with which it had been created, greatly increased her popularity as a politician, who she said was suddenly transformed "from a boring politician into a curious pop phenomenon".

In February 2021, she joined the Aspen Institute, an international think tank headquartered in Washington, D.C., which includes many financiers, businessmen, and politicians, such as Giulio Tremonti. On 19 February 2021, the University of Siena professor Giovanni Gozzini insulted Meloni calling her vulgar names from a radio; both the president Sergio Mattarella and the prime minister Mario Draghi phoned Meloni and stigmatised Gozzini, who was suspended by the board of his university.

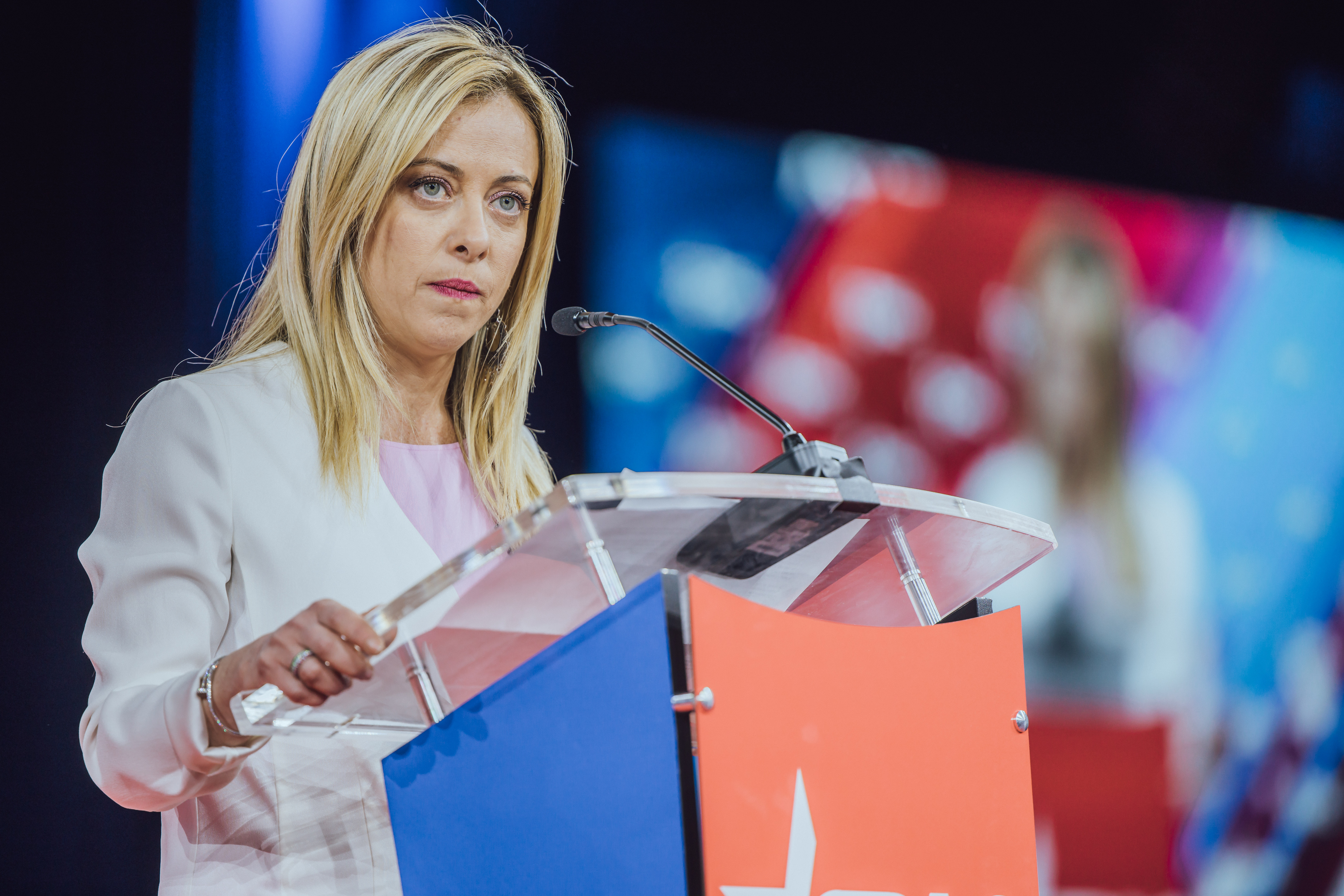
Meloni at CPAC 2022 in Florida

In October 2021, Meloni signed the Madrid Charter, a 2020 document that describes left-wing groups as enemies of Ibero-America involved in a "criminal project" that are "under the umbrella of the Cuban regime". It was drafted by Vox, a Spanish far-right party. She also took part at Vox's party congress, where she said: "Yes to the natural family. No to the LGBT lobby, yes to sexual identity. No to gender ideology. No to Islamist violence, yes to secure borders. No to mass migration, no to big international finance, no to the bureaucrats of Brussels." In February 2022, Meloni spoke at the annual Conservative Political Action Conference in Florida. She told the attending American conservative activists and officials they must defend their views against progressives.

=== 2022 general election ===
Heading into the 2022 Italian general election, a snap election that was called after the 2022 Italian government crisis, it was agreed among the centre-right coalition that the leader of the party receiving the most votes would be put forward as the prime minister candidate. As of July 2022, FdI was the first party in the coalition according to opinion polling, and she was widely expected to become Prime Minister of Italy if the centre-right coalition obtained an absolute majority in Parliament, which would be the most right-wing government in the history of the Italian Republic according to some academics.

In an attempt to placate fears among those who describe FdI as neo-fascist or far right, including fears within the European Commission that she could lead Italy towards Hungary under Viktor Orbán, Meloni told the foreign press that Italian fascism is history. As president of the European Conservatives and Reformists Party since 2020, she said she shared the experiences and values of the Conservative Party in the United Kingdom, Likud in Israel, and the Republican Party in the United States. Critics were sceptical of her claims, citing her speeches on LGBT rights. She campaigned for lower taxes, less European bureaucracy, and a halt to illegal immigration through a naval blockade, saying she would put national interests first.

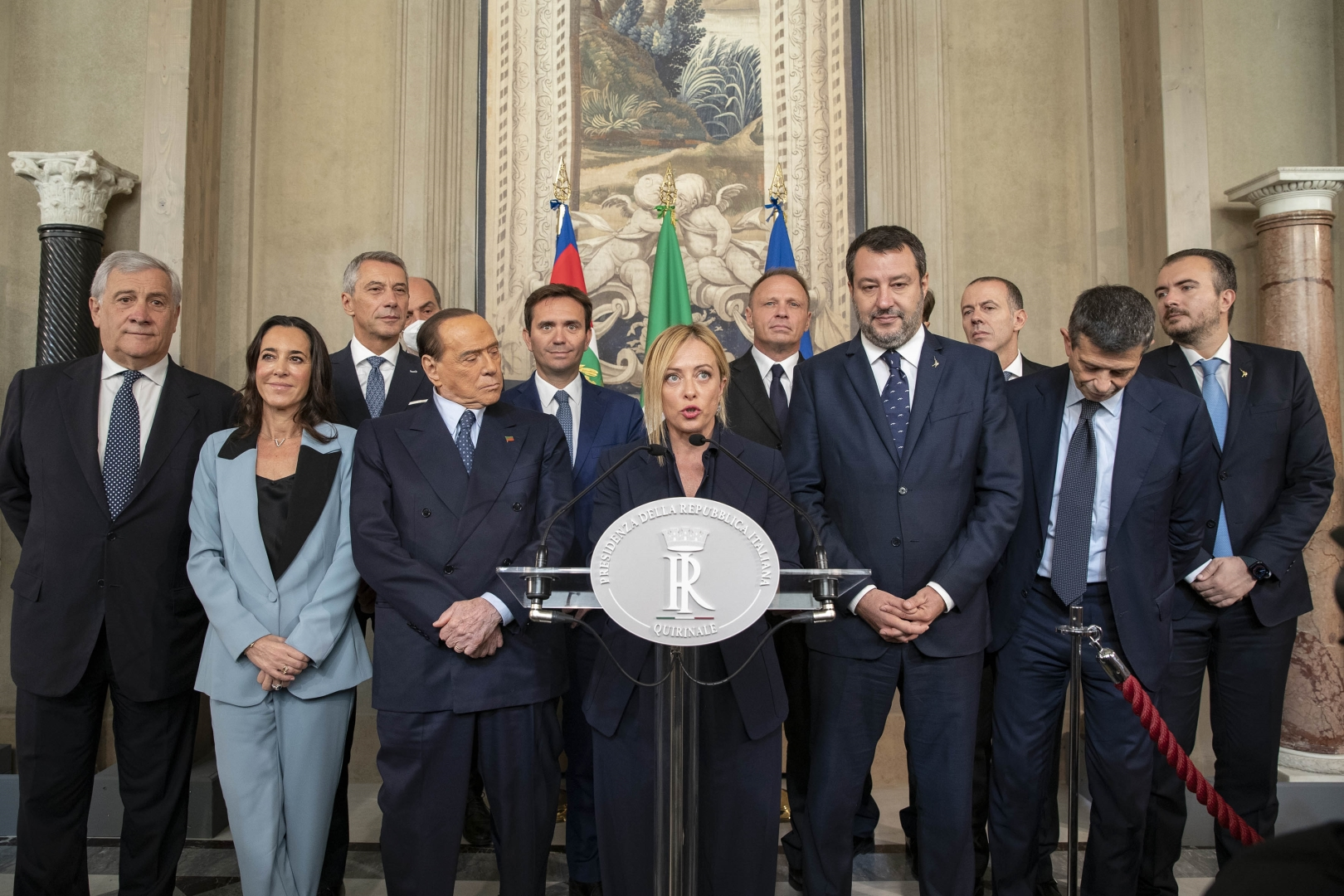
Meloni and the other members of the centre-right coalition at the Quirinal Palace in October 2022

In a record-low voter turnout election, exit polls projected that the centre-right coalition would win a majority of seats in the 2022 general election. Meloni was projected to be the winner of the election with FdI receiving a plurality of seats, and per agreement with the centre-right coalition, which held that the largest party in the coalition would nominate the next prime minister, she was the frontrunner and would become the country's first female prime minister. The PD, head of the centre-left coalition, conceded defeat shortly after the exit polls.

Hungary's Orbán, Poland's Mateusz Morawiecki, United Kingdom's Liz Truss, and Marine Le Pen, former leader of National Rally (RN) in France, congratulated Meloni. European radical right parties and leaders, such as Alternative for Germany and Vox, also celebrated Meloni's results. After many years of absence from politics, Gianfranco Fini, former leader of the MSI and AN during the early years of Meloni's political career, said he had voted for her party and described her as an anti-fascist, despite her rejection of the label, which she considers to be political.

Observers have debated how right-wing a Meloni-led government would be, and which label and position on the political spectrum would be more accurate or realistic. Many variously described it as Italy's first far-right-led government since World War II, and Meloni as the first far-right leader since Benito Mussolini, and some academics also described it as the most right-wing government since 1945. Many questioned its direction, citing Berlusconi's and Salvini's Russian ties, in contrast to Meloni's Atlanticism. Others, such as Sky News, while citing Meloni's and her party's neo-fascist roots, disagreed with the far-right label and said: "Giorgia Meloni is not a fascist." Steve Sedwick of CNBC summarised the discussion, saying: "Have we got a centre-right coalition, have we got a right coalition, have we got a far-right coalition, or have we got a fascist coalition? I have seen all four printed, depending on who you read."

== Prime Minister of Italy (2022–present) ==
=== Government formation ===
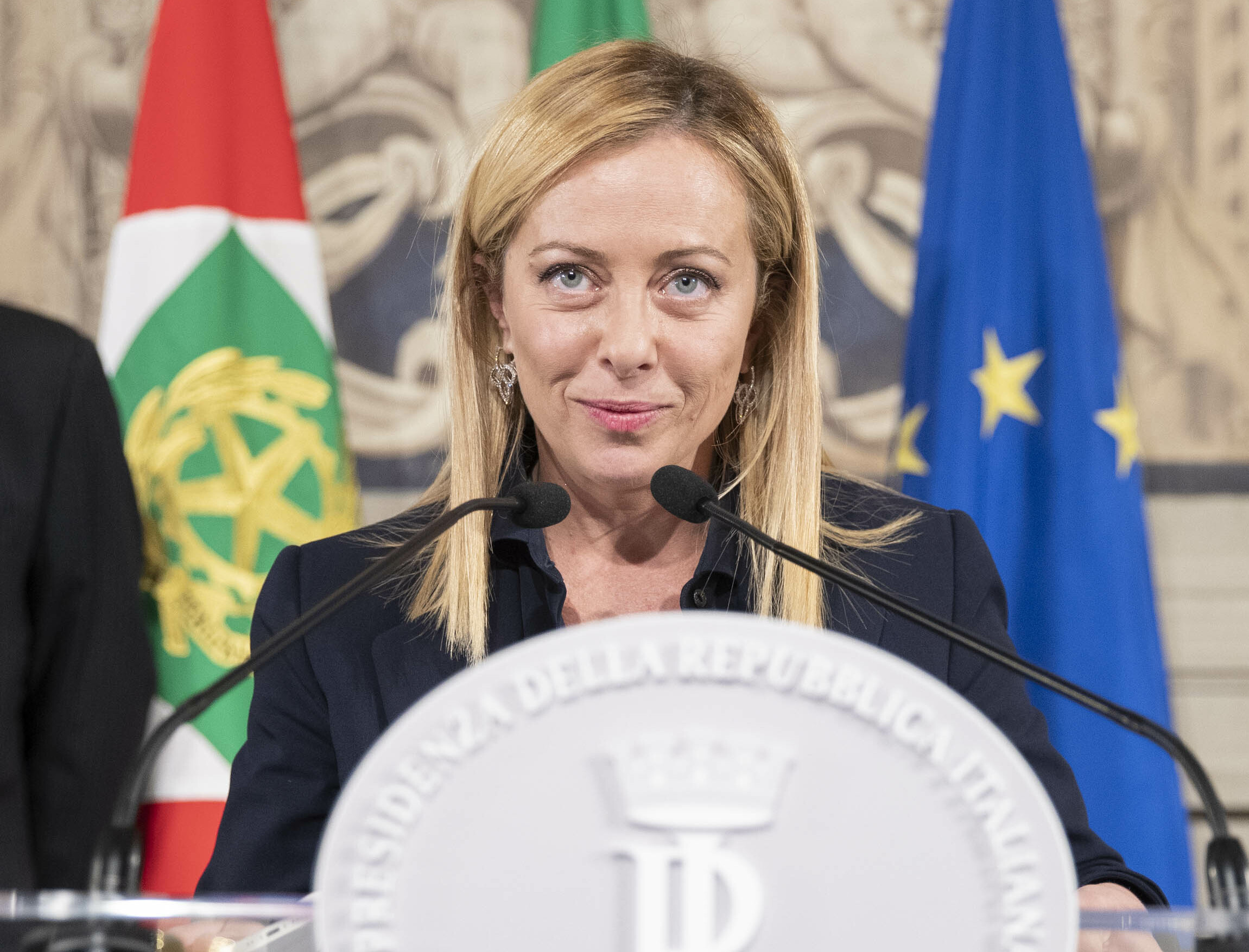
Meloni accepting the task of forming a new government

Immediately after the first meeting of the new legislature, tensions began to grow within the centre-right coalition. On 13 October, Berlusconi refused to support Ignazio La Russa, FdI's candidacy to be president of the Senate of the Republic. He succeeded in being elected by obtaining 116 votes out of 206 in the first round thanks to the support from opposition parties to the centre-right coalition. Tensions further grew, in particular between Berlusconi and Meloni, whom Berlusconi described as "patronising, overbearing, arrogant ... [and] offensive" in a series of written notes in the Senate. In the following days, the centre-right coalition parties reached an agreement on the formation of the new cabinet.

On 20 October, consultations between President Sergio Mattarella and parties officially began. On the following day, delegates from FdI, the League, FI, and Civics of Italy–Us Moderates–MAIE, announced to Mattarella they had reached an agreement to form a coalition government with Meloni as Prime Minister. In the afternoon, Mattarella summoned Meloni to the Quirinal Palace, asking her to form a new government. She accepted the task and on the same day announced the composition of her cabinet, which was officially sworn in on 22 October. She is the first woman to hold the office of Prime Minister of Italy.

On 25 October, Meloni gave her first official speech as prime minister in front of the Chamber of Deputies, before the confidence vote on her cabinet. During her speech, she stressed the weight of being the first woman to serve as head of the Italian government. She thanked several Italian women, including Tina Anselmi, Samantha Cristoforetti, Grazia Deledda, Oriana Fallaci, Nilde Iotti, Rita Levi-Montalcini, and Maria Montessori, who she said, "with the boards of their own examples, built the ladder that today allows me to climb and break the heavy glass ceiling placed over our heads." The government won the confidence vote with a comfortable majority in both houses.

In September 2026, Meloni's government became Italy's longest-serving cabinet since World War II, marking a notable period of political stability in a country historically characterized by frequent changes in government.

=== Domestic policies ===
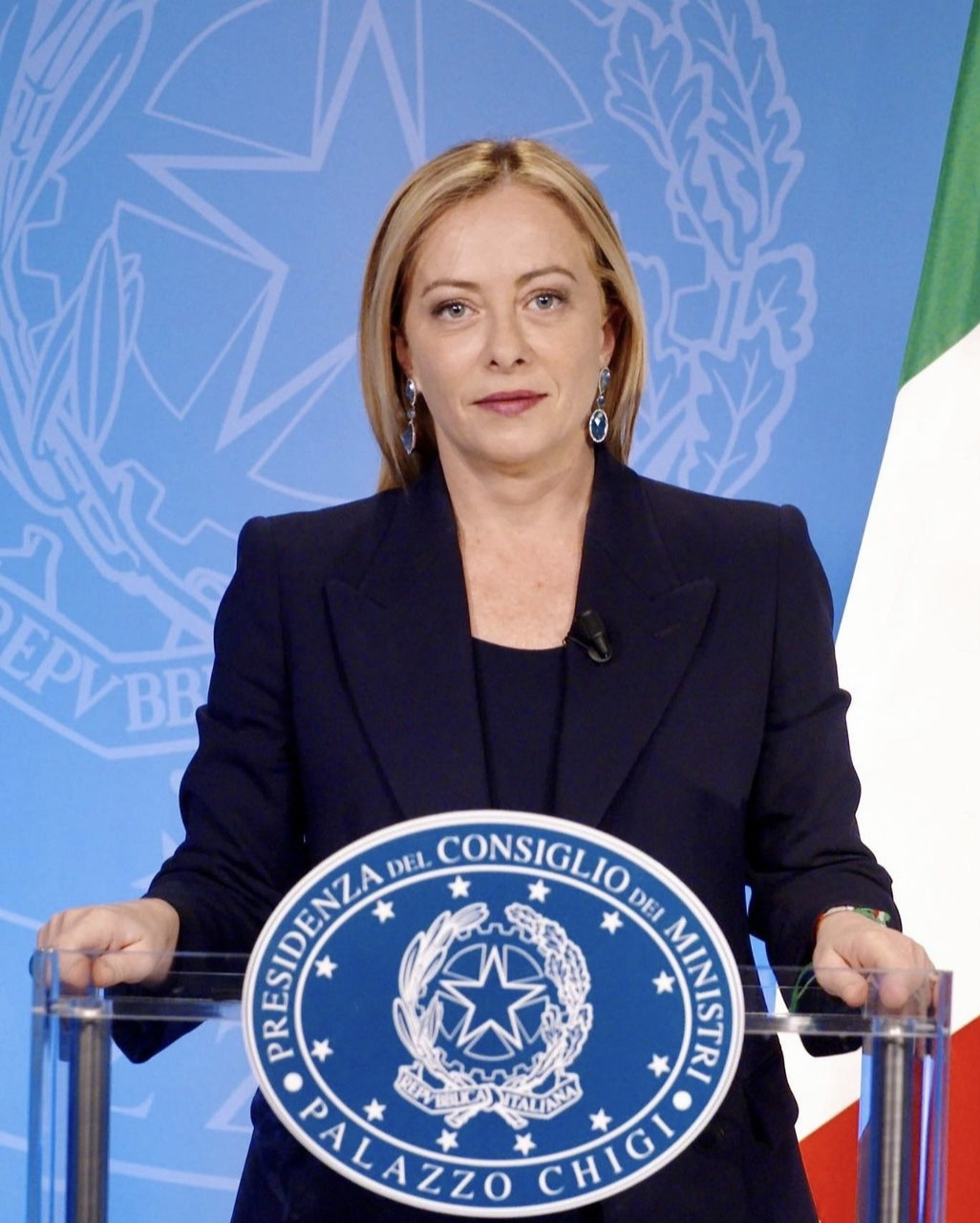
Meloni during a press conference in 2022

One of the first measures implemented by the government regarded COVID-19 and concerned the complete removal of the COVID-19 vaccination certificate, known in Italy as the Green Pass; moreover, non-vaccinated doctors were re-integrated into service. By this time, the government's workforce vaccination mandate had been in place for over one year, rendering the edict largely symbolic. On 31 October, the government approved a decree providing for a penalty of up to six years of imprisonment for illegal parties and rallies. Despite being officially presented as a decree against illegal rave parties, the law was applicable to any illegal gathering that the public authority deemed dangerous, which garnered criticism, including from jurist Vitalba Azzolini.

The decree also caused a lot of protests from opposition parties and civil rights associations, and was also contested by FI. According to Amnesty International, the decree "risked undermining the right to peaceful protest". The Meloni government has rejected the accusations and announced that it will accept minor changes to the text in Parliament. In the first weeks after taking office, Meloni implemented stricter policies than previous governments regarding the fight against illegal immigration.

From an economic point of view, Meloni and her government have decided to prevent the increase in energy prices, in continuity with her predecessor Mario Draghi, by lowering prices, giving subsidies to families and businesses and making new drilling decisions in the Italian seas to increase national gas production. The government also decided to increase the cash ceiling from €2,000 to €5,000.

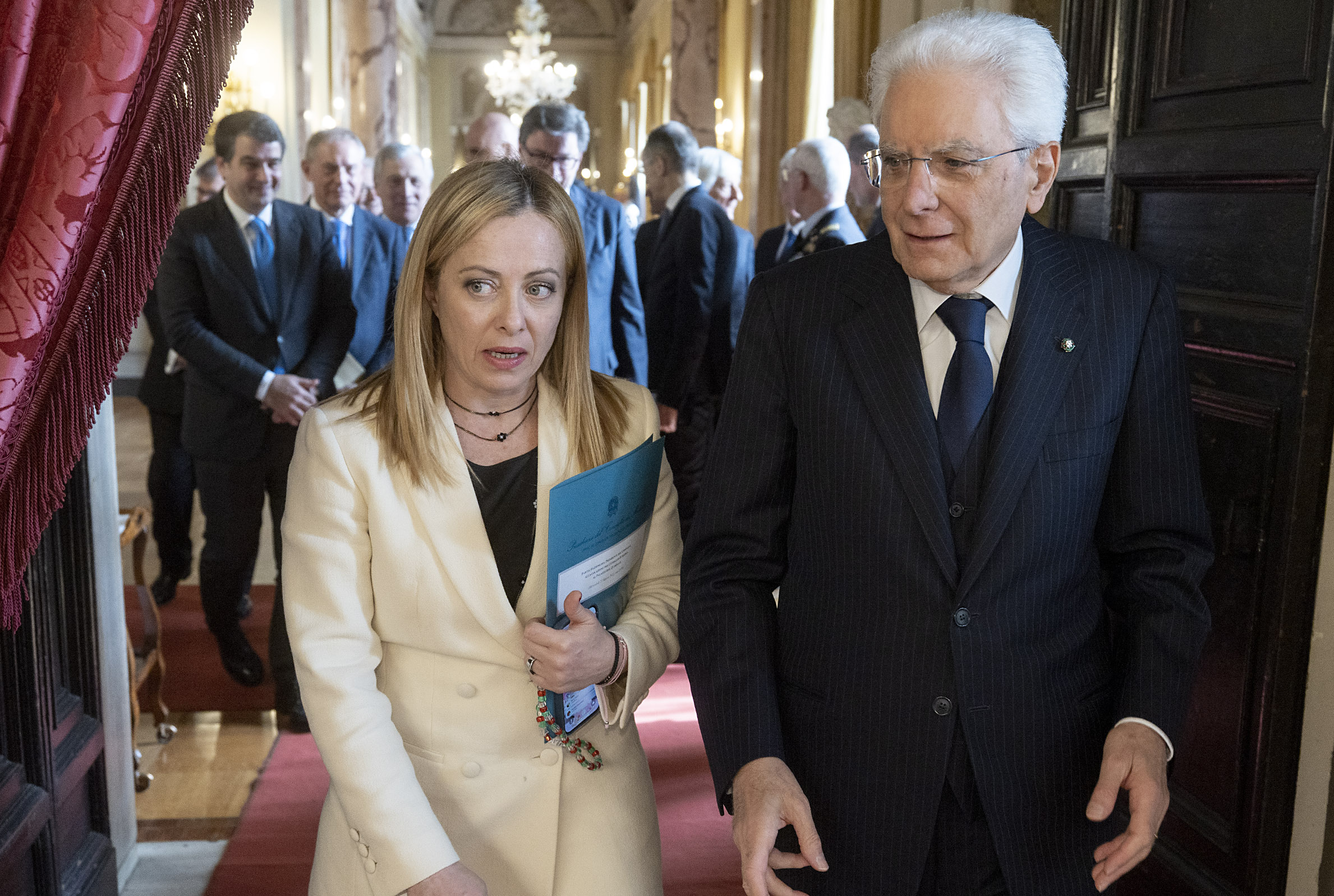
Meloni with President Sergio Mattarella in March 2023

On 26 February 2023, a boat carrying migrants sank amidst harsh weather conditions while trying to land on the coast of Steccato di Cutro, near Crotone, Calabria. The boat was carrying between 143 and 200 migrants when it sank, of whom at least 86 died, including 12 children, becoming one of the deadliest naval disasters in recent years. Meloni expressed her "deep sorrow for the many human lives torn away by human traffickers", and condemned the "exchange" of migrants' lives for "the 'price' of a ticket paid by them in the false prospect for a safe voyage". On 1 March 2023, the new leader of the Democratic Party, Elly Schlein, as well as More Europe and Greens and Left Alliance asked for the resignation of interior minister Matteo Piantedosi.

In March 2023, Italy's Meloni government approved a draft bill banning the production and commercialisation of cultured meat for human and animal consumption; this move, which the government said was intended to protect food heritage.

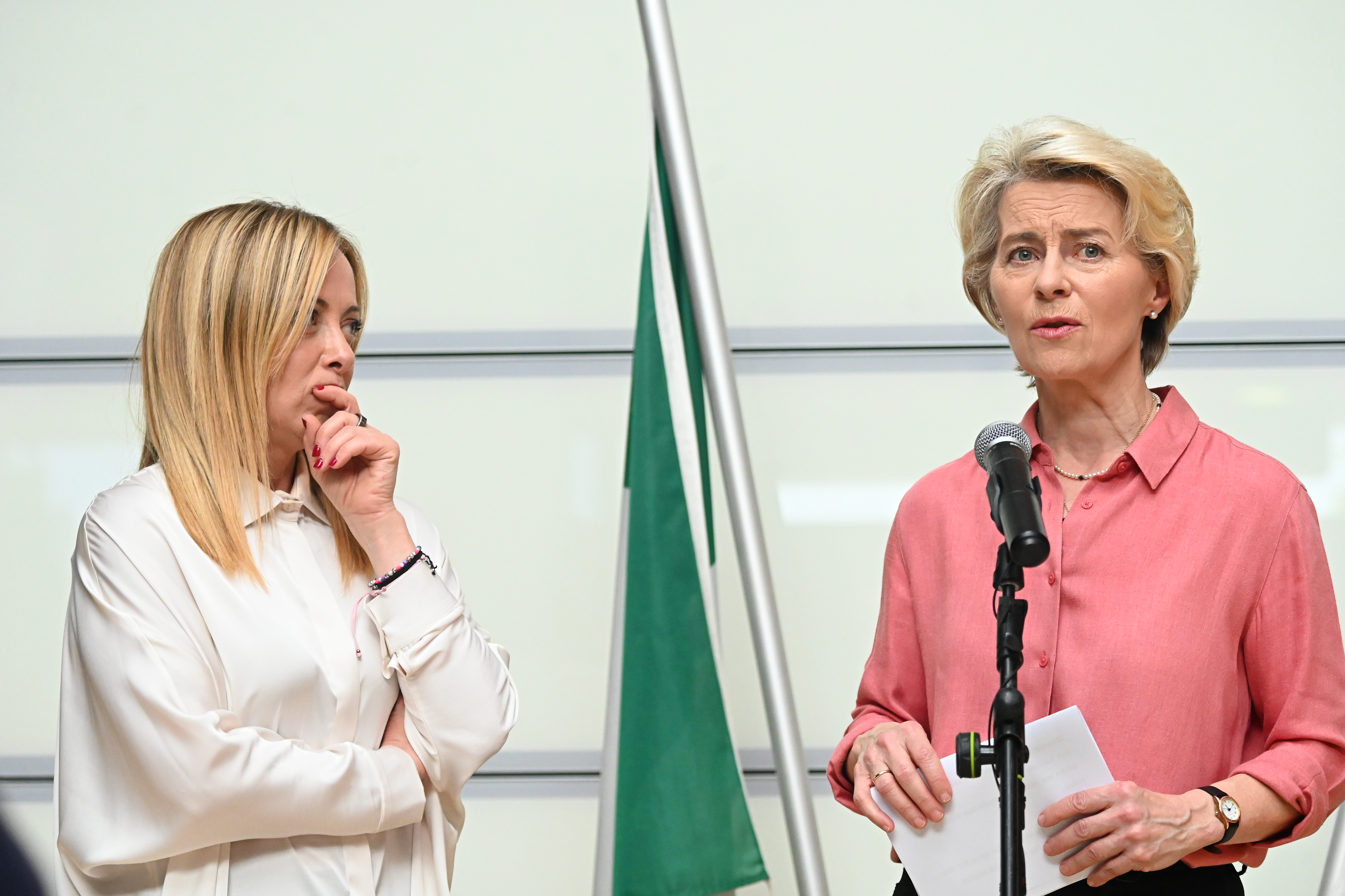
Meloni and European Commission president Ursula von der Leyen during a visit in the flooded area of Emilia-Romagna

In May 2023, the government had to face severe floods which affected Emilia-Romagna region, killing 17 people and displacing 50,000 others. The provisional cost of the damage caused by the floods amounts to more than €10 billion (US$11 billion). On 23 May, Italy's Council of Ministers officially announced the approval of the first law decree in response to the emergency, an estimated €2 billion recovery package that was aimed to public and private businesses, schools, universities, museums and farm workers, among other categories.

On 25 May, Meloni and Ursula von der Leyen, the president of the European Commission, visited the flooded areas along with Bonaccini. Meloni underlined the strong spirit of the Romagnol people, stating: "Usually, when you lose everything, the prevailing feeling is anger, blame-seeking, or resignation. In Emilia-Romagna I found people shoveling mud with pride in their eyes, saying: all right, we have a problem, but we will solve it, we will rebuild." After weeks of tension within the government and between majority and opposition parties, on 27 June 2023 the Meloni cabinet officially appointed army corps general Francesco Paolo Figliuolo as Extraordinary Commissioner for the Reconstruction.

Italy became the first country to ban cultured meat in November 2023, when the government approved the bill.

On 23 January 2024, the bill about "differentiated autonomy" (which aims to give much more autonomy to Italian regions, for a maximum of 23 specific subjects) was approved in the Senate, and it was then approved by the Chamber on 19 June. The law was criticised by the opposition and by various deputies and presidents of southern Italy (both from the majority and the opposition, such as Roberto Occhiuto of Forza Italia, president of Calabria, and Vincenzo De Luca of the PD, president of Campania), accusing the government of wanting to abandon the southern regions, favoring those of the north, and on 20 July a collection of signatures began to call an abrogative referendum.

On 12 August 2024, Meloni characterised as "surrealist" the court case initiated by the European Commission over the Italian government's social policy that favoured Italians over recent non-citizen immigrants. On 16 October 2024, the Senate voted 84–58 in favour of extending a ban on surrogacy to couples who go abroad to avail themselves of the procedure.

=== Law and order policies ===
On 15 June 2023, the Council of Ministers approved, on the proposal of Minister Carlo Nordio, a bill on justice, which abolished the crime of abuse of office and redesigned the appeal procedures in the first instance initiated by prosecutors against acquittals, as well as the use and dissemination of wiretapping. The bill was then be approved by the Senate on 13 February 2024, and then by the Chamber of Deputies on 10 July.

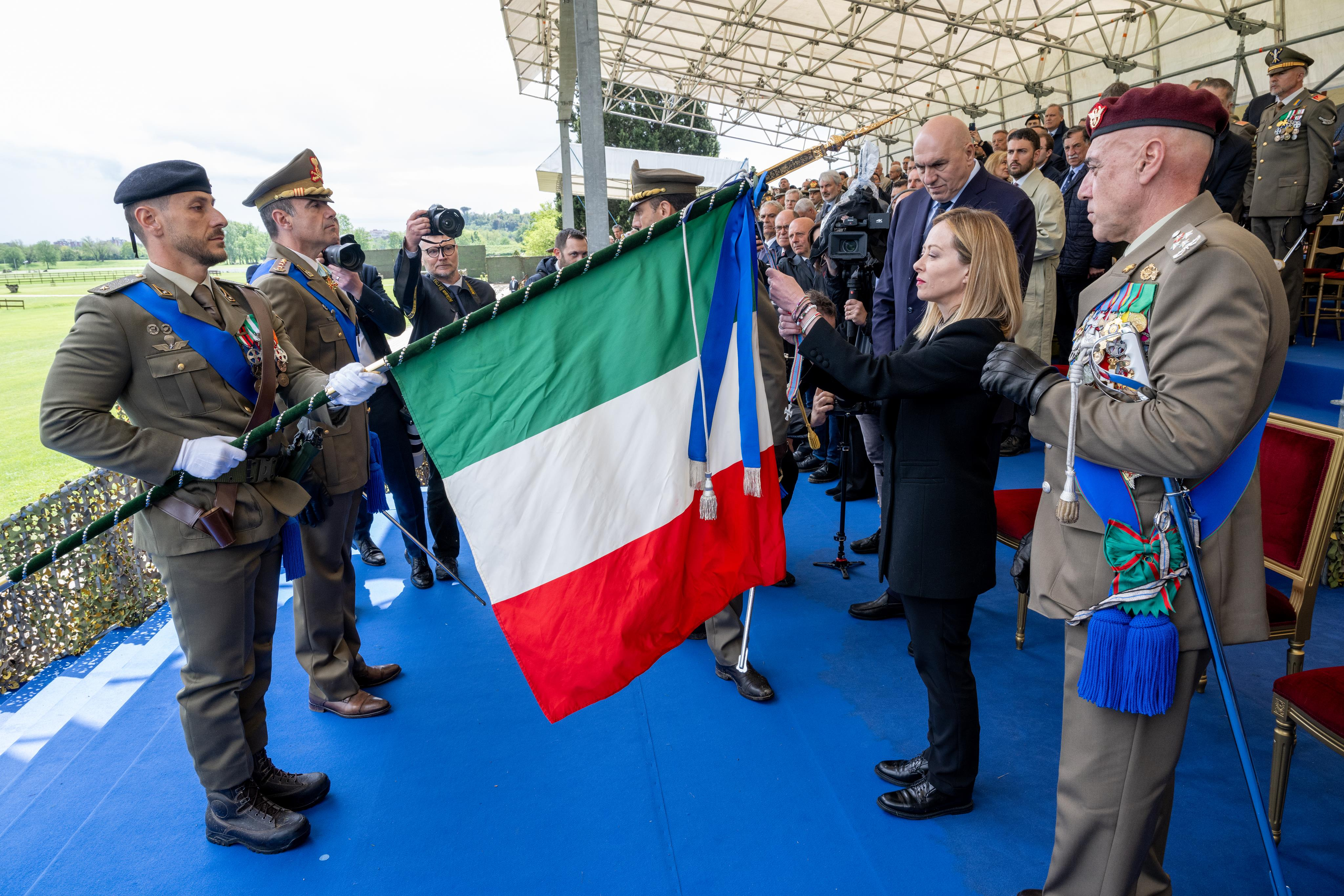
Meloni decorating the flag of the Italian Army

On 18 September 2024, the Chamber of Deputies approved the "Safety Bill" (a modified version of the "safety package" previously approved by the Council of Ministers on 16 November 2023), which covered many subjects: terrorism; scams; protection of law enforcement; banning cannabis (in any form, as well as hemp-containing products); imprisonment (2–7 years) for those who illegally occupy a property; increase in penalties in case of protest (including passive resistance to orders) in prison; the need for a residence permit (for non-EU immigrants) to buy a SIM card; possible imprisonment (1 month if alone, 6 months-2 years if with more people) for those implementing road or railway blockades (even as a protest).

Minister of the Interior Matteo Piantedosi confirmed that the rule about blockades could be applied in some strike cases. The bill was heavily criticised by the oppositions, which labelled it as "liberticidal": in particular, the "anti-Salis rule" (named after Ilaria Salis, an AVS MEP accused of illegal occupation in 2008; however, there was only one identification while she was in the plant at that moment, as the ALER had never initiated investigations, nor criminal or civil cases, in 16 years) and the "anti-Gandhi rule" were criticised, the first one because it aggravated the situation of people who had no home to stay, the second one because it could also prevent peaceful protests, such as those historically led by Gandhi.

The government has also proposed, within the security bill, the expansion of the powers of the secret services (which could participate in and/or direct terrorist or subversive groups), and the obligation for universities and public research bodies to collaborate with the secret services (DIS, AISE, AISI), including communicating private information; both of these proposals have been harshly criticised: the first because in Italy the secret services, during the Years of Lead between 1960s and 1980s, were involved in illicit activities and massacres during the Strategy of Tension, and the second because it would represent an authoritarian turn on universities, with the risk of violating the privacy and communicating the political opinions of students, professors and researchers.

On 4 April 2025, the government approved a decree-law that almost entirely follows the previous security bill (apart from some changes), which had been sent back to the Chamber due to the lack of financial coverage and doubts raised by the President of the Republic Sergio Mattarella, in order to speed up the approval process.

=== Constitutional reform ===
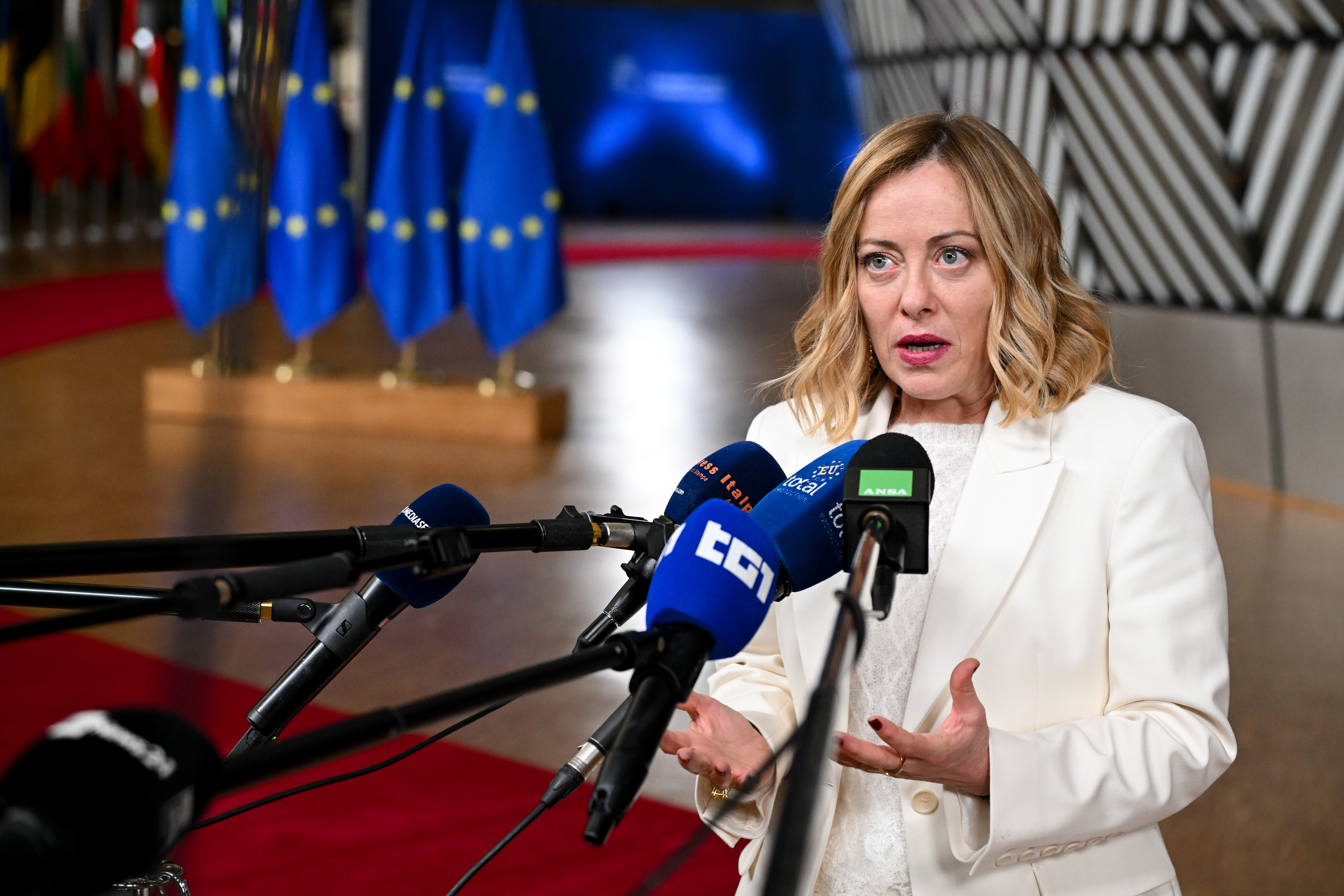
Meloni speaking with the press in 2025

In late December 2022, Meloni announced that Elisabetta Casellati, minister for constitutional reforms, would meet with the opposition parties to officially begin the roadmap towards a constitutional reform to strengthen the powers of the prime minister, even if the coalition's electoral program included only the direct election of the president.

On 3 November 2023, Meloni officially presented the reform which provided the direct election of the prime minister by popular vote, the so-called premierato, and a new electoral law which gave 55% of parliamentary seats in both houses to the coalition that arrives first in the general election. Following new legislation in Italy passed by the Meloni government, only a child's biological parent can be named on their birth certificate.

==== 2026 referendum ====
In March 2026, Meloni's government held a constitutional referendum where voters were asked whether they approved a constitutional law, often called the "Nordio Reform" (Riforma Nordio) after Carlo Nordio (the Minister of Justice), that would amend the Italian Constitution in various aspects, most notably by proposing the constitutional separation of career paths between judges and public prosecutors, the splitting of the High Council of the Judiciary (CSM) into two distinct bodies, and the selection of members by sortition rather than traditional election, and the establishment of a High Disciplinary Court to oversee disciplinary proceedings.

The government-initiated constitutional bill was approved by the Senate of the Republic on 30 October 2025. Since it did not reach the qualified two-thirds majority in each chamber of Italian Parliament during the parliamentary approval process, pursuant to Article 138 of the Italian Constitution, the necessary signatures were collected to request a confirmatory constitutional referendum. A quorum is not required for the referendum to be valid, and the Nordio law submitted to the referendum would be promulgated if confirmed by a majority of valid votes. Meloni's government supported and campaigned in favour of its passing. However, the victory of the "No" side was widely seen as a blow to her government and a boost to opposition parties ahead of the 2027 general election.

=== Foreign policy ===
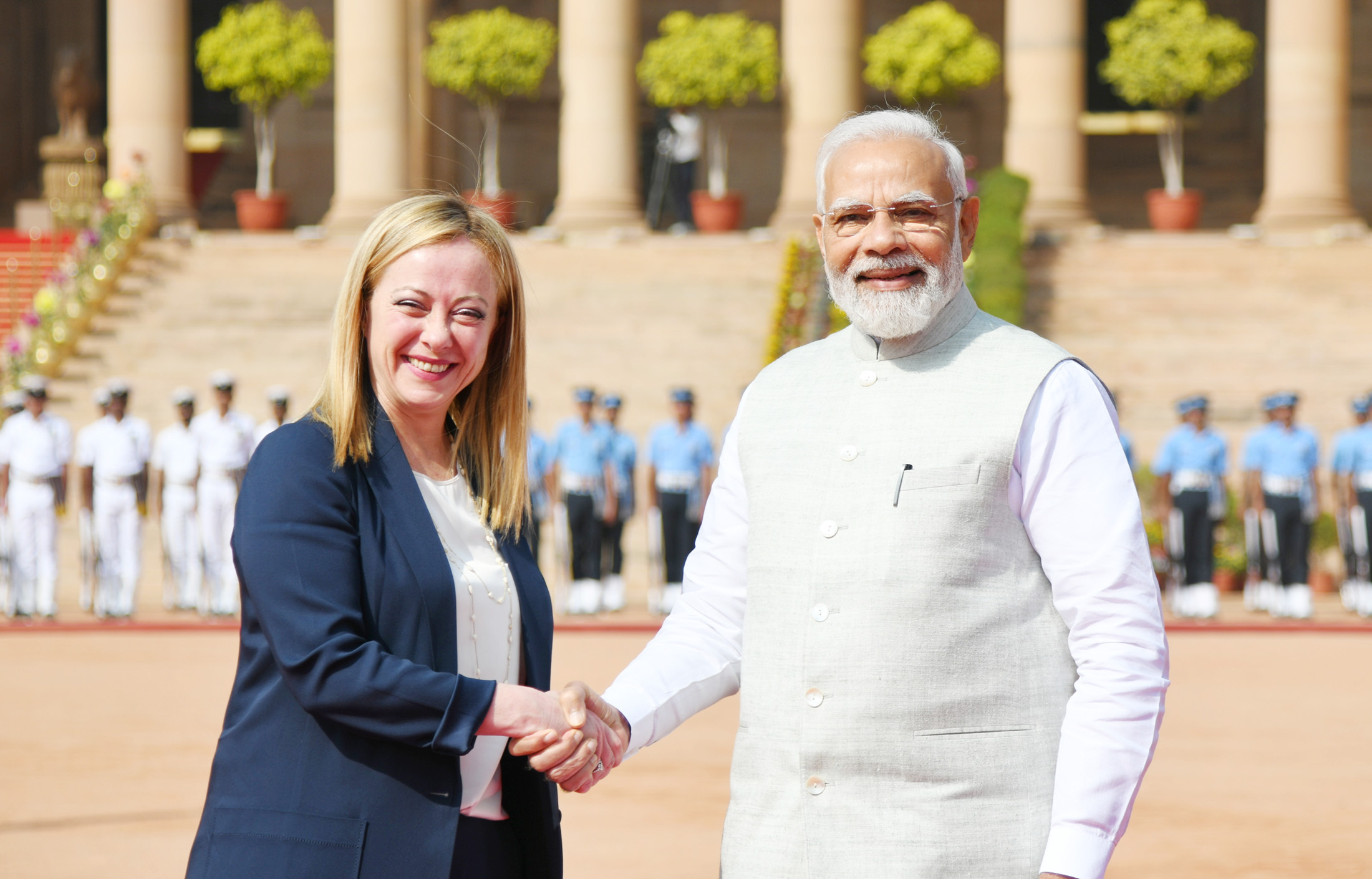
Meloni with Indian prime minister Narendra Modi in March 2023

The first foreign leader met by Meloni was the French president Emmanuel Macron, who was in Rome on 23 October 2023 to meet President Sergio Mattarella and Pope Francis, and had a bilateral meeting with Meloni, primarily focused on the ongoing energy crisis and the Russian invasion of Ukraine. On 3 November 2023, Meloni met European Union (EU) leaders such as Ursula von der Leyen, Charles Michel, Paolo Gentiloni, Roberta Metsola, and other politicians in Brussels.

On 7 November 2023, Meloni took part in her first international summit, the United Nations COP27 (Climate Change Conference) in Sharm El Sheikh, Egypt. During her speech, Meloni stated: "Italy remains strongly convinced of its commitment to decarbonisation in compliance with the Paris Agreement. We must diversify energy suppliers, in close collaboration with African countries." During the conference, the prime minister also had a bilateral meeting with the Egyptian president Abdel Fattah el-Sisi. In the following week, Meloni participated in the G20 summit in Bali, Indonesia, where she had her first bilateral meeting with the U.S. president Joe Biden on 15 November 2023.

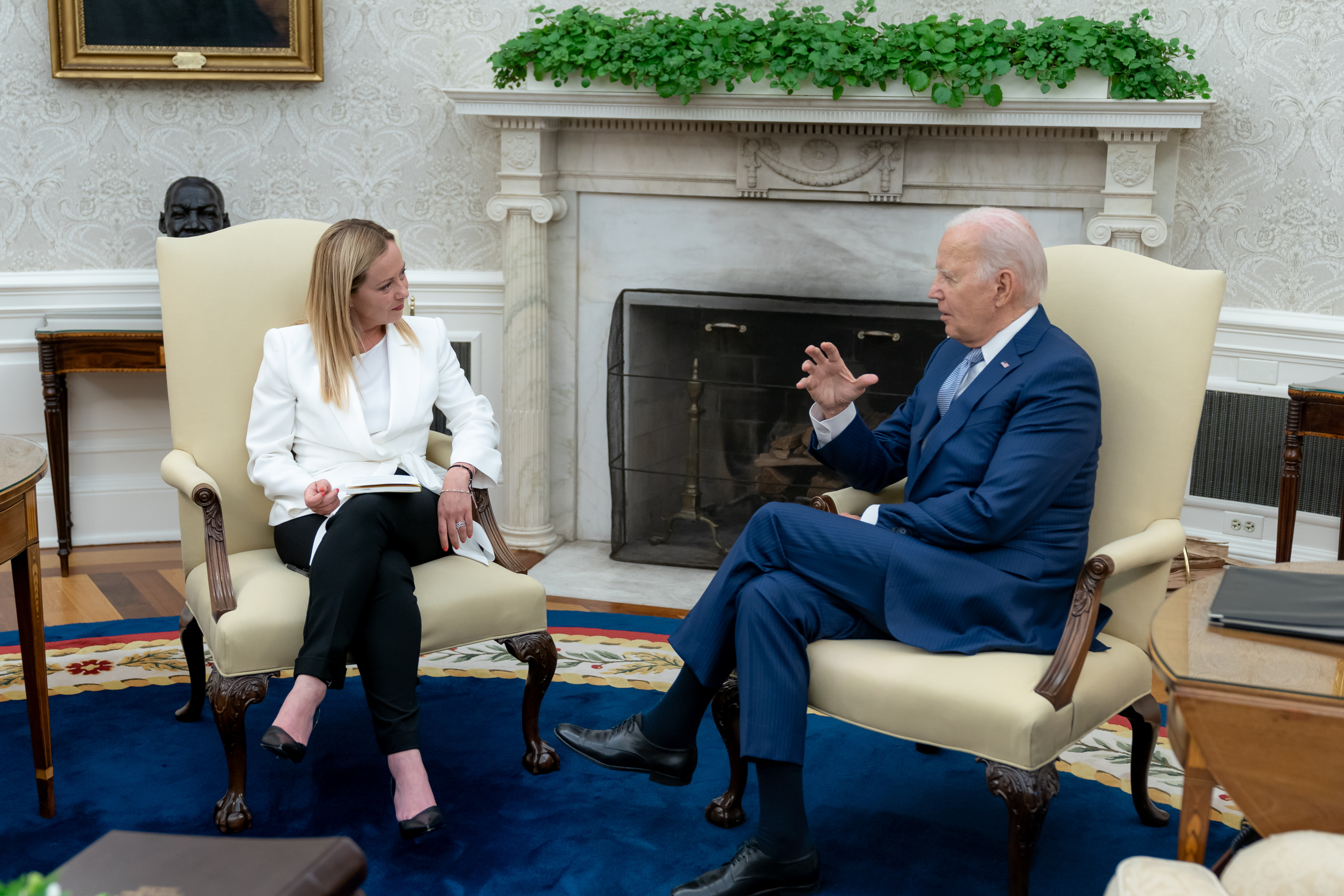
Meloni with U.S. president Joe Biden at the White House in July 2023

In January 2023, Meloni visited Algeria, where she met President Abdelmadjid Tebboune with whom she signed a deal regarding gas supply to Italy. Thanks to this deal, Algeria will become Italy's largest gas supplier.

On 22 February 2023, Meloni visited Ukraine and met with President Volodymyr Zelenskyy to discuss the ongoing Russian invasion. Meloni also visited Bucha, in the suburbs of Kyiv, where the Russian forces killed more than 400 Ukrainians in March 2022. Meloni stressed that Ukraine can count on Italy, adding, "we have been with Ukraine from the beginning and will be until the end." She was an ally of Polish prime minister Mateusz Morawiecki and has praised Poland's support for Ukraine and Poland's acceptance of large numbers of Ukrainian refugees.

On 2 March 2023, Meloni visited India, where she met Prime Minister Narendra Modi and President Droupadi Murmu. During a press conference, Meloni praised Modi and his policies, describing him as the "most loved leader in the world". In March 2023, she hosted Israeli Prime Minister Benjamin Netanyahu in Rome.

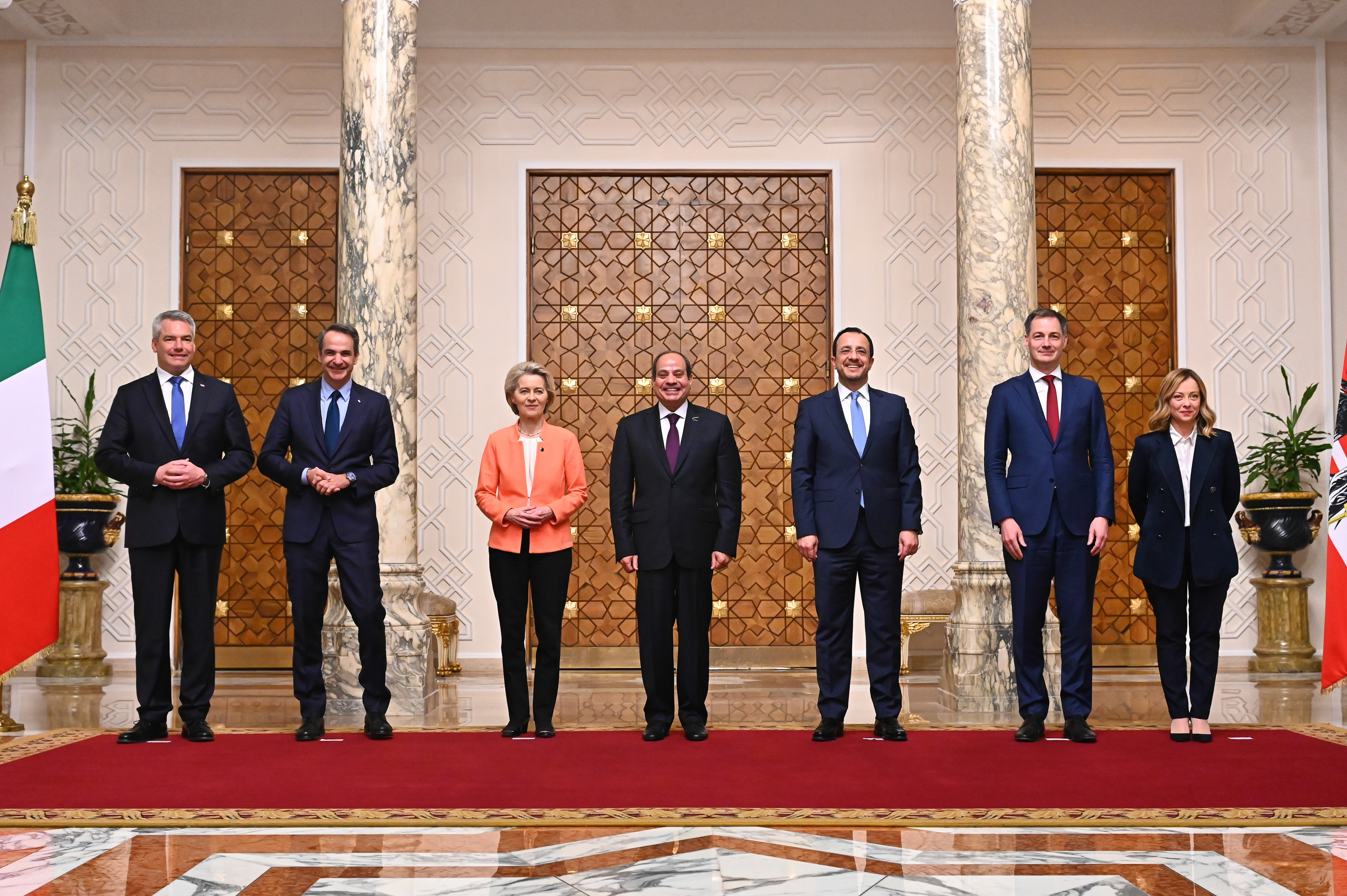
Meloni with Egyptian president Abdel Fattah el-Sisi and European Commission president Ursula von der Leyen in Cairo, 17 March 2024

In April 2023, Meloni had an official visit to Ethiopia, where she met Prime Minister Abiy Ahmed and Somali president Hassan Sheikh Mohamud. In Addis Ababa, Meloni announced the so-called "Mattei Plan" by the Italian government regarding investments in the African continent. Meloni was the first Western leader to visit Ethiopia since the end of the Tigray War. During the visit, she also had a bilateral meeting with the chair of the African Union Commission Moussa Faki.

In May 2023, Meloni attended the 49th G7 summit in Hiroshima, Japan. On 16 July, Prime Minister Meloni, along with European Commission president Ursula von der Leyen and Dutch Prime Minister Mark Rutte, travelled to Tunis in order to sign an agreement with President Kais Saied regarding the strengthening of the economic partnership between Europe and Tunisia, the European diplomatic support for the disbursement of the loan from IMF and, especially, the fight against irregular migration flows. She considered withdrawing from China's Belt and Road Initiative.

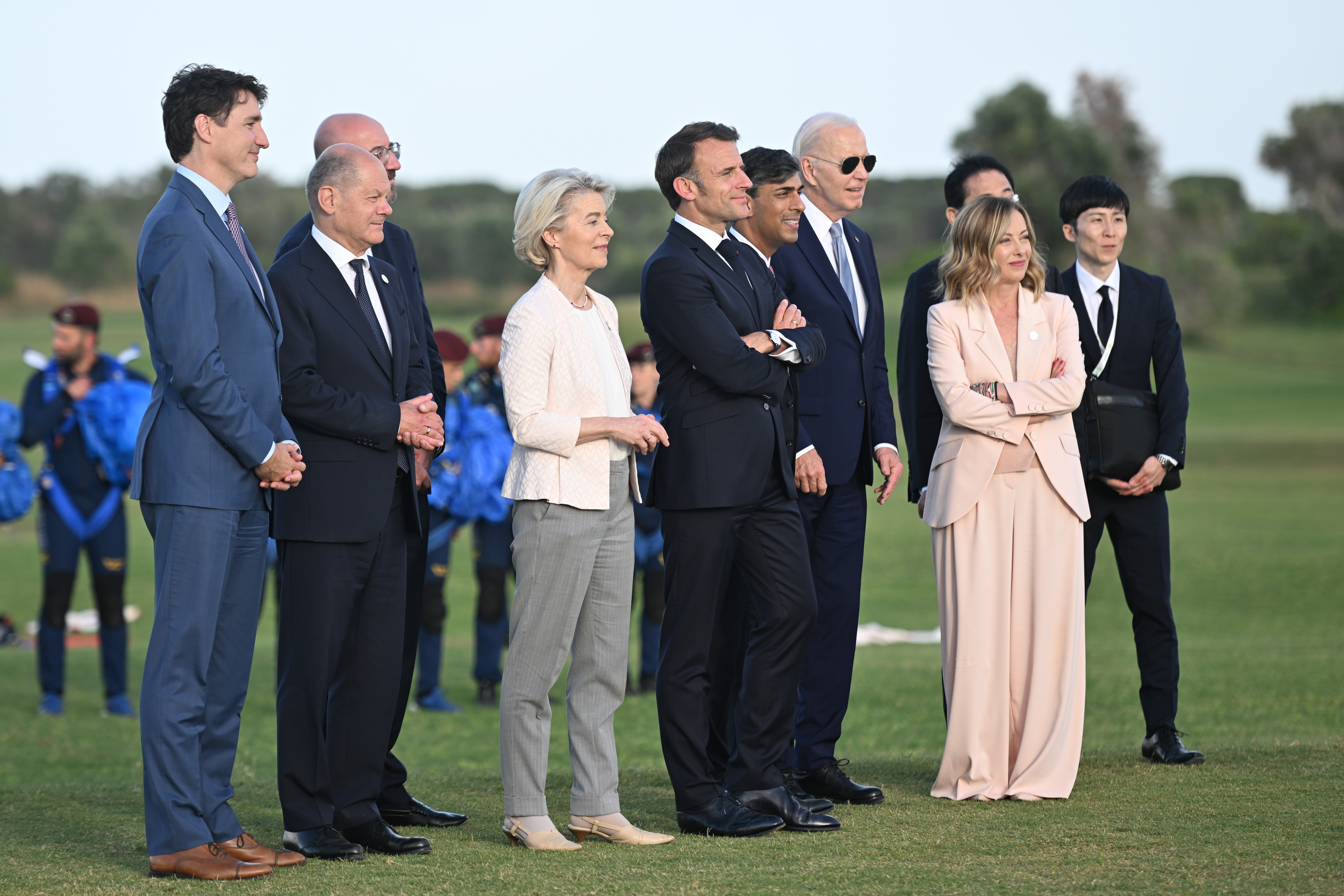
Meloni and the other G7 leaders during the 50th summit in Italy, June 2024

In July 2023, she had an official trip to the United States. On 27 July, Meloni visited the U.S. Capitol where she met with Speaker of the House Kevin McCarthy, Senate Majority Leader Chuck Schumer and Minority Leader Mitch McConnell. Later she met with U.S. president Joe Biden at the White House, where they discussed many issues, including Ukraine, China, and Africa. They also talked about the strengthening of economic exchange between the two countries, trade relations between Europe and the U.S., security policies and the forthcoming G7 Italian presidency. After the start of the Gaza war, Meloni stated her support for "Israel's full right to defend itself in accordance with international law, and to live in peace". In October 2024, she condemned Israeli attacks on UNIFIL bases in Lebanon.

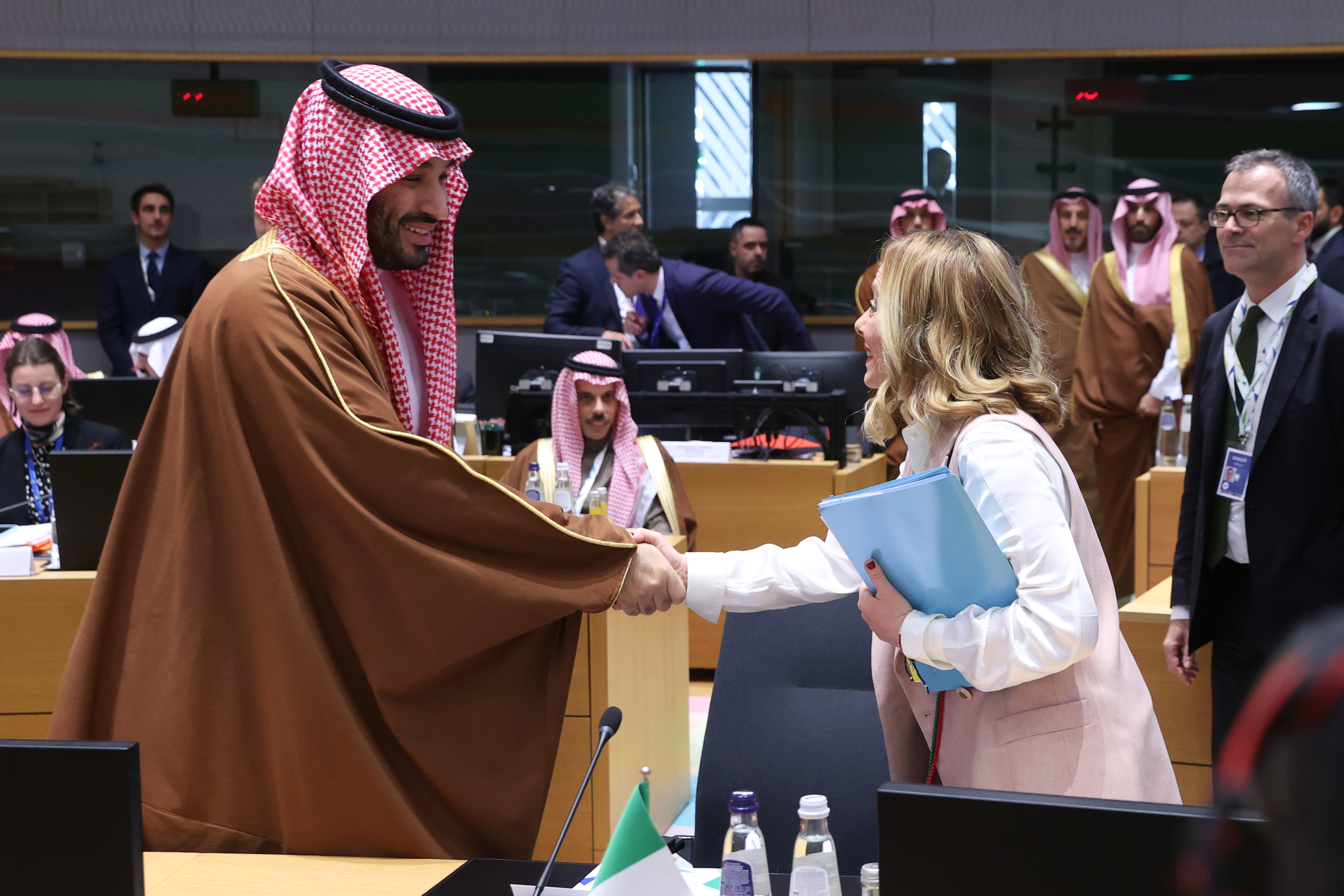
Meloni and Saudi crown prince Mohammed bin Salman at the EU-Gulf Cooperation Council summit in Brussels, 16 October 2024

On 28 April 2024, Meloni announced that she would run for a seat in the European Parliament in elections due to be held in June. In the election, her party remained the most voted in the country with 28.8% of votes, and Meloni became the most voted candidate in the election.

From 13 to 15 June, Meloni hosted the 50th G7 summit in Borgo Egnazia, Apulia. The topics discussed included the ongoing wars in Ukraine and the Middle East, Climate Change, China, migration, and the economy. Francis became the first pope to address a G7 summit.

On 18 October 2024, Meloni travelled to Lebanon and assured the solidarity of Italy with Lebanon and UNIFIL in the current conflict. In a joint statement to the press with Lebanese acting prime minister Najib Mikati she concluded: "To conclude – you prime minister you know you can always count on Italy. We will do all that is in our power to return peace and prosperity to this friend nation." (original, she spoke in English)

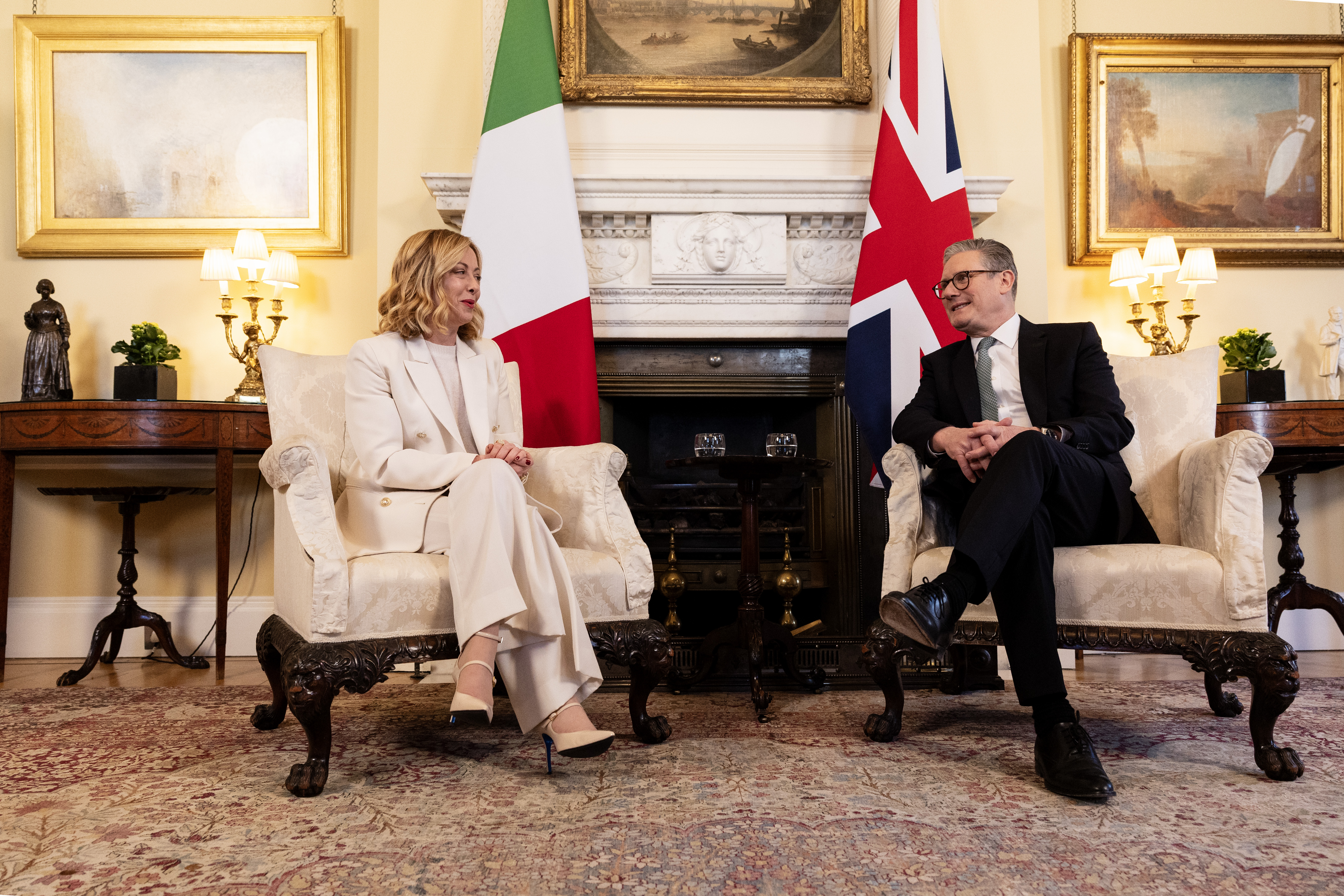
Meloni with the UK prime minister Keir Starmer in 2025

On 19 December 2024, the Italian journalist Cecilia Sala was arrested in Tehran and put in solitary confinement in Evin Prison. This became known only on 27 December. On 30 December, Iran's Ministry of Culture finally confirmed that they had arrested her for "violating the laws of the Islamic Republic". Her arrest came three days after Italy arrested Iranian engineer Mohammad Abedini Najafabadi at Milan Malpensa Airport at the request of the United States, which accused him, together with an accomplice arrested in the country, of conspiring to circumvent embargoes and supplying sophisticated electronic components from the United States to Iran.

On 3 January 2025, Iran reportedly asked for a prisoner swap. On 8 January 2025, Meloni announced that Sala had been released by Iranian authorities and had left the country, landing at Rome Ciampino Airport on Wednesday afternoon, where she was welcomed by Meloni herself. On 12 January, Abedini was released back to Iran.

On 19 January 2025, the Libyan general Osama Elmasry Njeem, better known as Almasri, was arrested after the Juventus–Milan match near the Juventus Stadium in Turin, and transported to the Vallette prison. Almasri was indicted by the International Criminal Court (ICC) of The Hague for war crimes. Subsequently, the court of appeal of Rome ordered his release on 21 January due to the irregularity of the arrest, which resulted from the lack of approval from the Ministry of Justice.

After his release, the Libyan military officer was expelled and repatriated to Libya aboard a Falcon 900 aircraft of the Italian intelligence services. On 27 January, following a report filed with the Rome prosecutor's office by lawyer Luigi Li Gotti, the Tribunal of Ministers was involved to assess whether Prime Minister Meloni, Minister of the Interior Matteo Piantedosi, Minister of Justice Carlo Nordio, and Undersecretary to the Presidency of the Council of Ministers Alfredo Mantovano should be investigated for aiding and abetting and embezzlement.

In a video posted on social media, Meloni said: "Curiously, the [ICC] did so just when this person was about to enter Italian territory, after he had peacefully stayed in three other European states for twelve days." According to writer and journalist Roberto Saviano, the repatriation affair would have been completely buried without the intervention of some Italian media outlets focused on immigration and the Libyan mafia's control over illegal immigration, who were the first to report the news.

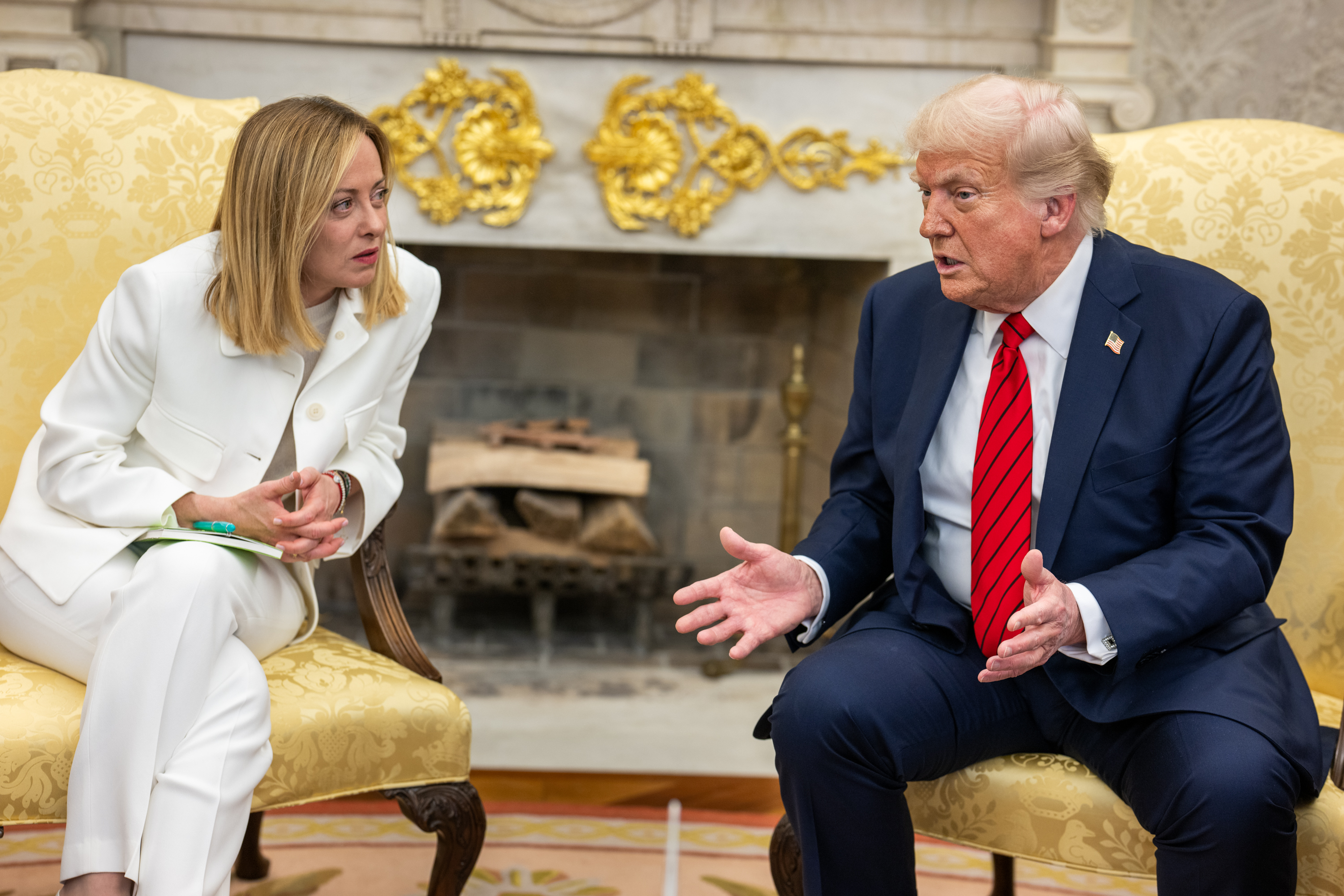
Meloni with U.S. president Donald Trump at the White House in April 2025

On 17 April, after discussing with Ursula von der Leyen strategies on how to approach the meeting, she visited Washington, D.C. and met with U.S. president Donald Trump (who had recently imposed significant tariffs on almost all foreign imports); this visit constituted the first step towards trade talks between the EU and the US. Meloni received a warm welcome from Trump, who praised her conservative stances and accepted her invitation for a state visit to Italy.

On 27 August 2025, Meloni criticised Israel's military actions in Gaza, specifically condemning the killing of five journalists in an airstrike on Nasser Hospital in Khan Younis as "unjustifiable". While reiterating support for Israel's right to defense following the 7 October attack, she added that the military reaction had "gone beyond the principle of proportionality" and resulted in excessive civilian casualties.

In September 2025, Meloni faced large general strikes for her policies towards the Gaza war and in response to Israeli military attacks on the Global Sumud Flotilla. Meloni condemned the violence between demonstrators and police forces. She referred to the protesters as "hooligans", arguing that clashing with law enforcement and damaging public property would not contribute to supporting the Palestinian cause.

Meloni's government took a pro-Israel position throughout the crisis, aligning with Israel and ruling out any recognition of the State of Palestine, unlike several other European countries that had endorsed such recognition during the 80th session of the United Nations General Assembly. Her stance drew criticism from opposition parties, which accused the government of isolating Italy diplomatically. Meloni refused to recognise the State of Palestine as long as Hamas remained in power in Gaza.

Meloni condemned the 28 February 2026 missile strike on a school in Minab, Iran, describing the incident as a 'massacre'. She called for accountability for the tragedy, which occurred during U.S.-Israeli strikes against Iran.

== Political positions ==
Some observers have described Meloni's political positions as far-right, and have highlighted her campaign appearances with Rachele Mussolini. In August 2018, Friedel Taube wrote in Deutsche Welle that "Giorgia Meloni has a long history in far-right politics". In a July 2022 interview with Nicholas Farrell of The Spectator, Meloni rejected descriptions of her politics as far right, calling it a smear campaign by her opponents and cited British conservative philosopher Roger Scruton as one of her influences. She has described herself as a mainstream conservative. Additionally, Meloni has been described as hard right, right-wing populist, and nationalist.

Meloni has been described as being close to Viktor Orbán, the former prime minister of Hungary and leader of Fidesz, and Rishi Sunak, the former British prime minister and Conservatives leader. She has also been linked with the Vox political party in Spain, representatives of the Law and Justice party in Poland, and the Republican Party in the United States. Meloni has self-described her political party, Brothers of Italy (FdI), as a mainstream conservative party. She is in favour of presidentialism and supports changes to the Constitution of Italy.

In June 2024, Meloni criticised the EU ban on the sale of new petrol and diesel cars from 2035 that would "condemn [Europe] to new strategic dependencies, such as China's electric [vehicles]". According to Meloni: "Reducing polluting emissions is the path we want to follow, but with common sense."

=== Social issues ===
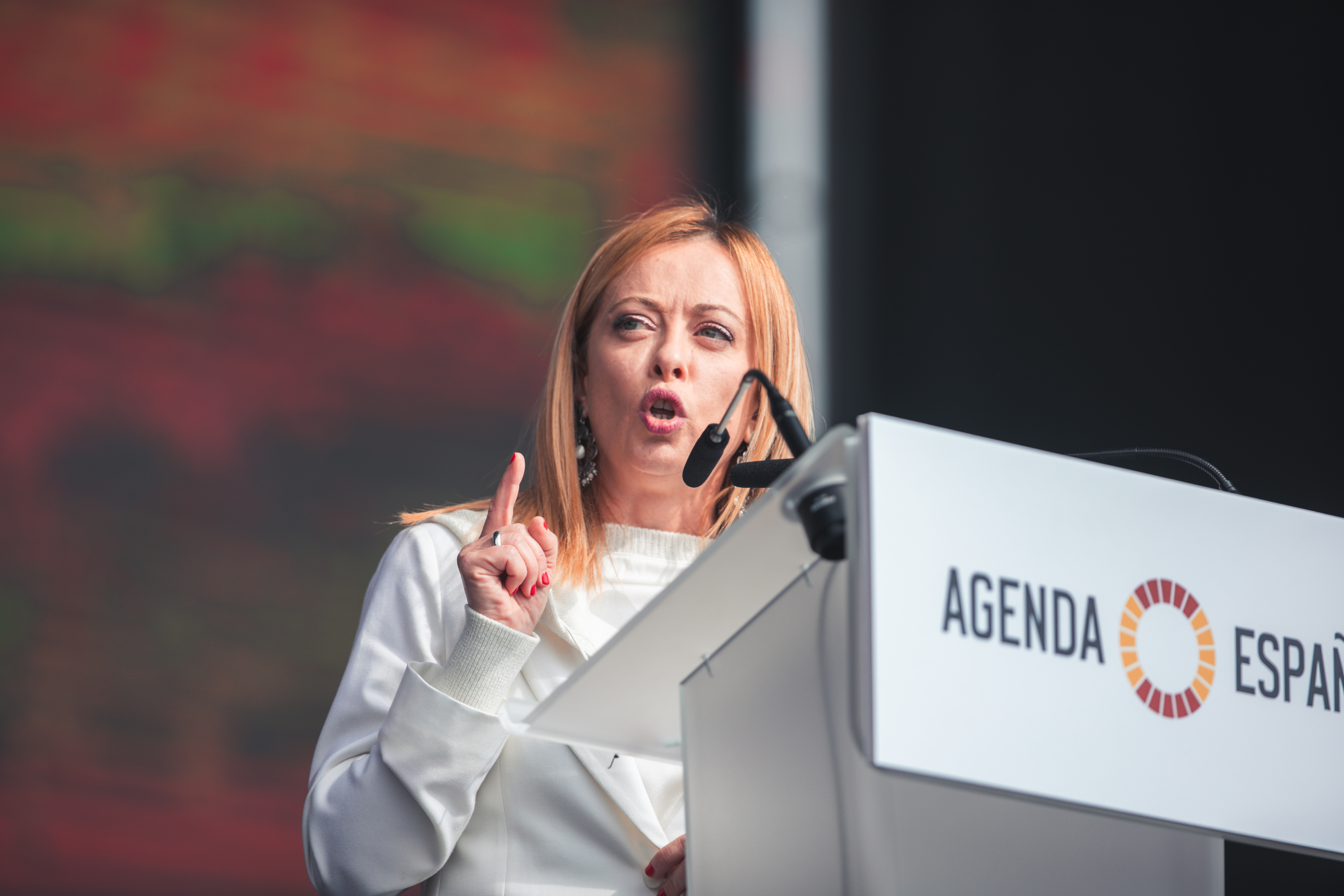
Meloni speaking at a Vox rally in Málaga, Spain

Meloni opposes abortion, euthanasia, and laws that recognise same-sex marriage, and describes herself as "pro-family". She has said she "wouldn't change" the abortion law in Italy but wanted to apply more fully the part of the law "about prevention", such as permitting doctors to refuse to carry them out (conscientious objection to abortion). She also stated that the recognition of same-sex unions in Italy is good enough, and she said it was something she would not change; in 2016, while she said she would respect the law if elected mayor of Rome, she had supported a referendum to abrogate the civil union law. At a rally at the Piazza del Popolo in October 2019, she spoke against same-sex parenting; her speech became viral on Italian social media platforms. During a February 2016 interview to Le Iene, an Italian television show, she had also said that she would "rather not have a gay child".

Meloni has opposed the 1993 Mancino law, a hate speech law. She is opposed to the DDL Zan, an anti-homophobia law that would expand the Mancino law to cover LGBT discrimination, declaring in 2020 that "there is no homophobia" in Italy. She is also opposed to surrogacy, which is pejoratively known in Italian as utero in affitto ('uterus renting'), and she has pushed in Parliament for a law to make it a "universal crime"; her efforts have been endorsed by the Catholic Church and by Pope Francis himself.

Meloni is supportive of the anti-gender movement, based on Catholic theology in the 1990s that condemns gender studies, and she is sceptical of what she calls "gender ideology"; she says it is being taught in schools, and that it attacks female identity and motherhood. She is supportive of changing the Constitution of Italy to make it illegal for same-sex couples to adopt children. In March 2018, she criticised The Walt Disney Company for the decision to represent a gay couple in the musical fantasy film Frozen II. On Facebook, she wrote: "Enough! We are sick of it! Take your hands off the children."

==== Feminism ====
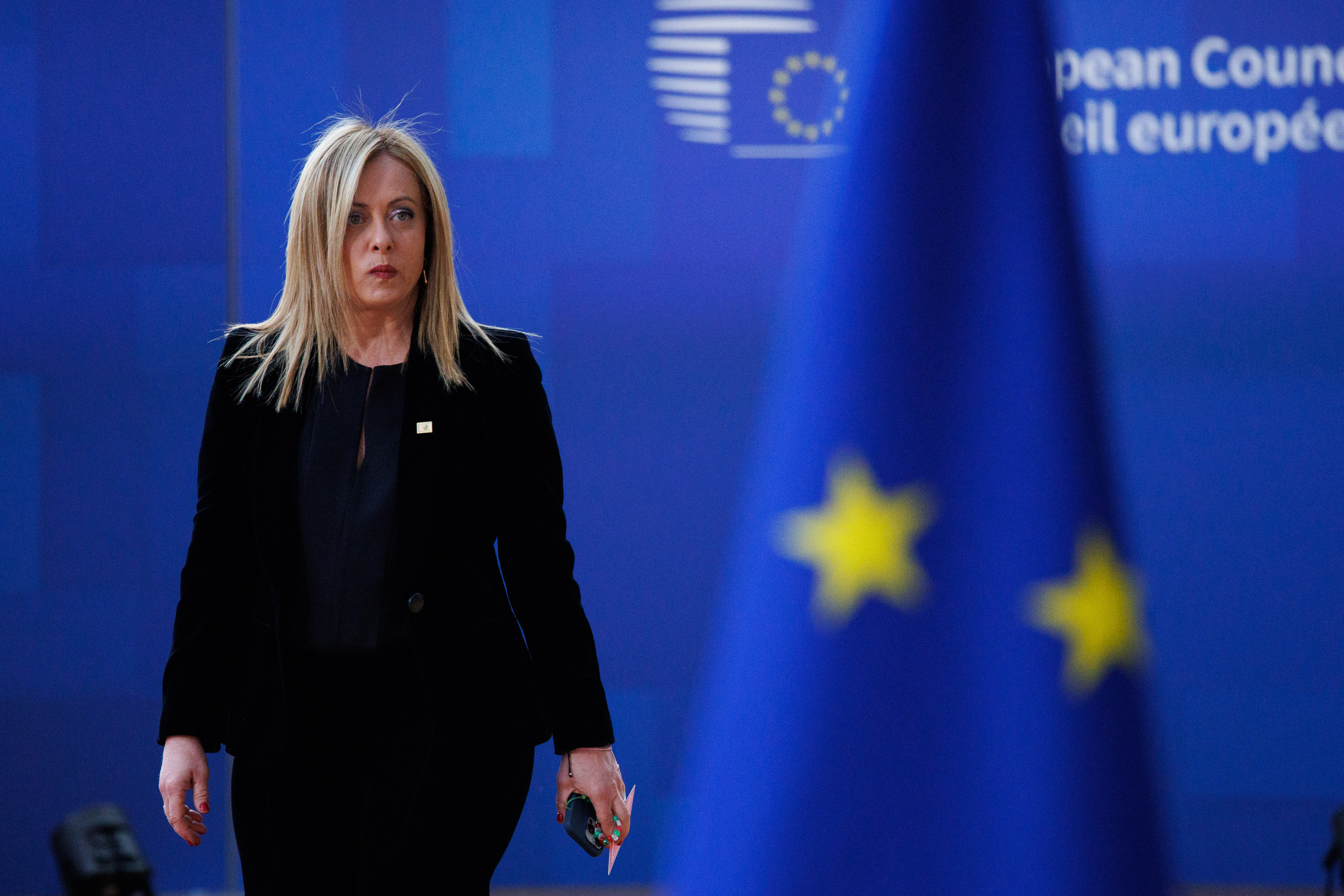
Meloni at the European Council in March 2023

In her 2011 book We Believe, Meloni wrote: "I am a right-wing woman, and I proudly support women's issues. In recent years we have had to suffer contempt and racism by feminists. ... Perhaps as far as feminism is conceived in this way, it is more a question of ideology than of gender and substance." She is opposed to pink quotas and has denied being anti-women as accused by some critics.

The possibility of Meloni becoming the first woman to become Prime Minister of Italy had been widely discussed both prior to and after the 2022 Italian general election. Some women did not see this as a victory due to her political positions, while others saw it at least partly in a positive light, and a few others called her a feminist despite Meloni's rejection of the label. Prior to the election, former U.S. secretary of state Hillary Clinton commented: "The election of the first woman prime minister in a country always represents a break with the past, and that is certainly a good thing."

This prompted a response from some critics and observers, including historians Ruth Ben-Ghiat and David Broder. Ben-Ghiat wrote: "Meloni would also represent continuity with Italy's darkest episode." For her part, Meloni declared herself ready to govern and criticised feminists. In August 2025, Mihail Neamțu wrote: "Unlike Thatcher's emphasis on economic freedoms, and unlike modern feminism's insistence on rights and recognition, Meloni grounds her conservatism in a deeper sense of duty [...] a vision of womanhood that is not a repudiation of tradition, but its vindication." In November 2025, Meloni supported the passing of the law against femicide.

=== Immigration and multiculturalism ===
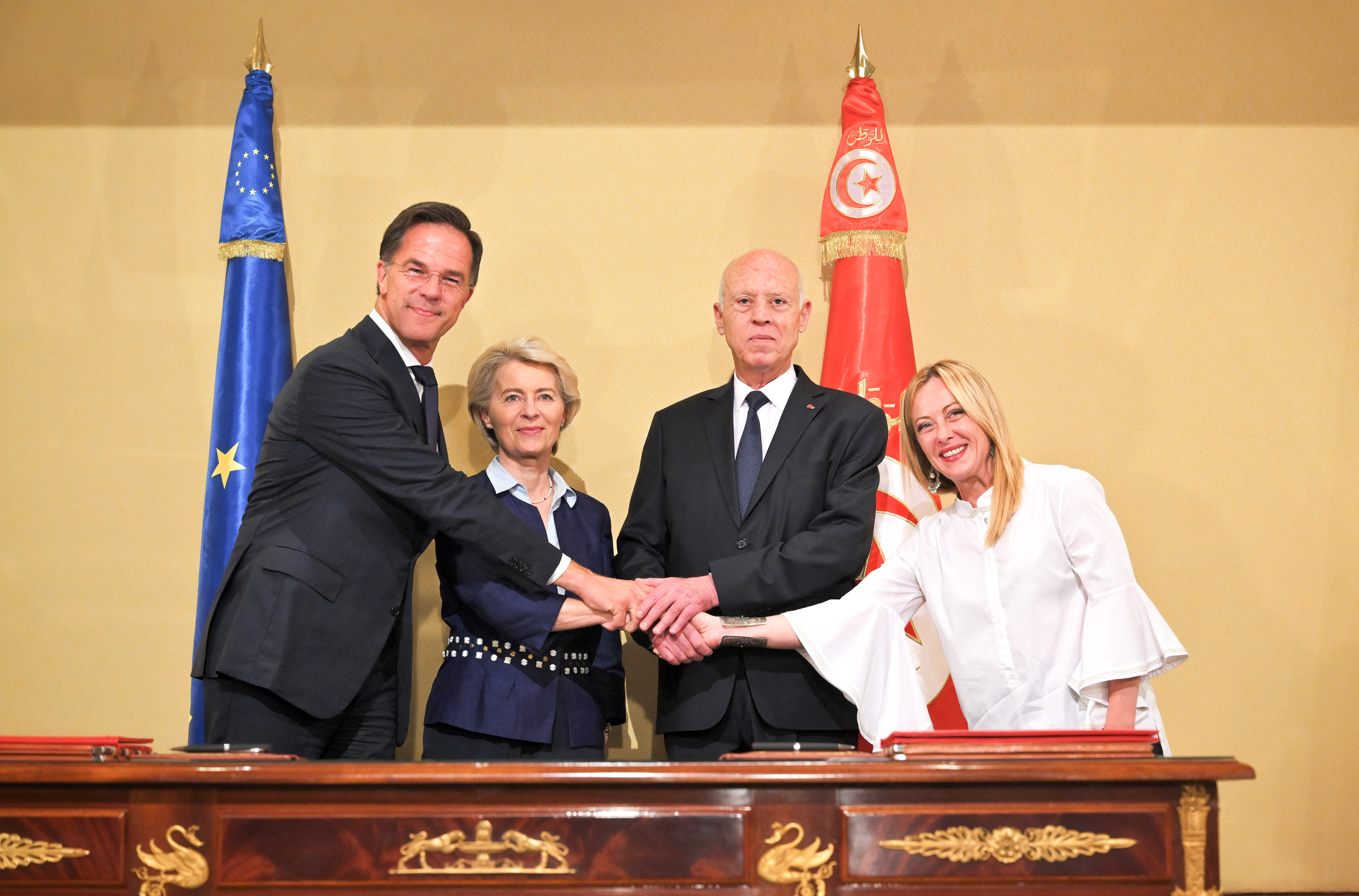
Meloni with Mark Rutte, Ursula von der Leyen, and Kais Saied signing Tunisian aid legislation and an agreement against illegal immigration

Meloni with Ethiopian prime minister Abiy Ahmed and other leaders at the International Conference on Development and Migration in Rome, 23 July 2023

Meloni has criticised Italy's approach towards illegal immigrants, calling for a zero-tolerance policy. She wants to block illegal immigrants from reaching Italian ports, and boost the birth rate of Italian nationals to ease the need for migrant labour. She is opposed to birthright citizenship proposals, which would give citizenship including education rights to foreigners born and living in Italy.

Amid the 2022 escalation of the Russo-Ukrainian War, Meloni said she supported giving refugee status to those coming from a war-shaken country but not to other asylum seekers. She said: "It's time to call things by their name, to give refugee status to those fleeing war, women, and children, perhaps doing the opposite with those who aren't refugees."

In August 2022, she reposted a pixelated video on Twitter that shows a woman being raped by an asylum seeker. The victim of the violence decried the publication of the video and said she was recognised by the video posted. After receiving backlash, Meloni defended herself by accusing other politicians of not having condemned the rape itself.

Meloni has blamed neo-colonialism for Africa's underdevelopment and the 2015 European migrant crisis, and she said she favours co-operation over what she termed France's neocolonialism. She has been considered as opposed to the reception of illegal immigrants, as well as to multiculturalism, and she has been described as xenophobic, as well as Islamophobic, by some critics.

In 2018, she said she would welcome Venezuelans, saying they are Christians and often of Italian origin. She has often criticised George Soros and what she terms globalists, at times reflecting the views of Soros conspiracy theories, once saying: "When you are a slave, you act in Soros's interests." She has endorsed the Great Replacement, a white nationalist conspiracy theory.

She believes there is a planned mass migration from Africa to Europe for the purpose of replacing and eliminating Italians, an antisemitic, far-right conspiracy theory known as the Kalergi Plan. She has described pro-immigration policies as part of an alleged left-wing conspiracy to "replace Italians with immigrants". In January 2017, she called immigration to Italy "ethnic substitution".

Meloni complained about the danger of ethnic substitution in her 2019 book about the Nigerian mafia, co-written with Alessandro Meluzzi, anti-vaccine psychiatrist, founder of the "Anti-Islamisation Party" and at the time primate of a schismatic Italian Orthodox Church. Along with other white supremacist stereotypes, the book argues that a project is underway to "change the European ethnicity and create Eurafrica", that the Nigerian mafia is the product of "local cultures that practice ritual murder and cannibalism", and that "the corpses of white people are very appreciated" by the Yoruba, who are said to be engaged in the trade of human flesh and organs.

In 2023, amidst an unprecedented migration crisis, she asserted that Europe and Italy need immigration and that only illegal immigration must be fought in favour of legal immigration. Meloni wanted to make a deal with Tunisian president Kais Saied with a focus on stopping illegal immigration from Tunisia to Europe. In September 2023, more than 120 boats carrying around 7,000 migrants from Africa arrived on the Italian island of Lampedusa within 24 hours, increasing the volume handled by the local migration reception centre by 15 times and leading to the migrants outnumbering the island's native population. Meloni declared that she wrote to the European Commission president Ursula von der Leyen "to ask her to come with me to Lampedusa to personally realise the gravity of the situation we face, and to immediately accelerate the implementation of the agreement with Tunisia by transferring the agreed resources".

In November 2023, Giorgia Meloni and Albanian Prime Minister Edi Rama signed an immigration agreement that allowed Italy, for at least five years, to make use of specified locations in Albania to establish two migrant management facilities, funded and placed under Italian jurisdiction. Building work started in March 2024, with the initial structures finished later that year. The port of Shëngjin hosts an arrival facility, and an asylum complex operates on a nearby military base close to the village of Gjadër.

The detention centre in Gjadër has been criticised by politicians and human rights observers for its lack of transparency, prison-like conditions, and serious risks to detainees' mental health, including reports of frequent self-harm, suicide attempts, and inadequate access to legal and medical safeguards. The asylum centre has room for 36,000 migrants, but by October 2025, only 256 have been detained there. In most cases, judicial decisions resulted in their return to Italy.

The Meloni government issued over 450,000 permits to migrants between 2023 and 2025. In July 2025, it was reported that the government will issue nearly half a million or 500,000, work visas for non-EU nationals from 2026 to 2028. The quotas are reserved for selected countries, primarily located in Asia, Africa, and the Western Balkans.

In 2025, the Meloni government enacted a decree which significantly restricted Italian citizenship by descent, affecting millions of Italian descendants. Citizenship claims are now restricted to applicants who have a parent or grandparent born in Italy who held Italian citizenship at birth. Great-grandchildren and more distant descendants no longer qualify automatically.

In July 2026, following the Morocco–Spain border incident, Meloni called for Spain to be suspended from the EU's visa-free Schengen Area. Writing on X, she said that "uncontrolled illegal immigration poses a real threat to the security of Europe's borders." Domestically, her position was supported by members of her governing coalition, including Deputy Prime Minister Matteo Salvini. Spanish Prime Minister Pedro Sánchez rejected Meloni's criticism and argued on X that Italy had received significantly more migrant arrivals than Spain since 2021, citing approximately 478,000 arrivals in Italy compared with 234,000 in Spain.

=== Foreign issues ===
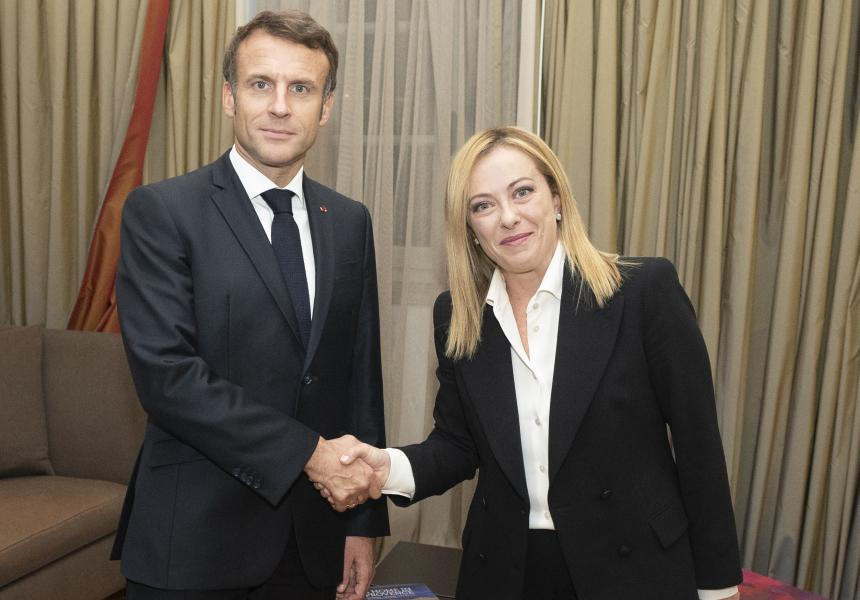
Meloni with French president Emmanuel Macron in 2022

Meloni followed the PdL party line in favour of the 2011 military intervention in Libya; however, in 2019, she criticised the French rationale for the intervention, stating it was because of Muammar Gaddafi's opposition to the CFA franc. She was critical of Italian relations with Saudi Arabia and Qatar, stating that these countries "systematically and deliberately spread fundamentalist theories that are the main causes of the growth of Islamic fundamentalism".

She opposed the decision to host the Supercoppa Italiana final in Saudi Arabia, and stated that Italy should actively raise the issue of human rights in Saudi Arabia. However, upon taking office, Meloni reversed her position, with her government stating it was "keen to maintain the excellent relationship with Saudi Arabia" yet still calling for a "firm reaction" against Qatar to which several Italians were accused of involvement in Qatargate.

In 2021, Meloni stated her party "denounced the authoritarian, Islamist direction Erdogan's Turkey has taken for years and asked the EU to withdraw Ankara's status as a candidate country", but upon taking office, pursued closer ties with the Turkish government, due to Italy's interests in Libya, cooperation in stopping illegal immigration, shared nationalist values and common disagreement with French foreign policy. Meloni advocated for the expulsion of the Indian ambassador to Italy as a result of the Enrica Lexie case, and she urged Alessandro Del Piero to refuse to play in the Indian Super League until the detained Italian marines were returned. Following the Asia Bibi blasphemy case, Meloni criticised what she called the "silence of the West" and advocated a stronger stance by the international community against human rights violations in Pakistan.

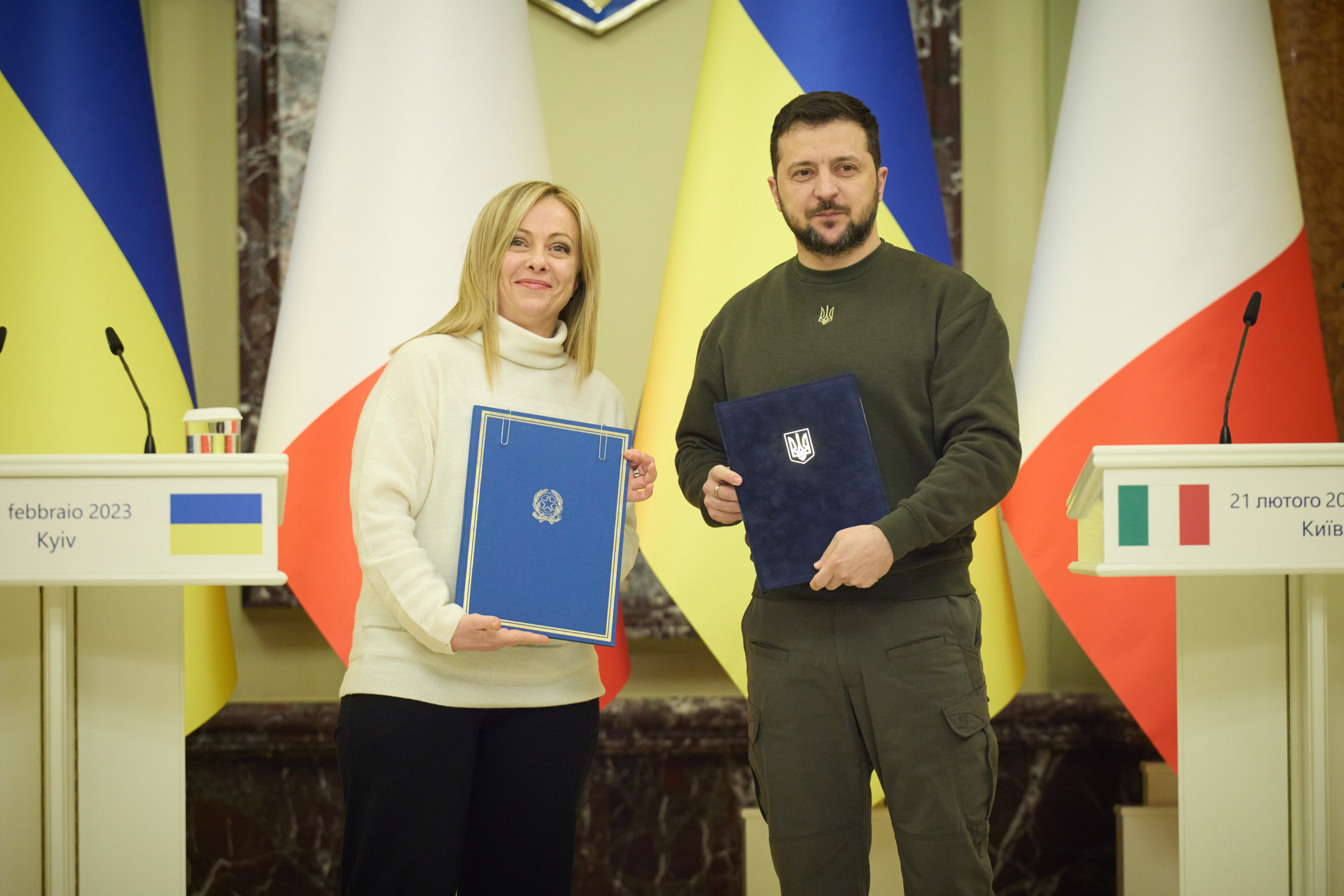
Meloni with Ukrainian president Volodymyr Zelenskyy in 2023

Prior to the 2022 Russian invasion of Ukraine, she was in favour of better relations with Russia and supported lifting sanctions on Russia in 2014. In 2018, she congratulated Vladimir Putin for his re-election as president. In 2021, she wrote that Russia under Putin defends European values and Christian identity. Since the 2022 invasion, she has pledged to send arms to Ukraine and moved towards Atlanticism. In September 2022, she said that Russia's annexation of four partially occupied provinces in southeastern Ukraine has "no legal and political value".

She is supportive of NATO, although she maintains Eurosceptic views towards the EU, having also previously advocated a withdrawal from the eurozone. She rejects the Eurosceptic label, favouring the Eurorealism of a confederal Europe of sovereign nations. Following the start of Trump's second term, Meloni has been noted for her efforts to preserve the transatlantic alliance leveraging her relationship with Trump and credited for orchestrating a rapprochement between Trump and Ukrainian president Zelenskyy at the 2025 funeral of Pope Francis.

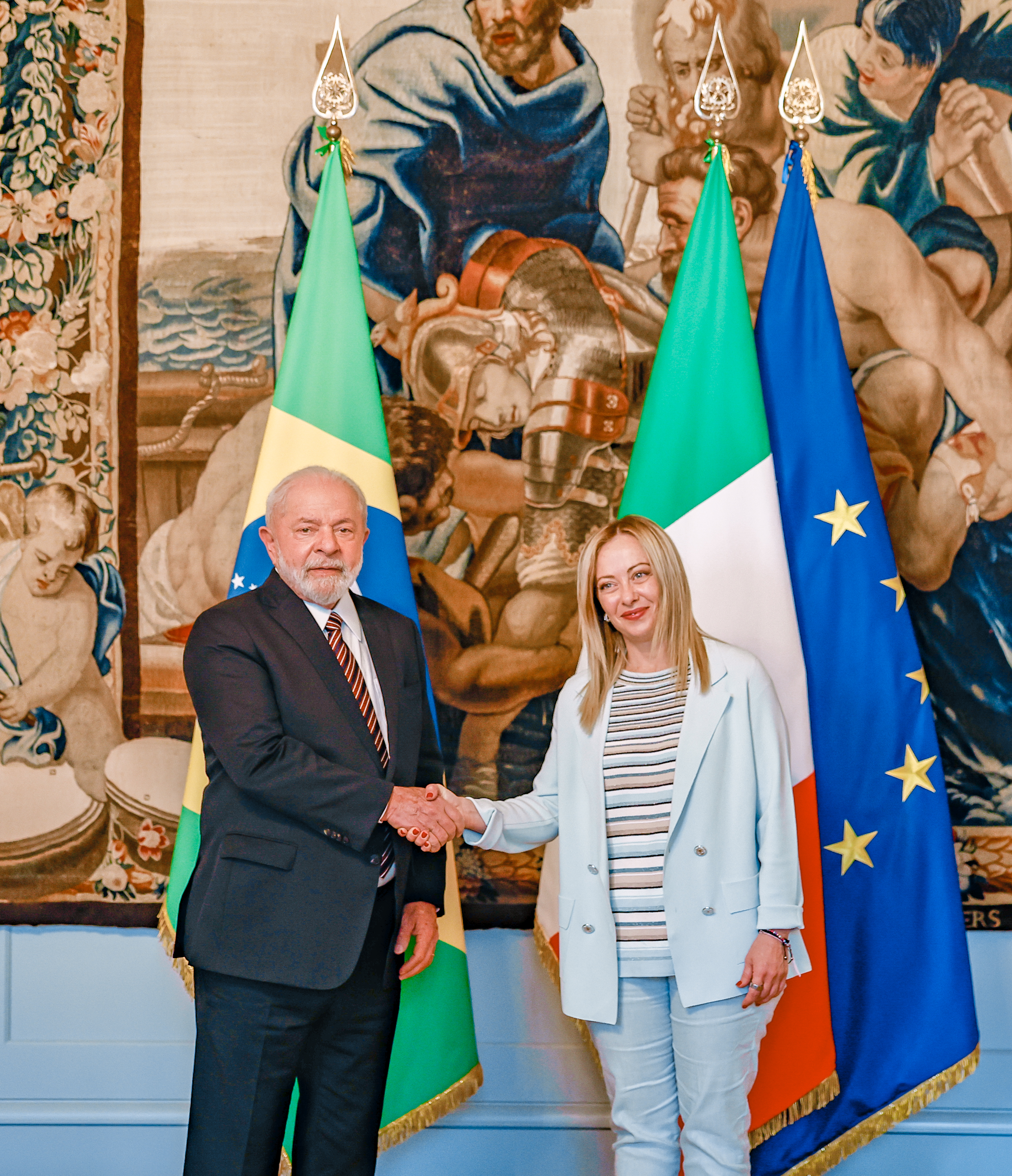
Meloni with Brazilian president Luiz Inácio Lula da Silva in 2023

A critic of China, Meloni is a supporter of closer ties between Italy and Taiwan. She is a controversial figure in Croatia due to her Italian irredentist statements in which she claimed Dalmatia and Istria, and for being opposed to Croatian entry into the EU due to the unresolved dispute concerning properties of exiled Italians after World War II from these two Croatian regions.

In 2018, she said that Iran and Lebanese militant group Hezbollah were protectors of Syrian Christians in the Syrian civil war. She condemned "another massacre of children in Gaza" during the 2014 Gaza War between Israel and the Palestinian militant group Hamas, but later changed her stance and became a supporter of closer relations with Israel. Unlike Matteo Salvini, she is opposed to moving the Italian embassy to Israel from Tel Aviv to Jerusalem, opposed the Rafah offensive during the ongoing Gaza war, and is supportive of a two-state solution. After the 2023 Israeli invasion of Gaza, she reversed her pro-Israel stance and imposed a full arms embargo on Israel.

Meloni has not apologised to African nations for wrongs committed during the Italian colonial period, but is vocally critical of the legacy of the French colonial empire in Africa, arguing that France continues to exploit its former colonies through the CFA franc.

Though previously known to be on good terms with U.S. President Donald Trump, which even included her being the only European leader to attend his second inauguration in January 2025, Meloni and Trump came into conflict in April 2026 due to their disputes over both Trump's criticism of Pope Leo XIV, which included him posting on social media an AI image of him as a Jesus-like figure, and his handling of the 2026 Iran War, with Trump lashing out at Meloni and, among other things, calling her "much different than I thought."

=== Energy policy ===
In March 2026, Meloni called for an urgent suspension of the EU Emissions Trading System (ETS, which sets a limit on greenhouse gas emissions from key sectors, incentivising reductions through carbon pricing and trading of emission allowances), for electricity production, citing the need to lower soaring energy prices triggered by the crisis in the Middle East.

On 18 March 2026, Meloni and nine other EU member state leaders requested a review of the EU Emissions Trading System (ETS) in a joint letter to European authorities. In the letter, the heads of state and government called for an extension of free emissions allowances beyond 2034, along with a more gradual phase-out of free quotas starting in 2028, citing the need to support European industry.

Her stance on global warming has been called (by Politico) "a delicate tightrope", as her movement has traditionally criticised concern over global warming as "elitist and against the people", and she herself has denounced "ultra-ecological fanaticism" as a threat to the economy. At the same time extreme heat during the summer of 2022 is estimated to have killed 18,000 Italians, and a February March 2023 Eurobarometer poll found 75% of Italians thought her government "hasn't done enough" to counter climate-related phenomena.

=== COVID-19 pandemic and vaccines ===
Meloni has exhibited support for vaccine hesitancy, such as not vaccinating her daughter during the COVID-19 pandemic in Italy because "it's not a religion". She has been criticised due to her statements on vaccines and COVID-19, stating the probability of someone aged 0–19 dying from COVID-19 was the same as being struck by lightning. After her party won the 2022 Italian general election, they pledged to review the positions taken by the Italian government during the COVID-19 pandemic and end the COVID-19 vaccine mandate in place for health care workers.

=== Relationship with fascism ===
During her political career, Meloni has made statements that generated controversy. In an interview to the French newscast Soir 3 when she was 19, she praised Italian dictator Benito Mussolini as "a good politician, in that everything he did, he did for Italy", and as the best politician of the last 50 years. In January 2020, there was some controversy after Meloni and the comune ('municipality') of Verona supported naming a street after Giorgio Almirante; Meloni and the comune also supported giving Liliana Segre, a Holocaust survivor and senator for life, honorary citizenship. Segre said that she and Almirante were incompatible and the comune had to make a choice.

In May 2020, Meloni praised Almirante as a "great politician", as well as "a patriot". He was the co-founder of the Italian Social Movement (MSI), who had a long post-war political career until retiring in 1987. During World War II, he was a wartime collaborator as a civil minister of the Italian Social Republic (RSI), a Nazi puppet state, as well as editor-in-chief of the antisemitic and racist magazine La Difesa della Razza, which published the "Manifesto of Race" in 1938.

As a minister in 2009, Meloni visited Yad Vashem in Israel. She has said as FdI party leader that her party "handed fascism over to history for decades now" and it "unambiguously condemns the suppression of democracy and the ignominious anti-Jewish laws".

In November 2018, Meloni declared that the celebration of the Liberation Day, also known as the Anniversary of Italy's Liberation from Nazi-Fascism on 25 April, and Festa della Repubblica, which celebrates the birth of the Italian Republic on 2 June, should be substituted with the National Unity and Armed Forces Day on 4 November, which commemorates Italy's victory in World War I. She said that Liberation Day and Festa della Repubblica are "two controversial celebrations". Meloni has tried to distance herself from her ties to Roberto Jonghi Lavarini, a Milanese politician and entrepreneur known as the "Black Baron".

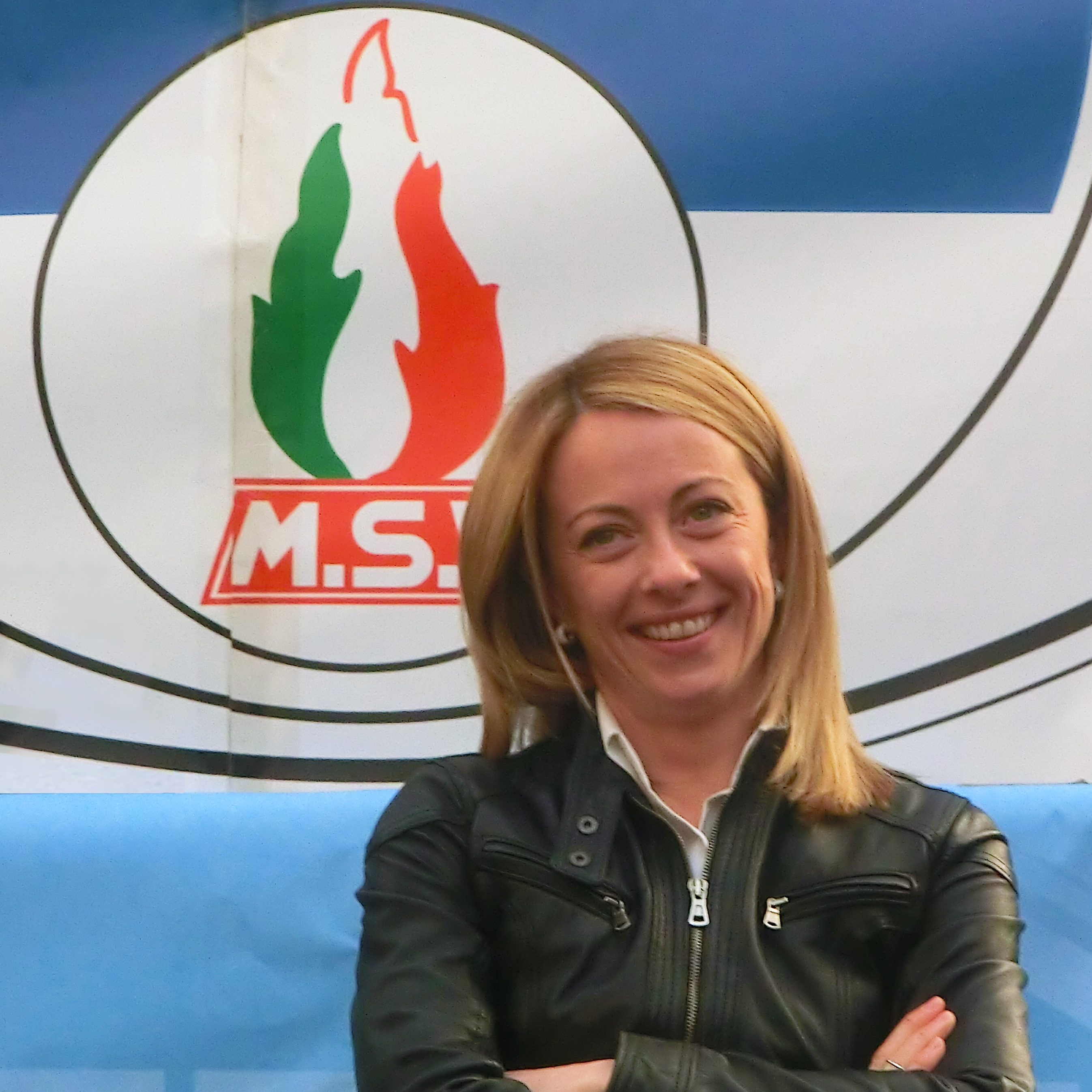
Meloni with the tricolour flame in the background, 2014

After the formation of FdI in 2012, she decided to add the tricolour flame to the party flag, a neo-fascist symbol associated with the MSI, which derived its name and ideals from the RSI. The tricolour flame is said to represent Mussolini's remains, where a flame is always burning on his tomb in Predappio. Heading into the 2022 general election, Segre told Pagine Ebraiche that Meloni should remove the tricolour flame from the party's logo. FdI's co-founder Ignazio La Russa rejected this view, and Meloni ignored the request, keeping the tricolour flame.

Observers, including historians Ruth Ben-Ghiat, David Broder, and Laurence Bertrand Dorléac, said that Meloni and FdI have been ambiguous about their fascist past, at times rejecting it and at other times minimising it, and that this has helped to rebrand both herself and her party. Responding to the 2021 Fanpage.it report, she minimised the investigation and refused to remove openly neo-fascist members of FdI.

In December 2021, FdI's Alfredo Catapano and Luigi Rispoli were among former MSI members who did a Roman salute, which was condemned by the ANPI. Rispoli told Fanpage.it: "I believe in the New Right and in the efforts Giorgia Meloni is making in Brothers of Italy. It makes me wonder, frankly, this clamour." Shortly before the 2022 general election, she sacked a member that openly praised Adolf Hitler. FdI had also distanced itself from the Ascoli Piceno party section after it celebrated the anniversary of the March on Rome in 2019.

On 25 October 2022, on the occasion of the vote of confidence of the Parliament in the government, Meloni in her speech before the deputies said: "Freedom and democracy are the distinctive elements of contemporary European civilisation in which I have always recognised myself. And therefore, despite the instrumental argument of my opponents, I have never had sympathy for undemocratic regimes. For any regime, including fascism. Exactly as I have always considered the racial laws of 1938 the lowest point in Italian history, a shame that will mark our people forever."

In July 2024, Meloni was awarded damages in a defamation lawsuit against journalist Giulia Cortese, who in October 2021 had posted a photo of Meloni on Twitter, now X, which was altered to show Mussolini in the background. Cortese later mocked Meloni's height, stating, "You don't scare me, Giorgia Meloni. After all, you're only 1.2 metres (4 ft) tall. I can't even see you." Cortese was not charged for posting the photo comparing Meloni to Mussolini, but was fined for comments about Meloni's height that were deemed "body shaming". Cortese criticised the judgment in a post on X, stating, "Italy's government has a serious problem with freedom of expression and journalistic dissent."

== Personal life ==
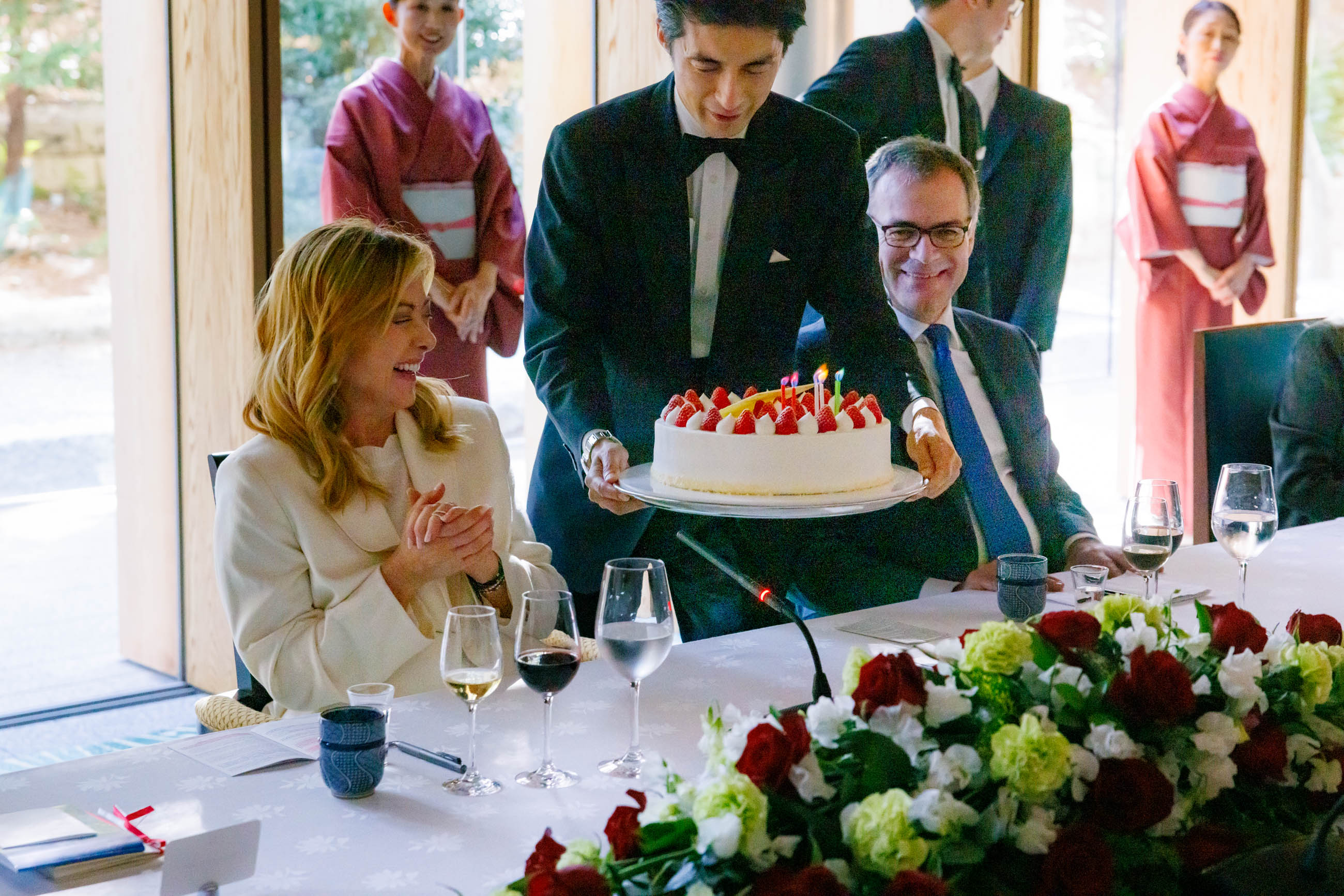
Meloni receives a birthday cake for her forty-ninth birthday, during her official visit to Japan in January 2026.

In 2015, Meloni began a relationship with Andrea Giambruno, a journalist working for Mediaset TV channels. The couple have a daughter, Ginevra, born in September 2016. On 20 October 2023, she announced her split with Giambruno, following his off-air statements transmitted by the television program Striscia la notizia that were described as "sexist" and "chauvinist", which included propositioning a female colleague for a threesome. Meloni added that "all those who hoped to weaken [her] by attacking [her] personal life should know that however much the drop of water tries to dig out the stone, the stone remains stone and the drop is only water". She defended herself, not being married to her child's father.

Meloni is a Catholic and has used her religious identity in part to help build her national brand. In a 2019 speech to a rally in Rome, she said: "I am Giorgia. I am a woman, I am a mother, I am Italian, I am Christian."

In September 2022, Meloni reportedly continued to embrace the trinomial "Dio, patria, famiglia" ('God, fatherland, family'). She has said she resents being linked to Italy's fascist past.

In addition to her native Italian, Meloni speaks English, Spanish, and French.

Meloni is a fan of fantasy, particularly J. R. R. Tolkien's The Lord of the Rings. As a youth activist with the Italian Social Movement (MSI), she attended the 1993 revival of the Camp Hobbit festival ("Hobbit 93") and sang along with the folk band Compagnia dell'Anello, named after The Fellowship of the Ring (1954). Later, she named her political conference Atreyu, after the hero of the novel The Neverending Story (1979). Meloni told The New York Times: "I think that Tolkien could say better than we can what conservatives believe in."

In November 2023, Meloni inaugurated a major exhibition on J. R. R. Tolkien at the National Gallery of Modern and Contemporary Art in Rome to mark the 50th anniversary of the author's death. Apart from Tolkien, she is fond of British conservative philosopher Roger Scruton and has said: "If I were British I would be a Tory."

== Honours and recognition ==
Forbes ranked Meloni as the seventh most powerful woman in the world in 2022 and placed her third in 2023 and 2024. In 2024 she was named one of the 100 most influential people in the world by Time magazine. That same year, Meloni also received the Atlantic Council's Global Citizen Award. Politico Europe ranked her as Europe's Most Powerful Person in their Class of 2025.

=== Foreign honours ===
- Finland: Grand Cross of the Order of the White Rose of Finland (2023)
- Spain: Dame Grand Cross of the Order of Isabella the Catholic (2024)
- Ukraine: Member of the Order of Liberty (2024)

=== International honours ===
- IOC: Gold Olympic Order (2026)

== Electoral history ==
Meloni has been a member of Parliament since 2006, being most recently re-elected in 2022.

Election	House	Constituency	Party	Votes	Result
2006	Chamber of Deputies	Lazio 1	AN	– (Note: She was elected in a closed list proportional representation system)	Elected
2008	Chamber of Deputies	Lazio 2	PdL	–	Elected
2013	Chamber of Deputies	Lombardy 3	FdI	–	Elected
2014	European Parliament	Central Italy	FdI	99,143	Not elected
2018	Chamber of Deputies	Lazio 2 – Latina	FdI	70,268	Elected
2019	European Parliament	Central Italy	FdI	130,159	Elected (Note: Meloni renounced her seat to remain a member of the Chamber of Deputies)
2022	Chamber of Deputies	Abruzzo – L'Aquila	FdI	104,823	Elected
2024	European Parliament	Central Italy	FdI	611,847	Elected

=== First-past-the-post elections ===
Meloni won first-past-the-post elections for a parliamentary seat in both 2018 and 2022.

2018 general election (C): Latina
Candidate	Coalition	Votes	%
Giorgia Meloni	Centre-right coalition	70,268	41.0
Leone Martellucci	Five Star Movement	62,563	36.5
Federico Fauttilli	Centre-left coalition	26,293	15.3
Others		12,269	7.2
Total		171,393	100.0

2022 general election (C): L'Aquila
Candidate	Coalition	Votes	%
Giorgia Meloni	Centre-right coalition	104,823	51.5
Rita Innocenzi	Centre-left coalition	42,630	20.9
Attilio D'Andrea	Five Star Movement	33,132	16.3
Others		22,998	11.3
Total		203,583	100.0

=== Municipal elections ===
Meloni lost the municipal election to become mayor of Rome in 2016.

2016 municipal election: Rome
Candidate	Coalition	Votes	%	Votes	%
Virginia Raggi	Five Star Movement	461,190	35.3	770,564	67.2
Roberto Giachetti	Centre-left coalition	325,835	24.9	376,935	32.8
Giorgia Meloni	Centre-right coalition	269,760	20.6		
Others		251,160	19.2		
Total		1,307,945	100.0	1,147,499	100.0

== Bibliography ==
- Meloni, Giorgia (2011). Podda, Stefano (ed.). Noi crediamo [We Believe]. Saggi (in Italian). Milan: it:Sperling & Kupfer. ISBN 978-8-8200-4932-4. OCLC 898518765 – via Google Books.
- Meloni, Giorgia; Meluzzi, Alessandro; Mercurio, Valentina (2019). Mafia nigeriana. Origini, rituali, crimini [Nigerian Mafia: Origins, Rituals, Crimes]. I saggi (in Italian). Mantova: Oligo Editore. ISBN 978-8-8857-2325-2 – via Google Books.
- Meloni, Giorgia (2021). Io sono Giorgia, le mie radici, le mie idee [I Am Giorgia, My Roots, My Ideas]. Saggi (in Italian). Rome: Rizzoli. ISBN 978-8-8171-5468-0 – via Google Books.

== See also ==
- List of current heads of state and government
- List of heads of the executive by approval rating

Party political offices
Preceded by Ignazio La Russa	President of Brothers of Italy; 2014–present	Incumbent
Preceded by Jan Zahradil	President of the European Conservatives and Reformists Party; 2020–2025	Succeeded by Mateusz Morawiecki
Political offices
Preceded by Giovanna Melandri	Minister of Youth; 2008–2011	Succeeded by Andrea Riccardi
Preceded by Mario Draghi	Prime Minister of Italy; 2022–present	Incumbent
Diplomatic posts
Preceded by Fumio Kishida	Chair of the Group of Seven; 2024	Succeeded by Mark Carney
Order of precedence
Preceded by Lorenzo Fontana as President of the Chamber of Deputies	Order of precedence of Italy; Prime Minister	Succeeded by Augusto Antonio Barbera as President of the Constitutional Court
