= Legislature XIX of Italy =

Legislature XIX of Italy XIX legislatura della Repubblica Italiana
- 19th legislature

Type
- Type: Bicameral
- Houses: Chamber of Deputies; Senate of the Republic

History
- Founded: 13 October 2022
- Preceded by: XVIII Legislature

Leadership
- President of the Senate: Ignazio La Russa, FdI since 13 October 2022
- President of the Chamber of Deputies: Lorenzo Fontana, LSP since 14 October 2022

Structure
- Seats: C: 400; S: 205 (200 + 5)
- Chamber of Deputies political groups: Non-voting President (1): Lega (1); Government (222): FdI (117) (Note: FdI (116); DCR (1)); Lega (53) (Note: Lega (53) (Note: LCD (1))); FI–PPE (52); Supported by (13): NM–MAIE–CP (8); Mixed (5) (Note: ScN (3) (Note: FdI (2); ScN (1)); Non-iscrits (2) (Note: UdC (1); Ind. (1))); Opposition (162): PD–IDP (68) (Note: PD (67); DemoS (1)); M5S (48); AZ–PER–RE (10); AVS (10); IV–CR (7); Mixed (19) (Note: FN (9); Linguistic minorities (4) (Note: SVP (3); UV (1)); +E (3); Non-Inscrits (3) (Note: CD (1); PLD (1); Ind. (1))); Vacant (2)
- Senate of the Republic political groups: Non-voting President (1): FdI (1); Government (111): FdI (62); LSP–PSd'Az (29) (Note: Lega (29)); FI–BP–PPE (20); Supported by (8): CdI (7) (Note: NM (3) (Note: MAIE (1)); FdI (2); CI (1); UdC (1)); Mixed (1); Opposition (85): PD–IDP (35) (Note: PD (34); CpE (1)); M5S (25); IV–CR (8); Aut. (SVP-PATT, CB) (7) (Note: SVP (2); Senators for life (2); Campobase (1); PD (1); Greens (1)); Mixed (10) (Note: AVS (3) (Note: SI (2); Ind. (1)); Senators for life (3); AZ–RE (2); A–PSI–PrCivIt (1) (Note: M5S (1)); PRC–SE–OS (1))

Elections
- Chamber of Deputies voting system: Rosatellum
- Senate of the Republic voting system: Rosatellum
- Last general election: 25 September 2022
- Next general election: No later than 22 October 2027

Meeting place
- Palazzo Montecitorio, Rome (C)
- Palazzo Madama, Rome (S)

Constitution
- Constitution of Italy

Footnotes
- Notes

The Legislature XIX of Italian Republic (Italian: XIX Legislatura della Repubblica Italiana) is the 19th and current Italian Parliament, which was elected at the 2022 general election on 25 September and convened on 12 October. As per the 2020 Italian constitutional referendum, the size of the Chamber of Deputies was reduced from 630 to 400, and the Senate's elective membership was reduced from 315 to 200 (for a total of 205 senators, including appointed life senators).

The largest party in both chambers is Brothers of Italy, led by Prime Minister Giorgia Meloni. The centre-right coalition supporting the Meloni government controls a majority in both chambers.

== Government ==
Prime Minister	Party	Term of office		Government	Composition
Prime Minister	Party	Took office	Left office	Government	Composition
Giorgia Meloni (b. 1977)	Brothers of Italy	22 October 2022	Incumbent	Meloni	FdI • Lega • FI (Centre-right coalition)

== Current composition ==
=== Chamber of Deputies ===
- President: Lorenzo Fontana (LSP), elected on 14 October 2022
- Vice Presidents: Anna Ascani (PD), Sergio Costa (M5S), Giorgio Mulè (FI), Fabio Rampelli (FdI)

Parliamentary groups in the Chamber of Deputies
Initial composition		Current composition			
Parliamentary group	Seats	Parliamentary group	Seats	Change	Notes
Brothers of Italy	118	Brothers of Italy	117	▼1	
Democratic Party – Democratic and Progressive Italy	69	Democratic Party – Democratic and Progressive Italy	70	▲1	(Note: On 23 April 2024, deputy Eleonora Evi left the AVS group and joined the Democrats.)
League – Salvini for Premier	66	League – Salvini for Premier	57	▼9	
Five Star Movement	52	Five Star Movement	49	▼3	(Note: On 4 September 2024, deputy Giorgio Lovecchio left M5S and joined FI.) (Note: On 1 February 2024, deputy Federica Onori left M5S and joined Action.) (Note: On 12 April 2025, the M5S's Anna Laura Orrico in the single-member constituency Calabria – 02 was unseated and her seat reassigned to FI's Andrea Gentile, who successfully appealed his initial defeat; Orrico was proclaimed re-elected in the multi-member constituency Calabria – 01 to replace her partymate Elisa Scutellà, who ceased to hold office.)
Forza Italia – Berlusconi for President – EPP	44	Forza Italia – Berlusconi for President – EPP	52	▲8	(Note: On 21 March 2025, deputy Davide Bellomo left the League to join FI.) (Note: On 14 May 2024, deputy Giuseppe Castiglione left Action and joined FI.) (Note: On 16 September 2024, deputy Enrico Costa left Action and joined FI.) (Note: On 30 September 2024, deputy Isabella De Monte left IV and joined FI.) (Note: On 18 July 2025, Minardo left the Non-Inscrits subgroup and joined FI.) (Note: On 16 September 2025, deputy Giuseppe Bicchielli left Us Moderates and joined FI.) (Note: On 20 January 2026, Bergamini and Pierro left the Mixed group to join FI.) (Note: On 6 June 2026, Davide Bergamini and Attilio Pierro left Forza Italia and joined the National Future, moving to the Mixed group.)
Action – Italy Alive – Renew Europe	21	Action – Renew Europe	10	▼11	
Action – Italy Alive – Renew Europe	21	Greens and Left Alliance	10	▼2	(Note: On 27 October 2022, the Greens and Left Alliance component of the Mixed group became an official group.) (Note: On 9 January 2023, deputy Aboubakar Soumahoro left the AVS group.)
Action – Italy Alive – Renew Europe	21	Italy Alive – Renew Europe	6	▼15	
Action – Italy Alive – Renew Europe	21	Us Moderates (Coraggio Italia, UdC) – MAIE	8	▲8	
Mixed	30	Mixed	20	▼10	
Linguistic minorities	4	Linguistic minorities	4	Steady	(Note: On 26 October 2022, deputy Dieter Steger joined the Linguistic Minorities subgroup of the Mixed group.)
+Europe	3	+Europe	3	Steady	
Greens and Left Alliance	12	National Future	8	▲8	(Note: On 6 February 2026, the National Future was registered as a new party.) (Note: On 19 May 2026, Laura Ravetto abandoned Lega to join National Future.) (Note: On 6 June 2026, Domenico Furgiuele and Gianangelo Bof left the League group and joined the National Future, moving to the Mixed group.)
Us Moderates (Coraggio Italia, UdC) – MAIE	9				
Us Moderates (Coraggio Italia, UdC) – MAIE	9	UdC	1	▼8	(Note: On 18 April 2024, deputy Lorenzo Cesa left the NM group and joined the Mixed group.)
Non-inscrits	2	Non-inscrits	4	▲2	
Total seats	400	Total seats	400	Steady	

=== Senate of the Republic ===
- President: Ignazio La Russa (FdI), elected on 13 October 2022
- Vice Presidents: Maria Domenica Castellone (M5S), Gian Marco Centinaio (LSP), Licia Ronzulli (FI), Anna Rossomando (PD)

Parliamentary groups in the Senate of the Republic
Initial composition		Current composition			
Parliamentary group	Seats	Parliamentary group	Seats	Change	Notes
Brothers of Italy	63	Brothers of Italy	63	Steady	
Democratic Party – Democratic and Progressive Italy	38	Democratic Party – Democratic and Progressive Italy	36	▼2	(Note: On 3 March 2023, senator Bruno Astorre died. He was found dead in one of the Senate offices. On 21 March, Filippo Sensi replaced him.) (Note: On 26 April 2023, senator Enrico Borghi left the Democratic group and joined the A–IV group.) (Note: On 7 March 2025, senator Annamaria Furlan left the Democratic group and joined IV.)
League Salvini for Premier – Sardinian Action Party	29	League Salvini for Premier – Sardinian Action Party	29	Steady	
Five Star Movement	28	Five Star Movement	26	▼2	(Note: On 8 February 2024, senator Raffaele De Rosa left M5S.) (Note: On 6 August 2024, senator Antonio Salvatore Trevisi left M5S.)
Forza Italia – Berlusconi for President – EPP	18	Forza Italia – Berlusconi for President – EPP	20	▲2	(Note: On 12 June 2023, senator Silvio Berlusconi died. He was replaced by Adriano Galliani in October.) (Note: On 21 February 2024, De Rosa joined FI.) (Note: On 7 August 2024, Trevisi joined FI.)
Action – Italy Alive – Renew Europe	9	Italy Alive – Renew Europe	8	▼1	(Note: On 5 October 2023, senator Dafne Musolino left ScN and the Aut. group and joined the A–IV group.) (Note: On 8 November 2023, senators Carlo Calenda, Mariastella Gelmini, Marco Lombardo and Giusy Versace left the A–IV group and joined the Mixed group. On 9 November, A–IV split into two groups.)
For the Autonomies (SVP–PATT, Campobase, South calls North)	7	For the Autonomies (SVP–PATT, Campobase)	7	Steady	(Note: On 9 November 2022, senator for life Carlo Rubbia joined the Aut. group. On 22 September 2023, Giorgio Napolitano died.) (Note: On 19 February 2025, senator Aurora Floridia left the Greens and Left Alliance (AVS) subgroup and joined the Aut. group.)
Civics of Italy – Us Moderates (UdC – Coraggio Italia – Us with Italy – Italy in the Centre) – MAIE	6	Civics of Italy – UdC – Us Moderates (Coraggio Italia) – MAIE	8	▲2	(Note: On 30 October 2024, Gelmini left the Non-Inscrits subgroup of the Mixed group and joined the NM group, followed by Versace on 27 November.)
Mixed	7	Mixed	8	▲1	
		Action – Renew Europe	2	▲2	(Note: On 9 November 2023, the Action subgroup of the Mixed group is formed, composed of Calenda, Gelmini, Lombardo and Versace.) (Note: On 17 September 2024, senators Mariastella Gelmini and Giusy Versace left the Azione group and joined the Non-Inscrits subgroup of the Mixed group.)
		Greens and Left Alliance	3	▲3	(Note: On 24 October 2022, the AVS subgroup of the Mixed group was formed, composed of senators Ilaria Cucchi, Peppe De Cristofaro, Aurora Floridia and Tino Magni.)
Non-inscrits	7	Non-inscrits	3	▼4	
Non-inscrit life senators	1	Non-inscrit life senators	0	▼1	
Total seats	206	Total seats	205	Steady	

== See also ==
- 2022 President of the Italian Senate election
- 2022 President of the Italian Chamber of Deputies election
- 2022 Italian government formation
