= Italian Parliament =

Bicameral legislature of Italy

Italian Parliament Parlamento italiano
- 19th legislature
- Emblems of the Senate of the Republic and the Chamber of Deputies

Type
- Type: Bicameral
- Houses: Senate of the Republic; Chamber of Deputies

Leadership
- President of the Senate: Ignazio La Russa (FdI) since 13 October 2022
- President of the Chamber of Deputies: Lorenzo Fontana (Lega) since 14 October 2022

Structure
- Seats: 605; 205 (Note: (200 elected + 5 senators for life)) (Senate of the Republic); 400 (Chamber of Deputies)
- Senate of the Republic political groups: Government (Meloni Cabinet) (112): FdI (63); LSP–PSd'Az (29) (Note: Lega (29)); FI–BP–PPE (20); Supported by (8): CdI (7) (Note: NM (3) (Note: MAIE (1)); FdI (2); CI (1); UdC (1)); Mixed (1); Opposition (85): PD–IDP (35) (Note: PD (34); CpE (1)); M5S (25); IV–CR (8); Aut. (SVP-PATT, CB) (7) (Note: SVP (2); Senators for life (2); Campobase (1); PD (1); Greens (1)); Mixed (10) (Note: AVS (3) (Note: SI (2); Ind. (1)); Senators for life (3); AZ–RE (2); A–PSI–PrCivIt (1) (Note: M5S (1)); PRC–SE–OS (1))
- Chamber of Deputies political groups: Government (Meloni Cabinet) (223): FdI (117) (Note: FdI (116); DCR (1)); Lega (54) (Note: Lega (54) (Note: LCD (1))); FI–PPE (52); Supported by (13): NM–MAIE–CP (8); Mixed (5) (Note: ScN (3) (Note: FdI (2); ScN (1)); Non-iscrits (2) (Note: UdC (1); Ind. (1))); Opposition (162): PD–IDP (68) (Note: PD (67); DemoS (1)); M5S (48); AZ–PER–RE (10); AVS (10); IV–CR (7); Mixed (19) (Note: FN (9); Linguistic minorities (4) (Note: SVP (3); UV (1)); +E (3); Non-Inscrits (3) (Note: CD (1); PLD (1); Ind. (1))); Vacant (2)

Elections
- Last Senate of the Republic election: 25 September 2022
- Last Chamber of Deputies election: 25 September 2022

Meeting place
- Chamber of Deputies: Palazzo Montecitorio; Senate of the Republic: Palazzo Madama

Website
- www.parlamento.it

Constitution
- Italian Constitution

The Italian Parliament (Italian: Parlamento italiano) is the national parliament of the Italian Republic. It is the representative body of Italian citizens and is the successor to the Parliament of the Kingdom of Sardinia (1848–1861), the Parliament of the Kingdom of Italy (1861–1943), the transitional National Council (1945–1946) and the Constituent Assembly (1946–1948). It is a bicameral legislature with 600 elected members and a small number of unelected members (senatori a vita). The Italian Parliament is composed of the Chamber of Deputies (with 400 members or deputati elected on a national basis), as well as the Senate of the Republic (with 200 members or senatori elected on a regional basis, plus a small number of senators for life or senatori a vita, either appointed by the President of the Republic or former Presidents themselves, ex officio).

The two Houses are independent from one another and never meet jointly except under circumstances specified by the Constitution of Italy. By the Constitution, the two houses of the Italian Parliament possess the same powers, unlike in most parliamentary systems. Perfect bicameralism has been codified in its current form since the adoption of the Albertine Statute, and resurged after the overthrow of the fascist dictatorship of the 1920s and 1930s. No distinction is made between deputies and senators, notwithstanding that a member of parliament cannot be at the same time both a senator and a deputy; regarding presidents and vice-presidents, the precedence is given to the older one.

== Composition of the Parliament ==
The number of deputies and senators was fixed by a constitutional amendment in 1963: in its original text, the Constitution provided for a variable number of Members of Parliament depending on the population. From 1963 to 2022, the Chamber of Deputies had 630 members, while the Senate had 315 elected members. Following the 2020 Italian constitutional referendum, the number of MPs in the Parliament has been reduced from 630 to 400 in the Chamber of Deputies and from 315 to 200 in the Senate. The proposed changes were approved, with 69.96% voting in favour. The reduction of the number of MPs came to fruition with the following Legislature XIX of Italy and it was a constitutional reform attended since the 1980s.

In addition to the 200 elected members, the Senate, as per article 59 of the Constitution of the Italian Republic, also comprises a small number of senators for life. These can be differentiated into:

1. former Presidents of the Republic (ex officio, unless renouncing), and
2. Italian citizens who are appointed senators for life by the President of the Republic (no more than five) "for outstanding merits in the social, scientific, artistic or literary field".

The voting age mandated for both houses is the age of majority: any Italian citizen who is eighteen or older can vote. But the two houses have a different age of candidacy: deputies are required to be twenty-five or older, while elected senators must be forty or older. No explicit age limit is required to be appointed senator for life (but Presidents of the Republic must be 50 or older).

== Functions of the Parliament ==
The main prerogative of Parliament is the exercise of the legislative power, that is the power to enact laws. For a bill to become law, it must receive the support of both houses independently in the same text. A bill is first introduced in one of the houses, amended, and then approved or rejected: if approved, it is passed to the other house, which can amend it before approving or rejecting it. If approved without amendments, the bill is then promulgated by the President of the Republic and becomes law. If approved with amendments, it goes back to the other house. The process continues until the bill is approved in the same text by both houses (in which case it becomes law after promulgation) or is rejected by one house.

The Council of Ministers, which is led by the President of the Council of Ministers and is the national executive of Italy, needs to have the confidence of both houses in order to exercise its power fully. It must receive a vote of confidence by both houses before being officially in power, and Parliament can cast a motion of no confidence at any moment, which forces the President of the Council of Ministers and his/her Cabinet to resign. The President of the Republic can dissolve one or both houses, and new elections are held if a new Prime Minister is unable to receive the support of both houses.

=== Legislative process ===
The process by which the Italian Parliament makes ordinary laws, the iter legis ordinario, is as follows:

proposal → inspection → review → approval (article by article and final) → promulgation → publication.

Proposals can be made by the Government, individual Members of Parliament (who must present their proposal to the Chamber that they are a member of), private citizens (who must present a proposal in the form of a draft law, approved by 50,000 voters), individual Regional Councils, and the National Council for Economics and Labour (CNEL).

Once a proposal is introduced in one of the two Houses, it is assigned to a parliamentary committee to carry out preliminary inspection of the proposal (taking advantage of advice of other committees, especially, the so-called "filter committees"). At this point, two different procedures can be taken.

In the "normal procedure", the committee holds a referral meeting, drafts a response and names a spokesperson to report this response, then leaves the responsibility for composing and approving the bill's text to the assembly. This must be completed in no more than four months for the Chamber of Deputies and two months for the Senate. Once the bill has come before one of the chambers, a general discussion takes place, followed by the review (with a vote) article by article, and finally a vote on the whole bill, which is normally an open ballot (secret ballots are possible for matters of individual conscience). If the bill passes the vote in one chamber then it passes to the other chamber of the parliament, where it must be voted through without any further changes. If the other chamber does make any modifications to the bill then the new version of the bill must be returned to the first chamber to approve these changes. If the bill repeats this process many times it is said to be "shuttling" or "dribbling." This procedure is obligatory for bills which concern constitutional and electoral matters, the delegation of legislative power, the authorisation of the ratification of international treaties, the approval of the budget.

In all other cases, the "special procedure" (also called the "decentralised legislative procedure") can be employed. In this case, the committee holds a drafting meeting (leaving only the final approval of the bill to the parliament), or a deliberative/legislative meeting (in which case the entire legislative process is carried out by the committee and the bill is not voted on by parliament at all). This procedure can be vetoed by the vote of one tenth of the members of the Chamber in which the bill was originally proposed, by a vote of one fifth of the members of the committee, or by the decision of the Government.

There are special procedures for the passage of laws granting emergency powers, the annual law incorporating EU law, annual financial laws (such as the budget), and the passage of laws under urgency.

Once the bill has been approved in the same form by both houses of Parliament, it is sent to the President of the Republic, who must promulgate it within one month or send it back to Parliament for renewed debate with a written justification. If after the renewed debate the bill is approved by Parliament again, the President of the Republic is constitutionally required to promulgate it. Once it has been promulgated, the law is published in the official gazette by the Ministry of Justice and enters into force after the vacatio legis (15 days unless otherwise specified).

=== Amendments to the Constitution and to constitutional laws ===
The rigidity of the Constitution is ensured by the special procedure required to amend it. With the same procedure, Parliament can adopt a constitutional law, which is a law with the same strength as the Constitution. This process is referred to as iter legis aggravato, that is, a strengthened legislative process ad hoc for the passing of a constitutional law.

Article 138 of the Constitution provides for the special procedure through which the Parliament can adopt constitutional laws (including laws to amend the Constitution), which is a variation of the ordinary legislative procedure. The ordinary procedure to adopt a law in Italy requires both Houses of Parliament to approve the bill in the same text, with a simple majority (i.e., the majority of votes cast). Constitutional laws start by following the same procedure; however, after having been approved for the first time, they need to be voted for by both Houses a second time, which can happen no sooner than three months after the first. In this second reading, no new amendments to the bill may be proposed: the bill must be either approved or rejected in its entirety.

The constitutional law needs to be approved by at least a majority of all MP's in each house (absolute majority) in its second reading. Depending on the results of this second vote, the constitutional law may then follow two different paths.

- If the bill is approved by a qualified majority of two-thirds of members in each house, it can be immediately promulgated by the President of the Republic and becomes law.
- If the bill is approved by a majority of members in each house, but not enough to reach the qualified majority of two-thirds, it does not immediately become law. Instead, it must first be published in the Official Gazette (the official journal where all Italian laws are published). Within three months after its publication, a constitutional referendum may be requested by either 500,000 voters, five regional councils, or one-fifth of the members of a house of parliament. If no constitutional referendum has been requested after the three months have elapsed, the bill can be promulgated and becomes law. If a referendum is held, the constitutional law will be confirmed and promulgated only provided a simple majority of the "Yes"'s is achieved (no structural quorum is needed); however, should there be more "No"'s than "Yes"'s, then the law will not be confirmed, and will consequently be abolished without entering into force at all.

Article 139 of the Constitution holds the "form of Republic" above amendment.

=== Reviewing and guiding the executive ===
In addition to its legislative functions, Parliament also reviews the actions of Government and provides it with political direction.

Parliament exercises its review function by means of questions and inquests. Questions consist of a written question directed to the Government, asking whether a certain claim is true, whether the Government is aware of it, and whether the Government is taking any action about it. The response can be given by the relevant Government minister, by the chairperson of the relevant ministry, or by an undersecretary. It may be given in writing or delivered to the parliament orally. The member who asked the question can respond to say whether or not the answer is satisfactory. In injunctions, a fact is noted with a request for the reasons for the conduct of the Government and its future intentions. The process is done by writing. If the member who filed the injunction is not satisfied with the response, they can present a motion to hold a debate in the Parliament.

The provision of political direction embodies the relationship of trust which is meant to exist between Parliament and the Government. It takes the form of confidence votes and votes of no confidence. These can be held concerning the entire Government or an individual minister. Other means of providing political direction include motions, resolutions, and day-orders giving instruction to the Government.

=== Inquests ===
Under Article 82 of the Constitution, "each chamber can undertake inquests into matters of public interest. For this purpose, they should appoint a committee formed so that it conforms to the proportions of the various parliamentary groups." In order to fulfill its function as the ordinary organ through which popular sovereignty is exercised, Parliament can employ the same investigative and coercive instruments as the judiciary in these inquests.

=== Joint sessions ===
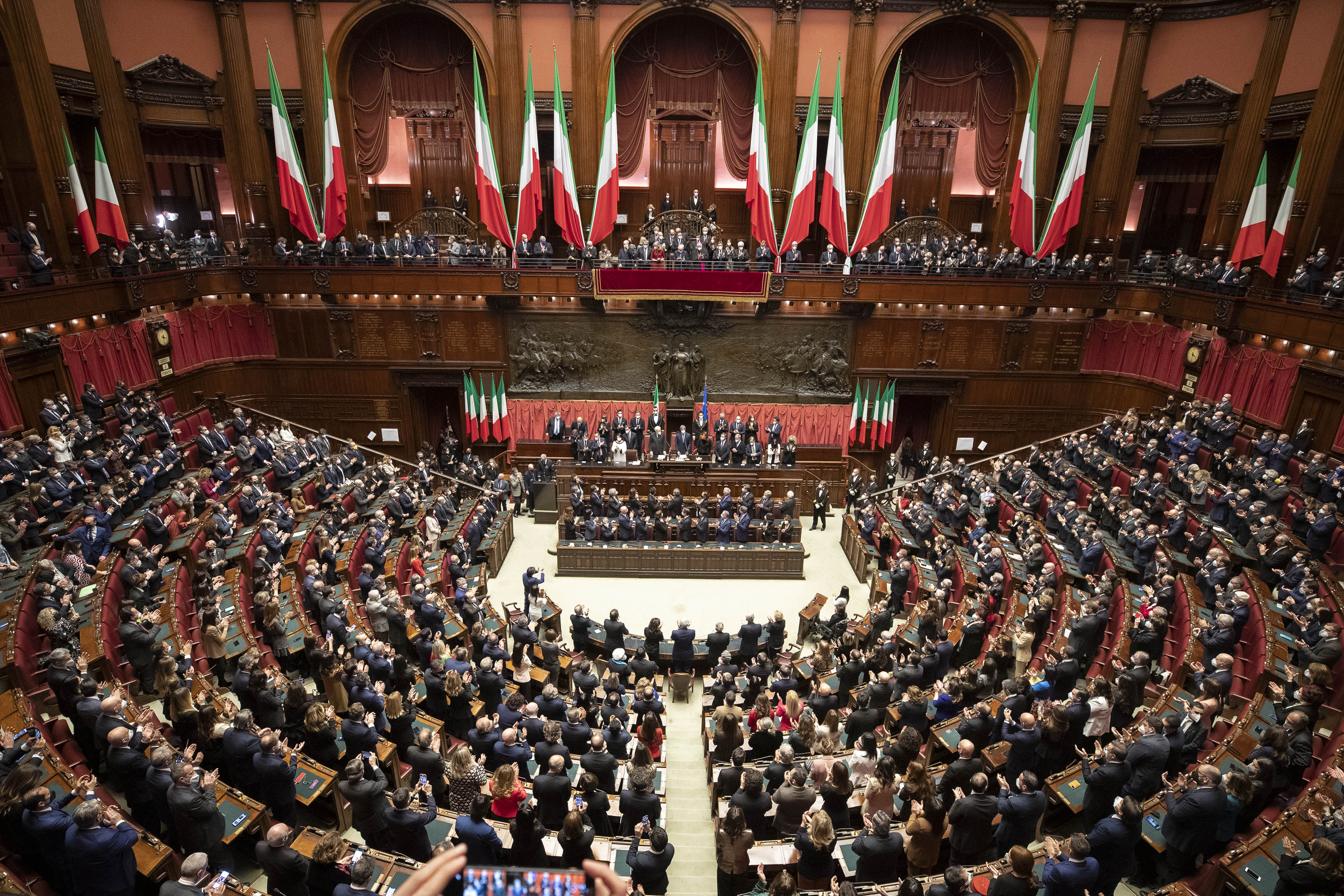
The Italian parliament in joint session for the inauguration of President Sergio Mattarella (3 February 2022)

The Parliament meets and votes in joint session (Italian: Parlamento in seduta comune) for a set of functions explicitly established by the Constitution. Article 55.2 specifies that these functions are entrenched and cannot be altered.

Joint sessions take place in the building of the Chamber of Deputies at Palazzo Montecitorio and are presided over by the President of the Chamber of Deputies ex officio. In this way, the drafters of the Constitution intended to establish an equilibrium with the power of the President of the Senate to exercise the functions of the President of the Republic when the latter is indisposed.

Joint sessions take place for the following matters explicitly established by the Constitution:

- to elect the President of the Republic (in this case, 58 regional delegates are added to the assembly). For the first three votes, a two-thirds majority is required to elect the president. If these fail, subsequent votes only require an absolute majority.
- to receive the President of the Republic's oath of office on election.
- to vote on the impeachment of the President of the Republic (more than an actual impeachment, it is an accusation of "high treason or attack to the Constitution"; this has never happened). This requires an absolute majority.
- to elect one third of the elected members of the High Council of the Judiciary. For the first two votes, election requires a three-fifths majority of the delegates; subsequent votes require a three-fifths majority of voting members (i.e. excluding abstentions).
- to elect five of the fifteen judges of the Constitutional Court. The first three votes require a two-thirds majority; subsequent votes require only a three-fifths majority.
- to vote on the list of 45 citizens from which sixteen lay members of the Constitutional Court are to be drawn in case of impeachment against the President of the Republic. The same voting system is used as for the election of the judges of the Constitutional Court.

There is debate among legal scholars about whether the Parliament in joint session can make its own standing orders. Most scholars think it can, by analogy with the regulation of the Senate in article 65, which explicitly foresees such action.

== Prerogatives ==
The Chambers of the Italian Parliament enjoy special prerogatives to guarantee their autonomy with respect to other parts of Government:

- Regulatory autonomy: the chambers regulate and approve the regulations which govern their internal affairs autonomously.
- Financial autonomy: the chambers decide autonomously the amount of resources they require for carrying out their functions. The Court of Audit has no jurisdiction over this.
- Administrative autonomy: Each chamber is in charge of the organisation of its own administrative facilities and the employment of its own officials (exclusively through a national public competition).
- Inviolability of the site: law enforcement officials can enter the parliament buildings only with the permission of the members of the respective chambers and they cannot be armed.

=== Autodichia ===
In some matters (e.g. employment disputes) the Italian Parliament acts as its own judicial authority (without using external courts), which is referred to as "autodichia" (self-judging). In order no. 137 of 2015 of the Italian Constitutional Court, which agreed to rehear the appeal in the Lorenzoni case, which had been dismissed the year before, it was stated that autodichia might be found in violation of the independence of the judiciary.

=== Parliamentary immunity ===
The constitution defines "Parliamentary status" in articles 66, 67, 68 and 69.

Article 67 ("Prohibition on imperative mandate) states that "every member of parliament represents the nation and performs their functions without limitation by a mandate." The members are considered to receive a general mandate from the whole electorate, which cannot be revoked by the initiative of the individual electoral district which elected them, nor by their political party. This general mandate is not subject to judicial review, only political review through constitutionally defined methods (mainly elections and referendums).

Article 68 lays down the principles of immunity (insindacabilità) and inviolability (inviolabilità), stating that "the members of parliament cannot be called to account for the opinions they express or the votes that they cast in the exercise of their functions" and that "without the permission of the chamber to which they belong, no member of parliament can be subjected to a body search or a search of their home, nor can they be arrested or otherwise stripped of their personal freedom, or imprisoned, except in the execution of a final court judgement or if caught in the act of a crime for which it is compulsory to arrest someone caught in the act. An analogous standard is required in order to put members of parliament under any form of surveillance." Neither immunity nor inviolability are prerogatives of individual parliamentarians; they are intended to protect the free exercise of Parliament's functions against judicial interference, which occurred in earlier regimes when the judiciary was under Government control and was not autonomous. There is controversy with respect to the principle of immunity about what statements are expressed in the member's parliamentary role and the Constitutional Court distinguishes between political activities and parliamentary activities, and even with respect to the latter, distinguishes between activities which are immune and activities which are not immune because they contradict other constitutional principles and rights. The principle of inviolability results from Constitutional Law #3 of 1993, which revoked the earlier system of "authorisation to proceed" (autorizzazione a procedere) for convictions in cases with defined sentences.

Finally, article 69 states that "members of parliament receive compensation set down by the law," thereby affirming that parliamentarians must receive compensation and cannot renounce that compensation. This reverses the principle laid down in the Albertine Statute, which was the opposite, and is linked to the principle of equality (article 3) and the prohibition on imperative mandate (article 67).

== Electoral system ==
The national elections for the renewal of members of the Senate of the Republic and Chamber of Deputies are regulated by Law n. 165 of 3 November 2017. It introduces a mixed electoral system in the form of parallel voting (mixed-member majoritarian), with about one-third (37%) of the seats allocated using a majoritarian system (single-member districts; first-past-the-post), and the remaining about two-thirds (63%) of the seats allocated using a proportional system (multi-member districts; D'Hondt method), with one round of voting. This electoral law is colloquially known as the Rosatellum bis, or simply Rosatellum, after Ettore Rosato, member of the Chamber of Deputies for Italia Viva, first signatory of the law upon proposal of the bill to Parliament.

=== Election of the Senate of the Republic ===
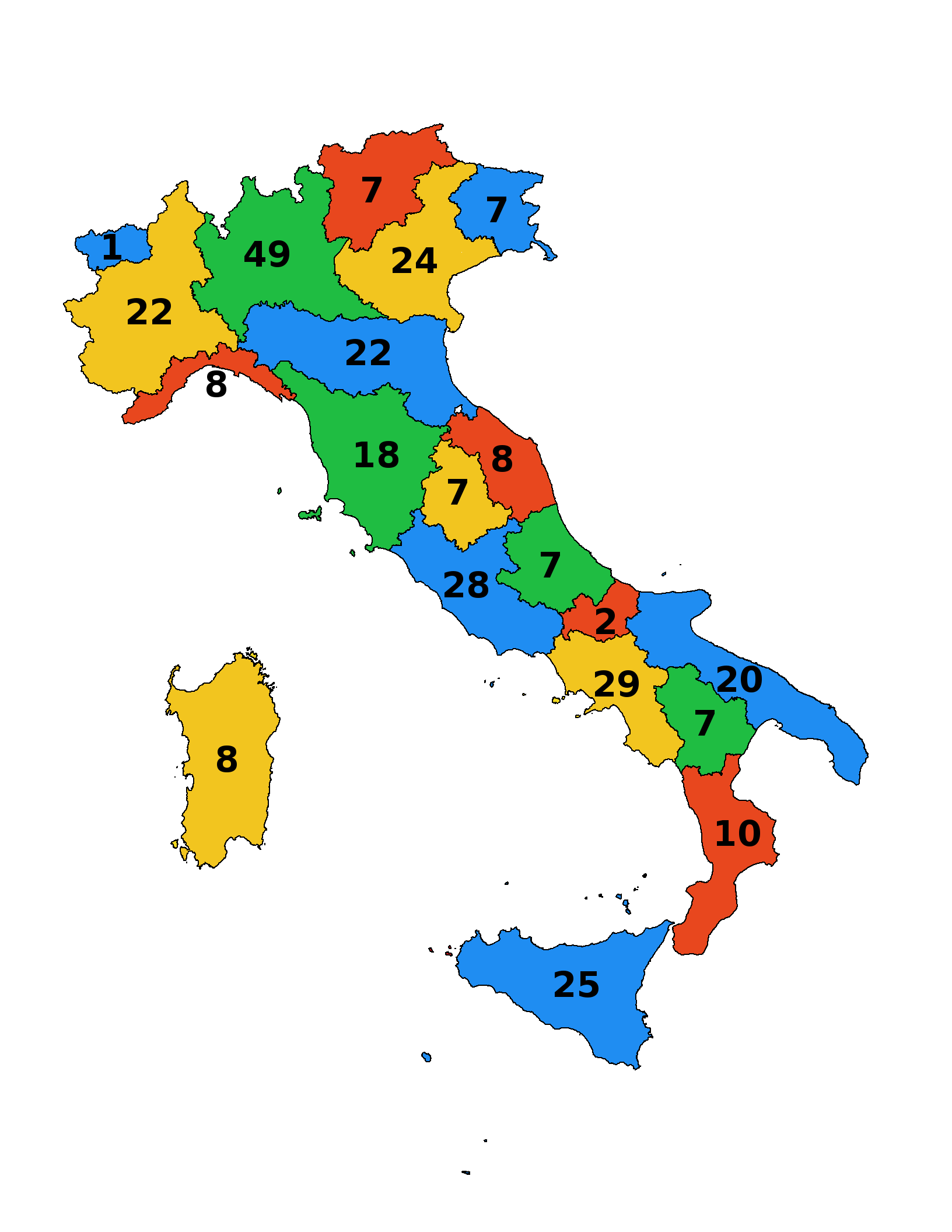
Number of senators assigned to each region before 2020.

The Senate comprises 200 members elected by universal suffrage and by citizens who are 18 or older. Out of the total number, according to the Rosatellum bis:

- 74 are directly elected in single-member districts;
- 126 are elected by proportional representation on a regional basis (of whom 4 are elected in overseas constituencies).

In addition to the elected members, the Senate, as per article 59 of the Constitution of the Italian Republic, also comprises senators for life as discussed above.

The Senate is elected on a single ballot. The ballot includes all candidates for a given single-member district (majoritarian component). For each candidate, the parties and party-lists that supported him/her are also listed, which is used to determine the proportional seats. These latter seats are allocated within each single regional constituency. A 3% minimum threshold for single party-lists is required for the proportional component (or 10% if within a coalition, so long at least one party within the coalition reached the required 3% threshold), and is calculated nationally. Notwithstanding this, a different threshold is needed for lists representing linguistic minorities, which is 20% and is calculated on a regional basis.

=== Election of the Chamber of Deputies ===
The Chamber comprises 400 members elected by universal suffrage and by citizens who are 18 or older. Out of the total number, according to the Rosatellum bis,

- 147 are directly elected in single-member districts.
- 253 are elected by proportional representation on a national basis (of whom 8 are elected in overseas constituencies).

As the Senate of the Republic, the Chamber of Deputies is elected on a single ballot, as indicated above for the Senate of the Republic. The only difference is that the proportional component is calculated based on the national average of the vote.

=== Overseas constituencies ===
The Italian Parliament is one of the few legislatures in the world to reserve seats for those citizens residing abroad. There are 8 such seats in the Chamber of Deputies and 4 in the Senate of the Republic, in accordance with Law n. 459 of 27 December 2001 (as amending articles 48, 56, and 57 of the Constitution of the Italian Republic), also known as Legge Tremaglia.

=== Graphical summary ===
Distribution of seats in the Chamber of Deputies and the Senate of the Republic
| Chamber of Deputies | | | Senate of the Republic | | |
| Graph of the party split among 400 seats. | | | Graph of the party split among 200 seats. | | |
| Method | Seats | Percentage | Method | Seats | Percentage |
| First-past-the-post | 147 | 37% | First-past-the-post | 74 | 37% |
| Proportional representation | 245 | 61% | Proportional representation | 122 | 61% |
| Overseas constituencies | 8 | 2% | Overseas constituencies | 4 | 2% |

== Membership ==
=== Senate of the Republic ===
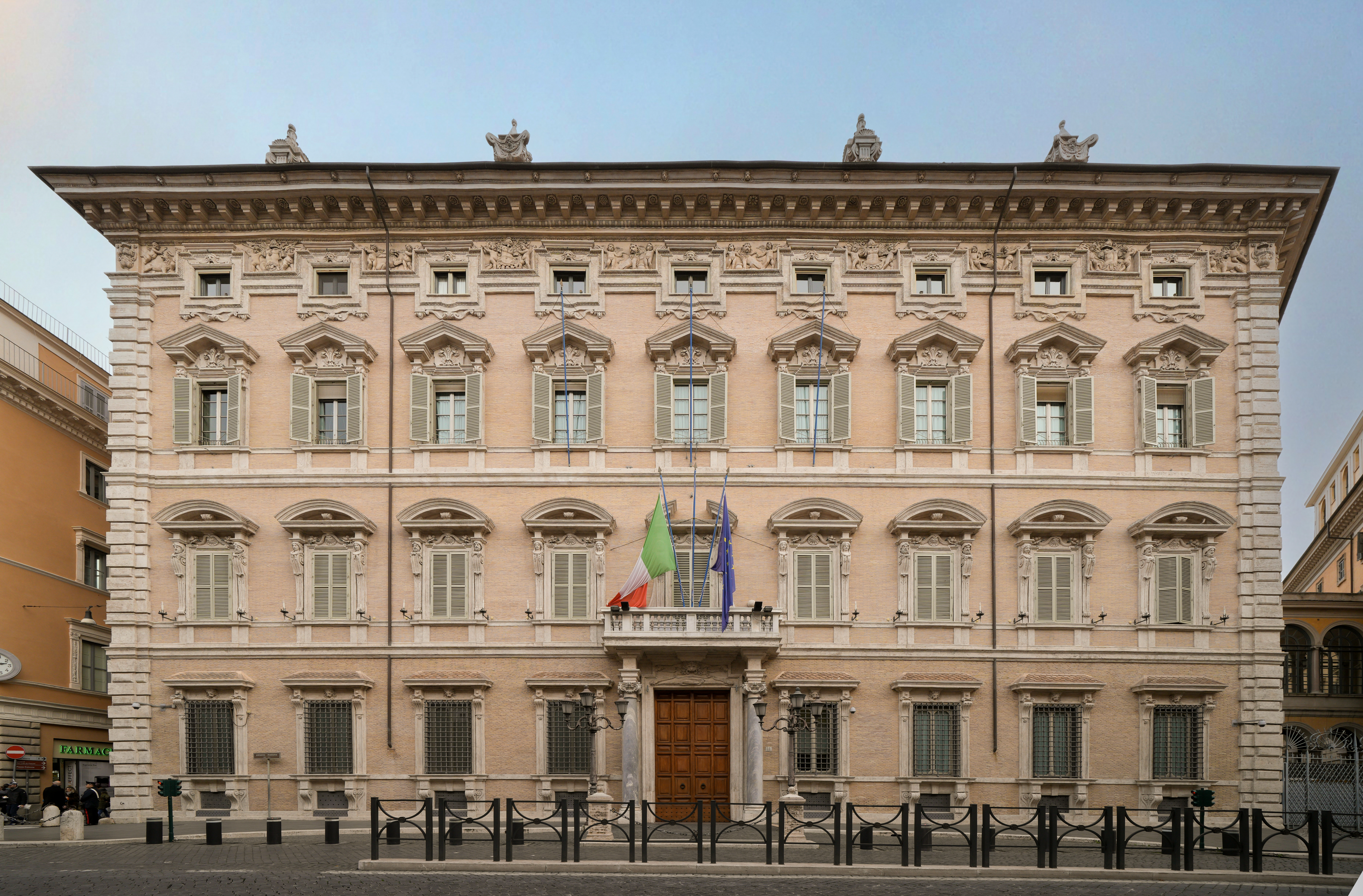
Palazzo Madama, seat of the Senate of the Republic.

The current membership of the Senate of the Republic, following the latest general election.

| Coalition | Party | Seats | % |
|---|---|---|---|
| Centre-right coalition | Brothers of Italy | 66 | 33.0 |
| Centre-right coalition | League | 29 | 14.5 |
| Centre-right coalition | Forza Italia | 20 | 10.0 |
| Centre-right coalition | Us Moderates | 5 | 2.5 |
| Centre-right coalition | Total seats | 120 | 60.0 |
| Centre-left coalition | Democratic Party-IDP | 36 | 18.0 |
| Centre-left coalition | Greens and Left Alliance | 3 | 1.5 |
| Centre-left coalition | Total seats | 39 | 19.5 |
| Five Star Movement | | 26 | 13.0 |
| Italia Viva | | 8 | 4.0 |
| Action | | 2 | 1.0 |
| South Tyrolean People's Party | | 2 | 1.0 |
| Associative Movement of Italians Abroad | | 1 | 0.5 |
| Campobase | | 1 | 0.5 |
| Green Europe | | 1 | 0.5 |
| Total | | 200 | 100 |

=== Chamber of Deputies ===
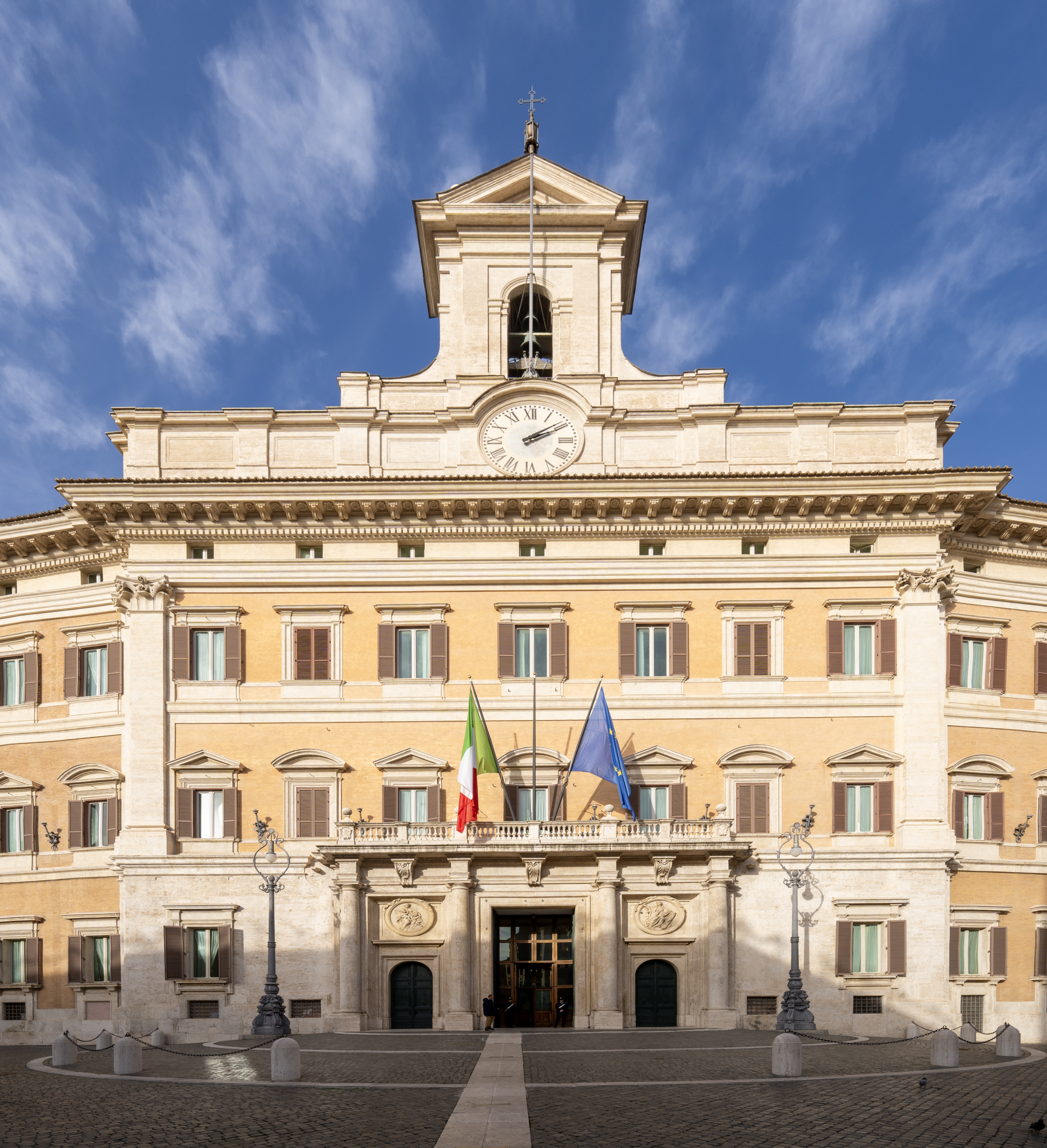
Palazzo Montecitorio, seat of the Chamber of Deputies.

The current membership of the Chamber of Deputies, following the latest general election:

| Coalition | Party | Seats | % |
|---|---|---|---|
| Centre-right coalition | Brothers of Italy | 116 | 29.00 |
| Centre-right coalition | League | 65 | 16.25 |
| Centre-right coalition | Forza Italia | 52 | 13.00 |
| Centre-right coalition | Us Moderates | 8 | 2.00 |
| Centre-right coalition | Total seats | 241 | 60.25 |
| Centre-left coalition | Democratic Party-IDP | 70 | 17.50 |
| Centre-left coalition | Greens and Left Alliance | 10 | 2.50 |
| Centre-left coalition | More Europe | 3 | 0.75 |
| Centre-left coalition | Democratic Centre | 1 | 0.25 |
| Centre-left coalition | Aosta Valley | 1 | 0.25 |
| Centre-left coalition | Total seats | 85 | 21.25 |
| Five Star Movement | | 49 | 12.25 |
| Action | | 10 | 2.50 |
| Italia Viva | | 6 | 1.50 |
| South Tyrolean People's Party | | 3 | 0.75 |
| South calls North | | 1 | 0.25 |
| Associative Movement of Italians Abroad | | 1 | 0.25 |
| Liberal Democratic Party | | 1 | 0.25 |
| Independent | | 3 | 0.75 |
| Total | | 400 | 100 |

== See also ==
- Constituent Assembly of Italy
- Italian Parliament (1928–1939)
- Politics of Italy
- Prime Minister of Italy
- Roman Senate
