= 2027 Italian general election =

- No later than 22 December 2027

All 400 seats in the Chamber of Deputies (C) 201 seats needed for a majority All 200 elective seats in the Senate of the Republic (S) 101 seats needed for a majority
- Opinion polls
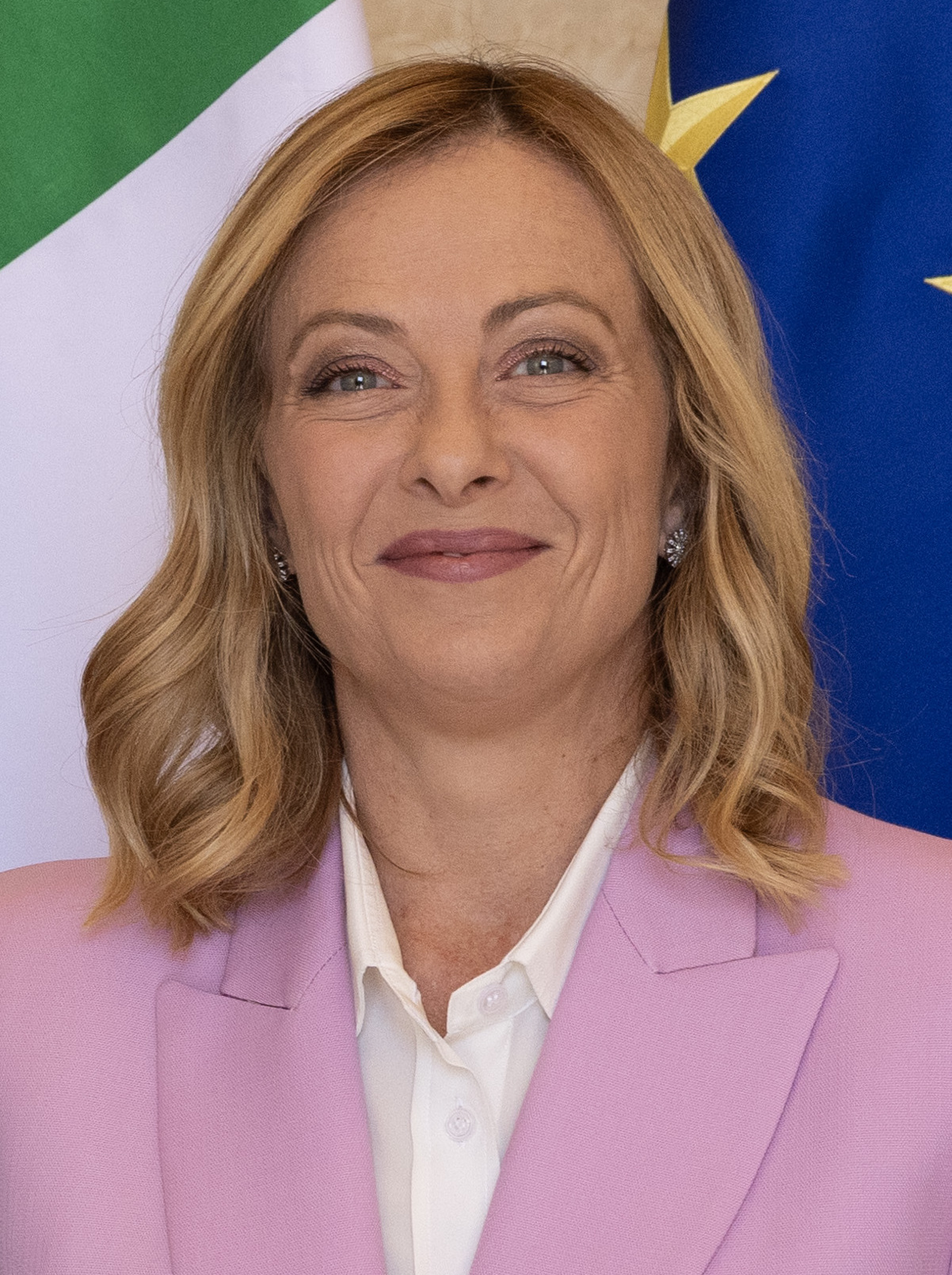

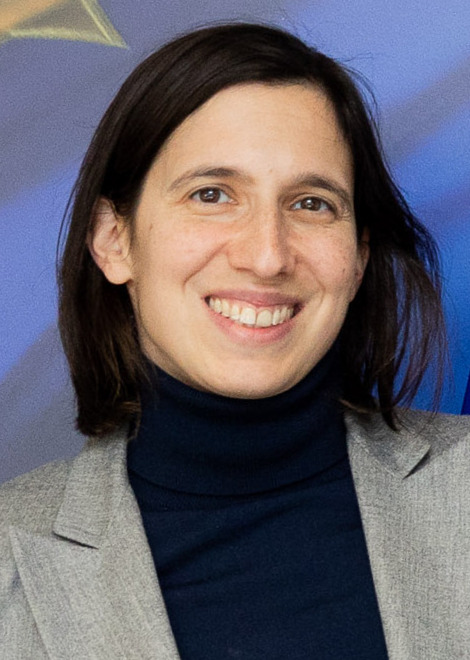

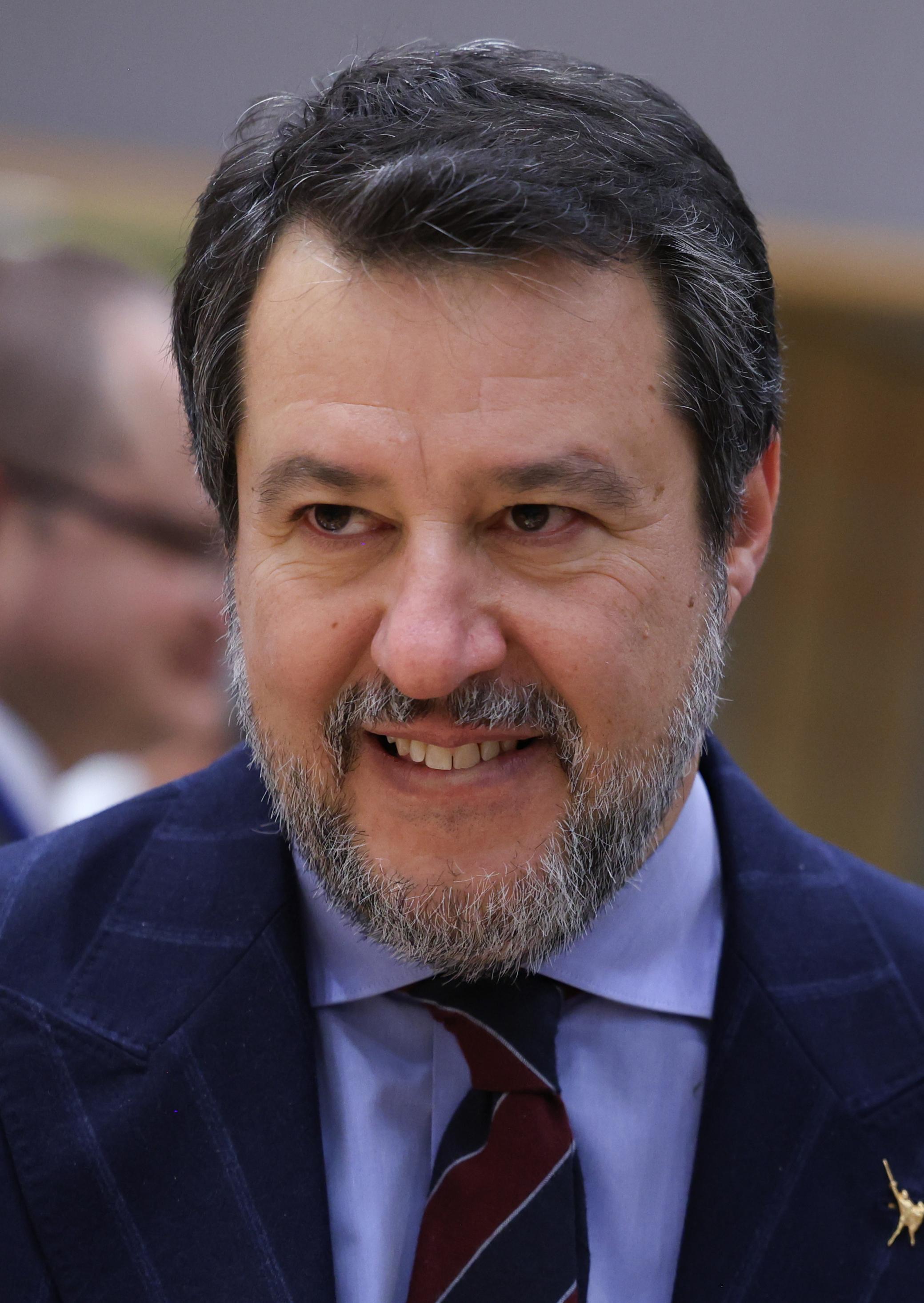

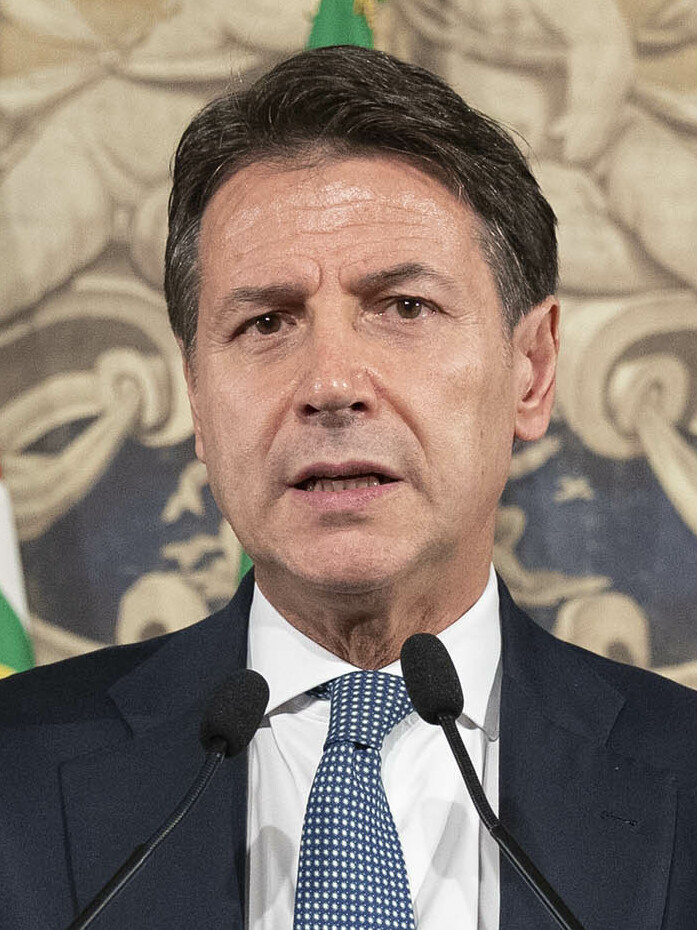

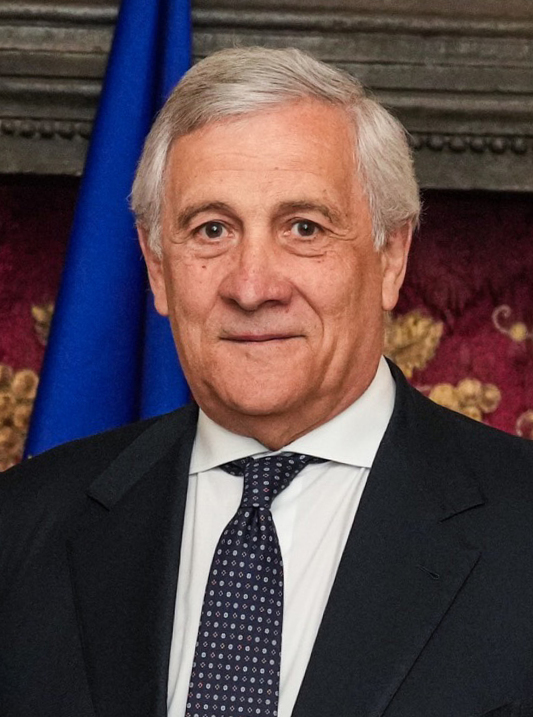

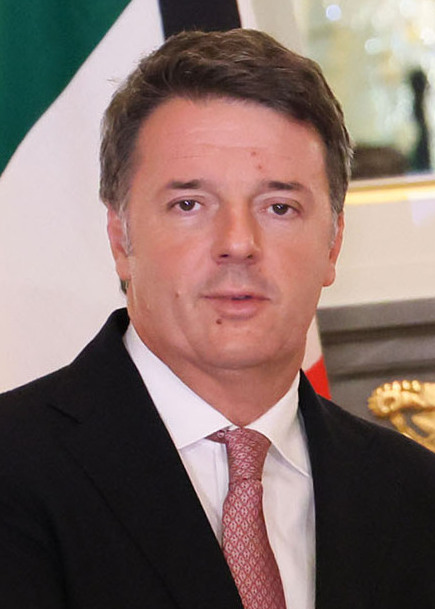

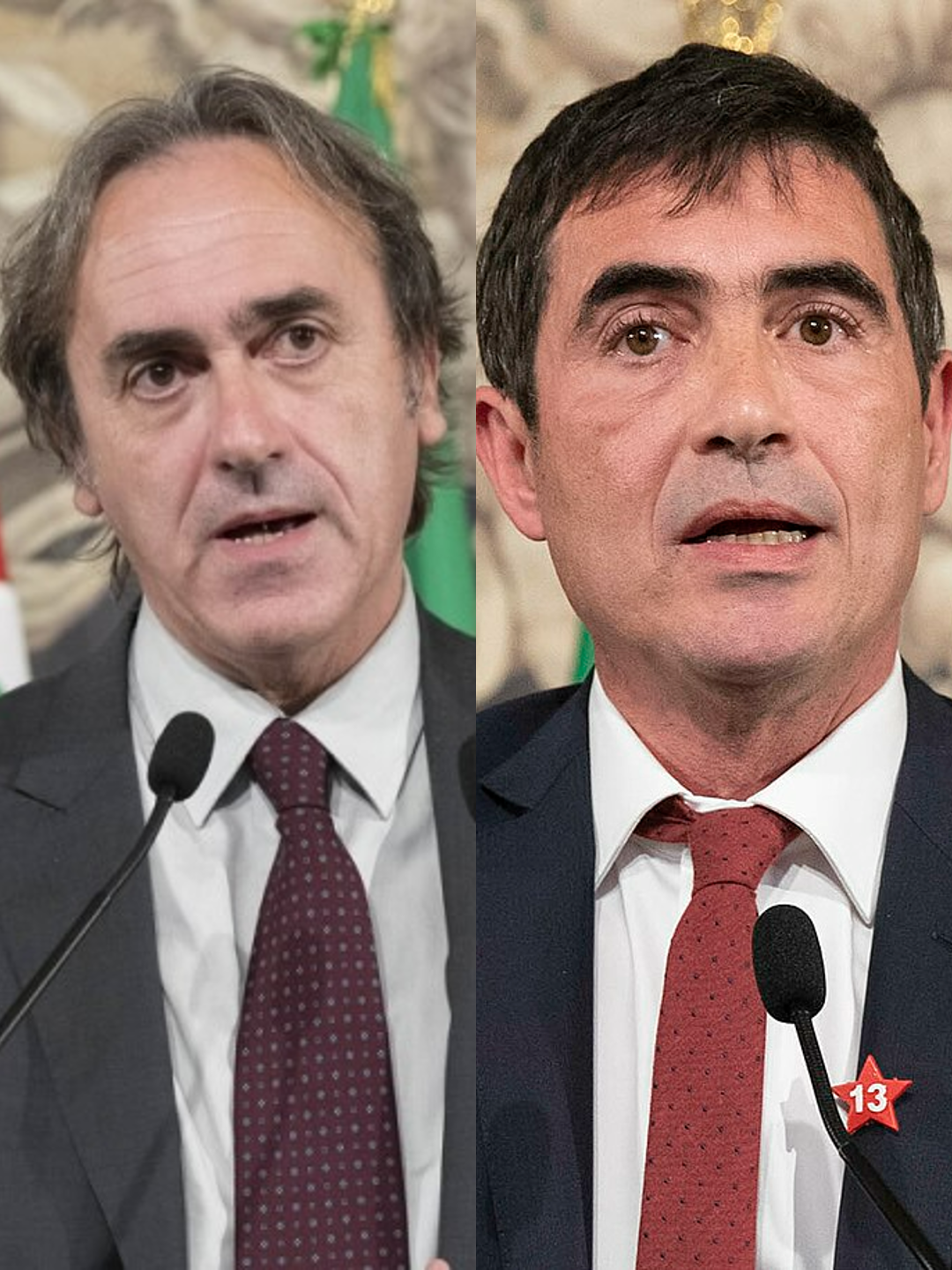

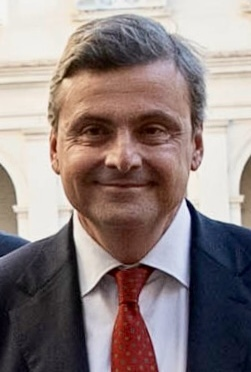

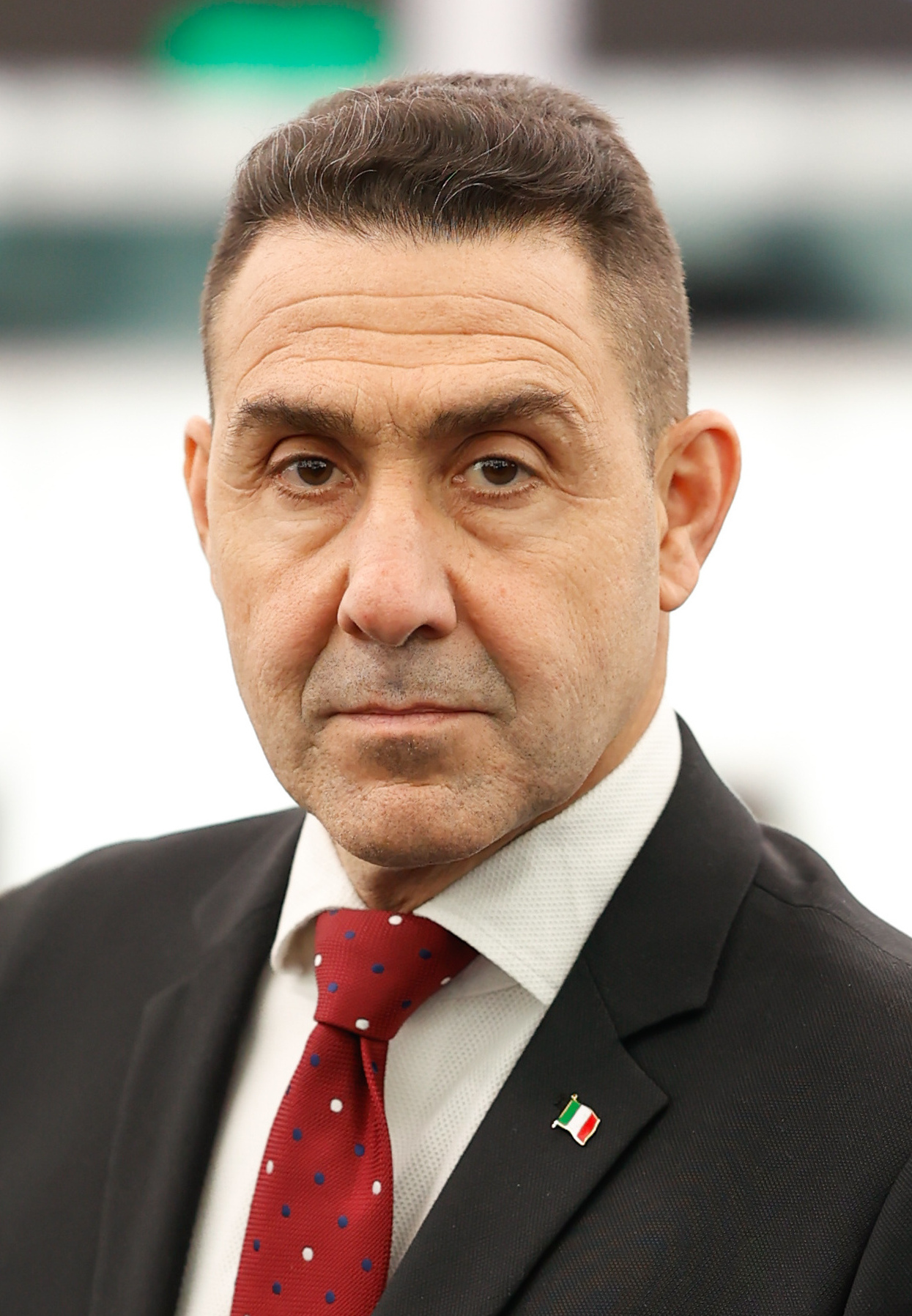
| Leader | Giorgia Meloni | Elly Schlein | Matteo Salvini |
| Party | Brothers of Italy | Democratic Party | League |
| Leader since | 8 March 2014 | 12 March 2023 | 15 December 2013 |
| Leader's seat | L'Aquila (C) | Veneto 2 (C) | Apulia (S) |
| Current seats | 116 (C) · 63 (S) | 71 (C) · 36 (S) | 57 (C) · 29 (S) |
| Leader | Giuseppe Conte | Antonio Tajani | Matteo Renzi |
| Party | Five Star Movement | Forza Italia | Italia Viva |
| Leader since | 6 August 2021 | 15 July 2023 | 23 December 2022 |
| Leader's seat | Lombardy 1 (C) | Velletri (C) | Campania (S) |
| Current seats | 48 (C) · 26 (S) | 54 (C) · 20 (S) | 7 (C) · 8 (S) |
| Leader | Angelo Bonelli & Nicola Fratoianni | Carlo Calenda | Roberto Vannacci |
| Party | Greens and Left | Action | National Future |
| Leader since | 2 July 2022 | 20 February 2022 | 6 February 2026 |
| Leader's seat | Imola (C); Tuscany 3 (C) | Sicily (S) | Did not stand |
| Current seats | 10 (C) · 3 (S) | 10 (C) · 2 (S) | 9 (C) · 0 (S) |
Incumbent Prime Minister
Giorgia Meloni
Brothers of Italy

General elections will occur in Italy no later than 22 December 2027.

Incumbent Prime Minister Giorgia Meloni, leader of the right-wing Brothers of Italy (FdI) party and head of the governing centre-right coalition, is seeking a second term after taking office in October 2022. In September 2026, Meloni's cabinet became the longest-serving government in post-war Italian history.

== Background ==
=== Government ===
In the 2022 Italian general election, the centre-right coalition led by Giorgia Meloni's Brothers of Italy (FdI) won an absolute majority of seats in the Italian Parliament. On 20 October, a few days following the elections of the presidents of the two houses of Parliament (Ignazio La Russa of FdI on 13 October for the Senate of the Republic and Lorenzo Fontana of the Lega on 14 October for the Chamber of Deputies), consultations on the formation of a new cabinet officially began.

The Cabinet was announced on 21 October and was officially sworn in on the next day. It was one of the fastest government formations in the history of the Italian Republic. The first Italian cabinet headed by a female prime minister, it was variously described as a shift to the political right, and as the first far-right-led Italian government since World War II.

Despite initial tensions among the coalition partners, the government maintained a stable parliamentary majority and, in September 2026, became the longest-serving government in the history of the Italian Republic.

During its term, the government pursued a conservative agenda, particularly on immigration, law and order, constitutional reform and social issues. It tightened immigration policies, strengthened restrictions on illegal entry and introduced measures aimed at facilitating repatriations, while also pursuing an agreement with Albania to establish migrant reception and detention facilities. On economic policy, it maintained measures introduced by the previous Draghi government to mitigate rising energy costs, introduced tax cuts and subsidies for households and businesses, and replaced the Citizens' Income (Reddito di cittadinanza) introduced by the governments of Giuseppe Conte, with more restrictive welfare schemes.

Among its most significant legislative initiatives were the introduction of differentiated regional autonomy, granting regions greater powers in several policy areas, and a constitutional reform providing for the direct election of the prime minister, known as the premierato. The former was partly curtailed by the Constitutional Court, while the latter failed to advance sufficiently to be implemented before the end of the legislature. The government also pursued a reform of the justice system, promoted by Justice Minister Carlo Nordio, providing for the separation of the careers of judges and public prosecutors and changes to the governing bodies of the judiciary. The reform was rejected in the March 2026 constitutional referendum, representing a significant political setback for Meloni.

The government also adopted a more restrictive approach to public demonstrations and security, introducing legislation increasing penalties for certain forms of protest, illegal occupations and road blockades. Other controversial measures included the abolition of the crime of abuse of office, the extension of the ban on surrogacy to Italian citizens using the procedure abroad, and the prohibition of the production and sale of cultured meat. Its policies on immigration and civil liberties, as well as its proposed constitutional changes, repeatedly attracted criticism from opposition parties and civil society organisations.

=== Opposition ===
The main opposition force following the 2022 election was the Democratic Party (PD), which had obtained approximately 19% of the vote under the leadership of Enrico Letta. The party's defeat prompted Letta's resignation and an internal leadership contest. In February 2023, Elly Schlein defeated Stefano Bonaccini in the party's primary elections, becoming the first woman to lead the PD. Under her leadership, the party adopted a more explicitly progressive profile, placing greater emphasis on social and economic inequalities, workers' rights, environmental policies, civil rights and opposition to the Meloni government's immigration and security policies. Schlein also sought to rebuild relations with other opposition forces and promote a broader centre-left alliance.

The PD achieved a significant recovery in the June 2024 European Parliament election, receiving approximately 24% of the vote and finishing second behind Meloni's FdI. The result strengthened Schlein's position within the party and established the PD as the main electoral alternative to the governing coalition. In October 2026, the party's national assembly formally endorsed Schlein as its candidate for prime minister at the next general election.

The Five Star Movement (M5S), led by former prime minister Giuseppe Conte, emerged from the 2022 election with approximately 15% of the vote, having campaigned independently of the centre-left coalition. After experiencing a major split in June 2022, when Foreign Minister Luigi Di Maio and several parliamentarians left the movement over disagreements concerning support for Ukraine and the government's military assistance to Kyiv, the M5S increasingly consolidated its position as a left-leaning opposition party. Conte placed particular emphasis on social welfare, the minimum wage, environmental protection and opposition to military spending. However, the movement's electoral support declined in the 2024 European Parliament election, when it received approximately 10% of the vote. Conte was subsequently reconfirmed as party president in October 2025.

Other opposition forces included the Greens and Left Alliance (AVS), a coalition of the Green Europe and Italian Left parties, which gradually strengthened its position within the progressive camp, and the centrist parties Action (Az), led by Carlo Calenda, and Italia Viva (IV), led by Matteo Renzi. The latter two had contested the 2022 election together under the Third Pole banner, but their project to establish a unified centrist party collapsed in April 2023 following disagreements between their leaders. They subsequently pursued separate political strategies, although IV later became involved in cooperation with the broader centre-left.

From 2024 onwards, the PD, M5S and AVS increasingly cooperated in regional elections, alongside smaller centrist parties, under the political project commonly known as the campo largo (broad camp). Nevertheless, disagreements between Schlein and Conte over leadership, foreign policy, economic priorities and the composition of a potential governing coalition repeatedly complicated efforts to establish a unified national alternative to Meloni. In October 2026, the main progressive opposition parties reached an agreement to accelerate preparations for the next general election. Schlein, Conte and the leaders of AVS agreed to draw up a common electoral programme and hold primary elections by February 2027 to select their candidate for prime minister. The proposed alliance also envisaged the involvement of centrist forces, including Renzi's IV, More Europe (+Eu), and minor parties like Civic Project Italy (PCI), Plus One (PU) and Communist Refoundation Party (PRC).

Another development within Italian politics was the emergence of a far-right opposition to Meloni with the founding of National Future (FN) by MEP Roberto Vannacci. On 3 February 2026, Vannacci left the League following months of internal tensions over his political positions and launched his own political movement. Several parliamentarians followed him into the new formation and FN held its inaugural national party congress on 13 and 14 June 2026. The party adopted a nationalist and far-right platform, advocating stricter immigration controls and a policy of remigration, opposition to the European Green Deal, a more confrontational stance towards the European Union, and a reassessment of Italy's military support for Ukraine.

== Campaign ==
Following their victory in the 2026 Italian constitutional referendum, the centre-left coalition parties began discussions to organize a primary election to choose a leader to represent the entire coalition in the 2027 Italian general election, as the electoral law approved in October 2026 (Stabilicum) required the coalition leader's name to be explicitly included. First talks started since June 2026 between the leaders of Democratic Party, Five Star Movement, and Greens and Left Alliance to discuss the campaign platform. Some key politicians like Nicola Fratoianni and Angelo Bonelli argued that primary election may harm coalition unity, advocating for another solution instead. Roberto Speranza proposed to candidate a figurehead like a partisan or an eighteen-year-old. On 30 October, Schlein, Conte, Bonelli, and Fratoianni approved a provisional roadmap to adopt a common electoral platform in November and hold the primary election in February 2027.

== Electoral system ==
The Italian electoral law of 2017 (Rosatellum) until 2026 assigned seats in both houses of the Italian Parliament using mixed-member majoritarian representation. On 8 October 2026, the Italian Parliament approved a new electoral law, allocating 400 seats in the Chamber of Deputies and 200 seats in the Senate through a majority jackpot system, in which the political coalition or party that achieved at least 42% of popular vote would automatically achieve a majority bonus majority of 70 seats in the Chamber of Deputies and 35 seats in the Senate, to ensure a majority.

To avoid excessively large majority, there is a cap on the bonus majority so that the winner does not get more than 220 seats in the Chamber and 113 in the Senate. If no coalitions or parties reach the threshold of 42%, the seats are distributed in a purely proportional manner. There is a threshold to enter parliament, set at 10% for coalitions and 3% for parties. Within a coalition, the best-performing party that falls below the 3% threshold would also receive seats. The total votes of a coalition for the purpose of triggering the majority bonus is the sum of the votes of all of its members, even those that do not reach the 3% threshold. To qualify for the majority bonus, each party or coalition must indicate its candidate for Prime Minister and its common program at the time of registration. As the President of Italy appoints the Prime Minister, this designation is not legally binding, and the name of candidate for Prime Minister will not appear on the ballot.

In this system, voters can express preferences in a hybrid system: the list leaders are fixed in place (closed list), but voters can express up to three preferences out of six remaining names in the ballot (open list), with gender alternation; if preferences are expressed without alternating between candidates' gender, the vote is void. Unlike the previous Rosatellum law, where, of the total number of list leaders, no gender can be represented by more than 60%, there is no such requirement in the current system. However, of the total number of candidates submitted by a coalition, no gender can be represented by more than 60% Opposition parties are expected to challenge the law in court, arguing, among other things, that the majority bonus distorts voter representation.

=== Signatures required ===
Following the adoption of the new electoral law, parties are required to have their own parliamentary group in either the Chamber of Deputies or the Senate at the time the elections are called in order to be included on the ballot. Otherwise, they must collect between 6,000 and 7,000 signatures in each multi-member constituency (up from the 1,500 to 2,000 signatures required under the previous electoral law) in at least half of the constituencies for either the Chamber of Deputies or the Senate. There are 49 constituencies for the Chamber of Deputies and 26 for the Senate of the Republic.

However, if a party has its own subgroup within the Mixed Group at the time the elections are called, the required number of signatures is reduced to between 1,500 and 2,000 per constituency. To form a subgroup within the Mixed Group, the Chamber of Deputies requires at least three deputies, and the party must have contested the previous general election, while the Senate requires at least one senator, and the party must have elected at least one regional councillor.

Parties representing linguistic minorities are exempt from collecting signatures in their respective constituencies if they elected at least one deputy or senator at the previous general election. If a snap election is called more than 120 days before the end of the legislature, the required number of signatures is halved.

The new electoral law includes several special provisions for the current legislature: only parties that had a parliamentary group as of 31 December 2025 are exempt from collecting signatures, while, under Article 1 subsection 9, only parties that had a subgroup within the Mixed Group as of 24 October 2026 (the date on which the law entered into force) are partially exempt from collecting signatures.

| Party | Parliamentary Status | Exemption Status |
|---|---|---|
| Brothers of Italy (FdI) | Parliamentary Group | Total Exemption |
| Democratic Party (PD) | Parliamentary Group | Total Exemption |
| League | Parliamentary Group | Total Exemption |
| Five Star Movement (M5S) | Parliamentary Group | Total Exemption |
| Forza Italia (FI) | Parliamentary Group | Total Exemption |
| Italia Viva (IV) | Parliamentary Group | Total Exemption |
| Greens and Left Alliance (AVS) | Parliamentary Group | Total Exemption |
| Action | Parliamentary Group | Total Exemption |
| Us Moderates (NM) | Parliamentary Group | Total Exemption |
| South Tyrolean People's Party (SVP) | Linguistic minorities | Total Exemption (In Trentino-Alto Adige/Südtirol) |
| Valdostan Union (UV) | Linguistic minorities | Total Exemption (In Aosta Valley) |
| National Future (FN) | Subgroup in the Mixed group | Partial Exemption |
| South calls North (ScN) | Subgroup in the Mixed group | Partial Exemption |
| More Europe (+E) | Subgroup in the Mixed group | Partial Exemption |
| Civic Project Italy (PCI) | Subgroup in the Mixed group | Partial Exemption |
| Italian Socialist Party (PSI) | Subgroup in the Mixed group | Partial Exemption |
| Communist Refoundation Party (PRC) | Subgroup in the Mixed group | Partial Exemption |
| Italy Tomorrow (ID) | Subgroup in the Mixed group | Partial Exemption |

== Members of the Parliament standing down ==
Members of Parliament not standing for re-election
| Portrait | MP | Seat | First elected | Party | Date announced | Ref. |
|---|---|---|---|---|---|---|
| | Pier Ferdinando Casini | Bologna (Senate of the Republic) | 26 June 1983 | Centrists for Europe | 11 October 2026 | |
| | Carlo Nordio | Treviso (Chamber of Deputies) | 25 September 2022 | Brothers of Italy | 31 October 2026 | |

== Date of the election ==
The term length of the Italian Parliament, as set by the Constitution, is five years starting from the day of the first meeting of Parliament. Article 61 of the Italian Constitution dictates that a general election must be held no more than 70 days after dissolution of parliament decreed by the President.

There has been speculation that the election date would be altered in order to be held between April and June 2027, as it has been customary for Italian elections to be held during spring and summer. This would require the government to resign by March 2027 and request an early dissolution of parliament, which is, contrary to Westminster convention, an exclusive prerogative of the President, who is under no obligation to grant a request from the Prime Minister to that effect.

== Opinion polls ==
=== Graphical summary ===
Local regression trend line of poll results from 25 September 2022 to the election day, with each line corresponding to the next general election party lists

=== Party vote aggregations ===
| Polling | | | Parties | | | | | | | | | | | | | Coalitions | |
| Polling aggregator | Ref. | Date updated | FdI | PD | M5S | Lega | FI | A | IV | AVS | +E | NM | FN | Others | Lead | CSX | CDX |
|---|---|---|---|---|---|---|---|---|---|---|---|---|---|---|---|---|---|
| Youtrend | | 19 Nov 2026 | 27.8 | 20.5 | 12.8 | 5.6 | 7.1 | 3.2 | 2.4 | 6.2 | 1.2 | 1.0 | 6.5 | 5.7 1.0 – South calls North; 4.7 – Others | 7.3 | 44.7 | 42.5 |
| Doppia Cifra | | 18 Nov 2026 | 27.4 | 20.7 | 12.5 | 5.7 | 7.4 | 3.0 | 2.4 | 6.4 | 1.3 | 1.1 | 6.4 | 5.0 1.2 – South calls North; 1.0 – Liberal Democratic Party; 1.0 – Italian Socialist Party; 1.0 – Civic Project Italy; 0.8 – Ora! | 6.7 | 43.2 | 42.7 |
| PolitPro | | 18 Nov 2026 | 27.5 | 20.5 | 12.7 | 5.7 | 7.2 | 3.1 | 2.4 | 6.2 | 1.3 | 1.2 | 6.7 | 5.5 1.2 – South calls North; 4.3 – Others | 7.0 | 43.1 | 42.8 |
| BiDiMedia | | 17 Nov 2026 | 27.6 | 20.3 | 12.8 | 5.9 | 7.2 | 3.0 | 2.2 | 6.2 | 1.2 | 1.1 | 6.5 | 6.0 1.0 – South calls North; 0.9 – Civic Project Italy – ControCorrente – Italian Socialist Party; 0.7 – Liberal Democratic Party; 3.4 – Others | 7.2 | 43.6 | 42.8 |
| Cassandra | | 16 Nov 2026 | 28.2 | 20.6 | 12.4 | 5.6 | 7.2 | 2.9 | 2.1 | 6.0 | 1.4 | 1.0 | 6.1 | 6.5 1.5 – Liberal Democratic Party; 1.2 – South calls North; 1.0 – Ora! 2.8 – Others | 7.6 | 42.5 | 43.2 |
| Politico Europe | | 16 Nov 2026 | 28.0 | 21.0 | 13.0 | 6.0 | 7.0 | 3.0 | 2.0 | 6.0 | 1.0 | – | 6.0 | 1.0 1.0 – South calls North | 7.0 | 43.0 | 42.0 |
| Europe Elects | | 11 Nov 2026 | 27.9 | 20.3 | 12.8 | 5.5 | 7.1 | 3.0 | 2.4 | 6.3 | 1.4 | 1.0 | 6.3 | 6.0 1.5 – Civic Project Italy – Italian Socialist Party; 1.3 – South calls North; 0.9 – Ora! 0.7 – Liberal Democratic Party; 1.6 – Others | 7.6 | 44.7 | 42.8 |
| Atlante elettorale | | 16 Sep 2026 | 26.3 | 21.1 | 12.5 | 5.7 | 7.5 | 3.8 | 4.3 | 6.6 | – | 1.2 | 7.6 | 3.4 | 5.2 | 44.5 | 40.7 |
| 2022 election | | 25 Sep 2022 | 26.0 | 19.1 | 15.4 | 8.8 | 8.1 | 7.8 (Note: As Action – Italia Viva) | | 3.6 | 2.8 | 0.9 | – | 4.9 | 6.9 | 26.1 (Note: The 2022 centre-left coalition was composed of the Democratic Party, Greens and Left Alliance, More Europe, and Civic Commitment.) | 43.8 (Note: The 2022 centre-right coalition was composed of Brothers of Italy, the League, Forza Italia, and Us Moderates.) |

=== Government approval ratings ===
Local regression trend line of poll results on government approval, with the green line corresponding to approval and the red line corresponding to disapproval.

== See also ==
- Elections in Italy
- List of next general elections
- Politics of Italy
- Second Italian Republic
