= Civics of Italy =

Parliamentary group in the Senate of Italy

Civics of Italy Civici d'Italia
- Legislature(s): Senate of the Republic
- Member parties: FdI (3 of 65); NM; UdC; CI; MAIE
- National affiliation: Centre-right coalition
- President: Michaela Biancofiore
- Representation: 8 / 205
- Political position: Centre-right

Civics of Italy (Italian: Civici d'Italia, Cd'I), officially Civics of Italy – UDC – Us Moderates (Us with Italy, Coraggio Italia, Italy in the Centre) – MAIE – Popular Centre (Italian: Civici d'Italia – UDC – Noi Moderati (Noi con l'Italia, Coraggio Italia, Italia al Centro) – MAIE – Centro Popolare), is a centre-right parliamentary group in the Senate of the Republic, established in the XIX legislature of the Italian Parliament on 18 October 2022.

== History ==
The group was established on 18 October 2022 by six senators elected with the center-right coalition, which had won the 2022 Italian general election on 25 September. Two members had been elected with Us Moderates (a list which would become a political party afterwards), one for the Associative Movement of Italians Abroad and the other three, for technical reasons, hailed from Brothers of Italy, the coalition's largest party.

In October 2022 Antonio De Poli of the Union of the Centre was unanimously elected president of the group. In March 2023 he was replaced by Michaela Biancofiore.

Between October and November 2024, two new members, who had defected from Action, joined the group.

== Composition ==
Party	Main ideology	Leader	Senators	
Party	Main ideology	Leader	Beginning	Current
Brothers of Italy (FdI)	National conservatism	Giorgia Meloni (Note: Not in the group, like the rest of the 65 senators)	3	3 (Note: Antonio Guidi, Giovanna Petrenga, Giorgio Salvitti (vice president))
Us Moderates (NM)	Liberal conservatism	Maurizio Lupi	–	2 (Note: Mariastella Gelmini, Giusy Versace)
Union of the Centre (UdC)	Christian democracy	Lorenzo Cesa	1	1 (Note: Antonio De Poli (vice president))
Coraggio Italia (CI)	Liberal conservatism	Luigi Brugnaro	1	1 (Note: Michaela Biancofiore (president))
Associative Movement of Italians Abroad (MAIE)	Italians abroad interests	Ricardo Merlo	1	1 (Note: Mario Borghese (treasurer))
Total			6	8

== Leadership ==
- President: Antonio De Poli (2022–2023), Michaela Biancofiore (2023–present)
- Vice President: Giorgio Salvitti (2022–present), Antonio De Poli (2023–present)
