= Antonio Salvatore Trevisi =

Italian politician (born 1976)

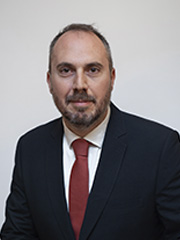
- Trevisi in 2022

Member of the Senate
- Incumbent
- Assumed office 13 October 2022
- Constituency: Apulia – P01

Personal details
- Born: 26 January 1976 (age 50)
- Party: Forza Italia (since 2024)

Antonio Salvatore Trevisi (born 26 January 1976) is an Italian politician serving as a member of the Senate since 2022. From 2015 to 2020, he was a member of the Regional Council of Apulia.
