= Paolo Marucelli =

Italian architect

- Born: 1594; Rome
- Died: 1649 (aged 54–55); Rome
- Occupation: Architect
- Known for: Facade of the Palazzo Madama

Paolo Marucelli or Maruscelli (1594—1649) was an Italian architect, most notable for the facade of the Palazzo Madama in Rome, begun to his designs in 1642 by L. Cardi. He also designed the sacristies of Santa Maria in Vallicella (1629) and Santa Maria dell'Anima (1635) and the convents of San Ignazio and Sant' Andrea della Valle.
