= Peppe De Cristofaro =

Italian politician (born 1971)

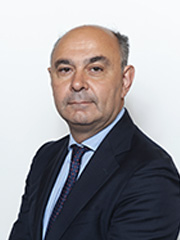
- De Cristofaro in 2022

Member of the Senate
- Incumbent
- Assumed office 13 October 2022
- Constituency: Lazio – P01
- In office 15 March 2013 – 22 March 2018
- Constituency: Campania

Member of the Chamber of Deputies
- In office 28 April 2006 – 28 April 2008
- Constituency: Campania 1

Personal details
- Born: 26 June 1971 (age 55) Naples, Italy
- Party: Italian Left (since 2017)
- Education: University of Naples Federico II

Giuseppe De Cristofaro (born 26 June 1971) is an Italian politician. He has been a member of the Senate since 2022, having previously served from 2013 to 2018. From 2006 to 2008, he was a member of the Chamber of Deputies.
