= Mixed Group =

Mixed Group Gruppo Misto
- Leader: Manfred Schullian; Peppe De Cristofaro
- Chamber of Deputies: 25 / 400
- Senate: 11 / 205

The mixed group (Italian: Gruppo Misto, GM) is a parliamentary group active in both houses of the Italian Parliament, the Chamber of Deputies and the Senate. The groups comprise all the deputies and the senators, respectively, who are not members of any other parliamentary group. For them, membership of the Mixed Groups is the default option.

Members of the Mixed Groups may form sub-groups reflecting their party affiliation. Three deputies are needed for the formation of a sub-group in the Chamber, while individual senators can form sub-groups in the Senate.

== Composition 2022–present ==
=== Chamber of Deputies ===
Sub-group	Main ideology	MPs 2022	Current
National Future–Free	Nationalism	–	9
Linguistic Minorities	Regionalism	4	4
More Europe	Liberalism	3	3
South calls North	Regionalism	–	3
Greens and Left Alliance	Eco-socialism	12	–
Us Moderates–MAIE	Liberal conservatism	9	–
Others, non-party independents		2	6
Total		30	25

=== Senate of the Republic ===
Sub-group	Main ideology	MPs 2022	Current
Greens and Left Alliance	Eco-socialism	4	3
Action	Liberalism	–	2
Forward PSI–Civic Project Italy	Reformism	–	1
Italy Tomorrow	Sovereigntism	–	1
Communist Refoundation Party	Communism	–	1
Others, non-party independents		3	3
Total		7	11

== Composition 2018–2022 ==
At the end of the 18th legislature, the group was composed by the following members:

=== Chamber of Deputies ===
Sub-group	Main ideology	MPs 2018	MPs 2022
Alternative	Populism	–	14
Vinciamo Italia–Italy in the Centre	Liberal conservatism	–	10
Coraggio Italia	Liberal conservatism	–	11
Action–More Europe–Italian Radicals	Liberalism	–	6
MAIE–PSI–FacciamoEco	Green politics	–	5
Democratic Centre	Centrism	–	5
Us with Italy–USEI–Renaissance–AdC (Note: Named just Us with Italy at the beginning of the parliamentary term.)	Liberal conservatism	4	5
Green Europe—European Greens	Green politics	–	5
Linguistic Minorities (SVP–PATT)	Regionalism	4	4
Manifesta–Power to the People–PRC	Communism	–	4
Popular Civic List–AP–PSI–AC	Centrism	4	–
More Europe–Democratic Centre–Italian Radicals	Liberalism	3	–
Others, non-party independents		7	38
Total		16	107

=== Senate of the Republic ===
Sub-group	Main ideology	MPs 2018	MPs 2022
Italy to the Centre–IDeA–Cambiamo!–Europeanists–Us of the Centre	Liberal conservatism	–	9
Free and Equal	Social democracy	4	6
More Europe–Action (Note: Named just More Europe at the beginning of the parliamentary term.)	Liberalism	1	5
Coraggio Italia–MAIE	Liberal conservatism	–	3
Italexit for Italy–Human Value Party	Euroscepticism	–	4
Manifesta–Power to the People–PRC	Communism	–	2
PSI–MAIE–USEI	Social democracy	3	–
Others, non-party independents		4	14
Total		12	42

== Composition 2013–2018 ==
As of March 2018, the Groups included 62 deputies and 28 senators. The then President of the Chamber of Deputies, Laura Boldrini, belonged to the Mixed Group.

At the end of the 17th Legislature, the group was composed by the following members:

=== Chamber of Deputies ===
Sub-group	Main ideology	MPs 2013	MPs 2018
Linguistic Minorities (SVP–PATT–SA)	Regionalism	5	6
Democratic Centre	Christian left	5	–
Italian Socialist Party–PLI	Social democracy	4	3
Italians Abroad (MAIE–USEI)	Centrism	3	–
Civics and Innovators–EpI	Centrism	–	14
Direction Italy	Liberal conservatism	–	10
Union of the Centre–IdeA	Christian democracy	–	6
Free Alternative	Direct democracy	–	5
Others, non-party independents		1	18
Total		18	62

=== Senate of the Republic ===
Sub-group	Main ideology	MPs 2013	MPs 2018
Left Ecology Freedom / Italian Left	Democratic socialism	7	7
Italy of Values	Populism	–	2
Together for Italy	Liberalism	–	2
Brothers of Italy	National conservatism	–	1
Progressive Camp	Progressivism	–	1
X Movement	Populism	–	1
Civic Liguria	Liberalism	–	1
More Apulia Movement	Regionalism	–	1
Others, non-party independents		4	12
Total		11	28

== Composition 2008–2013 ==
At the end of the 16th Legislature, the group was composed by the following members:

=== Chamber of Deputies ===
Sub-group	Main ideology	MPs 2008	MPs 2013
Movement for the Autonomies	Regionalism	8	4
Linguistic Minorities (SVP–ALD)	Regionalism	3	3
Great South–PPA	Regionalism	–	10
Free Italy–Liberals for Italy–Italian Liberal Party	Liberalism	–	10
Rights and Freedom	Social democracy	–	5
Democratic Centre	Centrism	–	4
FareItalia for the Popular Constituent	National conservatism	–	4
Italian Republican Party	Liberalism	–	4
Liberal Democrats–MAIE	Centrism	–	3
Autonomy South–Southern League Ausonia	Autonomism	–	3
Liberal Initiative	Liberalism	–	3
Others, non-party independents		3	18
Total		14	53

=== Senate of the Republic ===
Sub-group	Main ideology	MPs 2008	MPs 2013
Movement for the Autonomies	Regionalism	2	3
Common People's Territorial Movement	Federalism	–	2
Democratic Participation	Centrism	–	2
Italian Republican Party	Liberalism	–	1
Rights and Freedom	Social democracy	–	1
Autonomist Socialist Movement	Autonomism	–	1
Pensioner's Party	Pensioners' interests	–	1
Democratic Union for Consumers	Centrism	–	1
Others, non-party independents		4	6
Total		6	18

== Composition 2006–2008 ==
At the end of the 15th Legislature, the group was composed by the following members:

=== Chamber of Deputies ===
Sub-group	Main ideology	MPs 2006	MPs 2008
Movement for the Autonomies	Regionalism	5	6
Linguistic Minorities (SVP–PATT–ALD)	Regionalism	5	5
The Right	National conservatism	–	4
Others, non-party independents		3	8
Total		13	18

=== Senate of the Republic ===
Sub-group	Main ideology	MPs 2006	MPs 2008
Italy of Values	Anti-corruption	5	3
Autonomies (SVP–RV)	Regionalism	4	–
Populars UDEUR	Christian democracy	3	2
Movement for the Autonomies	Regionalism	2	–
Christian Democracy for Autonomies	Christian democracy	2	–
Southern Democratic Party	Autonomism	1	1
The Right	National conservatism	–	3
Socialist Party	Social democracy	–	3
Liberal Democrats	Liberalism	–	3
Democratic Union for Consumers	Centrism	–	2
Italians in the World	Centrism	–	1
Citizens' Political Movement	Populism	–	1
Critical Left	Trotskyism	–	1
Popular Civic Federative Movement	Christian democracy	–	1
Others, non-party independents		7	10
Total		24	32

== Composition 2001–2006 ==
At the end of the 14th Legislature, the group was composed by the following members:

=== Chamber of Deputies ===
Sub-group	Main ideology	MPs 2001	MPs 2006
Party of Italian Communists	Communism	10	10
Italian Democratic Socialists	Social democracy	9	11
Federation of the Greens	Green politics	8	7
Linguistic Minorities (SVP–UV)	Regionalism	5	5
New Italian Socialist Party	Social democracy	3	6
Union of Democrats for Europe	Christian democracy	–	11
Democratic Ecologists	Ecologism	–	4
European Republicans Movement	Social liberalism	–	3
Others, non-party independents		7	7
Total		41	64

=== Senate of the Republic ===
Sub-group	Main ideology	MPs 2001	MPs 2006
Italian Democratic Socialists	Social democracy	6	6
Communist Refoundation Party	Communism	4	4
Party of Italian Communists	Communism	2	2
Lombard Alliance	Regionalism	1	1
New Italian Socialist Party	Social democracy	1	1
Italian Republican Party	Social liberalism	1	1
Tricolour Flame	Neo-fascism	1	1
Freedom and Justice for the Olive Tree	Social democracy	1	2
Lombard Territory Movement	Regionalism	1	–
Union of Democrats for Europe	Christian democracy	–	5
Italy of Values	Anti-corruption	–	2
House of Freedoms	Conservatism	–	1
Christian Democracy for Autonomies	Christian democracy	–	1
Others, non-party independents		5	7
Total		23	34

== Composition 1996–2001 ==
At the end of the 13th Legislature, the group was composed by the following members:

=== Chamber of Deputies ===
Sub-group	Main ideology	MPs 1996	MPs 2001
Federation of the Greens	Green politics	14	12
Linguistic Minorities (SVP–UV)	Regionalism	5	5
The Network	Christian left	3	–
Communist Refoundation Party	Communism	–	14
Christian Democratic Centre	Christian democracy	–	12
Italian Socialists / Italian Democratic Socialists	Social democracy	–	8
United Christian Democrats	Christian democracy	–	6
Italian Renewal	Liberalism	–	6
Federalists, Liberal Democrats and Republicans	Liberalism	–	4
Segni Pact – Reformers	Christian democracy	–	3
Others, non-party independents		4	24
Total		26	94

=== Senate of the Republic ===
Sub-group	Main ideology	MPs 1996	MPs 2001
Linguistic Minorities (SVP–UV)	Regionalism	3	3
Tricolour Flame	Neo-fascism	1	1
Sardinian Action Party	Sardinian nationalism	1	1
League of Regions	Regionalism	1	1
The Network	Christian left	1	–
Communist Group	Communism	–	6
Italian Renewal	Liberalism	–	6
The Democrats	Centrism	–	5
Communist Refoundation Party	Communism	–	3
Italian Socialists / Italian Democratic Socialists	Social democracy	–	3
Reformist Centre	Christian democracy	–	2
United Christian Democrats	Christian democracy	–	1
Pannella List	Liberalism	–	1
Italy of Values	Anti-corruption	–	4
Democratic People's Union	Christian democracy	–	1
Others, non-party independents		8	8
Total		15	43
