= Andrea de Bertoldi =

Italian politician (born 1966)

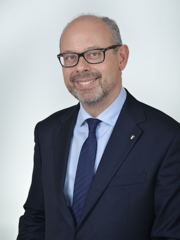
- de Bertoldi in 2018

Member of the Chamber of Deputies
- Incumbent
- Assumed office 13 October 2022
- Succeeded by: Pietro Patton
- Constituency: Trentino-Alto Adige – 01

Member of the Senate
- In office 23 March 2018 – 12 October 2022
- Constituency: Trentino-Alto Adige – 01

Personal details
- Born: 12 May 1966 (age 60)
- Party: Independent (since 2024)

Andrea de Bertoldi (born 12 May 1966) is an Italian politician serving as a member of the Chamber of Deputies since 2022. From 2018 to 2022, he was a member of the Senate.

== Biography ==
Born in Bolzano, he lives in Trento, where he earned a degree in Economics and Business Administration; he owns two accounting firms, in Cles and Trento, and is a co-owner of another accounting firm in Rome, which he runs jointly with former Member of Parliament Maurizio Leo.

He began his political career in the Bolzano Youth Front (Italy), and later joined the National Alliance (Italy), on whose ticket he ran—though was not elected—for the Chamber of Deputies in the Trentino-Alto Adige district during the 2006 general election. He served as president of the FareFuturo for Trentino.

In 2009, he joined the The People of Freedom, which he left in 2010 to follow Gianfranco Fini to the new party, Future and Freedom, where he became the provincial coordinator for Trento. The party, however, ceased operations in 2014.

On December 2, 2017, he officially joined Brothers of Italy.
