= Ilaria Cucchi =

Italian human rights campaigner

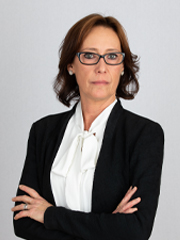

Member of the Senate
- Incumbent
- Assumed office 13 October 2022
- Constituency: Florence

Personal details
- Born: 22 June 1974 (age 52) Rome, Italy
- Party: Italian Left
- Occupation: Activist

Ilaria Cucchi (born 22 June 1974) is an Italian human rights activist and politician.

She has campaigned for investigation of the death in police custody of her brother, Stefano Cucchi. In 2013 she was an unsuccessful candidate in elections for the national parliament with "Rivoluzione Civile - Lista Ingroia". The street artist Jorit Agoch painted a mural portrait of her in via Verrotti all'Arenella, Naples, in 2018. After the 2022 Italian general elections, she became a member of the Senate for the centre-left coalition.

== Biography ==
Ilaria Cucchi was born in Rome to a father who was a land surveyor and a mother who was a Teacher. After earning a diploma as an IT specialist, she obtained a second diploma as a land surveyor in 2022 and was admitted to the Rome Register of Land Surveyors on January 13, 2025. Her partner is Fabio Anselmo, who previously served as the Cucchi family’s attorney in the case of Stefano Cucchi’s murder.

== See also ==
- On My Skin (2018 film)
