= Fabrizio Sala =

Italian politician (born 1971)

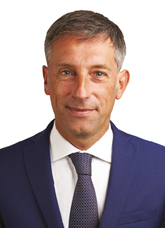
- Sala in 2022

Member of the Chamber of Deputies
- Incumbent
- Assumed office 13 October 2022
- Constituency: Lombardy 1 – 02

Personal details
- Born: 13 June 1971 (age 55)
- Party: Forza Italia

Fabrizio Sala (born 13 June 1971) is an Italian politician serving as a member of the Chamber of Deputies since 2022. He served as vice president of Lombardy from 2015 to 2021 and from 2022 to 2023. From 1999 to 2009, he served as mayor of Misinto.
