= Senate of the Republic (Italy) =

Upper house of the Italian Parliament

Coordinates: 41°53′57.09″N 12°28′27.4″E

Senate of the Republic Senato della Repubblica
- 19th legislature (list)
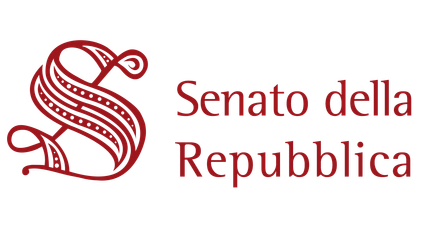

Type
- Type: Upper house of the Italian Parliament

Leadership
- President: Ignazio La Russa, FdI since 13 October 2022
- Vice Presidents: Licia Ronzulli (FI); Gian Marco Centinaio (Lega); Anna Rossomando (PD); Maria Domenica Castellone (M5S) since 19 October 2022

Structure
- Seats: 205 (200 elected + 5 senators for life)
- Political groups: Government (112): FdI (63); LSP–PSd'Az (30) (Note: Lega (30)); FI–BP–PPE (19); Supported by (8): CdI (7) (Note: NM (3) (Note: MAIE (1)); FdI (2); CI (1); UdC (1)); Mixed (1); Opposition (85): PD–IDP (35) (Note: PD (34); CpE (1)); M5S (25); IV–CR (8); Aut. (SVP-PATT, CB) (7) (Note: SVP (2); Senators for life (2); Campobase (1); PD (1); Greens (1)); Mixed (10) (Note: AVS (3) (Note: SI (2); Ind. (1)); Senators for life (3); AZ–RE (2); A–PSI–PCI (1) (Note: M5S (1)); PRC–SE–OS (1))

Elections
- Voting system: Parallel voting: 79 FPTP seats, 121 PR seats with 3% electoral threshold (D'Hondt method)
- Last election: 25 September 2022
- Next election: No later than 2027

Meeting place
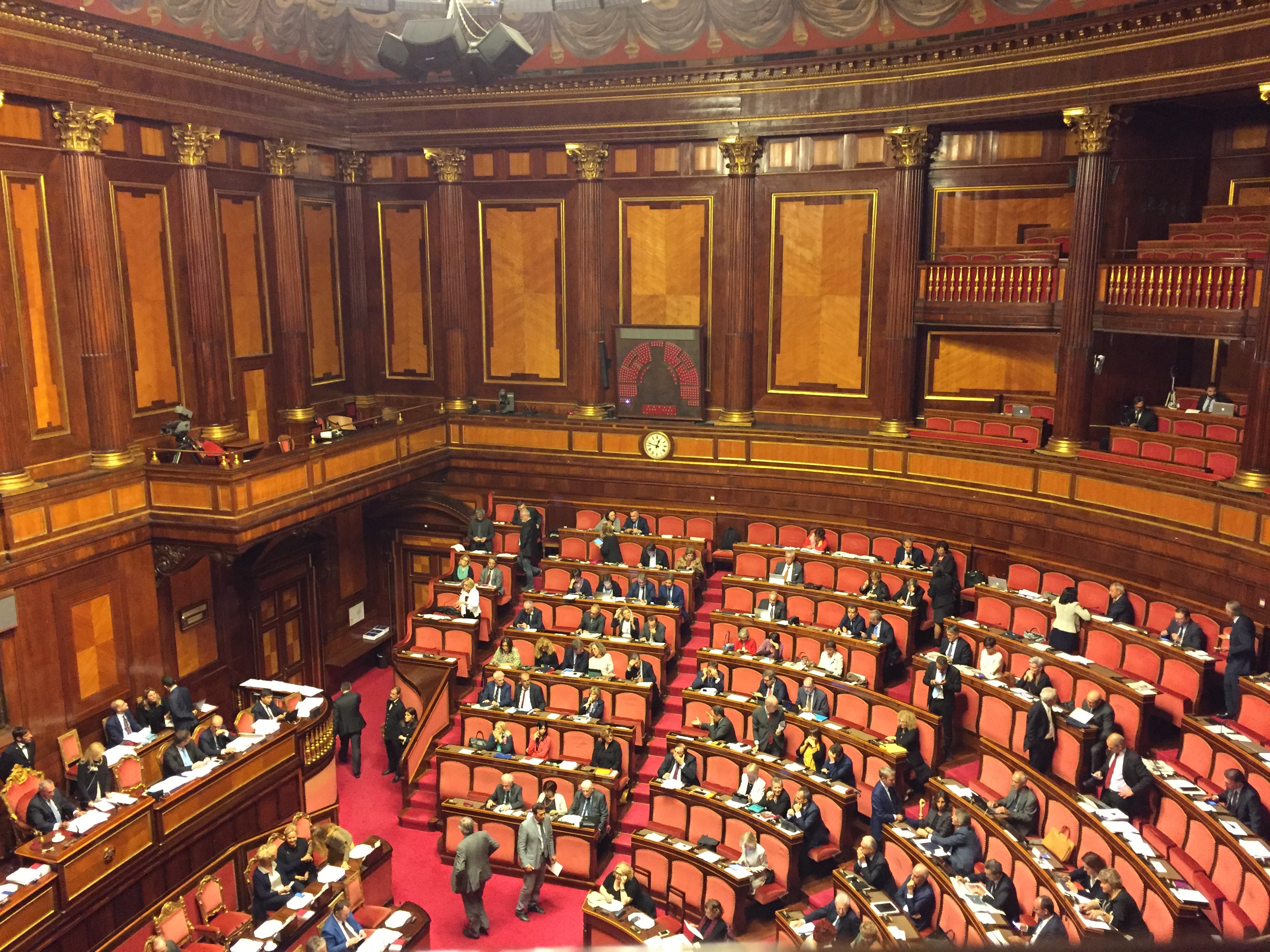
- Palazzo Madama, Rome

Website
- www.senato.it/home

The Senate of the Republic (Italian: Senato della Repubblica), or simply the Senate (Italian: Senato [seˈnaːto]), is the upper house of the bicameral Italian Parliament, the lower house being the Chamber of Deputies. The two houses together form a perfect bicameral system, meaning they perform identical functions, but do so separately.

Pursuant to the Articles 57, 58, and 59 of the Italian Constitution, the Senate has 200 elective members, of which 196 are elected from Italian constituencies, and 4 from Italian citizens living abroad. Furthermore, a small number (currently 5) serve as senators for life (senatori a vita), either appointed or ex officio. It was established in its current form on 8 May 1948, but previously existed during the Kingdom of Italy as Senato del Regno (Senate of the Kingdom), itself a continuation of the Senato Subalpino (Subalpine Senate) of Sardinia established on 8 May 1848. Members of the Senate are styled Senator or The Honourable Senator (Italian: Onorevole Senatore) and they meet at Palazzo Madama, Rome.

== Composition ==
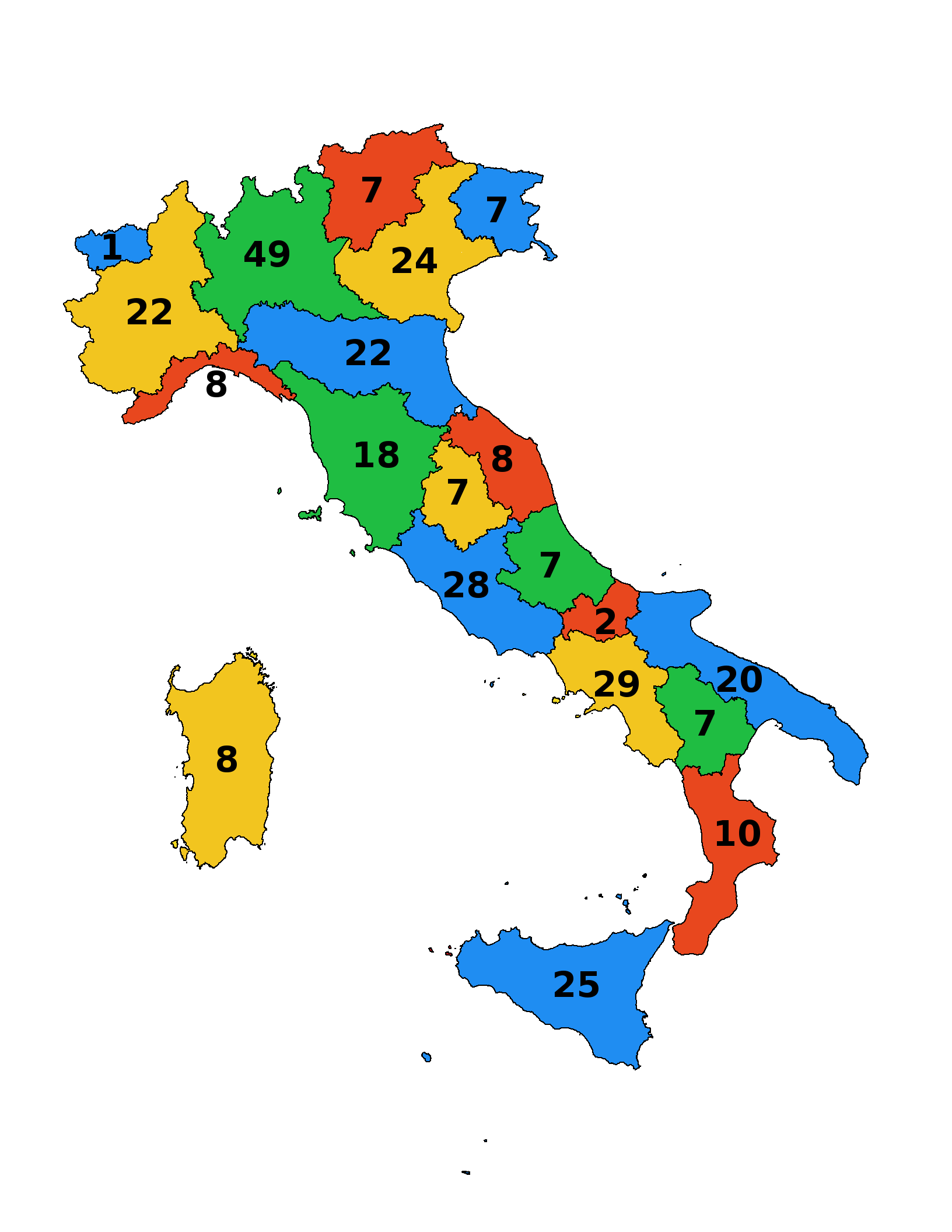
Number of senators assigned to each region before 2020

Article 57 of the Constitution of Italy originally established that the Senate of the Republic was to be elected on a regional basis by Italian citizens aged 25 or older (unlike the Chamber of the Deputies, which was elected on a national basis and by all Italian citizens aged 18 or older). No region could have less than 7 senators, except for the two smallest regions: Aosta Valley (1 senator) and Molise (2 senators). From 2006 to 2020, 6 out of 315 senators (and 12 out of 630 deputies) were elected by Italians residing abroad.

After two constitutional amendments were passed respectively in 2020 (by constitutional referendum) and 2021, however, there have been changes. The Senate is still elected on a regional basis, but the number of senators was reduced from 315 to 200, who are now elected by all citizens aged 18 or older, just like deputies (themselves being reduced from 630 to 400).

Italians residing abroad now elect 4 senators (and 8 deputies). The remaining 196 senators are assigned to each region proportionally according to their population. The amended Article 57 of the Constitution provides that no region can have fewer than 3 senators representing it, barring Aosta Valley and Molise, which retained 1 and 2 senators respectively.

Region	Seats
Abruzzo	4
Aosta Valley	1
Apulia	13
Basilicata	3
Calabria	6
Campania	18
Emilia-Romagna	14
Friuli Venezia Giulia	4
Lazio	18
Liguria	5
Lombardy	31
Marche	5
Molise	2
Piedmont	14
Sardinia	5
Sicily	16
Trentino-Alto Adige/Südtirol	6
Tuscany	12
Umbria	3
Veneto	16
Overseas constituencies	4

The senators for life are either former presidents of the Italian Republic who hold office ex officio or one of up to five citizens who are appointed by presidents of Italy "for outstanding merits in the social, scientific, artistic or literary field". The current life senators are:

Senator for life	Appointment	Since	Parliamentary group
Mario Monti; Economist, Former Prime Minister	Appointed by Giorgio Napolitano	9 November 2011	Mixed Group
Elena Cattaneo; Professor of pharmacology	Appointed by Giorgio Napolitano	30 August 2013	For the Autonomies
Renzo Piano; Pritzker Prize-winning architect	Appointed by Giorgio Napolitano	30 August 2013	Mixed Group
Carlo Rubbia; Nobel Prize-winning particle physicist and inventor	Appointed by Giorgio Napolitano	30 August 2013	For the Autonomies
Liliana Segre; Holocaust survivor	Appointed by Sergio Mattarella	19 January 2018	Mixed Group

The current term of the Senate is five years, except for senators for life that hold their office for their lifetime. Until a Constitutional change on 9 February 1963, the Senate was elected for six-year terms. The Senate may be dissolved before the expiration of its normal term by the president of the Republic (e.g. when no government can obtain a majority).

=== Electoral system and election of the Senate ===
According to article 58 of the Italian constitution, Italian citizens aged 18 onwards (until 2021 25 years) are enabled to vote for the Senate.

The electoral system is a parallel voting system, with 37% of seats allocated using first-past-the-post voting (FPTP) and 63% using proportional representation, allocated with the largest remainder method, with one round of voting.

- The 200 elected senators are elected in:
  - 74 in single-member constituencies, by plurality;
  - 122 in multi-member constituencies, by regional proportional representation;
  - 4 in 4 single-member abroad constituencies, by plurality.

For Italian residents, each house members are elected by single ballots, including the constituency candidate and his/her supporting party lists. In each single-member constituency the deputy/senator is elected on a plurality basis, while the seats in multi-member constituencies will be allocated nationally. In order to be calculated in single-member constituency results, parties need to obtain at least 1% of the national vote. In order to receive seats in multi-member constituencies, parties need to obtain at least 3% of the national vote. Elects from multi-member constituencies will come from closed lists. The single voting paper, containing both first-past-the-post candidates and the party lists, shows the names of the candidates to single-member constituencies and, in close conjunction with them, the symbols of the linked lists for the proportional part, each one with a list of the relative candidates.

Voters can cast their votes in three different ways:

- Drawing a sign on the symbol of a list: in this case the vote extends to the candidate in the single-member constituency which is supported by that list.
- Drawing a sign on the name of the candidate of the single-member constituency and another one on the symbol of one list that supports them: the result is the same as that described above; it is not allowed, under penalty of annulment, the panachage, so the voter can not vote simultaneously for a candidate in the FPTP constituency and for a list which is not linked to them.
- Drawing a sign only on the name of the candidate for the FPTP constituency, without indicating any list: in this case, the vote is valid for the candidate in the single-member constituency and also automatically extended to the list that supports them; if that candidate is however connected to several lists, the vote is divided proportionally between them, based on the votes that each one has obtained in that constituency.

== Reform proposals ==
In 2016, the Italian Parliament passed a constitutional law that "effectively abolishes the Senate as an elected chamber and sharply restricts its ability to veto legislation". The law was rejected on 4 December 2016 by a referendum, leaving the Senate unchanged.

== Membership ==
The membership of the Senate following the 2022 Italian general election:

Coalition	Party	Seats	%
Centre-right coalition	Brothers of Italy (FdI)	66	32.0
Centre-right coalition	Lega	29	14.1
Centre-right coalition	Forza Italia (FI)	18	8.7
Centre-right coalition	Us Moderates (NM)	2	1.0
Centre-right coalition	Total seats	115	55.8
Centre-left coalition	Democratic Party – IDP (PD–IDP)	40	19.4
Centre-left coalition	Greens–Left (AVS)	4	1.9
Centre-left coalition	Total seats	44	21.4
Five Star Movement (M5S)		28	13.6
Action – Italia Viva (A–IV)		9	4.4
South Tyrolean People's Party – PATT (SVP–PATT)		2	1.0
South calls North (ScN)		1	0.5
Associative Movement of Italians Abroad (MAIE)		1	0.5
Senators for life		6	2.9
Total		206	100

Popular vote (S)
CDX	44.02%
CSX	25.99%
M5S	15.55%
A–IV	7.73%
Others	6.71%

Distribution of the 200 elective parliamentary seats (S)
CDX	57.5%
CSX	22.0%
M5S	14.0%
A–IV	4.5%
Others	2.0%

== Presidents ==
Under the current Constitution, the Senate must hold its first sitting no later than 20 days after a general election. That session, presided by the oldest senator, proceeds to elect the president of the Senate for the following parliamentary period. On the first two attempts at voting, an absolute majority of all senators is needed; if a third round is needed, a candidate can be elected by an absolute majority of the senators present and voting. If this third round fails to produce a winner, a final ballot is held between the two senators with the highest votes in the previous ballot. In the case of a tie, the elder senator is deemed the winner.

In addition to overseeing the business of the chamber, chairing and regulating debates, deciding whether motions and bills are admissible, representing the Senate, etc., the president of the Senate stands in for the president of the Republic when the latter is unable to perform the duties of the office; in this case the Senate is headed by a vice president.

The current president of the Senate is Ignazio La Russa.

Name	Period	Legislature
Ivanoe Bonomi (PSDI)	8 May 1948 – 20 April 1951	I
Enrico De Nicola (PLI)	28 April 1951 – 24 June 1952	I
Giuseppe Paratore (PLI)	26 June 1952 – 24 March 1953	I
Meuccio Ruini (Independent)	25 March 1953 – 25 June 1953	I
Cesare Merzagora (Independent)	25 June 1953 – 7 November 1967	II, III, IV
Ennio Zelioli-Lanzini (DC)	8 November 1967 – 4 June 1968	IV
Amintore Fanfani (DC)	5 June 1968 – 26 June 1973	V, VI
Giovanni Spagnolli (DC)	27 June 1973 – 4 July 1976	VI
Amintore Fanfani (DC)	5 July 1976 – 1 December 1982	VII, VIII
Tommaso Morlino (DC)	9 December 1982 – 6 May 1983	VIII
Vittorino Colombo (DC)	12 May 1983 – 11 July 1983	VIII
Francesco Cossiga (DC)	12 July 1983 – 24 June 1985	IX
Amintore Fanfani (DC)	9 July 1985 – 17 April 1987	IX
Giovanni Malagodi (PLI)	22 April 1987 – 1 July 1987	IX
Giovanni Spadolini (PRI)	2 July 1987 – 14 April 1994	X, XI
Carlo Scognamiglio (FI)	16 April 1994 – 8 May 1996	XII
Nicola Mancino (PPI)	9 May 1996 – 30 May 2001	XIII
Marcello Pera (FI)	30 May 2001 – 27 April 2006	XIV
Franco Marini (PD)	29 April 2006 – 28 April 2008	XV
Renato Schifani (PdL)	29 April 2008 – 14 March 2013	XVI
Pietro Grasso (PD)	16 March 2013 – 22 March 2018	XVII
Elisabetta Casellati (FI)	24 March 2018 – 13 October 2022	XVIII
Ignazio La Russa (FdI)	13 October 2022 – Incumbent	XIX

== Historical composition ==
=== Since 1994 ===
PRC / PdCI/IcU / PDS/DS / PSI / FdV / NPSI / AD / LR / IdV / DL / RI / PPI / UDEUR / VdA / SVP / Others / PS / CCD+CDU/UDC / LN / FI / AN
1994	18 / 76 / 9 / 7 / 6 / 6 / 1 / 3 / 4 / 31 / 12 / 34 / 60 / 48
1996	10 / 102 / 14 / 1 / 11 / 27 / 1 / 2 / 4 / 25 / 48 / 27 / 43
2001	4 / 2 / 64 / 8 / 1 / 1 / 43 / 1 / 1 / 3 / 14 / 29 / 82 / 17 / 45
2006	27 / 11 / 65 / 4 / 43 / 3 / 3 / 3 / 21 / 80 / 14 / 41

SEL / AVS / LeU / PD / M5S / A–IV / IdV / SC / VdA / SVP / Others / UdC / NM / MpA / PdL/FI / LN/LSP / FdI
2008	118 / 14 / 1 / 4 / 1 / 3 / 2 / 147 / 25
2013	7 / 111 / 54 / 19 / 1 / 4 / 3 / 98 / 18
2018	4 / 53 / 112 / 1 / 3 / 9 / 57 / 58 / 18
2022	4 / 40 / 28 / 9 / 2 / 2 / 2 / 18 / 30 / 65

== Palazzo Madama ==
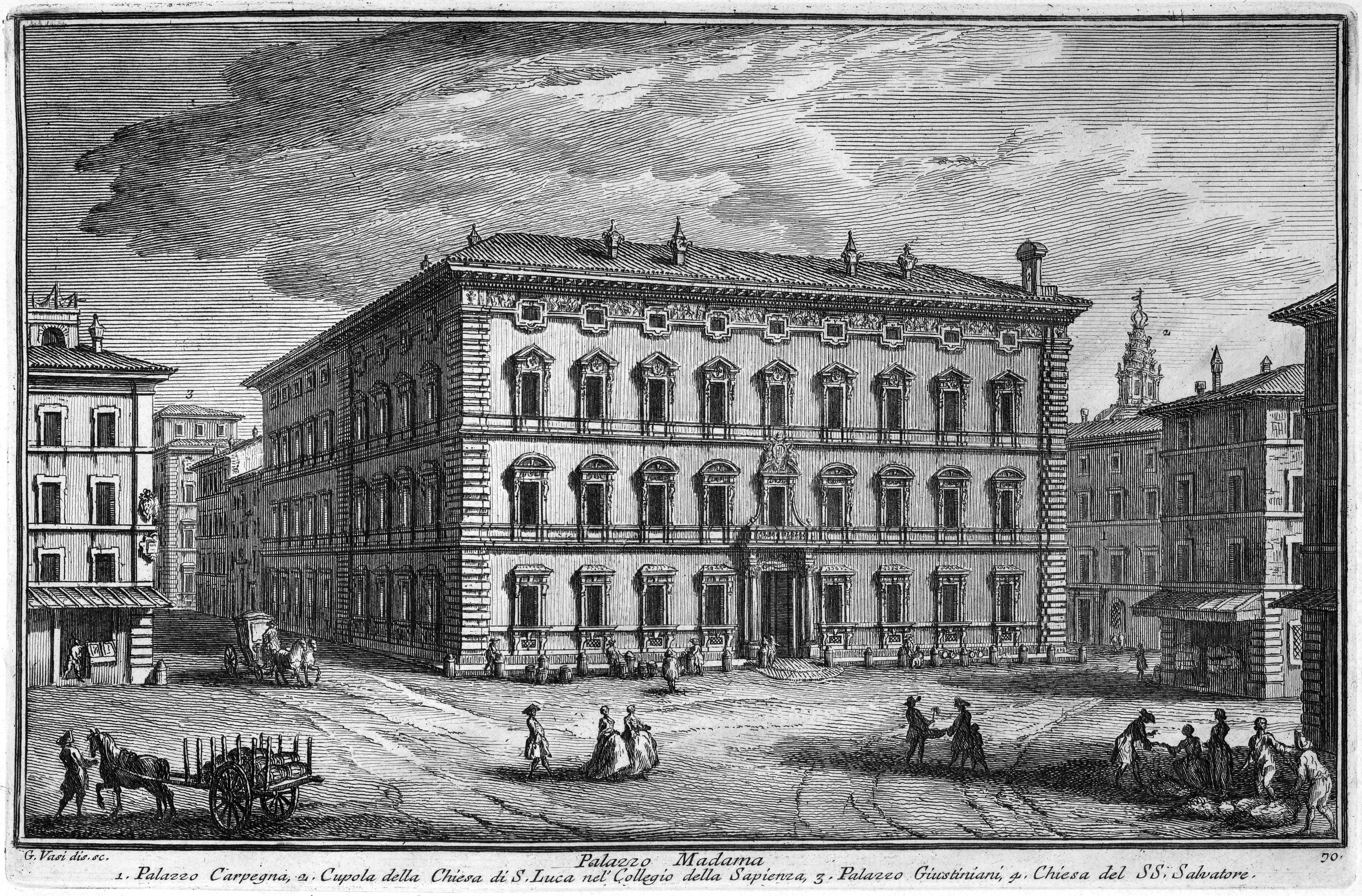
Palazzo Madama as it appeared in the 17th century

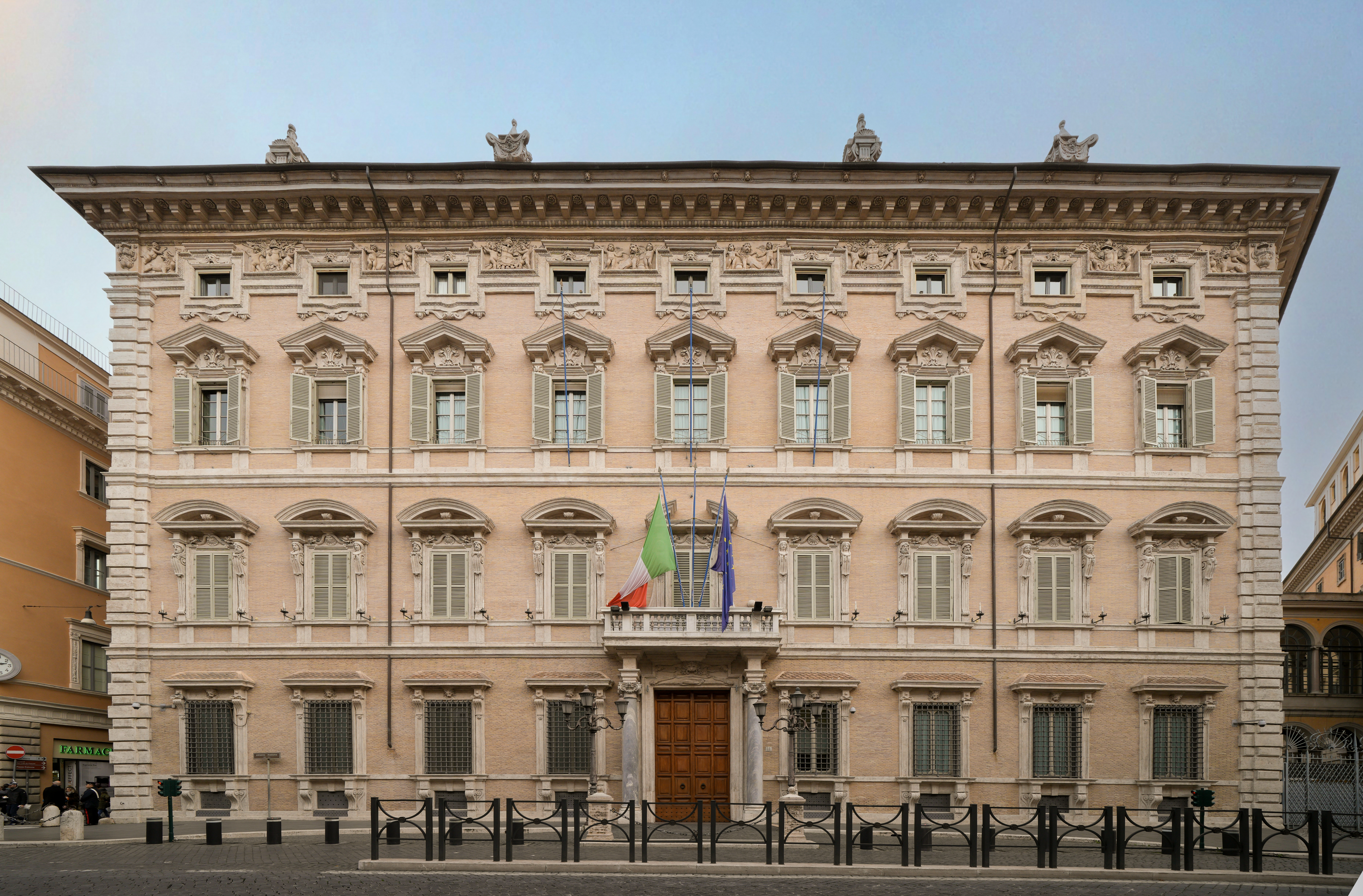
Palazzo Madama today

Since 1871, the Senate has met in Palazzo Madama in Rome, an old patrician palace completed in 1505 for the Medici family. The palace takes its name from Madama Margherita of Austria, daughter of Charles V and wife of Alessandro de' Medici. After the extinction of the Medici, the palace was handed over to the House of Lorraine. and, later, it was sold to Papal Government.

Later, in 1755, Pope Benedict XIV (whose coat of arms still dominates the main entrance) ordered major restructuring, entrusting the work to Luigi Hostini. In the following years there were installed the court offices and police headquarters. In 1849, Pius IX moved the Ministries of Finances and of the Public Debt here, as well as the Papal Post Offices. After the conquest of Rome by the newly formed Kingdom of Italy, the palace was chosen to become the seat of the Senato del Regno (Senate of the Kingdom).

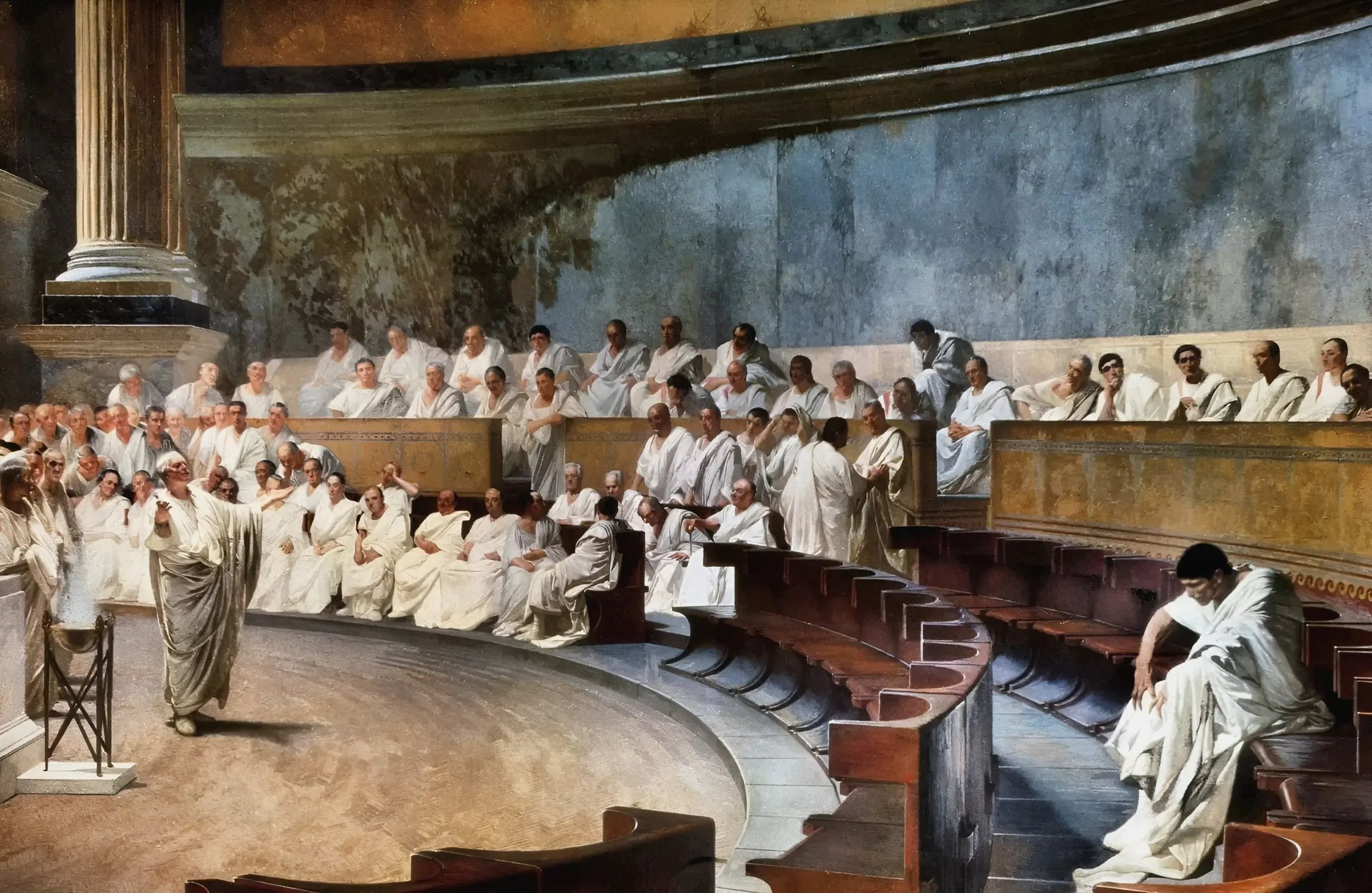
Cicero Denounces Catiline

Palazzo Madama and the adjacent buildings underwent further restructuring and adaptation in the first decades of the 20th century. A radical transformation which involved, among other things, the modernization of the hemicycle, the full remaking of the prospectus on Via San Salvatore and Via Dogana Vecchia, and the establishment of a connection with the adjacent Palazzo Carpegna. The latter, owned by the Senate, was entirely rebuilt in an advanced position compared to its original position. The small church of San Salvatore in Thermis, dating to the 6th century, which stood in the street to the left of the palace, was first closed, expropriated and later razed for security reasons.

The current façade was built in the mid-1650s by both Cigoli and Paolo Maruccelli. The latter added the ornate cornice and whimsical decorative urns on the roof. Among the rooms one of the most significant (and perhaps the most impressive from the political point of view) is the "Sala Maccari," which takes its name from Cesare Maccari, the artist who decorated it in 1880 and created the frescoes, among which stands out the one that depicts Cicero making his indictment of Catiline, who listens isolated.

The chamber where the Senate met for the first time on 27 November 1871 was designed by Luigi Gabet. A plaque on the wall behind the speaker's chair commemorates the king's address to Parliament when first convened in the new seat of government:

L'ITALIA È RESTITVITA A SE STESSA E A
ROMA • QVI E' DOVE NOI RICONOSCIAMO LA
PATRIA DEI NOSTRI PENSIERI; OGNI COSA
CI PARLA DI GRANDEZZA MA NEL TEMPO
STESSO OGNI COSA CI RICORDA I NOSTRI
DOVERI •
VITTORIO EMANVELE II
27 NOVEMBRE MDCCCLXXI
"Italy is restored to herself and to Rome... Here, where we recognise the homeland of our thoughts, all things speak to us of greatness; but at the same time all things remind us of our duties..." - Victor Emmanuel II, 27 November 1871

Above this has been placed a plaque bearing the inscription:

IL 2 GIUGNO 1946
PER SUFFRAGIO DI POPOLO
A PRESIDIO DI PUBBLICHE LIBERTÀ
E A CERTEZZA DI PROGRESSO CIVILE
FU PROCLAMATA
LA REPUBBLICA ITALIANA
On 2 June 1946
by popular suffrage
in defence of public liberty
and a certainty of civic progress
was proclaimed
the Italian Republic

To the viewers' left stand the flags of the Italian Republic (with a ribbon embroidered with the words SENATO DELLA REPUBBLICA) and the European Union.

== See also ==
- Parliament of Italy
- Italian Chamber of Deputies
- Senate
- Roman Senate
- Senato Italiano (TV channel)
- Senators for life in Italy
