= Aurora Floridia =

Italian politician (born 1967)

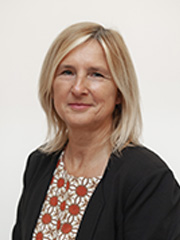
- Floridia in 2022

Member of the Senate
- Incumbent
- Assumed office 13 October 2022
- Constituency: Veneto – P02

Personal details
- Born: 6 May 1967 (age 59)
- Party: Green Europe (since 2021); Greens of South Tyrol (since 2025)

Aurora Floridia (born 6 May 1967) is an Italian politician serving as a member of the Senate since 2022. She has been a member of the Parliamentary Assembly of the Council of Europe since 2023. From 2019 to 2024, she was a municipal councillor of Malcesine.
