= Palazzo Madama, Rome =

Seat of the Senate of the Italian Republic

Palazzo Madama
- Senate of the Italian Republic
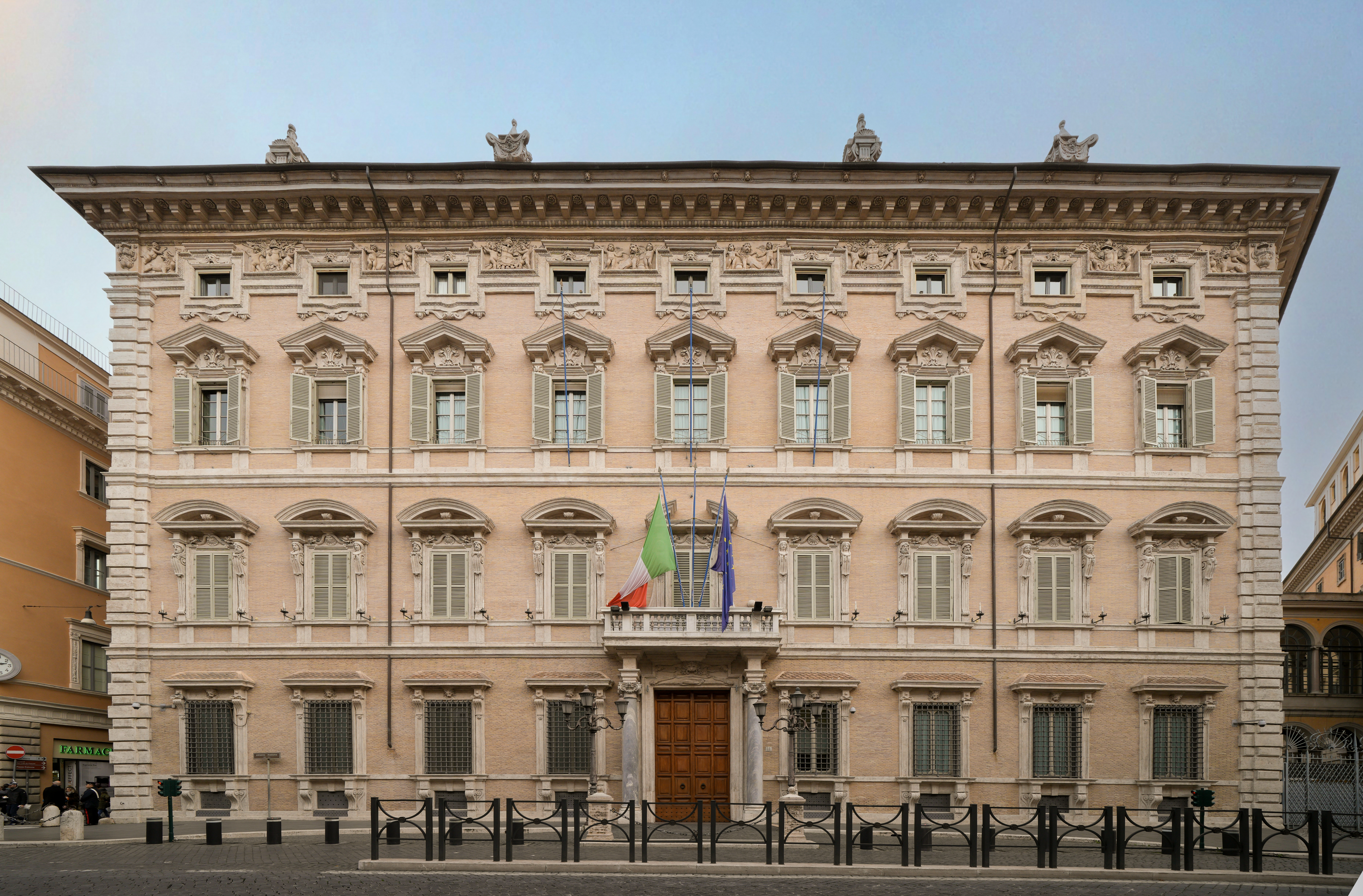
- Palazzo Madama, seat of the Italian Senate
- Click on the map for a fullscreen view

General information
- Location: Rome, Italy
- Coordinates: 41°53′57″N 12°28′27″E
- Construction started: Late 15th century
- Completed: 1505; 521 years ago
- Client: Medici Family

Palazzo Madama (pronounced [paˈlattso maˈdaːma]) in Rome is the seat of the Senate of the Italian Republic, the upper house of the Italian Parliament.

== See also ==
Some other Italian institutional buildings:

- Palazzo del Quirinale Seat of the President
- Palazzo Chigi Seat of the Prime Minister
- Palazzo Montecitorio Seat of the Italian Chamber of Deputies
- Palazzo della Consulta, seat of the Constitutional Court of Italy

Preceded by Lateran Palace	Landmarks of Rome; Palazzo Madama, Rome	Succeeded by Palazzo Malta
