= Aboubakar Soumahoro =

Ivorian-born Italian politician

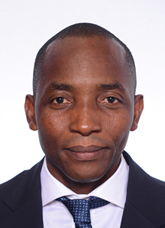
- Soumahoro in 2022

Member of the Chamber of Deputies
- Incumbent
- Assumed office 13 October 2022
- Constituency: Emilia-Romagna

Personal details
- Born: 6 June 1980 (age 46) Bétroulilié Lakota, Ivory Coast
- Party: Green and Left Alliance (until 2023); Independent (since 2023)
- Education: University of Naples Federico II
- Occupation: Trade unionist

Aboubakar Soumahoro (born 6 June 1980) is an Ivorian-born Italian politician, trade unionist and activist who is serving as a Member of the Chamber of Deputies for the Emilia-Romagna constituency since 2022.

He is known for his advocacy regarding labor rights of migrant farmers in Italy.

== Early life and education ==
Aboubakar Soumahoro was born in 1980 in Bétroulilié, Ivory Coast. He came to Italy in 1999, at the age of 19. He graduated from the University of Naples Federico II in 2010 with a degree in Sociology, earning a score of 110/110 with his thesis, titled “Social Analysis of the Labor Market: The Condition of Migrant Workers in the Italian Labor Market—Persistence and Changes”.

== Career ==
=== Political career ===
==== Member of the Chamber of Deputies ====
In the general elections of 2022, Green Europe offers Soumahoro the candidacy as an independent in the Chamber of Deputies in the context of the Greens and Left Alliance list. Soumahoro is a candidate in the single-member constituency of Modena for the centre-left, obtaining 36.01% and being unexpectedly defeated by the centre-right candidate Daniela Dondi (37.44%). Thanks to further candidacies as leaders of Greens and Lef Alliance in the multi-nominal constituencies Veneto 1 - 01, Apulia 02, Lombardy 1 - 01, Emilia Romagna 02, he was elected in the last three and was assigned, according to the electoral law, to the latter.

Following administrative irregularities that have occurred in the cooperatives managed by his mother-in-law and his partner and the launch of judicial investigations by the Latina Public Prosecutor's Office, on 24 November 2022 Soumahoro decided to suspend himself from the parliamentary group of the Greens and Left Alliance, in order to clarify his position, reaffirming his extraneousness to the whole affair.

On 9 January 2023 Soumahoro left the Green-Left Alliance, citing lack of solidarity and unwillingness to politically help him during the investigation.

== Electoral history ==
2022 Italian general election
Constituency	Party	Electoral list	Votes	Result	Ref
Emilia-Romagna	Independent	AVS	Elected via Proportional list	Elected	

== Bibliography ==
- Aboubakar Soumahoro (2019). Feltrinelli (ed.). Umanità in rivolta: La nostra lotta per il lavoro e il diritto alla felicità [Humanity in Revolt: Our Fight for Work and the Right to Happiness]. ISBN 88-071-7355-7.
