= Mario Borghese =

Italian politician

Mario Alejandro Borghese
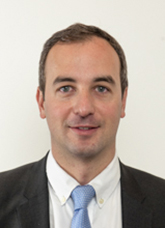
- Borghese in 2018

Senator of the Italian Republic
- Incumbent
- Assumed office October 13, 2022
- President: Sergio Mattarella
- Prime Minister: Mario Draghi (until 22 October 2022); Giorgia Meloni (from 22 October 2022)
- Preceded by: Ricardo Merlo
- Parliamentary group: Civics of Italy
- Constituency: Italian: America Meridionale (South America)
- In office March 15, 2013 – October 12, 2022
- President: Giorgio Napolitano (until 14 January 2015); Pietro Grasso (14 January 2015 – 3 February 2015) (Note: Interim president); Sergio Mattarella (from 3 February 2015)
- Prime Minister: Mario Monti (until 28 April 2013); Enrico Letta (28 April 2013 – 22 February 2014); Matteo Renzi (22 February 2014 – 12 December 2016); Paolo Gentiloni (12 December 2016 – 1 June 2018); Giuseppe Conte (1 June 2018 – 13 February 2021); Mario Draghi (from 13 February 2021)
- Parliamentary group: Liberal Popular Alliance/MAIE (until 13 October 2016); Us with Italy/Civic Choice/MAIE (13 October 2016 – 22 March 2018); MAIE/Sono Italia (22 March 2018 – 18 February 2019); MAIE/Non iscritti (18 February 2019 – 19 February 2019); Facciamo ECO/Italian Socialist Party/MAIE (19 February 2019 – 7 July 2022); MAIE/Coraggio Italia (from 7 July 2022)
- Constituency: Italian: America Meridionale (South America)

Personal details
- Born: April 14, 1981 (age 45) Córdoba, Argentina

Mario Alejandro Borghese is an Italian politician. He is currently serving as a Senator of the Italian Republic after previously serving in the Chamber of Deputies. He represents Italians abroad in South America.
