= Civic Project Italy =

Political party in Italy

Civic Project Italy Progetto Civico Italia
- Leader: Alessandro Onorato
- President: Ismaele La Vardera
- Founded: 20 October 2025
- Membership (2026): 12,000
- Ideology: Reformism; Regionalism; Civism
- Political position: Centre
- National affiliation: Centre-left coalition
- Colors: Blue Red
- Chamber of Deputies: 0 / 400
- Senate: 0 / 205
- European Parliament: 0 / 76
- Regional Councils: 8 / 896

Website
- www.progettocivicoitalia.it

Civic Project Italy (Italian: Progetto Civico Italia, PCI) is a reformist, regionalist and centrist political party in Italy led by Alessandro Onorato.

== History ==
On 20 October, Alessandro Onorato, municipal councillor for Tourism and Sport in Rome and coordinator of the civic list Gualtieri for Mayor at the 2021 Rome municipal election, unveiled the new political project, with the goal of creating a movement made up of local politicians elected through civic lists within the centre-left coalition. The initiative was established with the aim of bringing together local civic movements, mayors, councillors, and other local administrators under a common political project inspired by reformism, administrative pragmatism and territorial representation.

During its first months, the movement expanded across Italy through the creation of regional and local coordinations, attracting hundreds of civic lists and local administrators. On 5 December, Vincenzo Paldino, a regional councillor in Emilia-Romagna, joined the movement, becoming its first regional councillor.

On 12 June 2026, during the first national assembly of PCI, the movement elected a national direction of 120 members. Speaking at the event, Onorato described the party as a progressive, reformist, and popular political force rooted in local government, intended to represent civic administrators within the Italian centre-left. According to the party, it brought together around 685 local administrators, 400 civic committees and approximately 10,000 members at the time of its foundation. On 30 July 2026, the Sicilian regionalist party ControCorrente joined PCI. As part of the agreement, its leader Ismaele La Vardera was appointed national president of the party. On 11 August, Abruzzo regional councillor Vincenzo Menna joined the party. On 17 September, Civic Pact Movement for Lombardy and its Lombard regional councillor Michela Palestra joined the party. On 9 October, Campanian regional councillor Giovanni Porcelli joined the party.

In October 2026, senator Luigi Nave left the Five Star Movement's parliamentary group (while remaining a member of M5S) and joined the Mixed Group in the Senate, where he created the component "Avanti PSI" ("Forward PSI", connected to the Italian Socialist Party), which was later renamed "Avanti PSI - Progetto Civico Italia" ("Forward PSI - Civic Project Italy"). The move aimed to allow the PSI and Civic Project Italy to run in the next general elections by reducing the signatures required to be on the ballot.

== See also ==
- List of political parties in Italy
