= Luigi Nave =

Italian politician (born 1970)

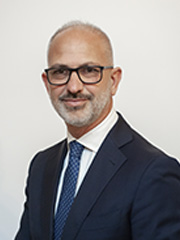
- Nave in 2022

Member of the Senate
- Incumbent
- Assumed office 13 October 2022
- Constituency: Campania – P01

Personal details
- Born: 13 May 1970 (age 56) Villaricca, Italy
- Party: Five Star Movement
- Education: Pegaso University
- Profession: Teacher

Luigi Nave (born 13 May 1970) is an Italian politician serving as a member of the Senate since 2022. From 2016 to 2021, he was a municipal councillor of Villaricca.

== Biography ==
A graduate in Safety Engineering and an activist with the Five Star Movement (M5S) since 2012, he ran for mayor of Villaricca in the 2016 municipal elections in Campania, receiving 9.56% of the vote and being elected to the city council. On December 3, 2020, he was elected to the Metropolitan City of Naples as a replacement for Gennaro Cozzolino.

From 2019 to 2021, he served as a parliamentary assistant at the European Parliament.

In the 2021 local elections, he ran for the Naples City Council on the M5S lists in support of List of mayors of Naples candidate Gaetano Manfredi, receiving 0.64% of the vote and failing to win a seat.

In the 2022 early general elections, he ran for the Senate of the Republic (Italy), appearing in second place on the Five Star Movement’s list in the Campania 1 multi-member district, and was elected to the Senate. During the 19th legislature, he served as secretary of the M5S parliamentary group in the Senate, as well as a member of the 9th Committee on Industry, Commerce, Tourism, Agriculture, and Agri-Food Production, the Parliamentary Anti-Mafia Committee, and the Parliamentary Commission of Inquiry into the disappearances of Disappearance of Emanuela Orlandi and Disappearance of Mirella Gregori.
