= 2024 European Parliament election in Piedmont =

The 2024 European Parliament election in Italy took place on 8–9 June 2024. In Piedmont, the ruling Brothers of Italy came first (30.4%), followed by the Democratic Party (23.0%) and the League (10.3%), which reflected its status among the Italian regions closest to the national vote. Similarly, Turin, a major Italian city and capital of Piedmont, reflected its status as a centre-left coalition stronghold, with the Democratic Party as the largest party (29.8%) and a large majority for the parliamentary opposition and left-leaning parties (62.7%). Voter turnout was slightly above the national one, which saw a sharp decline. Ultimately, only one Piedmontese was elected to the European Parliament.

== Results ==
=== Overall ===
Reflecting its status as a relatively swing region fairly close to the national results, Brothers of Italy came first with 30.4% of the votes, followed by the Democratic Party (23.0%) and the League (10.3%), represented by the Piedmont League in the region. Under double digits were the electoral list of Forza Italia and Us Moderates (9.9%), the Five Star Movement (8.0%), and the Greens and Left Alliance (7.5%). Below the national electoral threshold of 4% were United States of Europe (3.9%), Action (3.2%), Peace Land Dignity (2.3%), Freedom (0.9%), Popular Alternative (0.4%), and Valdostan Rally (0.2%). Overall, the turnout was in line with the national one, which represented the lowest in the history of the European Parliament elections in Italy and was under 50%.

While in 2019 the region of Piedmont elected three members of the European Parliament, this was reduced to one in 2024. Giovanni Crosetto of Brothers of Italy, a member of the liberal wing and critic of apology of fascism (for example condemning the commemorations of the Acca Larentia killings with the fascist salute) who is the nephew of the defence minister Guido Crosetto, was elected with around 34,000 preferential votes in the North-East Italy constituency, of which 19,643 in Piedmont.

=== Turin ===
In Turin, in line with the city's political leanings, the parliamentary opposition and left-leaning parties of the Progressive Camp represented a large majority at around 60% of the votes as the Democratic Party was first with 29.8% of the votes, followed by Brothers of Italy (22.0%) and the Greens and Left Alliance (11.7%) in double digits. Next were the Five Star Movement (8.8%), Forza Italia (8.2%), the League (5.6%), the United States of Europe (5.2%), and Action (4.1%). Under the 4% threshold were Peace Land Dignity (2.9%), Freedom (0.8%), Popular Alternative (0.3%), and Valdostan Rally (0.1%). In total, there were 347,799 votes in Turin, with a turnout of 52.1%, slightly above the national turnout (48.3%) and a sharp drop compared to the 2022 Italian general election in the city (64.58%) and also decreased compared to the 2019 European Parliament election in Italy, when the turnout in the city had stood at 60.9%.

Party	Votes	%
Brothers of Italy	569,893	30.4
Democratic Party	429,682	23.0
League	192,757	10.3
Forza Italia–Us Moderates	185,385	9.9
Five Star Movement	149,809	8.0
Greens and Left Alliance	140,816	7.5
United States of Europe	72,342	3.9
Action	60,340	3.2
Peace Land Dignity	42,364	2.3
Freedom	17,150	0.9
Popular Alternative	7,435	0.4
Valdostan Rally	3,961	0.2
Total	1,871,934	100.00

Source: Ministry of the Interior

== See also ==
- 2024 European Parliament election in Lombardy
