= Guido Crosetto =

Italian politician and businessman (born 1963)

The Right Honourable Guido Crosetto
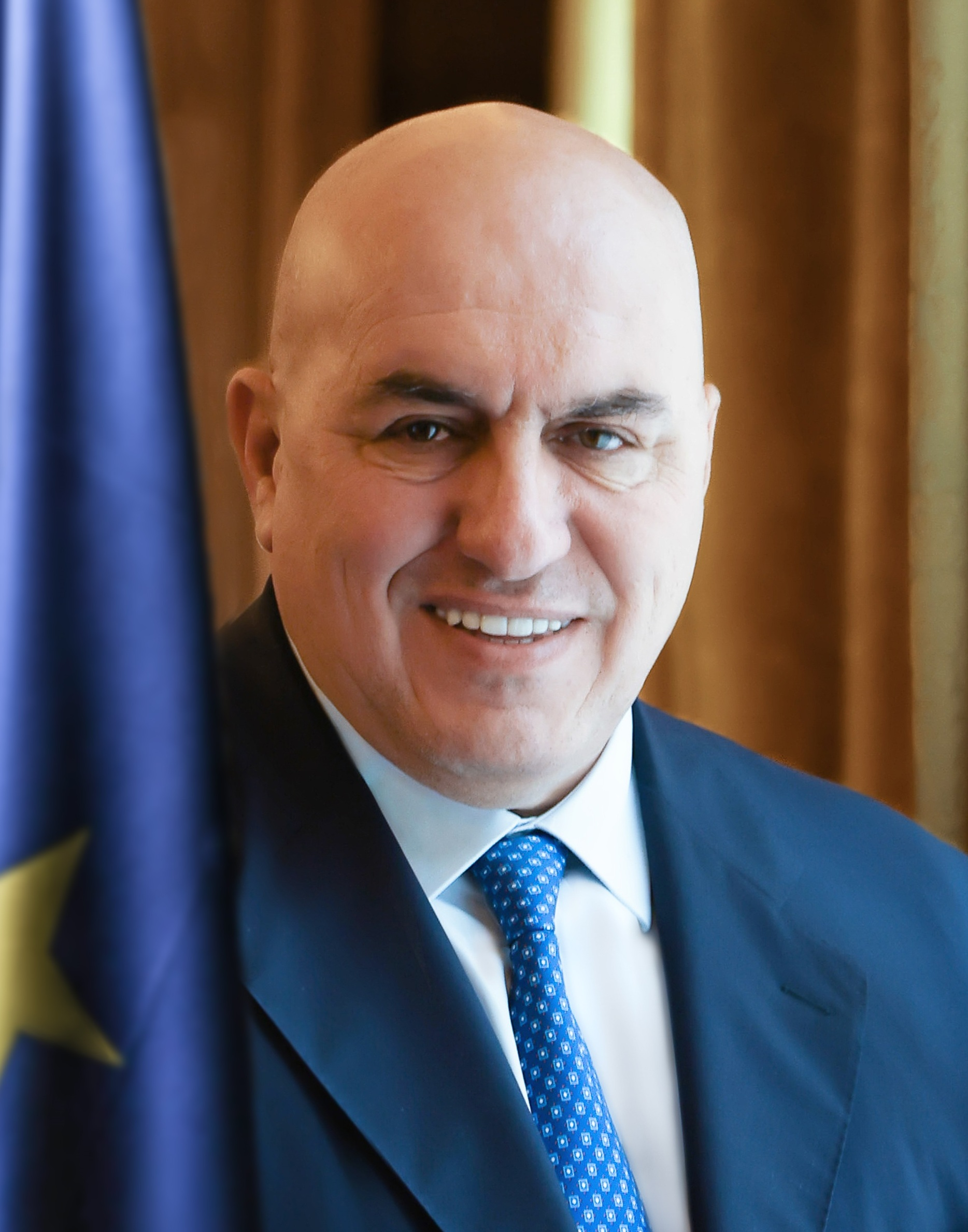
- Official portrait, 2022

Minister of Defence
- Incumbent
- Assumed office 22 October 2022
- Prime Minister: Giorgia Meloni
- Preceded by: Lorenzo Guerini

Member of the Chamber of Deputies
- In office 23 March 2018 – 13 March 2019 (Note: Resigned from office)
- Constituency: Lombardy
- In office 30 May 2001 – 14 March 2013
- Constituency: Piedmont

Mayor of Marene
- In office 28 May 1990 – 14 June 2004
- Preceded by: Paolo Lampertico
- Succeeded by: Edoardo Giuseppe Pelissero

Personal details
- Born: 19 September 1963 (age 63) Cuneo, Italy
- Party: DC (1985–1994); FI (2000–2009); PdL (2009–2012); FdI (since 2012)
- Spouse: Gaia Saponaro
- Children: 3
- Relatives: Giovanni Crosetto (nephew)
- Profession: Businessman; politician

Guido Crosetto (born 19 September 1963) is an Italian politician and businessman who is the Minister of Defence since 22 October 2022. Born in Cuneo, he grew up into a family involved in agriculture and construction, and later took over the family business. Crosetto began his political career in Christian Democracy (DC) and was mainly involved in the local politics of Piedmont. From 1990 to 2004, he was mayor of Marene. In 2000, he joined Forza Italia (FI). His rise in national politics began with his election to the Chamber of Deputies in 2001, a position he held until 2013 and from 2018 to 2019. In 2009, Crosetto joined The People of Freedom (PdL) and served as an undersecretary at the Ministry of Defence in the fourth Berlusconi government from 2008 to 2011. In 2012, Crosetto was among the founders (alongside Giorgia Meloni and Ignazio La Russa) of Brothers of Italy (FdI), of which he served as national coordinator from 2013 to 2014 and from 2018 to 2019, representing its moderate wing.

After leaving electoral politics in 2014, Crosetto returned to the Chamber of Deputies in 2018 and again served as national coordinator of FdI. He resigned from Italian Parliament in 2019 to focus on his business career, while remaining a close adviser to Meloni and an influential figure within the party. He was widely regarded as part of FdI's moderate wing and advocated its development into a broad conservative party rather than a narrowly right-wing movement. Crosetto was active in the Italian defence industry, serving as president of the Federation of Italian Companies for Aerospace, Defence and Security (AIAD), senior adviser to Leonardo, and chairman of Orizzonte Sistemi Navali. In 2022, he became Minister of Defence in the Meloni government. Before becoming defence minister, he resigned from his private-sector positions and divested himself of his business interests to address potential conflicts of interest.

Crosetto identifies as an anti-fascist, despite being a co-founder of FdI, and has condemned fascist symbolism and commemorations within the political right. He has also advocated a more moderate and Christian-democratic approach to conservatism and greater European integration. In foreign policy, he has argued that Europe must strengthen its political, economic, and military capabilities to reduce its dependence on the United States, while maintaining support for Atlanticism. He has described the growing strategic competition between the United States and China as a defining feature of international politics, and has criticised Italy's participation in the Belt and Road Initiative, while calling for a pragmatic approach to relations with major powers.

As Minister of Defence, Crosetto has been a prominent supporter of Ukraine and of increased European defence cooperation, while advocating the modernisation of the Italian Armed Forces and higher defence spending. He has also taken independent positions on international affairs, supporting a two-state solution to the Israeli–Palestinian conflict while becoming increasingly critical of Israel's conduct in Gaza. In 2026, following the outbreak of war involving Iran, he criticised the United States and Israeli military intervention and warned of the risk of wider escalation, while supporting the deployment of Italian air-defence capabilities to Gulf states. He has argued for a stronger and more integrated European defence policy and for greater European strategic autonomy, while maintaining Italy's commitments to NATO and its existing alliances.

== Early life ==
=== Family and business ===
Crosetto was born into a family of agricultural entrepreneurs in Cuneo, the capital city of the province of Cuneo in the Italian region of Piedmont, on 19 September 1963. In addition to Cuneo, he grew up in Alba, calling himself "a children of the province of Granda", and Marene. At a young age, Crosetto took over the family business, which produced agricultural machinery, later expanding his business to other sectors, including real estate and tourism. The business was known as Agrimec, before it was renamed to Crosetto as a private limited company, and produced agricultural trailers since 1937, before its expansion to other sectors. Both Crosetto's father and grandfather were entrepreneurs who built agricultural machineries, leading to an agro-mechanical dynasty that Crosetto dates back to the 1870s. One of his father's maxim was "The same one the family began with, a century earlier: 'The more expensive, the better'", adding that for his family, "machines weren't tools but works of art". His mother's maxim was "The only thing that matters is loving each other. Everything else will sort itself out".

Of his childhood, Crosetto said: "Anyone who knows the Po Valley knows that raising pigs and cows fills the air with the smell of manure. When I told my father, 'It stinks,' he replied, 'Shut up, because this smell will feed you.' We produced agricultural machinery, including manure spreaders, so it was doubly true for us." He grew up "playing and jumping in the sheds among our jewels", such as trailers, manure spreader wagons, and even the manure spreader, without which he said "one wouldn't eat fruit and vegetables, you know". His Proustian moment was "the smell of iron", which Crosetto said it made him "feel at home." During his teens, Crosetto went to the workshop, wearing the mandatory blue overalls as a blue-collar worker; he explained that he suffers from premature baldness and that his hair was already receding at twenty. In 2022, he recalled: "Like all the sons in the family, before the law prohibited it, from the age of 15 I was sent to the workshop every summer for a month to work." He expressed pride in this, saying that he can "immodestly give anyone points for iron cutting and welding" and added: "I can weld with electrodes, with continuous wire, or even with a blowtorch. With a blowtorch—you know it's a very difficult job—I'd put on my visor and give it my all." He had no weekly or monthly allowance, and said that he borrowed money from his father and paid it back in a month by playing on the stock market, saying that to find, buy, and sell companies is what he has done all his life.

While his mother was a Christian democrat, his father was liberal who—according to Crosetto—despised the DC almost more than the Italian Communist Party (PCI) and said the DC was the symbol of "statism and inefficiency". In the office of Crosetto's father who—instead of studying law as he would have liked—began working in the family business at 15, there hung a quote from the liberal Luigi Einaudi. (Note: «Migliaia, milioni di individui lavorano, producono e risparmiano nonostante tutto quello che noi possiamo inventare per molestarli, incepparli, scoraggiarli. È la vocazione naturale che li spinge, non soltanto la sete di denaro. Il gusto, l'orgoglio di vedere la propria azienda prosperare, acquistare credito, ispirare fiducia a clientele sempre più vaste, ampliare gli impianti, abbellire le sedi, costituiscono una molla di progresso altrettanto potente che il guadagno. Se così non fosse, non si spiegherebbe come ci siano imprenditori che nella propria azienda prodigano tutte le loro energie e investono tutti i loro capitali per ritrarre spesso utili di gran lunga più modesti di quelli che potrebbero sicuramente e comodamente ottenere con altri impieghi». — Italian original of Einaudi's quote "Thousands, millions of individuals work, produce, and save despite everything we can invent to harass them, hinder them, and discourage them. It's their natural calling that drives them, not just the thirst for money. The joy and pride of seeing their company prosper, gain credit, inspire trust in an ever-growing customer base, expand their facilities, and beautify their offices—these are a driving force for progress just as powerful as profit. If this were not the case, it would be inexplicable how there are entrepreneurs who pour all their energy and capital into their businesses, often to achieve profits far more modest than those they could certainly and comfortably obtain with other endeavors." — English translation of Einaudi's quote) He described him as "a good father with little time" and said that he lost him "too soon". When this occurred, Crosetto was in his early 20s and he later described himself during this time as "an idiot, like all the boys that age, who only thought about partying and having fun". During the 1970s, Crosetto recalled that he mourned Olivia Newton-Jones "like someone burying a legend from her youth" and that he enjoyed dancing in what was the dawn of disco music, and was more at the disco than at the political section of a party. Of this era, he cited the first strobe lights, the 1977 dance drama Saturday Night Fever and the 1978 musical romantic comedy film Grease, and the Bee Gees. He often took his father's car, a beige Citroën DS, eventually leading his father to buy him an Audi.

=== Father's death and aftermath ===
In 2022, Crosetto described the day his father "brutal and unexpected diagnosis" of a tumor with zero hope of survival as "a punch in the face, cold". His father would die 12 months later, exactly as the doctors had predicted. This caused him to become the de facto head of the family when he "wasn't a man yet: I had to become one, accompanying my father through an endless and painful year of agony." Of the day after the funeral, he recalled: "My mother—an extraordinary woman—had never worked in a company. I thought, in an imaginary dialogue with him: 'You were the one who held everything together. Now what do I do?'" Crosetto said that he "struggled a lot", as he also had to change jobs, but in the end "managed to get back on [his] feet, and that was survival", before adding: "The suffering of such a terrible loss stays with you for a lifetime."

Of his father's death, which occurred following a botched operation, Crosetto recalled in 2025 "the hellish diagnosis" contained in the medical report, stating: "One day I came home and found my mother waiting for me in the entrance hall. A kiss, a hug, then she dragged me into the living room. On the table were some chest X-rays and a medical report. 'What do you think it means?' she asked me. From there, a sort of desperate race began, made of the desperation that goes beyond the limits of rationality and typical of those who seek hope even in places they wouldn't normally go. There's a Turk who claims to have a miracle machine? Take your father and go to the Turk. You hear that there's someone who can heal anything with his hands? Take your father and drag him there." He also described his father's surgery and the aftermath thusly: "They operated on him, twelve hours of surgery, and afterward he seemed almost on the verge of recovery. Then complications arose. A nurse, moved by compassion, confessed to me almost in tears that in their haste to open and close it, they had forgotten some gauze inside, which had caused an infection." He recalled his father's last moments, stating that he "closed himself in the most impenetrable silence" and "never asked anything", concluding: "When it happened, I was there beside him: a breath, another breath, another breath, then silence, silence, silence. I touched him, I looked at him, I started crying and screaming 'Mom, Mom!' Like a child."

In an interview with Gianni Pittella and his wife, Agata Pittella, Crosetto recalled of his early life and family business, stating: "I feel gratified by what life has given me, even though I must say I had to earn it tooth and nail, starting at a young age after my father's death, having to climb ever higher mountains alone. However, I did it without even realising the difficulty of what I was doing, and I did it because I always thought I was following a path that wouldn't just benefit me, but could also improve everything around me: be it a municipality, a province, a region, or a nation." He added: "I don't feel capable of teaching anything or imparting messages; I can only tell you how I lived my life. Life. I lived it without fear: without fear of working, without fear of sacrificing myself, without fear of taking risks, without fear of showing my weaknesses and without fear of even sometimes showing my incompetence." In 2025, Crosetto recalled that he did not immediately take his father's place in the family agricultural machinery business, stating: "My uncle paid us off. The Civil Code allowed him to, and he did. We were forced to start from scratch. We had enough to eat, of course. But it was very difficult." Earlier in 2022, he said that one of his best investments was when he found a truck driver who had the idea of making livestock products from expired croissants, describing it as "one of the smartest and most profitable ideas of my life". On the other hand, one of his worst investments Nava, failed helmet company that he wanted to revive it by taking over the brand. Describing it as "the biggest mistake of my life", he hired a manager and lost a few million euros, and he ultimately closed it down.

=== Education ===
After finishing high school in Savigliano, graduating with a diploma from the classical lyceum named after Giuseppe Arimondi, Crosetto attended the Faculty of Economics and Commerce at the University of Turin between 1982 and 1987 but never graduated following his father's death, and could not finish his studies in Economics and Business at the University of Turin. He decided to left university to start a political career and joined the youth wing of the DC.

Of his high-school years, Crosetto said that there was "an old-fashioned principal" and added: "You don't know how grateful I am to those teachers. I only attended public schools, and I had excellent honours. Then I majored in economics. But I dropped out because of my dad's illness." He also said that he was class and school president but was apolitical. During his time at the University of Turin, Crosetto met future politician Paolo Rosso. In the past, the official website of the Chamber of Deputies and the Italian Wikipedia wrongly reported that Crosetto had completed his studies and had a degree (laurea). In 2013, he said that he had been silly for having told a "little, innocent lie".

== Political career ==
=== Early political career ===
==== Christian Democracy ====
During the 1980s, Crosetto became more active politically in the Christian-democratic mold of his mother. He said that he chose the DC because of Igino Trisoglio, a priest from the congregation of the Brothers of the Christian Schools, who ran the university hostel, and added that he owed him "everything" in terms of politics. Crosetto said that Trisoglio did not draw him to the DC with philosophical references to Christian values, but rather "pinned me against a wall and said, 'Guido, you have to go into politics. You were born for this.'" Crosetto began his political career as a member and regional secretary of the youth wing of the DC, and in 1988, at age 25, he became the economic advisor to Giovanni Goria, who at that time was Prime Minister of Italy. He was a member of the DC's left-wing like fellow Piedmontese Fabrizio Palenzona.

As a result of his early political rise and member of DC, among those who distinguishing themselves for their political aggressiveness, ambition, and the energy with which they rose to the party's top ranks, Crosetto is referred to as a former "young Christian Democrat lion". Besides Goria, he also worked with Ciriaco De Mita (Prime Minister between 1988 and 1989), Guido Bodrato, and Carlo Donat-Cattin. According to Crosetto, he did not act as Goria's briefcase carrier and worked with him pro bono, saying that he "learned from him the importance of a good nose for understanding economic changes: the famous 'nasometry', which Goria always talked about." As key figures during this period, Crosetto cited Enrico Letta (Prime Minister between 2013 and 2014), Dario Franceschini (future minister), Lapo Pistelli (future deputy), Simone Guerrini (political advisor to Sergio Mattarella), and Renato Negro (one of Crosetto's best friends and future CEO of a major multinational).

==== Mani pulite ====
During the 1990s, with the fall of the First Italian Republic and its ruling parties, including the DC in 1994, Crosetto was a critic of the Mani pulite judges in the Tangentopoli scandal. In his 2025 autobiography, Crosetto recalled that "the rift between law and jurisprudence began: it doesn't matter what the code provides, what the law says, but what a judge thinks and how he decides to interpret the law at his own discretion. This extremely dangerous trend still leads to convictions for invented crimes ... A true disgrace to the law. The fact remains that, at that time, the judiciary also became a key player in the selection of the Italian business class."

Crosetto clarified that he respected most of magistrates but that he looked at the data, saying: "The figures on compensation for wrongful imprisonment from 1992 to today show that in Italy, every day, ten innocent people are arrested and sent to prison." He said that anyone who holds power should be free to exercise it but only within the limits of the Constitution. He expressed his concerns "when power becomes omnipotent", saying that some magistrates, explaining that they are "few but very powerful", interpret "their profession as if it were limitless. Some of them have invaded the space of others to produce political consequences". He wrote that the billionaire media tycoon and Prime Minister Silvio Berlusconi, Prime Minister Bettino Craxi of the Italian Socialist Party (PSI), and Prime Minister Matteo Renzi of the Democratic Party (PD) were "the politicians most persecuted" by the Italian judiciary and added: "I don't just defend my own, as some do. And I always wait for the day when someone will take the trouble to compare the income declared over the decades by members of this country's ruling class with the assets, both movable and immovable, they have accumulated. Let them start with mine." He concluded that during the scandal some were not "even touched by the investigations", clarifying that he was not referring only to the post-communists.

==== Mayor of Marene ====
In 1990, Crosetto was elected mayor of Marene, a small village near Cuneo where he lives, by the city council as an independent candidate within the civic list Together for Marene, which he founded. Re-elected in 1995 and 1999 with the support of the centre-right coalition, he served for three terms from 28 May 1990 to 14 June 2004. (Note: In the comune of Marene, the office of mayor (sindaco) before 1995 was elected by the city council (indirect election) without term limits. After 1995, the mayor began to be elected by citizen (direct election) with term limits (only two consecutive terms). Before 1995, the term of the mayor of Marene was five years, and from 1995 to 1999 was four years; after 1999, the term became five years.) Crosetto's civic list proved successful in the following years, electing as mayors Edoardo Pelissero and Roberta Barbero. In 2022, Crosetto said of his time as mayor: "First I bought the Town Hall. And then I redid everything, from the football fields to the square, to the social services." In 2025, he said that his experience as mayor made him understood the meaning of institutions, citing a key episode less than a week after he was elected where at local bar client stood up and took off his hat. This made Crosetto realise that "I had stopped being Guido, Giovanni's son, because I had become the mayor." Another episode concerned a farmer from the town hall, who told Crosetto about his five-year-old daughter who—while playing in their farmhouse—wandered off a few dozen meters until she came across a prostitute engaged in a relationship with a client and was so traumatized she stopped speaking. Within four days, also citing "a very complicated ordinance", the first of its kind in Italy, prostitutes were removed from Marene. After this, while walking into the bar, a customer told Crosetto: "Thank you, you took away the only good thing that was in Marene." This episode made Crosetto realise that "it's not possible, in politics, to do something that suits everyone".

Crosetto had met Berlusconi prior to his politician career and that he only met again in the late 1990s, when he was asked to be their candidate for the president of the province of Cuneo. When Berlusconi entered politics in 1994, Crosetto recalled in a March 2025 interview on Un giorno da pecora broadcast on Rai Radio 1 that he felt disorientation, stating: "I watched Berlusconi on television, his songs, his flags, his blue backgrounds: it's no secret, I felt contempt, I was almost offended, outraged. That was because for me, politics wasn't about the little song or the badge, but about content and ideas." He also said that he certain that it was a revolution and that it would be successful. He added: "Years later, thanks to Roberto Rosso, the same person who had convinced me to join the DC as a boy, I was elected to Montecitorio with Forza Italia. But I had to face Claudio Scajola's threats head on." Around 1994, Crosetto was also one of the founders of the cultural cooperative called Zabum in Cuneo, where notable artists grew up, including Africa Unite, Antonio Albanese, Claudio Bisio, Marlene Kuntz, Mau Mau, and Subsonica. He joked that he was the only one to never smoke a joint. In 1999, Crosetto ran for the presidency of the province of Cuneo as an independent candidate close to the centre-right coalition but lost to the centre-left coalition fellow former DC member Giovanni Quaglia. He was provincial councilor of Cuneo from 1999 to 2009, serving as group leader of FI, the centre-right political party founded by Berlusconi and member of the European People's Party (EPP). He had joined FI in 2000, and also chaired the Conference of Mayors of the Savigliano-Saluzzo-Fossano ASL from 1993 to 1997.

=== Chamber of Deputies ===
==== Election and roles ====
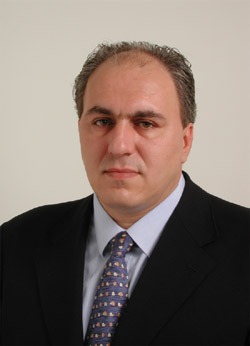
Crosetto as a member of the Chamber of Deputies in 2001

In the 2001 Italian general election, Crosetto was elected to the Chamber of Deputies under FI for the single-member district of Alba, Piedmont, gaining 49% of votes, and was re-elected in subsequent years. From 2001 to 2006, he served on a series of parliamentary committees, including the Permanent Committee on Budget, Treasury, and Planning, the Committee of Inquiry into the Serbian Telekom Affair, the Committee for the General Direction and Oversight of Radio and Television Services, and the Committee for the Oversight of Deposits and Loans Fund. Crosetto was first re-elected in the 2006 Italian general election. From 2003 to 2009, he was the Piedmont regional coordinator for FI and the party's national director for credit and industry until the founding of the PdL.

In 2022, Crosetto described the budget committee as a "great training on public spending", stating that he learned a lot from it. In 2025, he recalled an episode where he argued at 3 a.m. in the Chamber of Deputies with the then Deputy Minister of Economy Giuseppe Vegas of FI because he had rejected an amendment that recognised the chemical risk of exposure to chlorine, nitro, and amines at ACNA. The argument was so furious that Crosetto collapsed on the floor and was rushed to the emergency room at San Giacomo, near Montecitorio. The next day, the then Undersecretary of State for the Ministry of Economy and Finance, his friend Maria Teresa Armosino, greeted him outside the hospital, hugged him, and told him: "Don't worry, tomorrow I'll give my opinion and change Vegas's."

==== Fourth Berlusconi government ====
For the 2008 Italian general election, Crosetto joined Berlusconi's new party, the PdL, with which he was elected again to the Chamber of Deputies. He served as Undersecretary of State at the Ministry of Defence in the fourth and final Berlusconi government from 2008 to 2011. After completing his term as undersecretary, Crosetto was appointed to the Committee on Foreign and European Affairs and subsequently to the Committee on Budget, Treasury, and Planning. In October 2012, due to incompatibility with his parliamentarian role, he resigned as president of GEAC, the company managing the Cuneo International Airport. On 14 November 2012, he was awarded the Gold Medal of Merit of the Italian Red Cross.

In June 2010, Crosetto proposed a Progetto Energia aimed at making sites available for photovoltaic installations. In June 2011, he stated that the 2011 military intervention in Libya had cost Italy €150 million. Later that month, Crosetto accused Giulio Tremonti, the then Minister of Economy and Finance of seeking to bring down the government, highlighting growing tensions between the two politicians. On 29 June 2011, he apologised to Tremonti for the tone of his previous remarks, while continuing to express disagreement with him. In August 2011, Crosetto strongly criticised statements by Italy of Values (IdV) deputies Antonio Di Pietro and Massimo Donadi and the then Puglia president Nichi Vendola of Left Ecology Freedom (SEL), describing their positions as disconnected from reality. On the same day, in the context of the financial crisis affecting Italy, he supported the proposal to allow the purchase of Italian government bonds (BTPs).

In an interview with Il Mattino on 10 August 2011, Crosetto advocated a one-off wealth tax as a means of addressing the financial crisis more rapidly. The following day, he warned that his vote on the government's economic decree could not be taken for granted, continuing his opposition to Tremonti's approach. On 14 August 2011, Crosetto was identified among the PdL dissidents preparing alternative proposals concerning the government's austerity measures. On 23 August 2011, he called for the continuation of reform while criticising the Northern League for what he described as mistakes, including its position on the Libyan intervention. In October 2011, Crosetto continued to present himself as a politician willing to take positions "against the current", reflecting his increasingly independent stance within the governing centre-right coalition.

==== Splitting from The People of Freedom ====
Following Berlusconi's resignation in November 2011, Crosetto criticised the formation of the technical government led by pro-austerity economist Mario Monti. Starting in July 2011, he had already begun to strongly challenge the decisions Tremonti and the Berlusconi government, including Claudio Scajola, and distinguished himself for his outspokenness and independence. In one occasion, Crosetto voted for an opposition amendment, dissenting from the group, and Scajola, whom Crosetto said he would eventually come to appreciate, stood up from the government benches and came toward him shouting: "Hey, kid, we didn't bring you here so you could vote for whatever you want. Press the button the group leader tells you to and stop being a pain in the ass!" Crosetto recalled that his response was that of "someone six feet tall, me, compared to someone perhaps under five feet tall, Scajola", retorting: "If that's the case, Mr. Minister, you were wrong to nominate me." Crosetto said that for this episode of someone who thought for himself, he earned the respect of many.

During 2012, Crosetto became increasingly critical of the PdL, disagreeing with Berlusconi's return to the political scene and the PdL's position toward the Monti government. On 19 July 2012, Crosetto was among the few members of Parliament to vote against the ratification of the European Stability Mechanism (ESM). The other members to vote against were a fellow PdL member (also against the party line) and Northern League (LN) members in the Chambers of Deputies, while the LN senators and two other senators, one from the PdL and one from IdV, voted against the treaty in the Senate of the Republic.

=== Brothers of Italy ===
==== Co-founder of FdI ====
In December 2012, Crosetto left the PdL and co-founded FdI, a national conservative party, originally named Brothers of Italy – National Centre-Right (Fratelli d'Italia – Centrodestra Nazionale), in opposition to the PdL and the Monti government, with Meloni and La Russa. Upon its founding, FdI was referred to as representative of the anti-Monti right-wing, and Crosetto saw the party as the new representative of the Italian centre-right, rhetorically asking at the Atreju festival, described as "a sort of party fair" for FdI, "Who can represent the centre-right, if not us?" From 20 December 2012 until 4 April 2013, when he was succeeded by La Russa, Crosetto served as president of FdI, (Note: Crosetto was part of a triumvirate, known as the Presidential Committee (Comitato di Presidenza), alongside fellow co-founders Ignazio La Russa and Giorgia Meloni. See "Comitato di Presidenza". Fratelli d'Italia (in Italian). 2013. Archived from the original on 14 June 2013. "I membri del Comitato di Presidenza sono (in ordine alfabetico): Guido Crosetto, Ignazio La Russa, Giorgia Meloni." [The members of the Presidential Committee are (in alphabetical order): Guido Crosetto, Ignazio La Russa, Giorgia Meloni.]) and subsequently until 8 March 2014 acted as national coordinator of the party, which remained an ally but alternative of Berlusconi and the PdL. Despite the split, Berlusconi continued to express esteem towards Crosetto, who recalled that he had hoped Crosetto would have joined him in the new Forza Italia (FI) following the end of the PdL. As the leading candidate for the Senate of the Republic in Piedmont, Crosetto strongly criticised the candidates of the PdL.

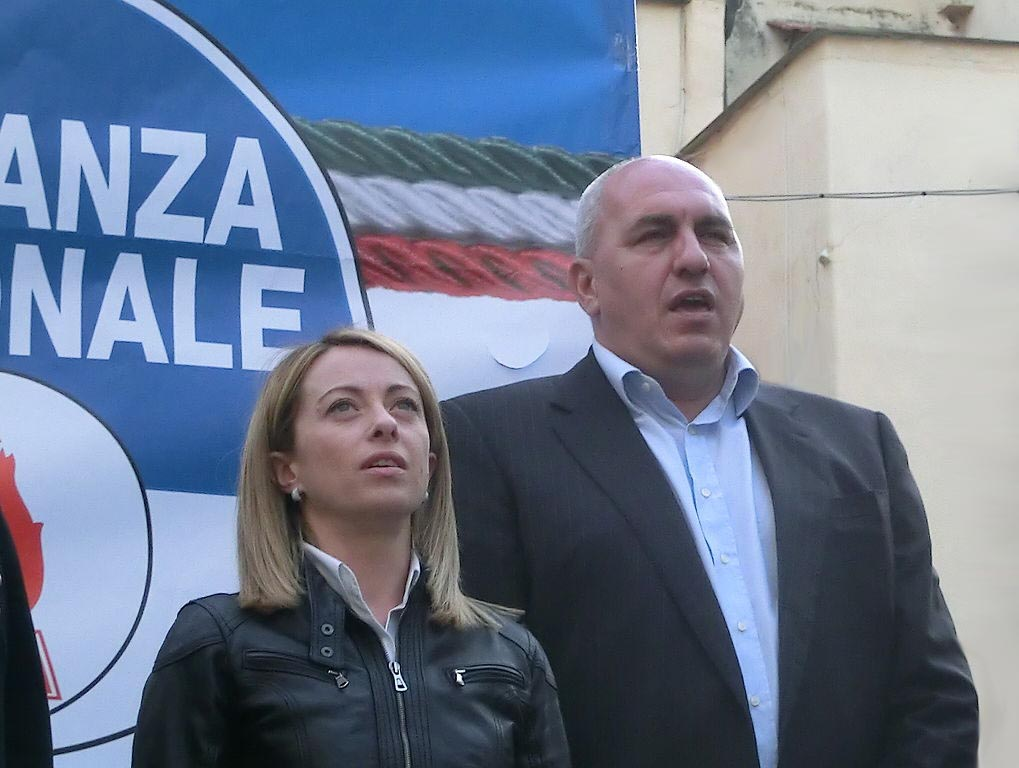
Crosetto and Giorgia Meloni at a FdI rally in 2014

With the party obtaining less than 2% of the votes, Crosetto failed to be elected in the 2013 Italian general election because FdI votes did not exceed the electoral threshold, which was set at 3% by the electoral law known as Porcellum, and only elected candidates in the first-past-the-post voting. Although FdI had received only 1.96% at the 2013 general election, its support subsequently increased in opinion polls and local elections, with a July 2013 analysis estimating that the party could exceed 4.5% if its recent local-election results were projected nationally. In November 2013, he said that he would not be electoral allies with Berlusconi and Angelino Alfano.

Crosetto ran in the 2014 European Parliament election in Italy but was not elected because once again FdI votes did not exceed the threshold set at 4% for European elections in Italy, missing it by 0.4%. On the same day, Crosetto ran in the 2014 Piedmontese regional election as the FdI candidate for president of Piedmont, and ran alone outside the centre-right coalition led by Berlusconi's FI, stating that Piedmont had been "sacrificed to Berlusconi's troubles". The regionalist LN led by Matteo Salvini was allied with FI against FdI, supporting Gilberto Pichetto Fratin's candidacy. In the election, which was won by Sergio Chiamparino of the centre-left coalition, Crosetto finished in fourth place, gaining 5.2% of votes. Following these electoral defeats, Crosetto retired from politics in September 2014, also leaving his role as national coordinator of FdI. Without Crosetto, FdI was led by Meloni, who moved the party further to the right and built closer ties to Salvini's party, which eventually became the right-wing populist League (Lega) as part of a more right-wing-led and oriented centre-right coalition.

==== Return to politics and resignation ====
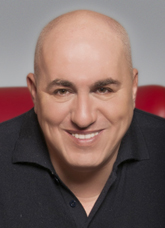
Crosetto in 2018

Crosetto returned to politics when the deputy and fellow Cuneo native Daniela Santanchè, a right-wing businesswoman and former member of the PdL and FI in Lombardy, joined Meloni's FdI in December 2017. Crosetto and Santanchè represented the small and medium-sized enterprises of northern Italy, where they ran as FdI's candidates in the 2018 Italian general election, with Crosetto again serving since 28 January 2018 as FdI's national coordinator. They respectively became members of the Chamber of Deputies and the Senate of the Republic because the party's electoral support increased, with FdI candidates being elected across multiple regions, and were among the four members from Cuneo to be elected (the others were Emma Bonino and Laura Ravetto). surpassing 4.3% of votes at the national level for the first time. The party won around 16% of the votes in the constituency of Marene, Crosetto's hometown.

After his election as deputy, Crosetto became a member of the Budget, Treasury, and Programming Commission. He was also rumoured as a possible Minister of Defence in the Government of Change between Lega and the Five Star Movement (M5S), with Crosetto appreciating the positive views both parties held of him but stating that his candidacy would have only made sense in a clear political alliance. In December 2018, Crosetto's speech to the Chamber of Deputies during the approval of the 2019 budget law was applauded and went viral, even earning the "comrade" (compagno) label by La Repubblica. Crosetto later commented: "You've heard speeches like the one in the Chamber before; when I lambasted Berlusconi, when I clashed with Tremonti or Scajola, when I voted against the fiscal compact. The paths are varied, but one tries to maintain consistency."

On 15 March 2019, Crosetto's seat was taken by the first candidate on the list of non-elected at the 2018 general election, the businesswoman and FdI member Lucrezia Mantovani. This was because he had resigned on 13 March 2019 to continue his business career, although the resignation process proved difficult and it was only accepted after a third attempt. Although he left his role as the party's national coordinator upon his resignation, Crosetto clarified that he would not leave politics, and said in 2022 that he was no longer The Right Honourable, the honorifix title for the Italian members of Parliament or ministers, but was a simple citizen.

==== Party growth ====
In the 2019 Abruzzo regional election on 10 February, FdI achieved its first regional-government breakthrough when Marco Marsilio was elected president of Abruzzo, after the party secured the centre-right coalition's support for his candidacy. In April and May 2019, as non-candidate spokesman of the party, Crosetto helped Meloni in the campaign for the 2019 European Parliament election in Italy. FdI, which joined the European Parliament as a member of European Conservatives and Reformists Group (ECR), increased its electoral support, surpassing 6.4% of national level votes for the first time. By January 2020, FdI was polling in double digits. During 2020, FdI continued to expand its representation at the regional level. In the 2020 Marche regional election on 20–21 September, Francesco Acquaroli was elected president of Marche, giving the party co-founded by Crosetto another regional presidency while it remained in opposition at the national level. By January 2021, polls were placing FdI above 15%, as the party remained the only major parliamentary force in opposition to the Draghi government after its formation in February 2021.

In the 2022 Italian presidential election, which was held in January, Crosetto was the second most voted candidate with 114 votes, the double of FdI's 63 grand electors, in the third ballot. La Russa said that originally they had proposed Carlo Nordio but ultimately chose Crosetto out of respect and to reflect FdI's political power within the centre-right coalition. In July 2022, a snap election was called after the 2022 Italian government crisis, which brought to the fall of the national unity government of Mario Draghi opposed by FdI, stating before the call for a snap election that he was not afraid of the ballot box. Crosetto said that this was as a result of Draghi's political inexperience, which negatively affected him, and that the governing coalition was torn up. He said that if FdI was to become the largest party of the centre-right coalition, it would remain faithful and would not affect regional governments, explicitly citing as example the regional government of Alberto Cirio of FI in Piedmont. In response to rumours about him becoming Prime Minister or Minister of Defence, he said that he supported Meloni becoming Prime Minister as she would be the most voted party leader and that it would seem "inappropriate, given my job" if he were to become Minister of Defence. Crosetto himself said that he chose not to run as candidate in order to "keep my freedom", adding that if he were join the government, he would have to "leave everything".

==== Meloni government ====
Official portrait of Crosetto in 2022

In a record-low voter turnout election in September 2022, FdI became the largest party in the country, gaining more than 26% of votes and the centre-right coalition won a clear majority in both houses of the Italian Parliament. In ten years, the party he helped to found had started from 2% and reached 26% to become the most voted party. The increase from 4.4% in 2018 to 26% in 2022 represented a 21.6-percentage-point gain, placing FdI's growth among the largest increases recorded between two consecutive general elections in Western Europe since the Second World War. Although he did not run in the 2022 Italian general election, Crosetto campaigned for FdI and Meloni, who became the first woman to serve as Prime Minister of Italy, especially to politically convince fellow entrepreneurs in northern Italy. He was among the first to comment on the results, stating: "The data speaks for itself: Italians have decided to put their trust in Giorgia Meloni. Not all of them, but a large portion." He added that he was not worried about Lega and FI being under 10%, stating that the coalition had "held up" well and was legitimised by the result, and this was "no time for political games". He also said that he would not be part of the new government, which he expected to be the government of the best of the centre-right coalition. He was rumoured to be appointed Minister of Economic Development.

Following its entry into government, with Crosetto serving as defence minister, FdI entered a new phase in which it sought to reconcile the political profile developed during its years in opposition with the institutional responsibilities of governing, and its organisational development and growing international presence also became more prominent features of the party's evolution. At the 2024 European Parliament election in Italy, FdI received 28.8% of the vote, its highest result in a European Parliament election and a 22.4% increase from the 6.4% it had obtained in 2019. By the end of 2025, FdI remained first in opinion polling for the next Italian general election, with polls placing the party between 28% and 31%. Crosetto also recorded relatively high levels of public confidence during his tenure as Minister of Defence, with surveys from 2022 to 2025 reporting positive assessments of his performance and relatively high levels of trust in him. He was repeatedly placed first or among the leading ministers in rankings based on public confidence or appreciation, including third place in a survey conducted shortly after the formation of the Meloni government in 2022, first place in surveys conducted in 2023 and 2024, among the ministers with the most positive assessments in 2025, and third place in 2026. By 2026, despite declining public confidence in the Meloni government, Crosetto remained among its more highly regarded ministers.

=== Minister of Defence ===
==== 2022–2024 ====
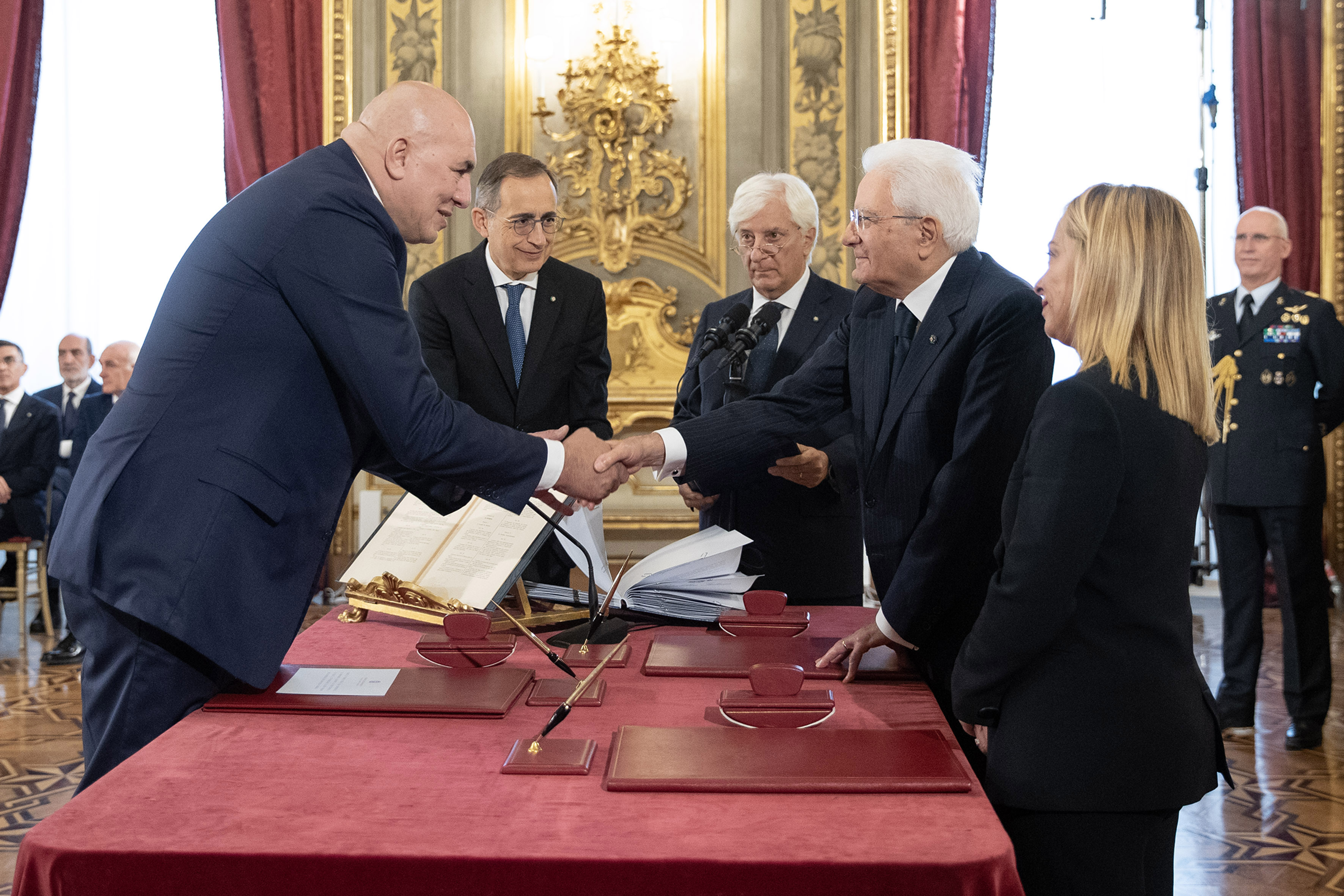
Crosetto during the swear-in ceremony of the Meloni government

On 22 October 2022, Crosetto was appointed Minister of Defence in the Meloni government. As a result, he was also appointed Chancellor and Treasurer of the Military Order of Italy. At the same time, in response to concerns about any possible conflict of interest, he announced he had "already resigned as director of every private company (I don't hold any public ones) that I (legitimately) owned. I will liquidate all my companies (all legitimate). I am giving up 90% of my current income." As defence minister, amid divisions within the centre-right coalition and in contrast to the pro-Russian views of Salvini and Lega, among the issues Crosetto found upon his appointment as defence minister were the Russo-Ukrainian war, the commitments made to increase the defence sector's GDP share to 2%, and the modernisation of equipment.

Crosetto became one of the most vocal supporters of Ukraine. In February 2023, he stated that the Ukrainian resistance was "a battle for freedom, a battle for international law, a battle for Europe". Moreover, he added that the NATO military support to Volodymyr Zelenskyy's government prevented the break out of World War III, which would have been inevitable if "Russian tanks reached Kyiv". Due to his statements, Crosetto became the target of attacks from members of the Russian government and elite. Former president Dmitry Medvedev labeled him as "foolish", while Yevgeny Prigozhin, founder of the Wagner Group, heavily insulted him. On 15 March 2023, the Italian newspaper Il Foglio reported that the Wagner Group put a €15 million bounty on Crosetto. In June 2023, Crosetto reiterated Italy's support for Ukraine amid further bombing from Russia while calling for a diplomatic solution.

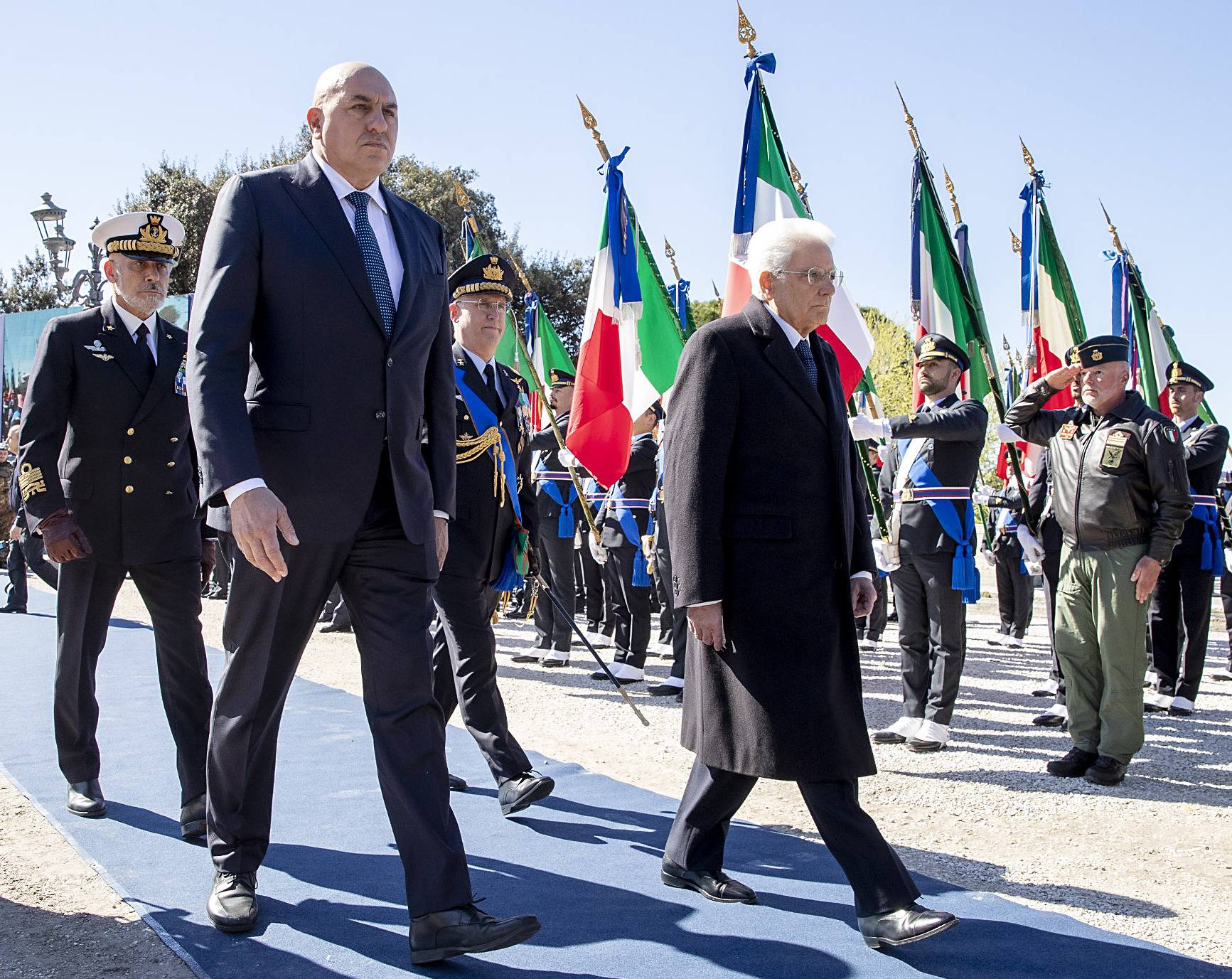
Crosetto with Italian President Sergio Mattarella in 2023

In August 2023, Crosetto spoke of "personal ravings" in relation to Roberto Vannacci's book, which was widely described as containing homophobic and racist statements, while many members of the Meloni government defended or downplayed Vannacci and his controversial statements. Vannacci, a general of the Italian Army, was dismissed by Crosetto, who said that in relation to the Vannacci affair he acted as minister rather than politician. Crosetto said that he would do what he did again, referring to defending the institutions. Crosetto also defended himself from criticism across the political spectrum, and added that there were rules that must be respected and that he would have done the same had Vannacci wrote a book arguing opposing theses. In a note in December 2023, he said that Vannacci had been replaced, and not dismissed, by an explicit decision of the Chief of Staff of the Italian Army. In February 2024, Vannacci's attorney said that Crosetto had ordered an 11-month disciplinary suspension for Vannacci. In April 2024, Crosetto criticised the candidacy of Vannacci to the European Parliament.

==== 2024–2026 ====
In January 2024, Crosetto condemned the commemorations of the Acca Larentia killings, which included fascist salutes, stating that he always condemnded fascist salutes and was politically distant from "any manifestation that recalls past regimes". Following Russian propaganda taking advantage of this by widely sharing the images of the fascist salutes, which went viral worldwide, and the fact that FdI is the heir of the neo-fascist Italian Social Movement (MSI), Crosetto and the opposition attacked each other by claiming that the other was promoting or favouring Russia's propaganda. The Union of Italian Jewish Communities president Noemi Di Segni called for new and stronger laws to contain neo-fascism and nostalgic neo-fascist apologists.

During his ministry, Crosetto often criticised the migration policies promoted by Germany and its chancellor Olaf Scholz, saying that he would have expected from Germany more "assistance and solidarity" with Italy in its "moment of difficulty" as it coped with the rise of immigrants within the country. In May 2024, he criticised Israel's actions during the Rafah offensive in the Gaza Strip. After a few days, he expressed opposition to the use of Western-supplied weapons for attacks inside Russia and stressed the need to "leave open the possibility of negotiating an immediate truce and initiating peace talks in the coming months". On 10 October 2024, Israeli troops opened fire at three UNIFIL positions in South Lebanon, including UNIFIL's main base at Naqoura, in the area of responsibility of the Italian contingent. The attack damaged communication systems between the base and the UNIFIL command in Naqoura. Crosetto described the attack as a "possible war crime" and urgently summoned the Israeli ambassador to Italy over the events that occurred at the UNIFIL bases, where Italian personnel operate. He also contacted Israeli Defence Minister Yoav Gallant for a discussion and a formal protest asking for guarantees on the safety of Italian personnel and UNIFIL bases.

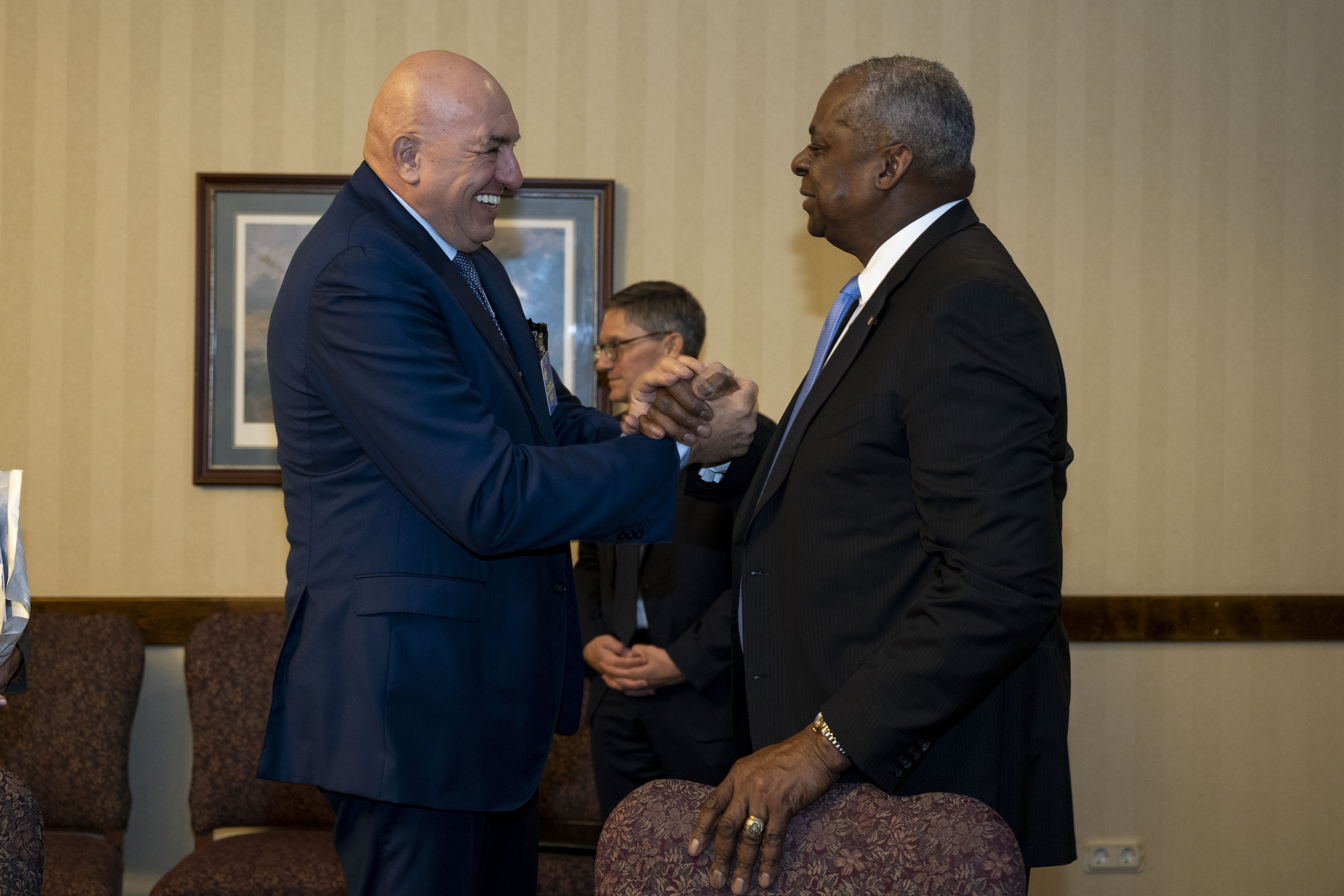
Crosetto with Lloyd Austin in 2025

On 31 May 2025, Crosetto said that like "all Italian governments, we are friends of Israel", but added that Israeli raids in Gaza City were unjustified and that Israeli Prime Minister Benjamin Netanyahu "must stop them: this is how the spiral of hatred grows". In October 2025, Crosetto was denounced by the Jurists and Lawyers for Palestine group to the International Criminal Court for alleged complicity in war crimes and the Gaza genocide, such as by providing the supply of armaments and military and technological cooperation that aided the Israeli military offensives, while another denounce was related to ascertain whether the Meloni government had responsibility for not protecting the Global Sumud Flotilla from the Israeli blockade. Among the other Meloni government figures cited were Meloni as the prime minister and Antonio Tajani as the foreign minister, alongside the Leonardo defence company and its CEO Roberto Cingolani. In response, Crosetto said in December 2025 that he had sued "all the disgusting people who connect us to the genocide".

On 9 October 2025, Crosetto expressed his willingness to send armed forces as part of an Italian peace mission in Gaza, stating: "The Armed Forces are ready to play their part, as they have always demonstrated, in all the international missions in which they participate. Italy is there and always will be there when it comes to helping and supporting peace processes." As European countries, such as France and Germany, re-introduced the military service or strengthened the military, while other countries kept an obligatory military service, Crosetto said in November 2025 that he would present a draft bill reintroducing military service in Italy, clarifying that it would be on a voluntary basis. In January 2026, amid increased international tensions, Crosetto presented seven new spending programmes for the Italian Armed Forces, bringing the total number of armament projects to 74. The proposed total military and defence investments would exceed €60 billion, with costs rising for some projects. This came following the package of measures presented at the beginning of December 2025, which included multi-year financial commitments of €4.3 billion.

==== 2026–present ====
In February 2026, during a family holiday in Dubai, Crosetto was temporarily stranded in the United Arab Emirates after commercial flights were suspended following the United States and Israel's attacks on Iran. The attacks also affected Dubai, where explosions were reported and Italian citizens were among those affected by the disruption. He had travelled from Rome on a civilian flight to join his family, who were already in Dubai, and had originally been scheduled to return to Italy the following day. Italian reports said that the trip had not been communicated in advance to the intelligence services. On 1 March, Crosetto announced that he would return to Italy alone on a military aircraft, while his family would remain in Dubai. Crosetto said he would reimburse three times the cost of the state aircraft, which he said he had used because returning by civilian flight would have posed additional risks. The episode attracted international attention, and prompted criticism from opposition parties, which questioned Crosetto's presence abroad during the military escalation and the circumstances of his trip; the M5S subsequently called for his resignation on institutional grounds. Crosetto later acknowledged that remaining in Dubai had been a mistake in his capacity as defence minister and apologised, while disputing the opposition's interpretation of the episode.

Crosetto with United States Secretary of Defense Pete Hegseth in 2025

In March 2026, following the outbreak of the 2026 Iran war, Crosetto strongly criticised the United States and Israel for their military intervention against Iran, saying that the attacks were in breach of international law and that Italy and its allies had been forced to manage the consequences of a conflict initiated without warning. He also warned of the risk of a wider escalation, including the possibility of nuclear war, and argued that Italy should avoid direct involvement in the conflict while protecting its personnel and national interests. In response to Iranian attacks on Gulf states, Italy provided or prepared additional air-defence and counter-drone capabilities for regional partners, while Crosetto said that several Gulf countries had requested Italian air-defence systems, including the SAMP/T. From March 2026, around 400 Italian Air Force personnel were deployed to Saudi Arabia, Kuwait, and Bahrain, including four Eurofighter Typhoon aircraft tasked with helping defend assigned airspace. Crosetto rejected opposition criticism that the deployment lacked adequate parliamentary authorisation, arguing that its legal and operational framework had been presented to Parliament with full transparency.

Crosetto opposed the use of Italian military facilities for activities directly connected with the offensive against Iran, while maintaining that existing agreements allowed the United States to use Italian bases for activities falling within their established framework. In April 2026, he said that Italy had refused permission for US military aircraft to use Naval Air Station Sigonella for purposes outside the existing agreements and warned that the war was threatening US global leadership and increasing the danger of nuclear escalation. In August 2026, the Italian government formally requested €8 billion from the EU's Security Action for Europe (SAFE) defence funding programme, a decision strongly supported by Crosetto because of the lower borrowing costs offered by the scheme.

By August 2026, aid to Ukraine was still being delivered. On 26 August, following accusations by Vannacci—by this time leader of the far-right National Future party—that the government was publicly highlighting the delivery of generators while allegedly preparing new military aid behind closed doors, Crosetto rejected reports that the government was preparing a thirteenth package of military aid. He stated that the package did not yet exist and that although Parliament had authorised the government to provide assistance to Ukraine in 2026, no new form of aid had been formally approved that year. He also clarified that Italian assistance consisted of goods and equipment rather than financial transfers, including more than 300 civilian electricity generators, while military deliveries authorised in previous years continued. On 28 August, Crosetto announced that former Ukrainian Defence Minister Mykhailo Fedorov had accepted a position as innovation adviser to the Italian Ministry of Defence, with the aim of helping Italy adopt modern warfare technologies and strengthen its defence capabilities.

In September 2026, amid the Red Sea crisis and pending a European response, Crosetto announced plans to deploy Italian Navy ships to protect Italian vessels transiting the Bab el-Mandeb Strait. He accused Il Fatto Quotidiano of "inventing and distorting the facts", rejecting the newspaper's claim that Italy had entered a war without informing Parliament or the president of the Republic; he stated that Italy was not at war and that Parliament and the Quirinal Palace had not been excluded from decisions concerning Italian military deployments.

== Image ==
=== Public image ===
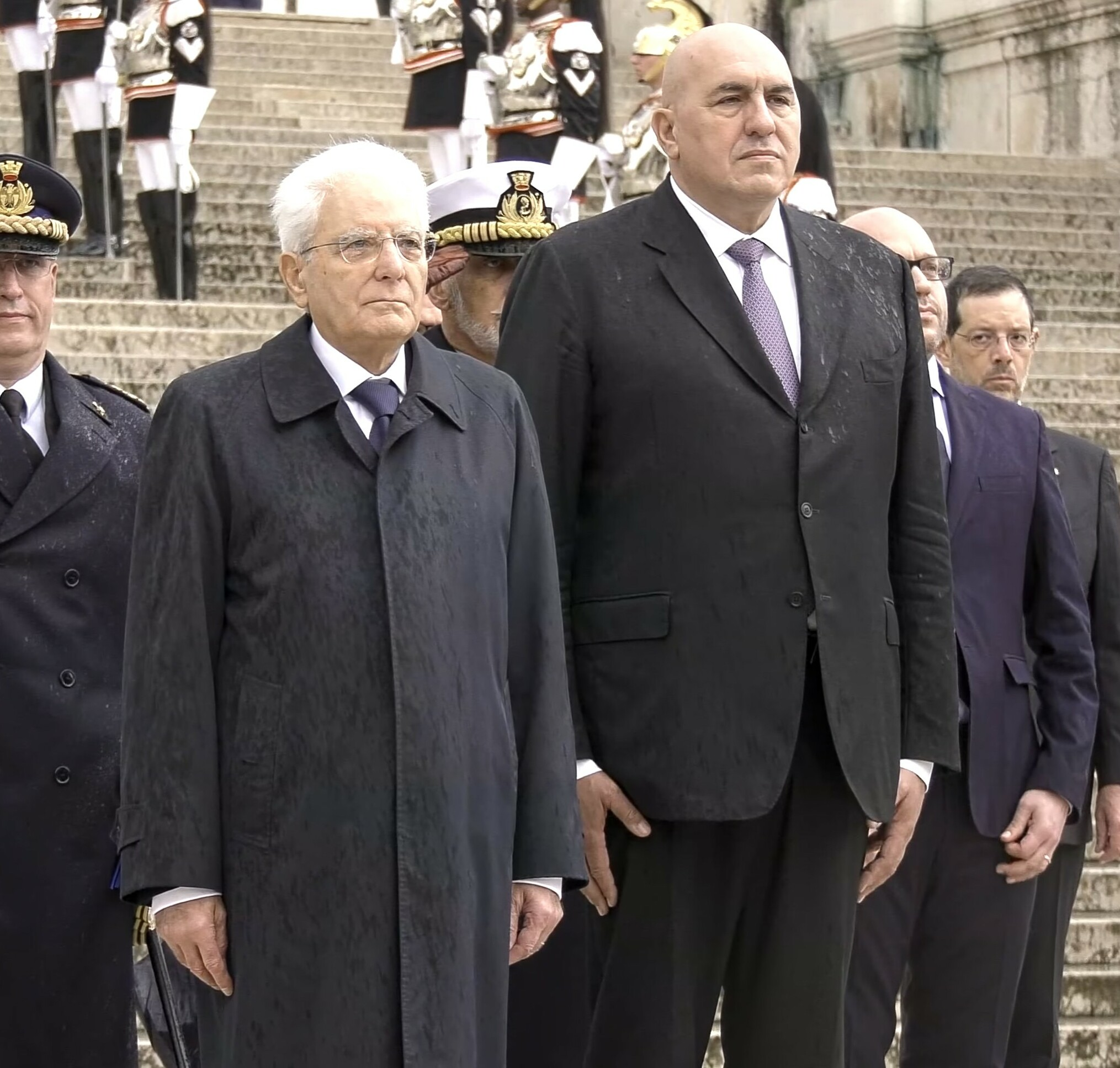
Crosetto with Mattarella on National Unity and Armed Forces Day in 2022

Due to his height and size, reported to be 1.96 m (6 ft 5 1/4 in) and around 110 kilograms (240 pounds; 17 stone 5 pounds), Crosetto entered Italian popular culture through Internet memes about comparisons with the Marvel Comics character Kingpin, the Giant character in The Iron Giant, and Lemuel Gulliver, and was referred to as "The Giant of Marene" (il gigante di Marene), "The Good Giant" (il gigante buono), and "The Friendly Giant" (il gigante amico). A 2012 photo of him ("The Giant of Marene") holding Meloni ("The Child of the Oppian Hill") in his arms, known as "The Giant and the Child", became a classic of the iconography of the Melonian refoundation.

A "larger-than-life" figure, Crosetto's fellow party members began to call him the "sky blue Shrek" (Shrek azzurro), as he was described as a middle way between Roberto Benigni and Shrek, a comparison that Crosetto himself played up as he was not bothered or offended by it since Shrek is "too funny", and often joked about it, stating: "When President Meloni hugs me, she never goes above my waist." He also cited Buraco plays with Meloni, who he joked "gets really angry when she loses at Buraco. It's happened a few times when we travel together: the last time we played, it was a huge satisfaction because I crushed her!" Of him, Aldo Grasso wrote: "The drama of the Friendly Giant is the same drama experienced by Gulliver: realising he's gigantic only because others are Lilliputians, short-tempered, dwarfs."

In the 2020s, Crosetto recalled several jokes that Berlusconi used to tell, referencing his tall figure, "Sit down, Guido. You and I are incompatible standing" and "Remember: If we're on stage together, you have to move away". Crosetto said that Berlusconi once said "three things to me: 'You're too tall, cut your hair shorter because you're losing it, and go on a diet.' In the years that followed, the first thing he said to me when I walked into his office was 'Guido, sit down!'" Notably, Crosetto once organised an event with twelve thousand people at the Palasport in Turin and he and Berlusconi were supposed to go on stage together. Backstage, he said that Berlusconi looked down at his feet, looked at him, and said: "Guido, if you don't mind, I'll go in alone." Moreover, Crosetto said that he always told the truth to Berlusconi, which he appreciated him for, referencing an episode with Gianni Letta and another with Berlusconi's then wife Francesca Pascale—in the midst of the 2011 yield spread crisis—who asked him to convince Berlusconi to step down as Prime Minister.

Crosetto is seen as a moderate and mediator, outspoken but not aggressive, and partisan but also bipartisan, who did not grow up in far-right politics like other FdI members and co-founders, earning him some support on the left. During his career, Crosetto was known for expressing criticism of Berlusconi and his party, for example Berlusconi's decision to cancel the scheduled 2012 PdL primary elections. Crosetto said that he engages with everyone, citing Luigi Di Maio of the M5S, Guerini and Letta of the PD, Giancarlo Giorgetti of Lega, and Berlusconi of FI. As a result, his name is often mentioned when a technical "government of the best" (governo dei migliori) and national unity government is needed, such as during the 2021 Italian government crisis. Owing to his criticism of the Monti government, he refused on the grounds that he prefers serving in a political government with a stable majority and clear politics.

=== Political profile ===
Crosetto at the Foreign Affairs Council in 2022

Crosetto is seen as an expert in political strategies and was described as a "child prodigy" (enfant prodige) of the DC in the province of Cuneo and the Piedmont region. Reflecting his broad and cross-party appeal, when he attempted to resign as deputy in October 2018, his resignation were rejected twice and only accepted in March 2019, as many deputies attempt to dissuade Crosetto, who thanked his colleagues "for the respect you have given me, from all parties". Enrico Costa of FI said he would vote against Crosetto's resignation because "this Chamber will be impoverished by losing him", recalling his "great mediation skills". By January 2021, Crosetto had earned an entry in the historical Italian encyclopedia Treccani. Although he was no longer a member of Parliament since 2019 and had also resigned as the party's national coordinator with no substitute, he was considered the eminence grise of FdI. As an example of his political style and attitude, when asked about French president Emmanuel Macron, who is not much liked by some of his government allies, he calmly replied that "Macron is the president-elect of a great nation in the world, he has a remarkable resume, and he is certainly an intelligent person."

As a trusted advisor to Meloni, Crosetto said that she often let him explain the party positions to the business world, negotiate with political allies, debate with rivals, and be interviewed by journalists. He also said that when he is around Meloni, which whom he would "argue, sometimes fiercely, each defending our positions and often holding on to our own opinions even after the argument is over", she would introduce him as her defence minister "who doesn't understand much, but it's a weapon of mass deterrence". Crosetto said that he appreciated the introduction, which made him memorable rather than just another defence minister, recalling that in a NATO summit with the then United States president Joe Biden often gave him a high five. He is also highly regarded among the Transatlantic journalists and in the words of Fabrizio Roncone as "one of the few who doesn't foist poisoned meatballs on you, he never reneged on a statement, and he never cut anyone any slack: not even his then-boss, Berlusconi, who he often bludgeoned—politically—with regularity." Crosetto defined himself as "conservative by birth, respectful by choice".

Within a context that saw FdI rise from 4.3% to 6.5%, overtaking FI in late 2019 polls with 10% to become the second party of the centre-right coalition, and some polls showing support as high as 15% in July 2020, Crosetto described FdI as "a boring party, it always says the same things" but did not use it as a negative, elaborating: "Parties today are faltering. Those who vote for Brothers of Italy must make a greater effort because they don't follow trends. They can't say 'I like their position on this issue,' but it will always be a position they have today, had yesterday, and had five years ago." In contrast to those who saw FdI as a return of the right or argued that it could represent the true right, Crosetto did not see it entirely that way, stating in 2020 that "Brothers of Italy is the heir of the right, but it's something more. The ideal outcome is a party with those values but with a broader policy, a mass conservative party." In this sense, Crosetto saw FdI more as a conservative mass party akin to the Christian Democratic Union of Germany (CDU) rather than a right-wing one like the then National Front (FN) led by Marine Le Pen. Crosetto is a supporter of Meloni's new conservatism, stating in 2020: "The evolution of the historic Italian right has been crucial to ensuring that the centre-right has had the opportunity to move beyond mere testimony. Meloni, in this phase, has the task of reconciling the old values of the right with the new way of being conservative. The term conservative, in the noble sense, applied to Meloni, is something real. On the one hand, the defence of traditional values and on the other the defence of the welfare state. But an efficient welfare state."

== Political views and commentary ==
=== Domestic issues ===
==== Social and economic policies ====
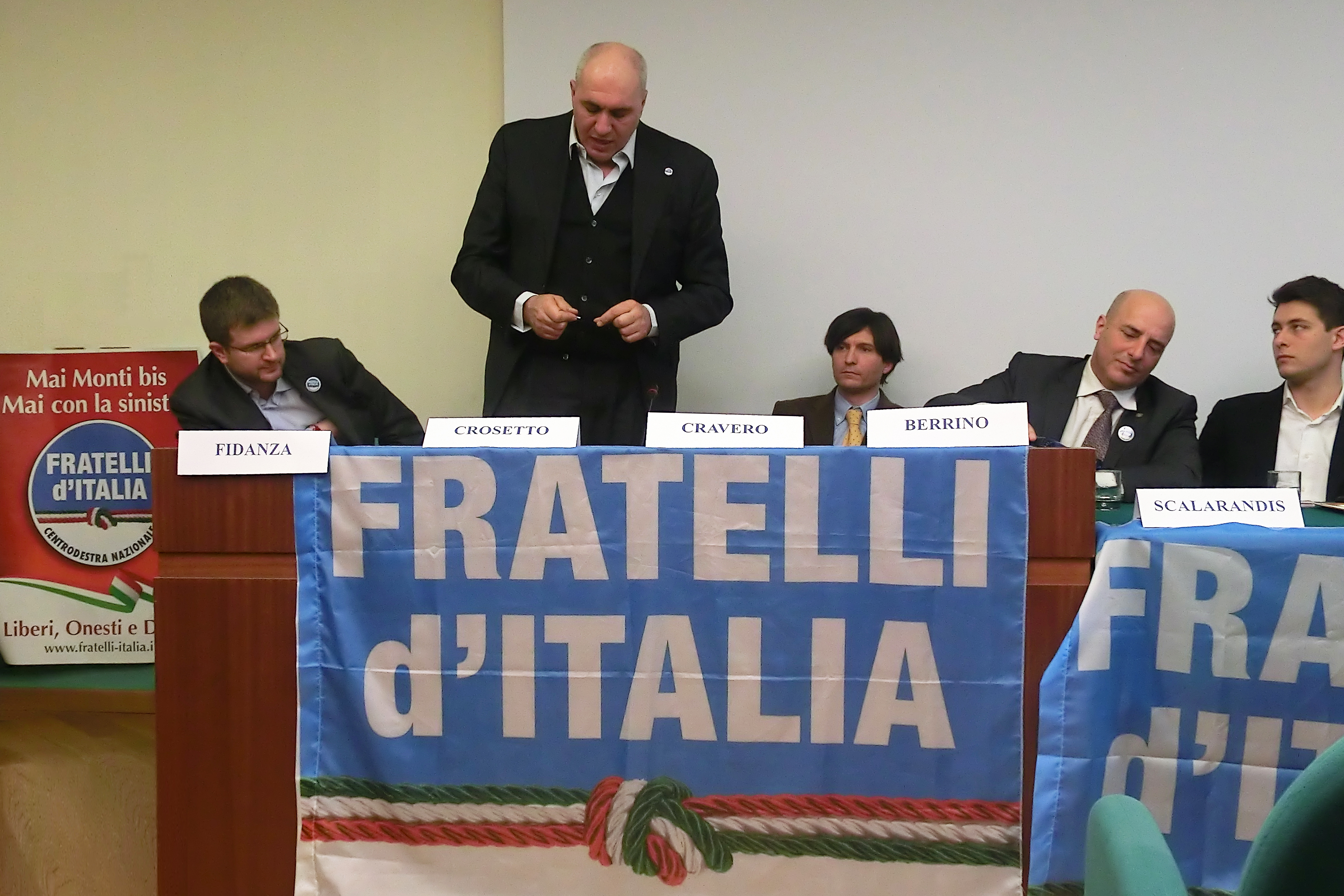
Crosetto during the 2013 electoral campaign

In 2013, Crosetto criticised a homophobic spot by FdI, going as far as to call the two authors coglioni, stating: "Any manifestation of intolerance is unacceptable." In February 2023, he helped to create a centrist electoral list and support FI for the 2024 European elections and secure the continuation of a stable majority in the Italian government. In October 2024, he said that he has friends among the parliamentary opposition and described the PD secretary Elly Schlein as a good person. Due to his moderate views, Crosetto was said to represent the left wing of the right, although he responded that left-wing does not really work as a label for him, who still sees himself as a Christian democrat.

Amid the global energy crisis and 2021–2023 inflation surge, Crosetto warned of a civil war if the government did not increase from €12–13 billion to €20 billion in aids, stating in September 2022 that Draghi should not "act offended by the vote of no confidence; take immediate action against high utility bills. If you don't, everything will collapse: businesses and families will be dead by the end of October, beginning of November, when the new government is formed." He warned that "either we get out of the crisis by helping each other, or we will fail". Amid calls within Lega, particularly in Veneto, for further regional autonomy in September 2022, Crosetto said: "The government's primary focus must be on combating the economic crisis and supporting businesses and families during such a difficult time. Autonomy will be achieved alongside presidentialism, already in the first part of the legislature, but not immediately. The economic emergency must be resolved first, and as long as the economic crisis persists, it will be very difficult to talk about anything else. But once the country is secured, then we can truly think about autonomy."

==== Anti-fascism ====
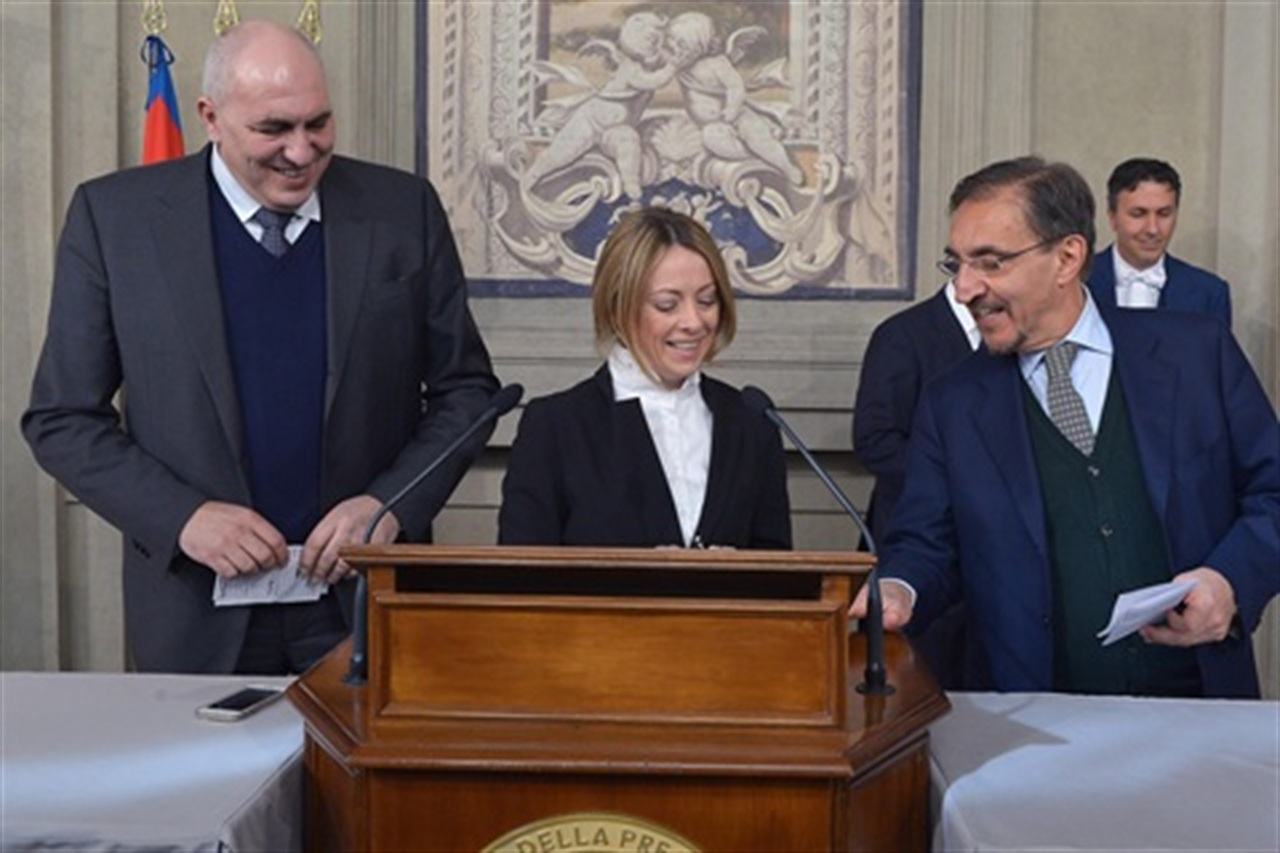
Crosetto with Meloni and Ignazio La Russa in 2014

As a representative of the moderate wing of FdI, Crosetto is open to the possibility of the tricolour flame, which is reminiscent of the party's neo-fascist origins through the MSI, to be removed from the party logo. In January 2019, this caused an uproars among other party members. Owing to his moderate and Christian-democratic origins, Crosetto is an anti-fascist, unlike many FdI members and other members of the centre-right coalition who refuse to use the label because they associate it with the left, so much so that Crosetto himself observed that he is not well liked by the right as a result.

In February 2018, in response to Roberto Speranza's comments about the anti-fascist demonstration in Rome and the lack of presence by FdI ("You should have been in the square tomorrow. I'm sorry you're not there; it's a serious mistake"), Crosetto responded from Piedmont, stating: "If I were in Rome, if I weren't in my homeland engaged in a difficult election campaign, I'd be with you. So I authorise you to say that I'm with you, as national coordinator of Brothers of Italy." His comments were criticised from the right, including by fellow party member Pasquale Viespoli.

In January 2024, Crosetto condemned the commemorations of the Acca Larentia killings with fascist salutes. Unlike other Meloni ministers, including Meloni herself, when pressed during an October 2024 interview, Crosetto explicitily said: "I always have been [an anti-fascist]. ... I always have been. ... I'm an anti-fascist." In response to fascist chants heard at the FdI youth headquarters of Parma in November 2025, Crosetto said that they should be "taken and kicked out", and added that they do not represent FdI. Despite these incidents, Crosetto said in 2025 that an anti-fascist like him has never felt out of place in FdI, saying: "I founded that party. Maybe I'm annoying to some, some might even hope I leave sooner or later; but they've never said that to my face. I'm still two meters tall!"

==== Referendums ====
Having voted against the reform in the Italian Parliament, Crosetto said that he would vote "no" in the 2020 Italian constitutional referendum, in contrast to the "yes" of FdI, elaborating: "I can accept a reduction within the framework of an institutional reform that changes the powers of the Chamber of Deputies and the Senate and perhaps introduces presidentialism. However, always with the intention of giving representation to the local areas. If we do it this way, we have to reduce them because they are ugly and evil and parliament is useless... that doesn't seem like a justification to me." Asked on whether he would vote in the 2025 Italian referendum, as the government parties called for an abstention vote in order not to reach the required 50% turnout quorum, Crosetto expressed his negative view of trade unionist and CGIL secretary Maurizio Landini, stating: "I'll decide whether to vote on 8 June. But I confess to an old prejudice: if Landini says one thing, I feel like doing the opposite. Always."

As a supporter of the justice reform approved by the Meloni government and a critic of the National Association of Magistrates (ANM), accusing the ANM of defending their privileges, Crosetto commented on the 2026 Italian referendum to confirm the constitutional reform, stating: "A referendum usually means giving the people the final say, so when you express your opinion, you acknowledge what the people have decided. The challenge is making sure people understand what we're talking about. I don't think this reform contains anything negative." Observing that the career separation of public prosecutors and judges (or magistrates) is a commonality among most democratic system and that in this Italy is the exception, Crosetto addressed concerns from critics and the opposition that it was a bad reform and it would cause the judiciary of Italy to be controlled by the executive branch, stating: "In democratic countries—I'm thinking of Spain, France, and Germany—the judicial system is completely different because, for example, public prosecutors in these three countries are subject to the executive branch. This doesn't happen in Italy; they will remain free to practice without any influence from the executive branch."

In December 2025, Crosetto said that the constitutional reform is about ending Political factionalism within the High Council of the Judiciary (CSM) and that it is mainly a political issue, stating: "The only thing that's being done is to remove the CSM from the factions, but I don't think this is something that could in any way affect the relationship between the judiciary and its work. I don't think blocking, dividing the judiciary from the investigating judiciary is a problem, given that currently 0.5% of prosecutors defect, so we're talking about an insignificant figure. It's more of a political issue than a real one; no one touches the justice system. In fact, I think they're trying to rebuild the conditions so that justice becomes justice with a capital 'J', that is, capable of protecting everyone." After the postponement decided in the last Council of Ministers of 2025 and despite the lack of an agreed date, among other issues between the government and the opposition, the most likely date for the referendum is March 2026.

=== European Union ===
Crosetto with Thierry Breton in 2022

In May 2014, as a candidate for the European Parliament, Crosetto said in relation to illegal immigration that to seriously address the issue there would need "a Europe that doesn't exist", stating that "Europe must address the unjust fate of entire African peoples. It's clear that Italy alone isn't enough. Thinking that this is an Italian issue and can be resolved by three Italian navy ships is foolish." In September 2022, Crosetto said: "The government does not represent a coalition but a nation; Europe cannot avoid dialogue ... the European Union has internal contradictions, but it can do anything except engage in dialogue with nations." During the COVID-19 pandemic in Italy, while supportive of COVID-19 vaccines, Crosetto was critical of the Green Pass on the grounds that it was discriminatory, stating: "You can't go to restaurants, but you can go on the bus and subway. What's the point?"

Regarding the most controversial points that emerged during the 2022 election campaign, namely the changes to the National Recovery and Resilience Plan (PNRR) as part of Next Generation EU, Crosetto said that "no one wants to revise the PNRR guidelines, but from the time of the forecast to today, the cost of the works has increased by 20 percent." In relation to the postponement of "the CO2 problem for one or two years", he cited Alessandro Manzoni from The Betrothed ("I think Manzoni's phrase in The Betrothed is valid: 'Adelante, con juicio si puedes' (Go ahead, with judgment you can)", adding that "we can't pretend that nothing has changed" since the Russian invasion of Ukraine, that green politics in the EU were "developed with different economic conditions", and that postponing the issue for a few years would not ruin the European Green Deal.

In an interview with the Corriere della Sera on 26 June 2023, Crosetto commented on the Meloni government's hesitation to ratify the reform of the treaty establishing the ESM. Four days earlier, the Chamber of Deputies' Foreign Affairs Committee had approved the basic text of the bill for ratification; the parties supporting the government did not participate in the vote. According to Crosetto, "we need to discuss among ourselves how necessary Europe is as a tool and how we in the centre-right see it as a coalition and as a government. We need to discuss the advantages and disadvantages, without prejudice." He expressed his view that those who have sought help from the ESM "have been crushed". In an interview with La Repubblica on 5 July 2023, Crosetto declined Salvini's proposal of signing a pact between the centre-right coalition parties in favour of a right-wing coalition in the European Parliament between the EPP, ERC, and Identity and Democracy (I&D), stating that his party's European project is to form an alliance between the EPP and ERC, opening the way to a new "Ursula majority". In relation to Le Pen's renamed National Rally (RN), he said: "We belong to another group and we are different, as is well known. And it's a choice we made many years ago."

In March 2025, Crosetto told Geppi Cucciari and Giorgio Lauro that the name ReArm Europe was "one of the stupidest gifts one could give to those who don't believe defence is a relevant issue", elaborating: "My colleagues and I have explained that the issue isn't rearmament but rather the construction of a defence, which are two completely different things. Defend Europe would be better. Rearmament is part of defence. Israel suffered a missile attack in three hours, which it managed to stop 98% of the way: well, my European colleagues and I would like us to be able to stop it the same way if something like that were to happen in our countries. If it were to happen today in Italy, we wouldn't be able to." Also in March 2025, he said that what scares him is "when, at a time like this, the issue of common European defence is dismissed by exploiting, as Giuseppe Conte did, a word like 'rearmament', which is objectively an ugly, repulsive word, used to scare people. I'm talking about defence. But if anyone thinks we shouldn't defend our nation, fine, let them say so. This will be the century of the great superpowers: if you're not one of them, if you don't prepare, and if you don't connect with other 'small' ones like yourselves, there'll be trouble."

=== Foreign issues ===
==== Ukraine and Russia ====
As minister of defence, Crosetto expressed pro-Ukrainian views. In January 2023, he said: "World War III would begin the moment Russian tanks arrived in Kyiv and at the borders of Europe. Preventing them from arriving is the only way to stop World War III." He also stated: "I am experiencing this period with great personal difficulty. I am seen as the one who supports weapons, the one who wants war. There is this strange idea that there is a country we don't care about, which is bothering us. That by being at peace, it is forcing us to do things we shouldn't do, that it is that country's fault if inflation rises. That country has been invaded." To Russia, he said: "There is no angel or Devil, we are not passing judgment. No one has anything against the Russian people, there is no war between Italy, Europe, NATO, and the Russian people: there is an international coalition that is helping a country that has been attacked. We must do this, and we are doing it to prevent a crisis that began in a crazy way from exploding."

In March 2023, Crosetto said: "It seems to me that we can now say that the exponential increase in migration from the African coast is also, to a considerable extent, part of a clear hybrid warfare strategy that the Wagner Group, mercenaries in the pay of Russia, is implementing, using its considerable influence in some African countries." In the 125-page paper "Countering Hybrid Warfare: An Active Strategy" published in November 2025, he condemned the Russian hybrid war and lamented the lack of actions from the European Union (EU) and NATO, writing: "The hybrid war is continual and attacks critical infrastructure, decision-making centers, essential services and the fabric of each country, with daily and growing risks of catastrophic damage. We are under attack and the hybrid bombs continue to fall: The time to act is now."

In March 2025, on the issue on whether there would be Italian soldiers guarding the Ukrainian border, Crosetto said: "This debate is surreal and premature at the same time. Because the truce will be the product of conditions that will have to be accepted by everyone, including the Russians. This is the European Union's concern, which is not included at that table." He concluded that "for me, on that border there can only be the UN or an international peacekeeping mission that unites almost the entire world, as in Lebanon. And Italy has always participated in UN missions."

At the December 2025 edition of Atreju, the annual political convention of the youth wing of FdI, Crosetto had a debate with Il Fatto Quotidiano editor Marco Travaglio. Of the Russo-Ukrainian war, he told Travaglio: "I never believed those who said Ukraine would break Russia's back. No one ever believed Ukraine could win the war, but Ukraine won the war when it survived." Crosetto further told Travaglio that "Putin talks about peace, but he fired 1,200 missiles at Ukraine, yesterday and tomorrow. For a thousand days, this brilliant man has been talking about peace and the desire to harm no one, yet he continues to attack schools and hospitals. 93% of the targets are civilian." In response to Travaglio's argument that the expansion of NATO and the bombing or invasion of Russia's allies (Serbia, Iraq, and Libya), which he claimed it showed NATO was not a "solely defensive" alliance as said by Crosetto, were the main causes of the 2022 Russian invasion Ukraine, he cited the example of Sweden, and stated: "It seems true, and it's even nice to say, but I have the problem of being too rational. Sweden, a non-aligned and non-partisan country for 70 years, asked to join NATO. It did so after the Ukrainian invasion, and it took two and a half years. If free and democratic nations decide to join an exclusively defensive alliance, are they encircling someone or are they defending themselves from those they fear?"

==== China, Europe, and the United States ====
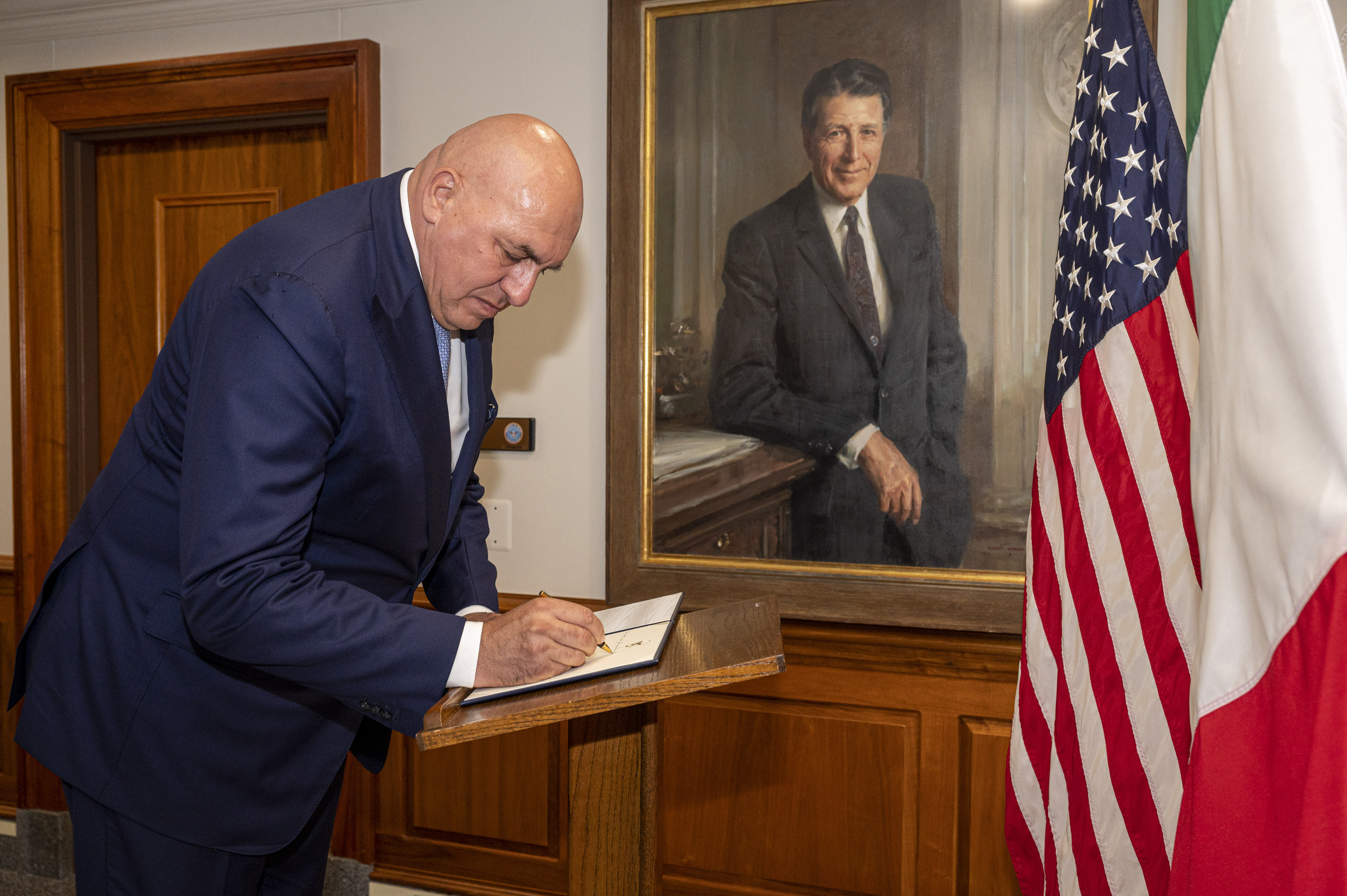
Crosetto signing a Pentagon guest book prior to a bilateral exchange in Washington, D.C., on 23 June 2023

In July 2023, Crosetto criticised the Belt and Road Initiative, stating: "The decision to join the Silk Road was an improvised and ill-advised move by Giuseppe Conte's government, which led to a double negative outcome. We exported a shipment of oranges to China, and they tripled their exports to Italy in three years." In March 2025, he said that the 20th century had been "the century of great wars and great dictatorships", which was followed by "the century of great democracies". He expressed his belief that the 21st century would be "the century of great superpowers, but not democratic ones", adding: "I wouldn't be surprised if the next G7 is made up of the US, China, Russia, India, and maybe Saudi Arabia: no longer nations that have represented great democracies but nations that represent great powers. Peace is a balance between forces: what we hope for is that the balance is achieved without weapons, but if only one of the two is super-armed, there is no balance. In August 2025, Crosetto stated that "Italy is a great nation, but we all know it doesn't play in the superpower league" and that the present EU "doesn't exist as a state. ... It has no weight because it can't compare to the US or Russia." As a result, Crosetto suggested that the Italian government should draw the consequences and work towards the federalisation of the EU and make it a state.

On 6 December 2025, Crosetto published a long post on X (formerly Twitter), expressing his views about the second Trump administration's relations with this "small, slow, and old" Europe as President Trump made it clear that he does not need Europe and that they see themselves in competition for supremacy and superpower status with China, stating: "The trajectory of American politics was evident even before the arrival of Trump who only accelerated an irreversible path." He further wrote: "The bad news is that we should (in my opinion, we should) think about what our American allies have provided us, free of charge, up to now: security, defence, and deterrence. I'm not just talking about military ones." As a result, he called for a series of reforms "not to exercise supremacy over anyone but to guarantee our future".

On 13 December 2025, Crosetto said he was "disappointed" it was the United States that intervened "to negotiate a peace in the heart of Europe", and added that "Europe's absence at the negotiating table is the result of Europe's weakness and its inability to speak with one voice. If tomorrow the European states were to say that one person represents the entire negotiation, neither Trump nor Russia would be able to say no." In January 2026, Crosetto did not immediately publicly comment on Operation Absolute Resolve, the United States raids in Venezuela resulting in the capture and extradition of Nicolás Maduro and his wife Cilia Flores. He was reported to have spoken with Meloni and her aides. Gianclaudio Torlizzi, one of the advisors to Crosetto, saw the operation as anti-China and within the context of a new Cold War. Reportedly, while Crosetto himself was said to understand the Americans' motives in the raids on Caracas, he would not support the intervention, believing that international law should prevail, to the extent possible.

==== Israel and Palestine ====
On the issue of the Israeli–Palestinian conflict, Crosetto is a supporter of the two-state solution, defending Palestine's right to exist and statehood and Israel's right to live in security, which means that "Hamas terrorism must be eradicated at the same time." On the Gaza war, Crosetto represented the more critical views of Israel's handling of the war within the Meloni government, which was more supportive of Israel, placed caveats to Palestinian statehood, and refrained from criticism and the use of strong words by Crosetto, who earned the praise of some parliamentary opposition figures, such as Alessandra Maiorino of the M5S. In May 2024, Crosetto expressed the feeling that "Israel risks sowing hatred that will involve its children. I understand the reaction after the Hamas massacre of 7 October, but Hamas is one thing, the Palestinian people are another." In May 2025, while reiterating that the Italian government remained a friend of Israel, he claimed to have been "the first to distance myself from Netanyahu's actions". He also said that Hamas must be "fought and destroyed", but that it "no longer makes sense to do it with military methods now: we need other methods. The international community can no longer accept the casualties of civilians, women, and children: they are not tolerable collateral damage, Israel must understand this. As for the truce, Hamas is doing this because it is not interested in casualties. It uses bombs and hunger to recruit."

In relation to the 2025 Italian protests for Gaza, particularly the June 2025 demonstration, Crosetto said: "Look, I wouldn't mind going. To demonstrate for every civilian, woman, and child killed in Gaza. If I went, though, you'd see the level of tolerance in the square... Half of them, self-proclaimed pacifists, will be there only to fuel hatred against the government and against certain individuals. Meloni, Tajani, and Crosetto first and foremost." In an interview with La Stampa in August 2025, as reported among others by Adnkronos, Crosetto said that the Israeli government had "lost its sanity and humanity", elaborating: "What is happening in Gaza is unacceptable. We are not facing a military operation with collateral damage, but the pure denial of the law and the founding values of our civilisation. We are committed to humanitarian aid, but beyond condemnation, we must find a way to force Netanyahu to think. It's one thing to free Gaza from Hamas, another from the Palestinians. The former can be called liberation. Expelling a people from their land, however, is quite another." In September 2025, in response to the growing criticism, the Meloni government announced a motion to recognise Palestine with the condition that all Israeli hostages are released and that Hamas is excluded from any form of government, and Crosetto announced the dispatch of a frigate, the Virginio Fasan, to support the Global Sumud Flotilla. Crosetto explained that "in a democracy, even demonstrations and forms of protest must be protected, when they are conducted in compliance with international law and without resorting to violence."

== Personal life ==
=== Marriage and family ===
In 2005, Crosetto began a relationship with Gaia Saponaro, a former volleyball player from Apulia who worked in London, Hong Kong, and Sydney, whom he married on 4 July 2015. As a result, his wife is also referred to as Gaia Crosetto. Together, they have two children. and he described himself as a "fulfilled and happy father". Previously, Crosetto was married to Kamila, a volleyball player from the Czech Republic, with a son born in 1997. Crosetto said that her parents were "anti-Communist judges in a Communist country". They met in a gym in Savigliano and their relationship caused a scandal because Crosetto came from a prominent family and was marrying a non-EU citizen. In March 2025, Crosetto recalled: "Many right-thinking people thought it suspicious that such a beautiful girl would want to marry a loser like me. I married her without hesitation. And the facts, despite the separation and then the divorce, have shown that I was right not to have any hesitation."

As of 2022, Crosetto's mother was still alive and earning €550 a month as a retiree, while his eldest son went to Luiss University on a €10,000 tuition, and his youngest son asked him to not run again as a political candidate. Crosetto said that his wife is his "secret consultant" who shares his "joys and sorrows". He also described her as "my love, the rock I cling to" and said he "fell in love with her as soon as I saw her. It seemed impossible to me that someone like me could like her." It was rumoured that he left Berlusconi's party during the early 2010s because Berlusconi was attracted to his wife. Crosetto dismissed those rumours as false and "nonsense", saying that when he and Meloni went to Berlusconi to tell him they were leaving the PdL, he dismissed her with a goodbye while he asked him to stay. Despite this, Crosetto admitted that Berlusconi himself told him he was attracted to his wife and when they separated for a while, he said: "I went to Silvio and he said to me: 'Guido, I know you broke up. But would you mind if...?' ... 'Try it!' I froze him. He replied with one of his smiles: 'I just wanted to see if you were still in love.'"

In September 2023, Crosetto criticised Novella 2000, which is controlled by Visibilia of Santanchè, for having published photos of him with his wife. In his last tax return from 2000, before entering politics, Crosetto reported ₤12 billion, which is equivalent to around €6 million as of 2022. In 2024, he was reported to be the richest minister of the Meloni government with €895.588. In 2025, he was a victim of false impersonation as scammers, who posed as Crosetto, attempted to defraud at least ten prominent businessmen, and were able to obtain two bank transfers of around €1 million connected to the oil tycoon and former Inter Milan owner Massimo Moratti.

In 2025, Crosetto published Storie di un ragazzo provinciale (Stories of a Provincial Boy), his autobiography. In March 2025, Crosetto said that among the worst moments in his life was his return by helicopter from Herat to carry the coffins of people who had died on an international peacekeeping mission, including one who had died knowingly because he threw himself on a land mine when he realised it would explode and he had to defuse it, and threw himself forward to protect the people behind him, an action that Crosetto described as "the opposite of what any human being would do: when you understand the danger, you instinctively move away. Instead, the desire to protect his other colleagues prevailed over the instinct for survival. It's something that deeply struck me; it means that man had a sense of duty, of institutions, of his commitment that was extraordinary." The other moment was when his son asked as Christmas gift that he returned to smile. As Piedmont has a long tradition of wines, and on the fact that Meloni said she was abstaining from wine as a vow, he joked: "I don't make any vows about wine: I'm from Alba, and if I made vows about wine they wouldn't even let me back home."

His nephew Giovanni Crosetto entered politics in 2021 and followed his moderate and anti-fascist politics within FdI. For example, in relation to the apology of fascism, his nephew condemned the commemorations of the Acca Larentia killings with the fascist salute, as did Crosetto himself, and also criticised FdI members who took part at the presentation of the controversial book of Vannacci, who had been dismissed as a result by Crosetto in his role as defence minister. In the 2024 European Parliament election in Piedmont, Crosetto's nephew was elected to the European Parliament, with around 34,000 preferential votes in the North-East Italy constituency, of which 19,643 in Piedmont, where he was the only elected candidate to the European Parliament. About their relations, his nephew was often quoted as saying: "I'm lucky to have a truly paternal relationship with my uncle, he's a teacher, he gives me advice and shows me the path to follow."

=== Charity and other businesses ===
Crosetto is involved in CRT Foundation, a charity organisation, being described as a "close friend of the foundation", which he prevented from going into administration. With Carlo Petrini, he was one of the founders of the Pollenzo Agency and the University of Gastronomic Sciences. In September 2014, Crosetto left his political commitment and was appointed for some years president of the AIAD of Confindustria, and in the same year became Senior Advisor to the Leonardo company. In April 2020, he was appointed chairman of Orizzonte Sistemi Navali, a company created as a joint venture between Fincantieri and Leonardo, which operates in the naval engineering and systems sector, designing and building military naval units, in particular corvettes, frigates, and aircraft carriers. Crosetto was also a shareholder in six Italian companies, including CSC & Partners, which was founded in 2021 in Rome and operated in lobbying services.

In response to critics who describe him as an arms lobbyist at the head of AIAD, as a result of which he was audited by the Italian Parliament, Crosetto said: "Bullshit. I'm defending the primacy of Italian companies in the world: 150,000 direct jobs and the same number indirectly, in the most controlled sector on the planet." Moreover, he noted that he needs authorization from the Ministry of Foreign Affairs to move a brochure to a trade show, and he also needs clearance from the Ministry of Defence to publish the company directory. He explained that his role is honorary and that he is not paid any money as a result. He said that he worked well with three ministers—Roberta Pinotti and Lorenzo Guerini of the PD and Elisabetta Trenta of the M5S—all of whom he said were "my political adversaries", and that he is "obsessed with conflicts of interest", so he only accepts "a fifth of the jobs they offer" to him, describing himself as a private individual who does not hold public office and avoids banks and large financial companies. Since becoming defence minister in 2022, he sold all his companies and left all incompatibility and business-related roles.

=== Health issues ===
On 5 August 2021, Crosetto announced that he healed from the Delta variant of COVID-19, which aggravated his tumor condition, stating: "I had two doses of Pfizer. The second on 11 April. After months, with antibodies, I contracted the Delta variant. I was very ill. Since I have diabetes and a heart condition, they gave me monoclonal antibodies. I recovered." In February 2024, Crosetto was hospitalised due to a suspected pericarditis, sparking unfounded conspiracy theories by anti-vaccine activists. In October 2025, he underwent surgery, which successfully removed three colonic neoplasms.

=== Social media ===
Crosetto is active on social media, where he had amassed over 200,000 followers on Twitter by October 2022, often interacting with his followers and commentators, at times engaging in diatribes with his critics who insult him, in turn referring to them as coglioni, "shitty haters", and "ignorants". As a former heavy smoker, he often shares on social media his struggles with diet and health, and his feelings for his wife and children. In April 2019, Crosetto wrote of his family on Twitter: "I have a 22-year-old son, Alessandro. He attends LUISS. He's a good boy, he studies, and he'll soon finish his undergraduate degree, well and on time. They accepted him into the master's programme. Then I have a 5-and-a-half-year-old daughter and a 4-year-old son. She, Carole, is a real earthquake."

Crosetto is an anti-communist but expressed respect for communists like Marco Rizzo for being open about it, elaborating in a 14 May 2019 post on Twitter: "There's a real communist out there. He wants to leave NATO, he's inspired by Lenin, he promises to expropriate banks, real estate owners, and nationalise everything! Dear Marco Rizzo, you'll never have my vote, but real communists are better than disguised ones." In August 2021, Crosetto defended singer Emma Marrone from death threats as a result of her progressive and left-leaning views and the announcement that she had ovarian cancer and wanted to be a single mom. Crosetto wrote on Twitter: "There are people so ignorant and dangerous that they bother to insult, wish death upon, and exult over a person who confesses to her illness, Emma Marrone, just because they have different political views. Life, health, and death are ABOVE these petty human divisions, damn it." In September 2025, his Twitter account was hacked, with suspicious tweets asking for cryptocurrency donations for Gaza and the funeral of Giorgio Armani.

On social media, Crosetto did not exempt from criticism part of the Meloni government's majority, such as Lega senator Claudio Borghi, who is opposed to Italian military aids to Ukraine. In November 2025, in response to Borghi's rhetorical question ("But what if the US were to attack Venezuela? Will we send 12 weapons packages to Maduro?"), Crosetto said: "No, you can rest assured, Claudio, especially because they've never invaded a country to permanently occupy its territory under the pretext that some people spoke English. It's just one of the many differences with Russia." At the same time, he referenced his support for freedom of speech and democracy in contrast to autocracies like Russia under Vladimir Putin, stating: "Another is the fact that posts like yours, made in Russia in dissent from Putin, would be impossible, while in the US, as in Italy, they are welcome even when they say different and even opposing things. Perhaps, as some argue, this allows various autocracies to be more 'efficient' than democracies, but I will stubbornly defend the right of Claudio Borghi, and thousands of others who think differently from me on everything, to say whatever comes to mind, always."

=== Association football ===
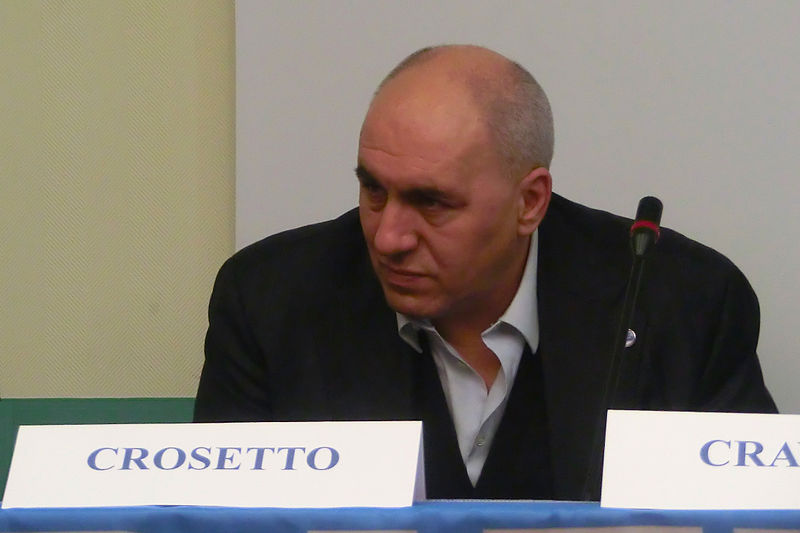
Crosetto in 2013

Like fellow Meloni ministers Elisabetta Casellati and Tajani, Crosetto is a supporter of Juventus. He is one of the founders of the Juventus Club in the Chamber of Deputies. In his 2025 autobiography, Crosetto wrote that he was a friend of Edoardo Agnelli (formerly groomed to be the heir of the Agnelli family, which also owns Juventus since 1923) and that he did not believe he committed suicide. He met Agnelli at a party in Turin and became friends who shared the ideas, culture, and the anxieties of—in Crosetto's words—"that boy so cultured, polite, courteous, and so introverted that he was the polar opposite of his father, the Lawyer". Of Agnelli's death, he said: "I don't have an alternative truth, but I've never believed that Edoardo committed suicide. And I'm not the only one." Also in Turin, he met Sergio Marchionne, with whom he shared "a secret passion for online poker, the only distraction from work Sergio allowed himself", saying that he had "never seen anyone work so hard" and that his passing was "a great loss for the country".

In July 2006, amid the Calciopoli scandal, Crosetto was open to the idea of an amnesty, which polarised Italian politics, with supporters and opponents across the political spectrum. For example, Piero Fassino of The Union, the centre-left coalition that had just defeated Berlusconi's, invoked the clemency of the judges, who had been appointed by the Italian Football Federation (FIGC) special commissioner Guido Rossi, and this was not unprecedented as an amnesty was issued under similar conditions in 1982. Crosetto shared the principle that tifosi should not pay for the mistakes of football directors, commenting: "The law should punish the responsible managers but leave Italians the chance to dream with their champions and their teams." Although many commentators and tifosi saw the scandal more as a result of the widespread anti-Juventus sentiment rather than politics, Crosetto also criticised the Calciopoli decisions by the FIGC on political grounds, arguing that the salvation from relegation for all the other clubs initially involved had been a political decision, particularly that of Fiorentina, and compared the sports proceedings to the Gestapo. More specifically, Crosetto said: "I wouldn't want only those who have friends in The Union, like Fiorentina, to be acquitted."

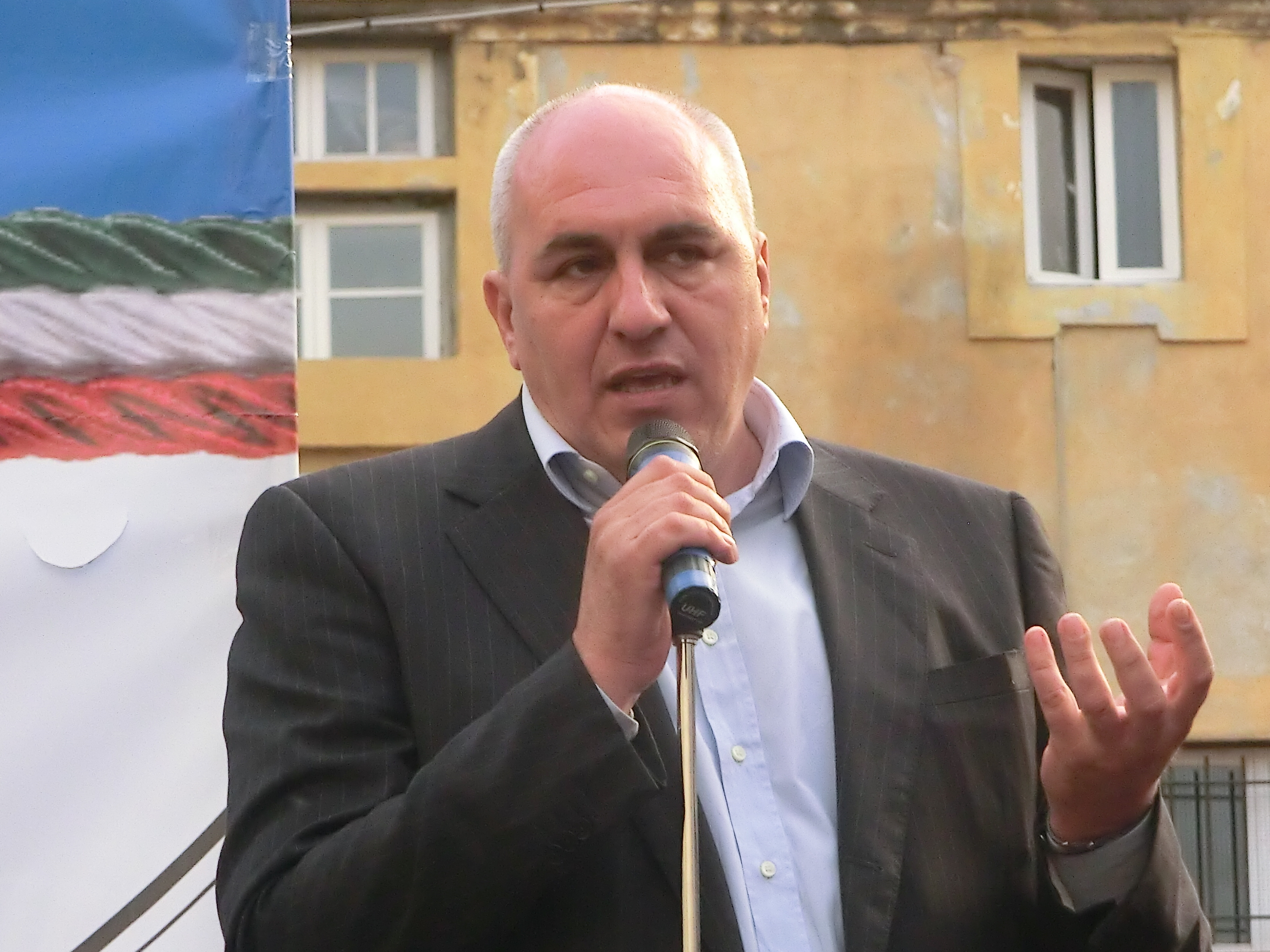
Crosetto in 2014

In line with the view of most Juventus supporters, many critics and commentators, and the club itself that Juventus received unequal treatment, Crosetto referred to Fiorentina because it was saved from relegation despite being sanctioned with a direct Article 6 violation (warranting relegation) and multiple Article 1 violations (like the other clubs who were ultimately not relegated), while Juventus was controversially relegated to Serie B due to three Article 1 violations (usually warranting fines or penalty points), with the sports decisions explicitly citing the "popular sentiment" (sentimento popolare). In 2010, the controversies prompted a proposal of a parliamentary inquiry commission about the 2003–2006 Italian football years and the role of politics and the media in the 2006 scandal and the Calciopoli bis developments in subsequent years. Although such a proposal was supported by members of various parties across the political spectrum, including among others the centre-left PD, the centrist Italian Radicals (RI), and Crosetto's centre-right party, a parliamentary commission was never established.

Amid the club's unsuccessful spell in the early 2020s after an unprecedented run of nine Serie A league titles in a row, Crosetto expressed criticism of the squad performances under then head coach Massimiliano Allegri, saying he would rather start watching basketball as it was less painful, adding that whilst his son was accustomed to disappointments as a Torino supporter, such poor results were a major blow for Juventus fans like himself. During the 2022 Italian presidential election, he joked that he would rather be president of the Juventus Club in Parliament. As defence minister after having headed the arms industry association Confindustria, in response to those who accused him of a conflict of interest, he cited football and rhetorically asked: "Does anyone think that an Inter Milan player who played for AC Milan has a conflict of interest during the derby and could favour his former team? If anything, the conflict would exist if I had continued to do both things together. I had the 'non-conflict' formally certified, and not by just anyone, but by the authority delegated to the matter. My expertise in the matter, if anything, is an advantage for the government. Not to mention that I'm the only one who knows the 'secrets' of the former team."

In March 2024, in his role as defence minister, Crosetto issued a complaint, which resulted in an investigation revealing the illegal dossiering and spying of bank accounts of around 740 VIPs and political figures, including not only Crosetto himself among other politicians and entrepreneurs, but also Juventus (the only Italian football club to be victim of the alleged illegal spying, with the other football figure being FIGC president Gabriele Gravina), in particular the figures of Andrea Agnelli, Allegri, and Cristiano Ronaldo dating back to at least 2021. Crosetto's complaint and the resulting investigation earned the attention of the Anti-Mafia Commission and the magistrate Raffaele Cantone from Perugia, where Pasquale Striano, the investigated financier who allegedly made over 800 illegal accesses to the files within the scope of approximately 5,000 database accesses carried out since 2018 and claimed to have done so due to legitimate reasons for investigation, worked as an agent (rank of official) of Italy's Judiciary Police (Polizia Giudiziaria). Dating back to 2018, leaks to the media resulted in the Luis Suárez affair and later in 2021 to a financial scandal and criminal investigation involving Juventus, which was acquitted in two sports proceedings and also received threats due to its support for the ultimately failed European Super League project, causing several commentators to wonder whether there was any connection, if there was one or more instigators, and if the goal was to specifically and negatively hit Juventus. The Anti-Mafia Commission public prosecutor Giovanni Melillo described the alleged facts, resulting from Crosetto's complaint, as "hardly compatible with the logic of individual deviation" and spoke of "extreme gravity". By May 2026, the investigation originating from Crosetto's complaint had led the Rome Public Prosecutor's Office to request the committal for trial of Striano, the former Anti-Mafia prosecutor Antonio Laudati, and other suspects, including journalists.

== Electoral history ==
Election	House	Constituency	Party	Votes	Result
2001	Chamber of Deputies	Piedmont 2 – Alba	FI	45,225	Elected
2006	Chamber of Deputies	Piedmont 1	FI	– (Note: Elected in a closed list proportional representation system)	Elected
2008	Chamber of Deputies	Piedmont 1	PdL	–	Elected
2013	Senate of the Republic	Piedmont	FdI	–	Not elected
2014	European Parliament	North-West Italy	FdI	29,305	Not elected
2018	Chamber of Deputies	Lombardy 3	FdI	–	Elected

== Notes ==
Party political offices
New political party	President of Brothers of Italy (alongside Ignazio La Russa and Giorgia Meloni); 2012–2013	Succeeded by Ignazio La Russa
New political party	National coordinator of Brothers of Italy; 2013–2014; 2018–2019	Succeeded by Giovanni Donzelli; Office abolished
Political offices
Preceded by Paolo Lampertico	Mayor of Marene; 1990–2004	Succeeded by Edoardo Giuseppe Pelissero
Preceded by N/A	Member of the Chamber of Deputies; 2001–2013; 2018–2019	Succeeded by N/A; Lucrezia Mantovani
Preceded by Lorenzo Guerini	Minister of Defence; 2022–present	Incumbent
