= 2024 European Parliament election in Lombardy =

The 2024 European Parliament election in Italy took place in Italy on 8–9 June 2024. In the Italian region of Lombardy, the ruling party Brothers of Italy came first with 31.8% of the vote, followed by the Democratic Party (22.6%) and the League (13.1%), represented by the Lombard League in the region, which reflected its right-leaning status as the centre-left coalition, informally known as the Progressive Camp, plus all the remaining parliamentary opposition and left-leaning parties, achieved 44.6% of the votes compared to the 54.2% of the governing parties. Under double digits were the electoral list of Forza Italia and Us Moderates (9.3%), the Greens and Left Alliance (6.8%), the Five Star Movement (5.7%), and Action (4.0%). Below the national electoral threshold of 4% were United States of Europe (3.7%), Peace Land Dignity (1.8%), Freedom (0.7%), Popular Alternative (0.3%), and Valdostan Rally (0.2%).

== Results ==
Party	Votes	%
Brothers of Italy	1,336,243	31.8
Democratic Party	951,330	22.6
League	550,171	13.1
Forza Italia–Us Moderates	391,411	9.3
Greens and Left Alliance	285,069	6.8
Five Star Movement	238,448	5.7
Action	168,972	4.0
United States of Europe	156,847	3.7
Peace Land Dignity	77,261	1.8
Freedom	27,277	0.7
Popular Alternative	13,898	0.3
Valdostan Rally	6,400	0.2
Total	4,203,327	100.00

Source: Ministry of the Interior

== See also ==
- 2024 European Parliament election in Piedmont
