= Giovanni Crosetto =

Italian politician (born 1990)

Giovanni Crosetto MEP
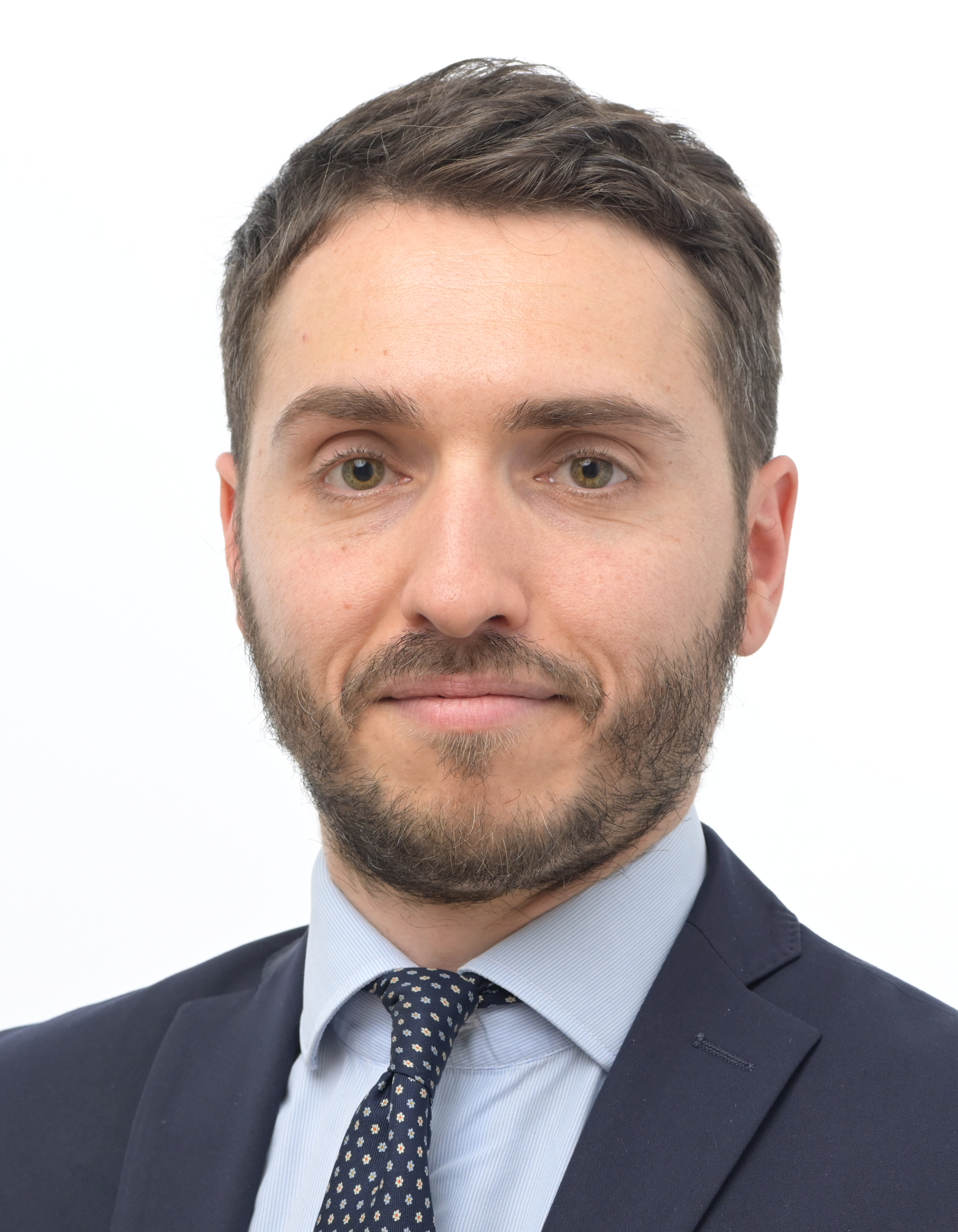
- Crosetto in 2024

Member of the European Parliament
- Incumbent
- Assumed office 16 July 2024
- Constituency: North-West Italy

Member of the City Council of Turin
- In office 27 October 2021 – 9 January 2026
- Succeeded by: Emilio Iodice

Personal details
- Born: 12 August 1990 (age 36) Savigliano, Italy
- Party: Brothers of Italy
- Other political affiliations: European Conservatives and Reformists Party
- Relatives: Guido Crosetto (uncle)
- Education: University of Turin

Giovanni Crosetto (born 12 August 1990) is an Italian politician who is a member of the European Parliament (MEP) since 16 July 2024. A member of Brothers of Italy (FdI), he sits with the European Conservatives and Reformists Group (ECR Group). He was the sole candidate elected in the 2024 European Parliament election in Piedmont. Earlier in 2021, he was elected to the City Council of Turin, serving as FdI's group leader and representing its moderate wing.

== Early life and family ==
Crosetto was born on 12 August 1990 in Savigliano, in the Italian region of Piedmont. He is the nephew of Guido Crosetto, who began his career in Christian Democracy (DC), represents the moderate wing of FdI, and describes himself as a Christian democrat and anti-fascist (unlike other FdI members), and is the defence minister in the Meloni government. The young Crosetto was often quoted as saying: "I'm lucky to have a truly paternal relationship with my uncle, he's a teacher, he gives me advice and shows me the path to follow." He belongs to the dynasty of trailer builders of the Crosetto family. He studied Economics at the University of Turin. Crosetto had moved to Turin in order to attend university, graduating with a laurea magistrale in Economics and Business, and subsequently began his professional career as a business consultant.

== City Council of Turin ==
Crosetto began his political career after his uncle co-founded FdI in 2012, and remained a key party figure in subsequent years. In the 2021 Turin municipal election on 3–4 October, he was elected with 1,002 preferential votes to the City Council of Turin, where he served as group leader of FdI since being inaugurated on 27 October. During the electoral campaign, his surname (written in capital letters but without his first name or photo) appeared on the six-by-three-meter electoral posters, and Crosetto clarified: "Until now, I've pursued my passion for politics as an activist, this is the first election campaign where I'm personally involved. On the one hand, it's an honor to carry on the family legacy, but on the other, it's a responsibility because I feel all eyes are on me: I'm working double-time to achieve a good result and not disappoint expectations."

Since his election to the City Council of Turin, Crosetto was nicknamed the "Nephew of Italy" (nipote d'Italia). In a 24 December 2025 post on social media, after some rumours, Crosetto announced his resignation as a member of the City Council of Turin in order to focus on his role as MEP. His resignation, presented through a letter on 23 December, was officially accepted by the City Council of Turin on 9 January 2026, and Crosetto (from the province of Cuneo) was succeeded by Emilio Iodice (from the province of Novara), who was the first of non-elected FdI candidates. Although the two roles were compatible and thus he was not required to resign, Crosetto explained: "They asked me to dedicate my full commitment to European action, so this decision is necessary."

== Member of the European Parliament ==
Crosetto was among the FdI candidates for the 2024 European Parliament election. While in 2019 the region of Piedmont elected three MEPs, this was reduced to one in 2024 as Crosetto (one of the four FdI leading candidates in Piedmont as the party regional vice-coordinator Paolo Bongiovanni told the Corriere della Sera) was the sole Piedmontese candidate elected to the European Parliament. In the 2024 European Parliament election in Italy, he was elected with around 34,000 preferential votes in the North-East Italy constituency, of which 19,643 in Piedmont.

Since his inauguration as a MEP of the ECR Group on 16 July 2024, Crosetto became a member of the European Parliament Committee on Economic and Monetary Affairs, the Delegation for Relations with the Mashreq Countries, and the Delegation to the Parliamentary Assembly of the Union for the Mediterranean. He was also substitute member of the Delegation to the European Union–Mexico Joint Parliamentary Committee, and the Delegation for Relations with the Pan-African Parliament.

== Political views and positions ==
In line with his uncle's politics, Crosetto represents the more moderate or liberal wing of FdI and is critic of apology of fascism. For example, he condemned the commemorations of the Acca Larentia killings with the fascist salute. As he openly condemned the dozens of Roman salutes at the Acca Larentia rally, calling it a "chilling apologia for fascism", this displeased the nostalgic FdI members of the neo-fascist Italian Social Movement (MSI). An anti-fascist, he also criticised fellow party members who took part at the presentation of the controversial book of Roberto Vannacci. Crosetto is opposed to cultured meat, which he once called "junk", and supports the pro-Atlanticist (atlantismo, reflecting pro-NATO positions in Italian) and pro-Israel line in debates on international issues. In December 2025, amid divisions within the centre-right coalition over Maurizio Marrone (Regional Councilor for Social Policies in the government of Alberto Cirio) as the mayor of Turin candidate for the 2027 Turin municipal election, he called for the selection of a moderate and not appear as football ultras. His views were echoed by both Forza Italia (FI) and Lega Piemonte (LP) through foreign minister Antonio Tajani and Fabrizio Ricca (local and regional LP councillor), who respectively cited the need for a more reassuring figure amid the eviction of the Askatasuna social centre and Turin's anti-fascist history.

After announcing and explaining his resignation from the City Council of Turin, Crosetto praised the decision to evict the Askatasuna social centre, stating: "I believe that, now more than ever, Turin is at a crossroads and must choose what kind of city it wants to be. The incomprehensible and dangerous collaboration pact with a dangerous and violent organization like the Askatasuna social centre, followed by the historic eviction carried out by the Meloni government, offers the centre-right a real and concrete opportunity in terms of contestability in the upcoming local elections." Crosetto expressed his belief that moderatism was key to win the historically left-leaning city of Turin, stating: "There is a whole moderate world, one that firmly believes in democratic principles and consequently believes in and recognizes the principles of legality. This world cannot help but find this pact unnatural, something that does not represent it. The centre-right has a real chance to tap into that world, reaching the numbers needed to win the local elections. To tap into that moderate and undecided vote, it's not hard to understand that an equally moderate candidate capable of channeling that consensus is needed."

Of Turin, Crosetto said that the city "deserves a ruling class capable of understanding its problems and proposing new solutions, and it deserves institutional representatives who represent the interests of all Turin residents, not of a single political party or ideology." He lamented the industrial decline of the city and called for reconstruction of the historic automotive industry, stating: "The industrial revolution is another of those battles that the entire centre-right must have the strength, foresight, and courage to carry forward. We're talking about putting all jobs, direct and indirect, in the automotive sector and its related industries at risk, and everything we can do to prevent this. We must have the courage to say that these decisions were wrong and that we need to take a step back. Our country's loss of competitiveness is a problem that goes beyond the city limits, but that doesn't mean we can't activate the levers needed to restart growth at the local level."
