= Ukrecoresursy =

State Enterprise «Ukrecoresursy”
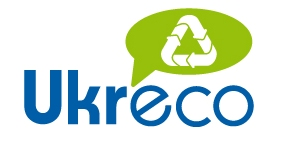
- Company type: State Enterprise
- Founded: 1998
- Headquarters: Kyiv, Ukraine
- Key people: Dmitriy Radionov, Director
- Website: uecr.gov.ua

Ukrecoresursy (Ukrainian: Укрекоресурси, full name “State Enterprise for Managing Waste as Secondary Raw Materials”) is a Government of Ukraine state enterprise that provides waste recycling services. It was established by government decree on 26 July 2001.

The company provides waste collection system, under which the waste is sorted and sent for recycling.

Ukraine produces approximately 13 million tonnes of solid waste. Of this, more than 4 million tonnes consists of used packaging materials, which together with the other solid waste, are buried at the 4,469 landfills and waste dumps. Ukraine's landfills are overtaxed, with 314 (7%) of them are overloaded and 897 (20%) not meeting the requirements of environmental safety. The total area of landfills and dumps is 8,106.3 hectares (31.299 sq mi).

In 2010 in Europe, on average, only 39.8% of the solid waste was placed in landfills, while in Ukraine this number was 93%. To achieve its objectives, Ukrekoresursy are charged with the following tasks:

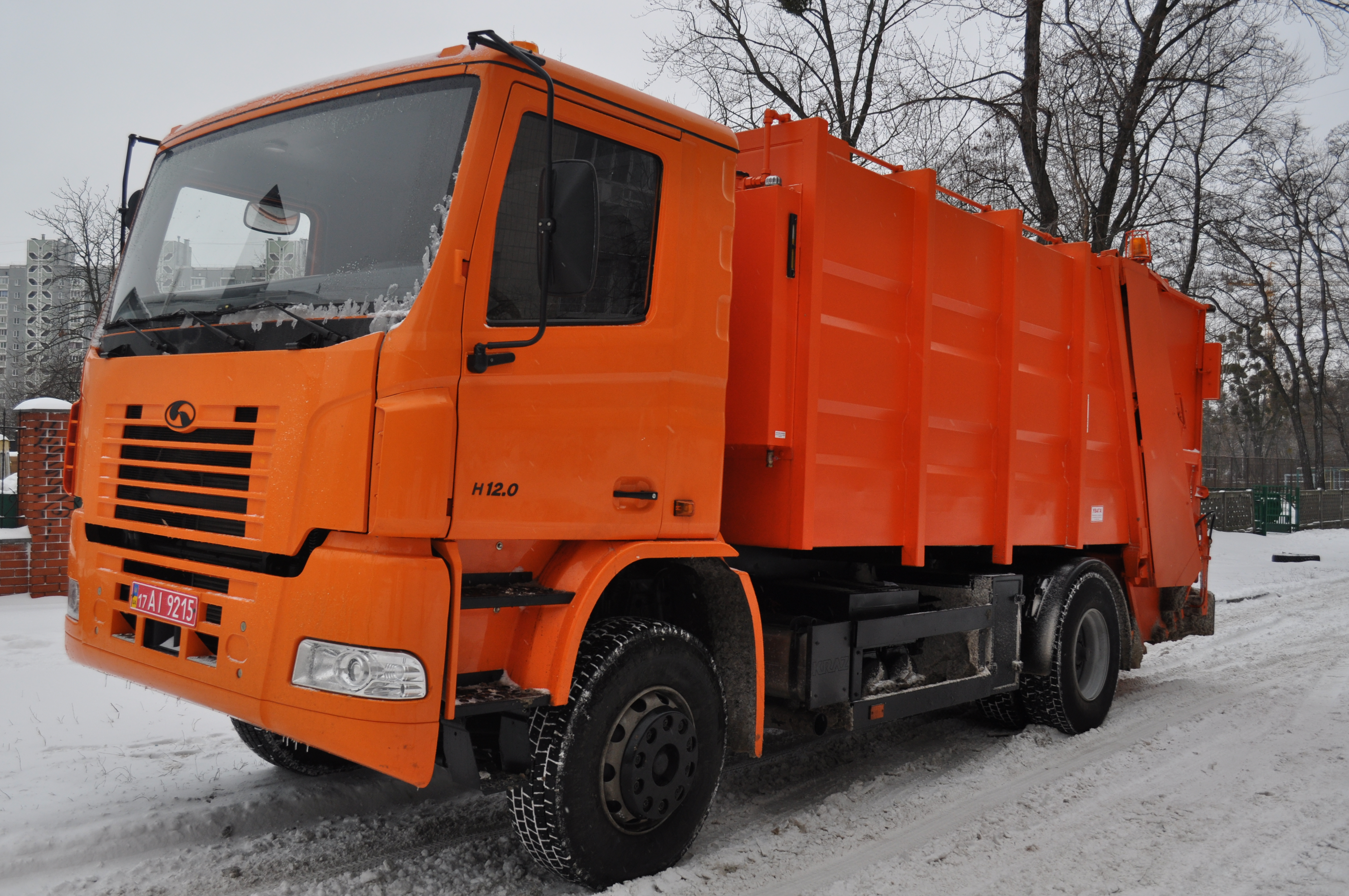
Garbage truck of the company

- To establish and maintain the proper functioning of the system of collection, preparation and utilization of wastes as secondary raw materials;
- To review and improvement the existing systems of collection, preparation and recycling of waste;
- To monitor the volume of packaging waste (packaging) in accordance to the established minimum standards, bringing the actual volumes of waste regulations;
- To implement environmental security in accordance to the requirements of EU Directive 94/62/EC on packaging and packaging waste and the European system of packaging waste «PRO EUROPE».

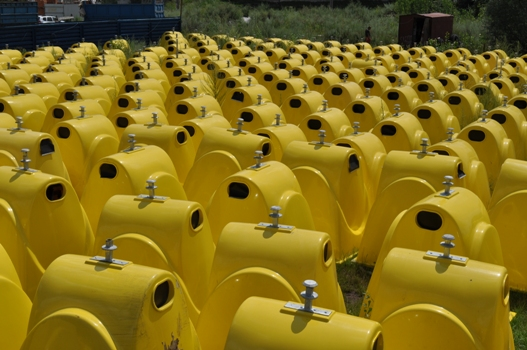
Sorting garbage cans

The company and its territorial subdivisions ensure the fulfillment of tasks assigned to them, due to receipt of funds into a special account of the Treasury, designed to organize data collection, preparation and disposal of used containers and packaging materials according to the Decree of Cabinet of Ministers № 915.

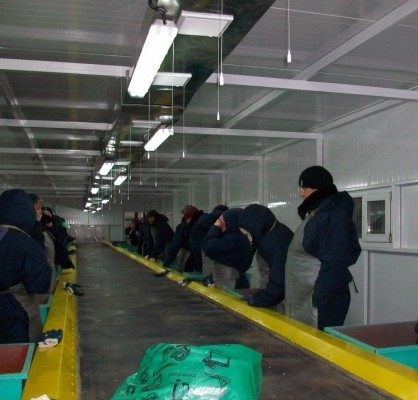
Sorting garbage plant

The use of these funds in a manner and in areas defined by the Decree of Cabinet of Ministers of Ukraine of 20.01.2010 № 39 "On approval of the use of funds received as payment for services on the organization of the collection, preparation and disposal of used packaging materials and packaging," in particular :

- Purchase of special equipment, machinery, tools for collecting, preparation and recycling of waste;
- Developing a system for collecting, harvesting and recycling of packaging materials and containers in the regions of Ukraine;
- Creation of the facilities for disposal of wastes as secondary raw materials;
- Development and implementation of investment projects in areas of waste management.

Partners of the State Enterprise “Ukrecoresursy” are:

- central bodies of executive power;
- local authorities and government;
- economic entities of different ownership forms.

== Fair trade issues ==
The establishment of a single state enterprise to oversee waste recycling for the entire country of Ukraine has been cited by The European Business Association and the European Commission's Directorate-General for Trade as a significant barrier to international trade in Ukraine. Ukrecoresursy is seen as a monopoly with no state or public control or oversight, contradicting European free market standards with no obvious reason to do so.
