= Sabine Weyand =

German civil servant

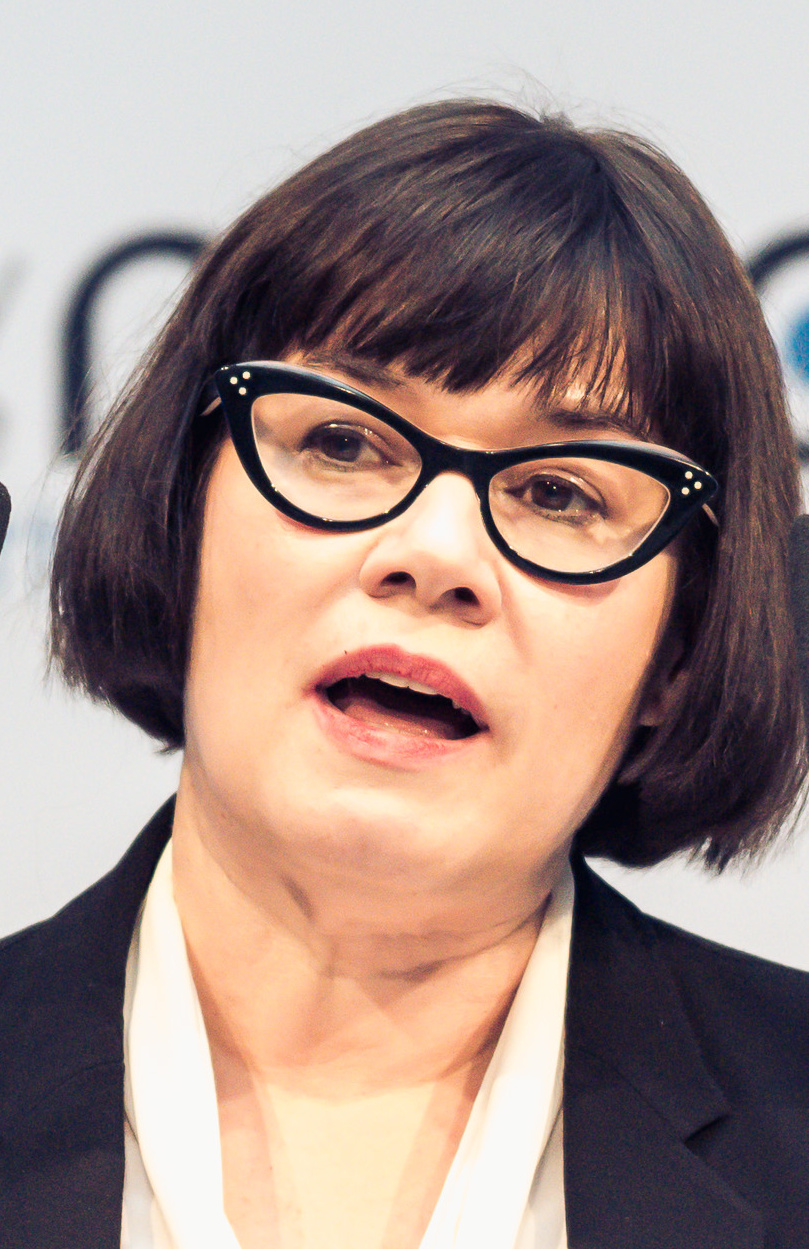

Director-General, Directorate-General for Trade
- Incumbent
- Assumed office 1 June 2019

Sabine Weyand (born 1964) is a European Union senior official from Germany. She has played a prominent role in trade negotiations, as an EU co-negotiator for the TTIP and CETA agreements, and in EU Brexit negotiations.

Since 1 June 2019, Weyand has been the EU Director-General for Trade.

== Early life and education ==
Sabine Weyand, the daughter of Heinrich Weyand (1927–2014) and his wife Magda (née Spurk), was born in Saarland and grew up in Körprich, a district of Nalbach. Her father was surveyor in the surveying office of the Saarlouis district as well as mayor of Körprich for the CDU from 1972 to 1989. She has two older siblings, Wolfgang and Waltraud. Weyand was a student at the University of Freiburg from 1983, studying Political Science, Economics, English and Linguistics, including a year of study at the University of Cambridge from 1986 to 1987. In 1991 she received her diploma in Advanced European Studies from the College of Europe. This was followed by a doctorate in political science from the University of Tübingen, which she received in 1995. The topic of her dissertation was the common transport policy of the EU.

== Career ==
Weyand has worked for the European Commission since 1994. Her first position was in the Directorate-General for Industry, where she worked with the automotive industry outside Europe. From 1997 to 1999 she was in the Foreign Relations Department, where she also dealt with economic issues and prepared for the G7 / G8 Summits. From 1999, she was on the staff of EU Commissioner for Trade Pascal Lamy. She then headed the staff of the Commissioner for Development Assistance and Humanitarian Aid, Louis Michel, from 2004 to 2007. This was followed by a consultant role to Commission President José Manuel Barroso, from 2007 to 2009, where amongst other things she was involved in international climate and energy negotiations.

From 2009 to 2012 Weyand was the representative of the European Commission to the Committee of Permanent Representatives of the Member States (Coreper I). From 2012, she was then director of the EU Secretariat-General responsible for policy coordination. She also dealt with EU international negotiations such as TTIP with the US, CETA with Canada, EU neighbours and the WTO.

In March 2016, Weyand became Deputy Director-General of the Directorate-General for Trade, responsible for Units E (Neighbourhoods, USA and Canada), F (WTO, Legal Affairs and Trade), G (Trade Strategy and Analysis, Market Access) and H (Trade Defence Instruments).

=== EU Deputy Chief Negotiator for the Brexit process ===
In 2016, Weyand was appointed Deputy Chief Negotiator for the Brexit process, acting as second to EU negotiator Michel Barnier, with effect from 1 October.

Following this appointment the Politico news website listed her as one of the ten most influential women in Brussels, while her interaction with her British opposite number Oliver Robbins was described as "the real engine room" of the Brexit process.

Weyand spoke publicly at a European Policy Centre event in January 2019, giving her thoughts on the state of the Brexit negotiations at that time, her opinion on how Theresa May and more broadly the Conservative Party had approached and handled the negotiations, and on how the situation might develop from that date onward.

=== EU Director-general for Trade ===
On 29 May 2019, Weyand was announced as the EU's new Director General for Trade with effect from June 1, replacing Jean-Luc Demarty. On 28 April 2026 it was announced that she would be leaving that post; speculation suggested that this was due to a disagreement with EU Commission president Ursula von der Leyen and trade commissioner Maroš Šefčovič over the recently-struck trade deal between the EU and the United States.

== Other activities ==
- Institute for European Politics (IEP), Member of the Board of Trustees

== Personal life ==
Weyand is married to fellow European Commission official Peter Wagner.
