= Pozzolo =

Pozzolo may refer to:

- Pozzolo Formigaro, municipality in the Province of Alessandria in the Italian region Piedmont
- Emanuele Pozzolo (born 25 August 1985), Italian politician

== See also ==
- Pozzuoli
