= Lisbon Council =

Brussels-based think tank

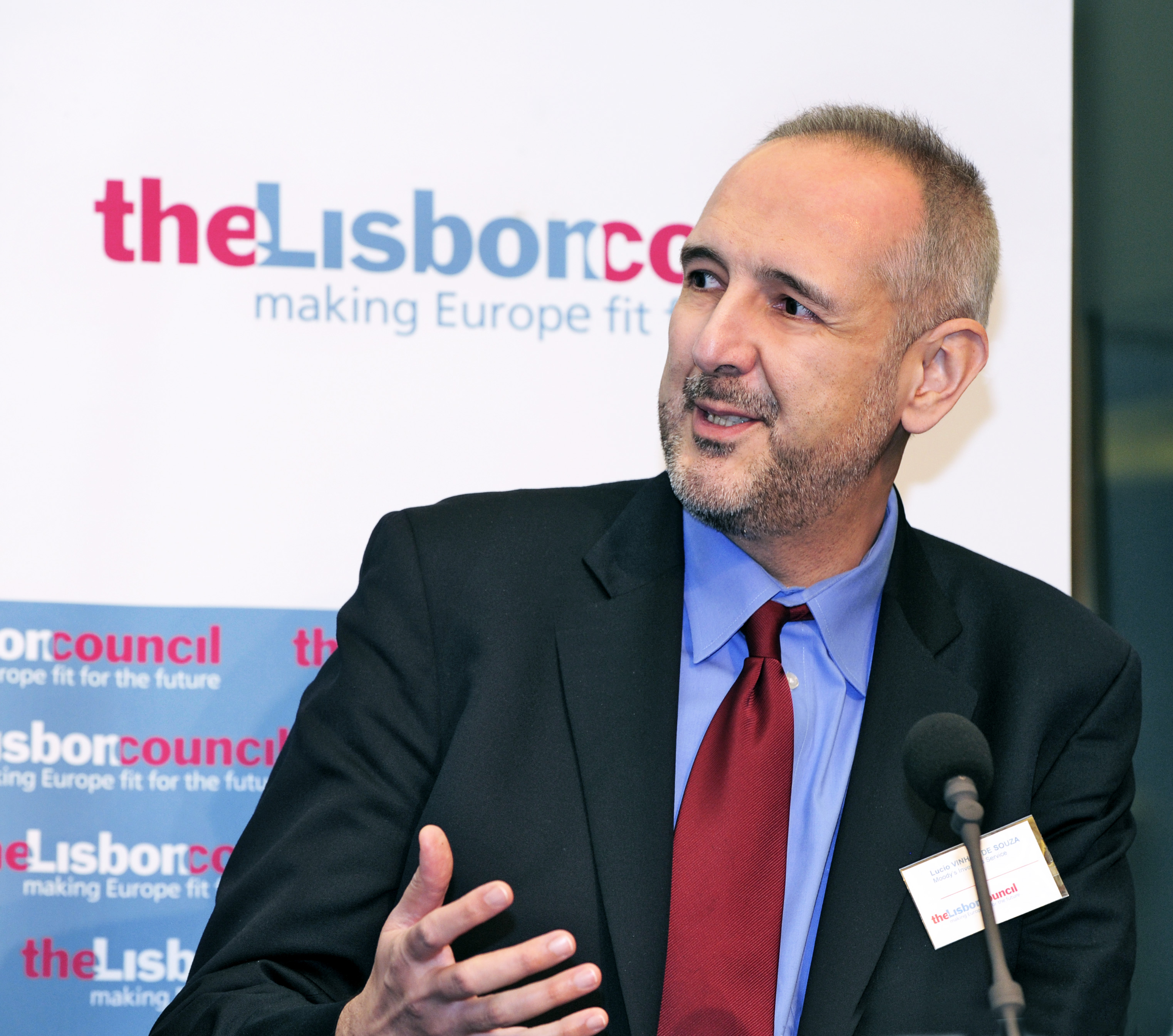
European Commission official Lúcio Vinhas de Souza speaking at a Lisbon Council event

The Lisbon Council is a Brussels-based think tank that focuses on matters of innovation and European competitiveness. As of 2021, its president is Paul Hofheinz, the director of research is David Osimo, and the vice president is Francesco Mureddu.

== Background and activity ==
The Lisbon Council was founded in 2003 by Paul Hofheinz and Ann Mettler. Its name refers to the Lisbon Strategy, adopted by the European Union in 2000 and aiming to make the EU "the most competitive and dynamic knowledge-based economy in the world capable of sustainable economic growth with more and better jobs and greater social cohesion" by 2010.

Its work themes include digital society, digital sovereignty, artificial intelligence, future of work, innovation, innovation-driven growth, R&D, evidence-based policymaking, economy, jobs, sustainability, fiscal sustainability, education and human capital, energy, environment, startups, SMEs, entrepreneurs, the data economy, and the future of Europe.

== See also ==
- Bruegel (think tank)
- Centre for European Policy Studies
- ECIPE
- Eurofi
