= Yukon Huang =

Chinese-American economist

Yukon Huang (born 1944 in Chengdu) is a Chinese-American economist. He is a senior fellow and research associate in the Asia Program at the Carnegie Endowment in Washington, D.C. His areas of research include China's economic and political development and its impact in Asia and globally.

== Life ==
Yukon Huang was born in Chengdu/Sichuan and grew up with his grandfather in Changsha/Hunan. In 1949, his grandfather sent him to the United States, where his parents were studying. He did not see China again until he became the World Bank's country director for China and had his office in Beijing. He attended school in Washington, then the only Chinese among 600 students.

Huang attended Yale University where he earned a BA. This was followed by Master's and Doctoral studies at Princeton University, where he received his Ph.D. in Economics in 1971. The topic of his dissertation was The economics of paddy production in Malaya: an economy in transition.

He held teaching positions at the University of Virginia, the University of Malaysia, and the University of Dar es Salaam.

At the World Bank, he was country director for Russia and the former Soviet republics in Central Asia from 1992 to 1997, and country director for China from 1997 to 2004.

In spring 2010, Huang moved to the Carnegie Endowment for International Peace, where he developed a perspective different from the institutions he had worked for previously.

He is an advisor to the World Bank and the Asian Development Bank.

Huang is considered a key advisor in the joint World Bank and Chinese government report China 2030.

Huang has published on his focus topics in the Foreign Policy, Financial Times, Bloomberg, Foreign Affairs, The National Interest, Caixin, The New York Times, South China Morning Post among others.

He is a co-signer of the public letter China is not an Enemy addressed to Donald Trump as published in The Washington Post on July 3, 2019.

== Views and reception ==
Huang, most recently in his book Cracking the China Conundrum, analyzes "conventional wisdom", typical and widespread misconceptions of China's economy and politics that ignore China's unique characteristics. For Minxin Pei, Huang succeeds in refuting much of the conventional wisdom with his provocative and original insights, "uniquely valuable" in his "combination of empirical evidence and comparative analysis". Dmitriy Plekhanov, senior researcher at the Institute for Complex Strategic Studies, Moscow, comes to the conclusion that Huang scrutinises and deconstructs popular beliefs one by one. Mike Cormack (Los Angeles Review of Books) sees in Huang's book an "authoritative, closely argued, and hugely insightful survey" by a "highly credentialed" expert.

First misconception, in Huang's view, is that U.S. trade problems are driven by China's trade surpluses. The U.S. trade deficit emerged in the late 1990s, he said, while China's massive surpluses only emerged in 2004 and 2005, when it became the center of the global manufacturing network after WTO membership. In the case of the iPhone, for example, only about 5 percent of the phone's value is created in China by assembling parts made outside China, which account for 50 percent of the phone's value. The rest goes to Apple. The main reason for the U.S. deficit, he says, is the dollar as the world's perpetually overvalued reserve currency.

The only way they (foreigners) can hold the dollar is if the U.S. runs a trade deficit. ... The only way to get rid of the trade deficit is to get rid of the U.S. dollar as the world currency."

The second misconception, he says, is that the U.S. is investing too much in China, which is hurting U.S. competitiveness and leading to job losses. U.S. foreign investment in China is going at one or two percent. Europe invests many times that because Europe is a manufacturing center, while the U.S. strength is in services. Apple, for example, leaves manufacturing to Foxconn and makes huge profits by focusing only on the service side (design, distribution, etc.). The third fallacy, according to Huang, is the negative impact of corruption in China on economic growth. In China, he said, corruption drives growth instead of reducing it because China, as a mixed economy, controls resources by the state while the private sector earns high returns from those resources. Corruption transfers the use of resources to private interests in exchange for bribes or gratuities. As a result, investment increases and the economy grows.

"This creates a common interest between the public and private sectors that is not usually present in other systems affected by corruption. Elsewhere, the government official has a vested interest in slowing down business to demand higher bribes. In China, however, as a mixed economy, this incentive is outweighed by a common interest in growth."

China's unbalanced growth is often criticized, but according to Huang, this is the key to China's rapid growth. It is the result of migration from the countryside to the cities, he says, with the new urbanites disproportionately increasing their savings rate as their income increases due to their continued rural mentality. As a result, Huang recommends reforming the "Hukou residence policy," which restricts domestic migrants' access to public goods in cities to which they move. Removing these restrictions would boost consumption by about 2 percent of GDP and offset China's equally large current account surplus.

Huang also believes that China's debt-to-GDP ratio, which has grown since 2009, is not detrimental. The sum of corporate debt, household debt and government debt is about 250 to 260 percent of GNP. This puts China higher than most developing countries, but lower than most developed countries. The speed of debt growth does not lead to economic crisis, he said, because from 2004 to 2014 the value of real estate increased by 600 percent, which was originally close to 0 because it was state-owned. Real estate trading and borrowing to purchase real estate has caused debt to grow, but not GDP, since land sales do not count toward GDP, only labor associated with construction.

The problem of government debt, Huang said, is mainly concentrated in state-owned enterprises in heavy industry and state-owned infrastructure enterprises. This debt, he said, is not really corporate debt, but rather local government debt, that is, a provincial-level budget issue that can be resolved fiscally.

On the issue of intellectual property disrespect and product piracy, Huang pointed out the development dependence and parallels in Western economic history. He made it clear that China has now crossed the threshold of intellectual property protection, meaning that it benefits more from protection than from infringement.

Huang encourages trade agreements between China and the US to the mutual interest of both countries. In his view, the trade war from 2019 to 2021 has been more to the disadvantage of the USA due to multilateral trade and diversification, but both countries have damaged the world trading system.

== Bibliography (selected) ==
- With Indermit S. Gill and Homi Kharas: East Asian Visions. World Bank, January 2007, ISBN 978-0-8213-6745-2
- with Alessandro Magnoli Bocchi: Reshaping Economic Geography in East Asia. 2009, ISBN 978-0-8213-7641-6
- With Ahmad Ahsan, Manolo Abella, Andrew Beath, Manjula Luthria, and Trang Van Nguyen: I International Migration and Development in East Asia and the Pacific. World Bank 2014. ISBN 978-0-8213-9649-0
- Cracking the China Conundrum: Why Conventional Economic Is Wisdom Is Wrong. Oxford 2017.

== Web resources ==
- Yukon Huang: Debunking Myths About China's Economy, World Affairs Council, 02.12.2017
