= Laurence de Richemont =

- Education: Sciences Po, École nationale d'administration
- Occupation: Head of unit
- Years active: 1988–present
- Employer: European Commission
- Organization: Directorate-General for Internal Market, Industry, Entrepreneurship and SMEs
- Spouse: yes
- Children: son (born 2002)
- Awards: Knight of Ordre national du Mérite, Knight of Legion of Honour

Laurence de Richemont is a Head of unit Single Market Service Centre, part of Directorate-General for Internal Market, Industry, Entrepreneurship and SMEs at the European Commission since 2015. During 2010–2014 she was adviser to the cabinet of president of the European Commission, José Manuel Barroso.

For her civil service to France she received titles Knight of Ordre national du Mérite and Knight of Legion of Honour.

== Education ==
In 1982 she graduated from Institute of Political Studies (Service Public) in Paris, and in 1986 from École nationale d'administration (International Relations).

== See also ==
- Directorate-General for Internal Market, Industry, Entrepreneurship and SMEs
