= National Future =

Political party in Italy

National Future Futuro Nazionale
- Abbreviation: FN or FNV
- President: Roberto Vannacci
- Coordinator: Massimiliano Simoni
- Founded: 6 February 2026
- Split from: Lega
- Headquarters: Via in Lucina 17, Rome
- Membership (2026): 160,000+
- Ideology: Ultranationalism; Ultraconservatism; Right-wing populism; Neo-fascism
- Political position: Far-right
- European affiliation: Europe of Sovereign Nations Party
- European Parliament group: Europe of Sovereign Nations Group
- Colours: Dark blue
- Chamber of Deputies: 9 / 400
- Senate: 0 / 205
- European Parliament: 1 / 76
- Regional Councils: 8 / 896

Website
- futuronazionale.it

National Future (Italian: Futuro Nazionale, FN), whose official name is National Future with Roberto Vannacci (Italian: Futuro Nazionale con Roberto Vannacci, FNV) is a far-right political party in Italy that was formed in February 2026. Its leader is Roberto Vannacci, a retired general in the Italian Army who is currently a member of the European Parliament (MEP).

== History ==
Towards 2025, rumours began circulating that MEP Roberto Vannacci, a former general of the Italian Army, was considering a break from the League, which he was then secretary of, to pursue an independent political project. In late 2025, he promoted a network of political committees and associations known as The World Upside Down (Il Mondo al Contrario), named after his 2023 book and developed as an organisational base for his political activism. Originally conceived as a cultural association to promote Vannacci's ideas, the network grew rapidly across Italy with dozens of local team committees established to articulate his political vision and mobilise supporters.

Speculations intensified in January 2026 after Vannacci registered the trademark and symbol for a proposed political movement called National Future with the European intellectual property authorities, suggesting plans to create a distinct party. On 3 February 2026, Vannacci formally left the League, ending his affiliation with the party after months of internal tensions over his political positions, and launched his new party's manifesto. On the same day, other prominent members of the League, such as former MEP and long-time representative of the party's right wing Mario Borghezio, as well as Tuscan regional councillor Massimiliano Simoni, joined the new movement. On the following day, Emanuele Pozzolo, a former member of Brothers of Italy (FdI) expelled in 2025, became the first deputy to join FN.

On 6 February, FN was officially registered as a party: Vannacci became its president and leader, while Simoni was appointed coordinator. On the same day, deputies Edoardo Ziello and Rossano Sasso left the League, joining National Future. On 11 February 2026, the three "futurist" deputies, as labelled by Vannacci himself, voted in favour of the confidence motion in the Meloni government but opposed the decree authorising further military aid to Ukraine.

On 24 February, Vannacci, as FN's lone MEP, announced that he would seek to join the Europe of Sovereign Nations Group, calling the Meloni government "not right-wing enough", but cited voting in favour of the confidence motion as the government being the "least worst option". However, after a few weeks, on 31 March, the three FN deputies voted against the confidence vote on the Meloni government. On the same day, the radical-right and ultraconservative movement Independence, led by former mayor of Rome Gianni Alemanno, joined FN. On 19 May, another prominent member of the League in the Chamber of Deputies, Laura Ravetto, left the group to join National Future.

On 23 May, Vannacci announced via Twitter that the party had reached 60,000 registered members, increasing from the 12,000 reported in March. The membership included 2,000 registrants in Calabria, 1,700 in Sardinia, and more than 1,300 in Piedmont as of 4 April. The party allegedly reached 80,000 members on 30 May. On 28 May, FN has established its autonomous sub-group within the Mixed Group, thanks to an agreement with Free, a list that ran in the 2022 general election, receiving 829 votes. Free's leader Marco Lusetti became the coordinator of FN in Reggio Emilia, while Ziello became the party's leader in the Chamber of Deputies and vicepresident of the Mixed Group. On 6 June, four more deputies joined FN: Domenico Furgiuele and Gianangelo Bof from the League, Davide Bergamini and Attilio Pierro from Forza Italia. Also Antonio Maria Rinaldi, former Lega MEP, joined the party.

During the 2026 Italian local elections, also held in Vigevano on 24 and 25 May , Furio Suvilla ran for mayor with FN list "Future Vigevano", coming fourth with 14.21% of the vote in the first round; he did not qualify for the runoff, but was elected as the list's lone councillor in the city. On 13 and 14 June, the National Constituent Assembly of FN was held in Rome. The assembly formally established the party's organizational structure and political platform. On 8 August, Gianmarco Medusei, regional councillor for Liguria and former president of the Regional Council of Liguria, joined the party. In September, FN fielded Domenico Giannetta (a regional councillor who had recently left Forza Italia) as its candidate in the by-election held to fill Reggio Calabria's single-member seat in the Chambers of Deputies. Giannetta received around 11% of the votes and placed third after centre-right candidate Fabio Roscioli and centre-left candidate Frank Benedetto.

== Ideology ==
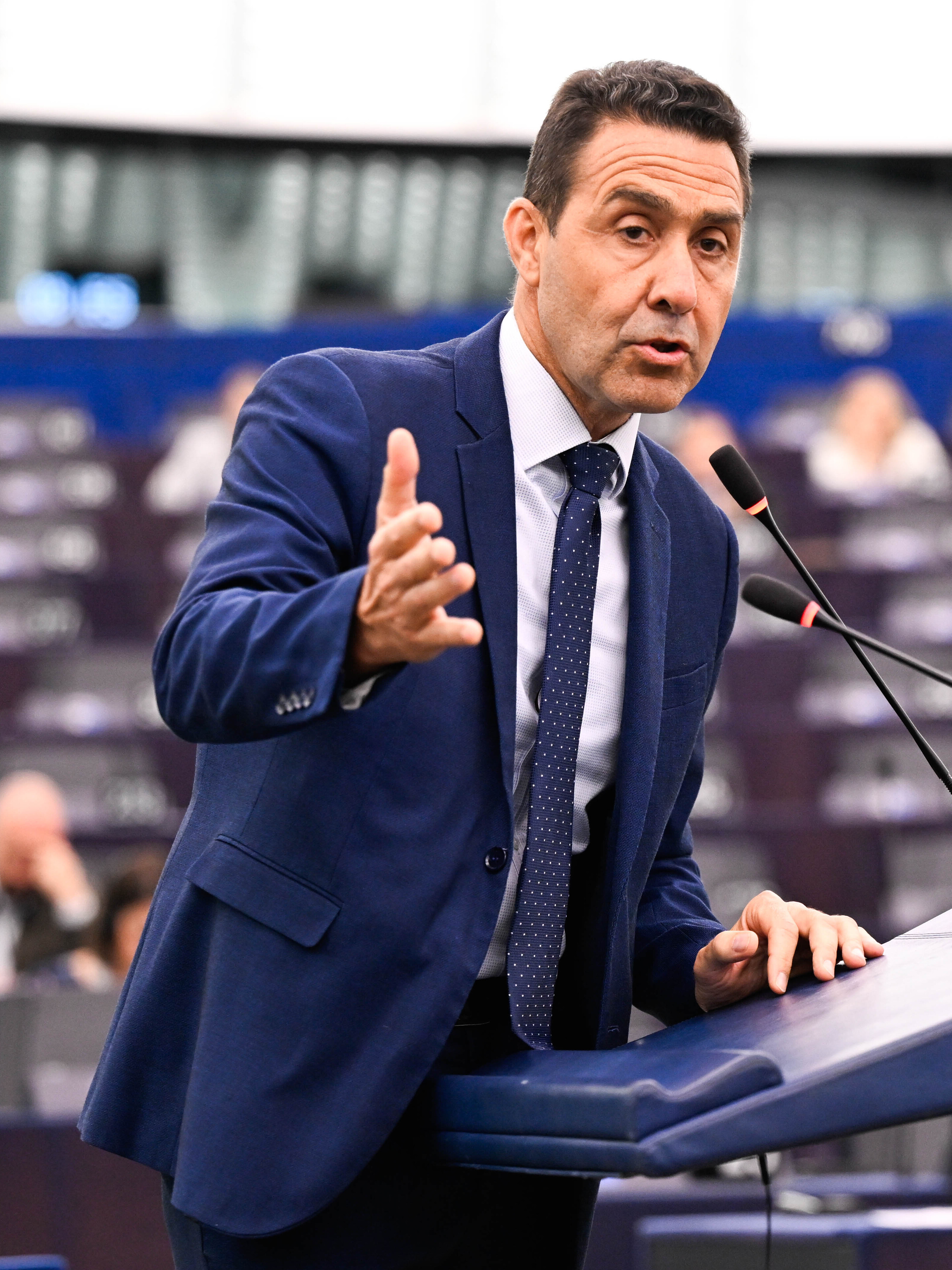
Roberto Vannacci in 2025

National Future is a far-right, ultranationalist, ultraconservative, and right-wing populist political party, whose ideologies are strictly linked to the views of its leader, Roberto Vannacci. Its ideological framework emphasises national identity, sovereigntism and sovereignty, traditional values, social conservatism, and a strong conception of cultural homogeneity. The party presents itself as an uncompromising form of right-wing politics, rejecting political moderation and what it characterises as ideological convergence with the political left. Vannacci himself described the party as "radical right".

The party's name had been linked to the Futurist movement of Filippo Tommaso Marinetti, and Vannacci himself frequently referred to its members as "Futurists". Rossano Sasso distanced the party from the earlier Future and Freedom and emphasized that FN being a natural ally of the centre-right coalition.

=== Social issues ===
Central to the movement's platform is the concept of national identity, defined in ethnic, cultural, and historical terms. The party references Italy's Roman heritage and Christian roots as foundational elements of the nation, portraying Italian civilisation as the product of classical Roman law, Christian tradition, and European historical development. According to its manifesto, national borders are to be strictly defended, and the interests of the Italian people are placed above those of institutions or supranational entities. The movement adopts a strongly anti-immigration stance, arguing that mass immigration undermines social cohesion and weakens national identity. While distinguishing between criminal and non-criminal migration, the party maintains that large-scale immigration dilutes cultural unity. It promotes policies of remigration for individuals who do not assimilate into Italian cultural norms and values, as well as an ethno-essentialist conception of citizenship.

FN advances a traditionalist vision of society, particularly regarding family structure. The party defines the family as exclusively based on a heterosexual union between a man and a woman, presenting this model as rooted in biology and nature. It rejects alternative family forms and criticises what it views as progressive social ideologies, including LGBTQ rights movements. On civil liberties, the movement supports expansive rights of self-defense, arguing that individuals should be entitled to use force to protect their property and personal safety. Economically and culturally, the party promotes the pursuit of excellence over egalitarianism, criticising policies it associates with social levelling and welfare state dependency. It frames national success as dependent on merit, discipline, and enthusiasm rather than equality of outcomes.

=== Economy ===
National Future supports small and medium-sized property ownership and small and medium-sized enterprises, in opposition to the concentration of ownership under both communist systems and "unrestrained" capitalism. The party's programme gives priority to reducing the tax burden, particularly the tax wedge, alongside a more targeted effort to combat tax evasion. It also proposes the introduction of a "genuine family quotient" as a fundamental criterion for applying tax progressivity, as well as a "single flat tax rate" for small and medium-sized enterprises. The party has also proposed the "Tricolour Mortgage", a state-guaranteed loan for Italian families purchasing their first home, and a family allowance combined with a substantial reduction in income tax for each child.

In monetary policy, the programme devotes a section to "monetary sovereignty", echoing arguments commonly advanced by advocates of a return to the lira, while explicitly acknowledging the risks associated with leaving the euro area. FN also criticises the European Stability and Growth Pact endorsed by the Meloni government. The party repeatedly emphasises the importance of using the so-called "golden power", the instrument through which the government can restrict or prohibit market transactions deemed to pose a risk to national security, and proposes the establishment of a Sovereign Fund for National Growth to support Italian infrastructure, energy and businesses.

Regarding welfare, the party supports the view that social benefits should be "primarily reserved for Italian citizens."

=== Relationship with fascism ===
National Future has frequently been accused by political opponents, journalists, and other observers of making references to fascist ideology, rhetoric, and symbolism, as well as of maintaining positions that have been interpreted as sympathetic to aspects of Italy's fascist past. The party has rejected such characterisations, while some of its statements and actions have prompted controversy over its relationship with fascism and the legacy of Benito Mussolini's regime.

The party's communications often contain explicit and laudatory references to fascist slogans, including numerous references to the Xª Flottiglia MAS. Following the controversy, the party subsequently clarified that it had intended to refer to the military unit of the Regia Marina prior to its transformation into a fascist militia. Other examples include the use of the term "comrades" (camerati), as well as revisionist interpretations of the establishment of the fascist regime in Italy and of the 1938 racial laws. The party has refused to celebrate Liberation Day on 25 April, arguing that Italy was liberated only by the Allies and not also by the Italian Resistance. FN also took part, by sending representatives, in the neo-Nazi demonstration held on 3 September 2026 and organised by Veneto Fronte Skinheads.

In an AI-generated video published by Vannacci on his social media accounts in July 2026, he was depicted dressed as a Roman emperor and seated in an imperial setting. In the video, he received a fasces, symbol of imperial power and rule, and subsequently ordered the deaths of former Prime Ministers Giuseppe Conte and Romano Prodi, Democratic Party secretary Elly Schlein and former President of the Chamber of Deputies Laura Boldrini. The video generated controversy because of its use of fascist imagery and its depiction of the deaths of prominent political opponents.

In September 2026, following a complaint filed on 28 August by a military trade union with the military prosecutor's office and a second complaint submitted to the ordinary judiciary, investigations were opened into the presence of members of the Italian Armed Forces within the organisational structure of the movement, possible violations of the Scelba Law concerning the alleged reconstitution of the Fascist Party, incitement to hatred, and political influence attributed to Russian interference. On 5 September 2026, during a debate at the 52nd edition of the Ambrosetti Forum in Cernobbio, former Prime Minister and lifetime senator Mario Monti directly addressed Vannacci, stating that the movement's positions and programme represented "the reconstitution of the narrative, rhetoric, and spirit of fascism".

== Leadership ==
- President: Roberto Vannacci (2026–present)
- Coordinator: Massimiliano Simoni (2026–present)
- Organisational Secretary and Treasurer: Edoardo Ziello (2026–present)
- Membership Secretary: Annamaria Frigo (2026–present)
- Party leader in the Chamber of Deputies: Edoardo Ziello (2026–present)
- Party leader in the European Parliament: Roberto Vannacci (2026–present)

== Sources ==
- La Malfa, Alberto; Lucidi, Samuele (2026). "Is There Life to the Right of the Radical Right? Futuro Nazionale with Vannacci in the Rebirth of the Italian Extreme Right". Frontiers in Political Science. 8. doi:10.3389/fpos.2026.1906873.
- Futuro Nazionale entry (in Italian) in the Enciclopedia Treccani, 2026
