= EU Foreign Subsidies Regulation =

The Foreign Subsidies Regulation (FSR) is the EU's response to foreign subsidies not tackled by the World Trade Organization (WTO) framework, notably from China. It aims to prevent subsidies that distort trading conditions. Starting on 12 July 2023, companies receiving distortive amounts of subsidies from non-EU countries can no longer take part in large company mergers that would affect the EU internal market. Furthermore, these companies can no longer obtain large public procurement contracts in the EU.

The mergers affecting the internal market must be notified to the European Commission's competition branch (DG COMP), whereas the large public contracts must be notified to the internal market directorate (DG GROW). DG GROW can also itself initiate investigations of any kind of distortive subsidies, so-called ex-officio investigations.

The Foreign Subsidies Regulation sits within a broader toolkit consisting of the EU subsidy ("state aid") control, the EU FDI screening framework, and the WTO Agreement on Subsidies and Countervailing Measures.
