= Jorna =

Jorna is a surname from various countries. Notable people include:

- Gijs Jorna (born 1989), Dutch male volleyball player
- Kerstin Jorna, German lawyer

== See also ==
- Jorna, the German-name for Daisy Mae in Animal Crossing: New Horizons.
