= Directorate-General for Trade =

The Directorate-General for Trade (DG TRADE) is a Directorate-General of the European Commission. The European Commission's Directorate- General for Trade (DG Trade) develops and implements the EU's trade policy in order to help secure prosperity, solidarity and security in Europe and around the globe. It covers a wide area from manufactured goods to services, intellectual property and investment.

As of 1 June 2019 Sabine Weyand is the Director-General. The DG Trade reports to the European Commissioner for Trade.

In 2020 it had 694 employees.

Under the authority in the von der Leyen Commission I of Executive-Vice President Valdis Dombrovskis, the European Commissioner for Trade, DG TRADE coordinates trade relations between the European Union (EU) and the rest of the world.

== Organisation ==
- European Commissioner for Trade
- Director General
  - Directorate A - Multilateral Affairs, Strategy, Analysis, Evaluation
      - Unit A1 - Multilateral affairs and WTO
      - Unit A2 - Trade Strategy
      - Unit A3 - Chief Economist, Trade Analysis and Evaluation
  - Deputy Director General
    - Directorate B - Asia (I), Services and Digital Trade, Investment and Intellectual Property
      - Unit B1 - Far East
      - Unit B2 - Services and Digital Trade
      - Unit B3 - Investment and Intellectual Property
      - Unit B001 - Trade Section in the EU Delegation to China
      - Unit B002 - Trade Section in the EU Delegation to Japan
    - Directorate C - Africa, Caribbean and Pacific, Asia (II), Trade and Sustainable Development, Green Deal
      - Unit C1 - African, Caribbean and Pacific, Overseas Countries and Territories
      - Unit C2 - South and South East Asia, Australia, New Zealand
      - Unit C3 - Bilateral relations in Trade and Sustainable Development, Generalised Scheme of Preferences
      - Unit C4 - Multilateral Trade and Sustainable Development Policy, Green Deal, Conflict Minerals
  - Deputy Director General
    - Directorate D - The Americas, Agriculture and Food Safety
      - Unit D1 - US, Canada
      - Unit D2 - Latin America
      - Unit D3 - Agriculture, Food and Sanitary and Phytosanitary matters
      - Unit D001 - Trade Section in the EU Delegation to the US
    - Directorate E - Neighbouring Countries, Industry, Goods, Regulatory Cooperation and Public Procurement
      - Unit E1 - Europe and Eastern Neighbourhood
      - Unit E2 - Southern neighbours, Middle East, Turkey, Russia and Central Asia
      - Unit E3 - Industry, Goods, Energy, Customs and Origin
      - Unit E4 - Regulatory cooperation and Public procurement
  - Deputy Director General
    - Directorate F - Enforcement, Market Access, SMEs, Legal affairs, Technology and Security
      - Unit F1 - Single entry point for enforcement, Market access and SMEs
      - Unit F2 - Dispute Settlement and Legal aspects of trade policy
      - Unit F3 - Legal aspects of trade and sustainable development and investment
      - Unit F4 - Technology and Security, FDI Screening
    - Directorate G - Trade Defence
      - Unit G1 - General Policy, WTO Relations, Relations with Industry
      - Unit G2 - Investigations I. Relations with Member States for Trade Defence matters
      - Unit G3 - Investigations II. Anti-circumvention
      - Unit G4 - Investigations III. Monitoring of implementation
      - Unit G5 - Investigations IV. Relations with third countries for Trade Defence matters
  - Directorate R - Resources, Inter-Institutional Relations, Communications and Civil Society
    - Unit R1 - Resources, HR Business Correspondent and Planning
    - Unit R2 - Interinstitutional Relations, Policy and Briefing Coordination
    - Unit R3 - Transparency, Civil Society and Communication
    - Unit R4 - Information technology and IT systems

== See also ==
- World Trade Organization
- General Agreement on Tariffs and Trade
