= Jo Cornu =

Belgian engineer and business executive (born 1944)

- Born: 1944 (age 81–82)
- Education: Katholieke Universiteit Leuven (M.S.); Carlton University (Ph.D.)
- Occupations: Engineer, business executive

Jozef Cornu (born 1944) is a Belgian engineer and business executive, and former CEO of the National Railway Company of Belgium.

== Biography ==
Cornu graduated as Master of Science in electrical engineering and mechanics at the Katholieke Universiteit Leuven and he obtained a PhD in electronics at the Carlton University in Ottawa, Canada. From 1981 to 1983 he attended the Postgraduate Program Business-executive at the Antwerp Management School.

From 1982 up to 1984 Cornu was CEO of Mietec in Oudenaarde and afterwards General Manager of Bell Telephone until 1987. From 1988 up to 1995 he was a member of the Executive Board committee of Alcatel plc and from 1995 up to 1999 COO of Alcatel Telecom. Afterwards he became President of the Board of Directors of Alcatel.

Since 2005 Jo Cornu is President of ISTAG-group (Information Society Technologies Advisory Group) of the European Commission. In 2005, he was a member of the group which wrote the Aho report. From 1 December 2007 to 27 April 2010 he was CEO of Agfa-Gevaert.

== Selected publications ==
- Jo Cornu, Struisvogels vliegen niet, Lannoo, 1996
