= Attilio Pierro =

Italian politician (born 1974)

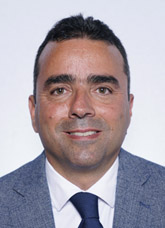
- Pierro in 2022

Member of the Chamber of Deputies
- Incumbent
- Assumed office 13 October 2022
- Constituency: Campania 2 – U07

Personal details
- Born: 10 November 1974 (age 51)
- Party: Lega (until 2026); Forza Italia (2026); National Future (2026-present)

Attilio Pierro (born 10 November 1974) is an Italian politician serving as a member of the Chamber of Deputies since 2022. From 2020 to 2022, he was a member of the Regional Council of Campania. In 2026, he left Lega and joined Forza Italia, and later National Future.
