= Rossano Sasso =

Italian politician (born 1975)

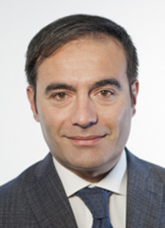
- Sasso in 2018

Member of the Chamber of Deputies
- Incumbent
- Assumed office 23 March 2018
- Constituency: Apulia – P02 (2018–2022); Apulia – U06 (2022–present)

Personal details
- Born: 18 June 1975 (age 51)
- Party: FN (since 2026)
- Other party: Lega (2018–2026)

Rossano Sasso (born 18 June 1975) is an Italian politician serving as a member of the Chamber of Deputies since 2018. From 2021 to 2022, he served as undersecretary of the Ministry of Public Education.
