= Il mondo al contrario =

2023 book by Roberto Vannacci

- 2023 edition
- Author: Roberto Vannacci
- Language: Italian
- Subject: Essay; Political manifesto
- Publisher: Amazon Kindle Direct Publishing
- Publication date: 10 August 2023
- Publication place: Italy
- Media type: Print
- Pages: 373
- ISBN: 979-8854698795

Il mondo al contrario (lit. 'The world upside down') is a book by Italian general Roberto Vannacci, published in 2023. The public debate surrounding the book contributed to Vannacci's growing visibility and marked the beginning of his political career. In 2024, he was elected as a Member of the European Parliament with the League, before later becoming leader of his own political movement, National Future, in 2026.

== Contents ==
The book addresses a number of controversial social and political issues, organized into chapters covering different aspects of contemporary society:

- Society and normality: Vannacci argues that contemporary society is reversing traditional values due to the influence of minority groups, which he claims have altered the majority's perception of what is "normal". He advocates a return to what he describes as "common sense", rooted in traditional values.
- Environmentalism: while acknowledging the existence of anthropogenic climate change, Vannacci criticizes mainstream environmental policies and argues for a pragmatic approach to the energy transition, including the use of nuclear power.
- Animal rights: the author criticizes what he sees as an excessive emphasis on animal welfare over human needs and opposes the anthropomorphization of companion animals, arguing that human interests should take precedence.
- Immigration: Vannacci expresses concern about multiculturalism, describing it as a threat to social cohesion, and advocates cultural assimilation as the preferred model for immigrants in Italy.
- Self-defence: he argues that the assessment of lawful self-defence should take into account an individual's subjective perception of danger, rather than relying solely on an objective evaluation of the circumstances.
- Patriotism: the author calls for a renewed emphasis on Italian patriotic symbols and proposes stricter requirements for acquiring Italian citizenship, based on knowledge of the country's history and culture.
- Gender: the chapter on homosexuality and transgender issues is among the book's most controversial. Vannacci states that homosexual relationships should remain legal but argues that homosexuality should not be regarded as "normal". He also criticizes what he describes as "LGBT lobbies", which he claims promote these issues.

== Publication and reception ==
Between 10 and 27 August 2023, Il mondo al contrario sold approximately 93,700 copies. This was considered particularly notable because the book was self-published through Amazon's Kindle Direct Publishing platform, which offers authors substantially higher royalty rates than traditional publishing contracts. The book was one of the best-selling books in Italy in 2023, ranking fifth in the annual bestseller list compiled by the Italian Publishers Association (Associazione Italiana Editori). Later that year, the book was republished in a second edition by the Rimini-based publishing house Il Cerchio, with a foreword by journalist Francesco Borgonovo.

== Controversies ==
The publication of the book generated widespread controversy because of passages that critics described as offensive and discriminatory. Vannacci expressed controversial views regarding several social groups, including homosexuals, immigrants, feminists, and environmentalists. Among the statements that received the greatest public attention were "Dear homosexuals, you are not normal" and comments concerning Italian volleyball player Paola Egonu, in which he wrote that, although she is an Italian citizen, "it is evident that her physical features do not represent Italianness." Egonu subsequently filed a defamation lawsuit against Vannacci. However, the District Court of Lucca dismissed the charge, describing the general's remarks as inappropriate and improper but finding that they did not constitute a criminal offence.

Italian Minister of Defence Guido Crosetto described Vannacci's statements as "ravings" and initiated disciplinary proceedings against him. Following the controversy, Vannacci was removed from his position as commander of the Military Geographic Institute in Florence. The Ministry of Defence later suspended him for eleven months, citing a lack of responsibility, a breach of the armed forces' principles of neutrality and impartiality, and damage to the prestige and reputation of the Italian Army.
