= Aho report =

EU report on innovation

The Aho Group Report on Creating an Innovative Europe was published in 2006. The report was written by a four-member group chaired by Esko Aho, former Finnish Prime Minister. The committee was created at an informal summit of European Union leaders held at Hampton Court Palace in west London (UK) in October 2005. The report focuses on the creation of innovation-friendly markets, strengthening of resources for research and development, increasing structural mobility in Europe and fostering a culture which celebrates innovation.

== Members ==
- Mr. Esko Aho (chairman) – Former Prime Minister of Finland
- Dr. Jozef Cornu – former president and COO of Alcatel Telecom
- Prof. Luke Georghiou (Rapporteur) – Manchester Business School of the University of Manchester
- Prof. Antoni Subirà – IESE Business School (Barcelona)

== Context ==
The Hampton Court informal summit was held on 27 October 2025, during the UK's Presidency of the Council of the European Union. Planned as a two-day event, it in fact only lasted for one day.

== Summary ==
The report was published on 20 January 2006. It stated that current trends in the European Union were unsustainable in the face of global competition and calls for a European pact for research and innovation. The report calls for rapid collective action on a European scale and a new vision to address Europe's productivity and social challenges.

The creation of an internal market for innovative products and services, in a harmonised regulatory environment, would provide incentives to companies to increase their investments in research and development on a broader range of modern technologies. The strategic areas for the European economy are eHealth, pharmaceuticals, transport and logistics, energy, security, the environment and the digital content industry. The report puts forward improved financing of science and to increase investments and to provide fiscal incentives in high-tech domains such as biotechnology, nanotechnology and neurosciences. The report also makes a plea for the mobility of the European workforce, ideas and financial assets.

== See also ==
- Directorate-General for Enterprise and Industry (EU)
- Lisbon Strategy
- Sapir Report
