= Roberto Vannacci =

Italian military officer and politician (born 1968)

Roberto Vannacci MEP
- Official portrait, 2024

President of National Future
- Incumbent
- Assumed office 6 February 2026
- Preceded by: Office established

Member of the European Parliament
- Incumbent
- Assumed office 16 July 2024
- Constituency: North-West Italy

Personal details
- Born: 20 October 1968 (age 58) La Spezia, Italy
- Party: National Future (2026–present)
- Other political affiliations: Independent (2024–2025); Lega (2025–2026)
- Spouse: Camelia Mihailescu
- Children: 2
- Education: University of Turin; University of Trieste; University of Bucharest

Military service
- Allegiance: Italy
- Branch/service: Italian Army
- Years of service: 1986–2025
- Rank: Divisional General
- Commands: 9th Paratroopers Assault Regiment "Col Moschin"; Paratroopers Brigade "Folgore"; Task Force 45
- Battles/wars: Rwandan Civil War; Somali Civil War; Yugoslav Wars; War in Afghanistan; War in Iraq; First Libyan Civil War

Roberto Vannacci (born 20 October 1968) is an Italian far-right politician and retired army general. Since July 2024, he has been serving as a Member of the European Parliament; elected for the League, in February 2026 he founded his own political party, National Future.

Vannacci became a well-known and discussed figure following the publication in August 2023 of his book, Il mondo al contrario (The World Upside Down), which brought him to the center of considerable media attention due to the controversial statements expressed on feminism, immigrants, homosexuals, environmentalism and Jews.

== Biography ==
=== Early life ===
Vannacci was born in La Spezia, Liguria, in 1968, but raised in Ravenna, Emilia-Romagna. He is the son of an artillery captain from La Spezia, while his maternal grandfather was a Sardinian sailor from La Maddalena and his maternal grandmother was an Istrian woman from Pula of Hungarian descent. He obtained his scientific high school diploma at the Italian State School Leonardo da Vinci in Paris.

=== Military career ===
Vannacci attended the Military Academy of Modena and the Application School of Turin, holding three degrees in the military field: Strategic Sciences, from the University of Turin, International and Diplomatic Sciences, from the University of Trieste, and Military Sciences, from the University of Bucharest. He also obtained a second-level university master’s degree in Strategic Sciences from the University of Turin and another in International Strategic-Military Studies, organised in cooperation with the Catholic University of the Sacred Heart in Milan and LUISS University in Rome.

Vannacci passed the selection process to join the Italian Army's special forces unit, the 9th Paratroopers Assault Regiment "Col Moschin", where he completed the training course and obtained the qualification of special forces operator. Between 1992 and 1994, as commander of a special forces operational detachment, he took part in Operations Ibis I and II in Somalia and Operation Ippocampo in Rwanda and Yemen. Between 1996 and 2000, he served in Bosnia and Herzegovina during the IFOR and SFOR missions.

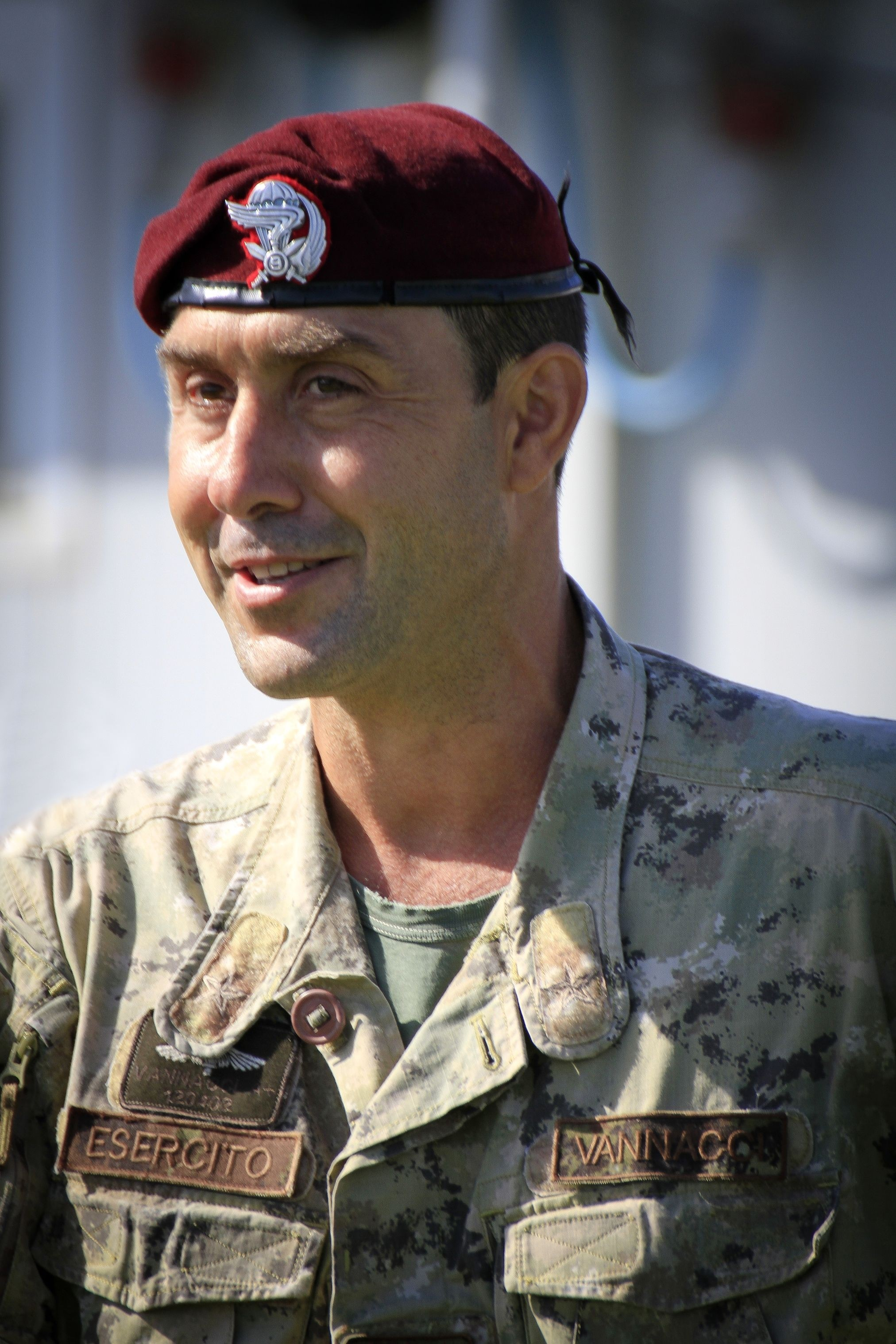
Vannacci as an Italian Army general in 2013

In 2004, Vannacci was assigned to the newly established Joint Special Forces Operations Command (COFS) in Rome, where he held several senior operational and staff positions, including Head of the Operations Office, Deputy Chief of Operations Staff, and Deputy Commander. After completing his assignment at COFS in 2009, he was deployed to Afghanistan as military assistant to the Chief of Staff of the International Security Assistance Force (ISAF), General Marco Bertolini, becoming the first Italian officer to hold this position. As a major and lieutenant colonel, he led special operations in Iraq and Afghanistan. He commanded the Special Forces Task Group in the Iraqi civil war and was the first commander of Task Force 45 during the War in Afghanistan, deployed in Herat and Farah.

In 2011, during the Arab Spring, Vannacci operated in Libya, providing support to Italian diplomatic authorities. In this role, he organised and carried out the emergency evacuation of the Italian diplomatic mission in Tripoli and of Italian citizens who remained in the vicinity of the capital. Returning to Afghanistan in 2013, shortly before the transition from ISAF to the Resolute Support Mission, he became Chief of Staff of the NATO Special Operations Forces Headquarters. From 2011 to 2013, he commanded the 9th Paratroopers Assault Regiment "Col Moschin". Subsequently, from 2014 to 2016, he served as Head of the International Relations Office within the III Department of the Defence Staff. In September 2016, after being promoted to Brigadier General, he assumed command of the Paratroopers Brigade "Folgore".

From September 2017 to August 2018, Vannacci served in Iraq as commander of the Italian Army contingent of Operation Prima Parthica and as Deputy Commanding General for Training of the anti-ISIS coalition within Operation Inherent Resolve. Vannacci was awarded the US Legion of Merit in 2018 for his efforts to combat the Islamic State.

From 2018 to 2020, Vannacci served as Chief of Staff of the Multinational Division South "Vittorio Veneto". In June 2020, as employer responsible for the Prima Parthica mission, HE reported the risks associated with exposure to depleted uranium particles and submitted complaints to the Military Prosecutor’s Office and the Rome Public Prosecutor’s Office, denouncing "serious and repeated omissions in the protection of the health and safety of Italian military personnel". From December 2020, Vannacci served as military attaché at the Embassy of Italy in Moscow, with accreditation also in Belarus, Armenia and Turkmenistan. In this role, he managed the period marked by the deterioration of relations between Italy and Russia following the Russian invasion of Ukraine. Promoted to Major General, on 21 June 2023 he assumed command of the Italian Military Geographic Institute in Florence.

=== Publication of "The world upside down" ===
On 10 August 2023, Vannacci self-published the book Il mondo al contrario (The World Upside Down") on Amazon. The book attracted widespread criticism due to content described as homophobic and sexist by several media outlets, while it received support from right-wing journalists like Vittorio Feltri and Maurizio Belpietro. The Minister of Defence Guido Crosetto distanced himself from Vannacci's views, describing them as "personal ravings that discredit the Army, the Defence and the Constitution". The Italian Army General Staff also dissociated itself from the views expressed by the officer in the book, stating that the publication had not been submitted for authorisation or review by military authorities and reserving the right to take measures to protect its reputation.

The controversy surrounding the publication of Vannacci's book received coverage in the press of several other European countries. The book was also criticised for the large number of grammatical and syntactical errors it contained. Il mondo al contrario rose to first place among the best sellers in Italy from 14 to 20 August. A few days after the book's publication, Vannacci received an offer from Roberto Fiore, leader of the far-right party New Force, to join the party and run in the 2023 by-election in the Monza single-member constituency, but he declined. Following the publication of the book, Vannacci was reported for defamation by volleyball player Paola Egonu after writing that the athlete's physical features "do not represent Italian identity". The complaint was later dismissed by the investigating judge of Lucca.

On 18 August 2023, Vannacci was replaced as commander of the Italian Military Geographical Institute by Major General Massimo Panizzi. On the same day, the Chief of Staff of the Italian Army, Pietro Serino, opened a preliminary investigation into Vannacci concerning the contents of his book. The proceedings concluded in February 2024 with Vannacci being suspended from service for 11 months and receiving half of his salary during the suspension period. According to the conclusions of the internal disciplinary proceedings, the publication of the book had resulted in "damage to the principle of neutrality and impartiality of the Armed Forces". In March 2024, Vannacci published Il coraggio vince (Courage Wins), an autobiographical book.

=== Political career ===
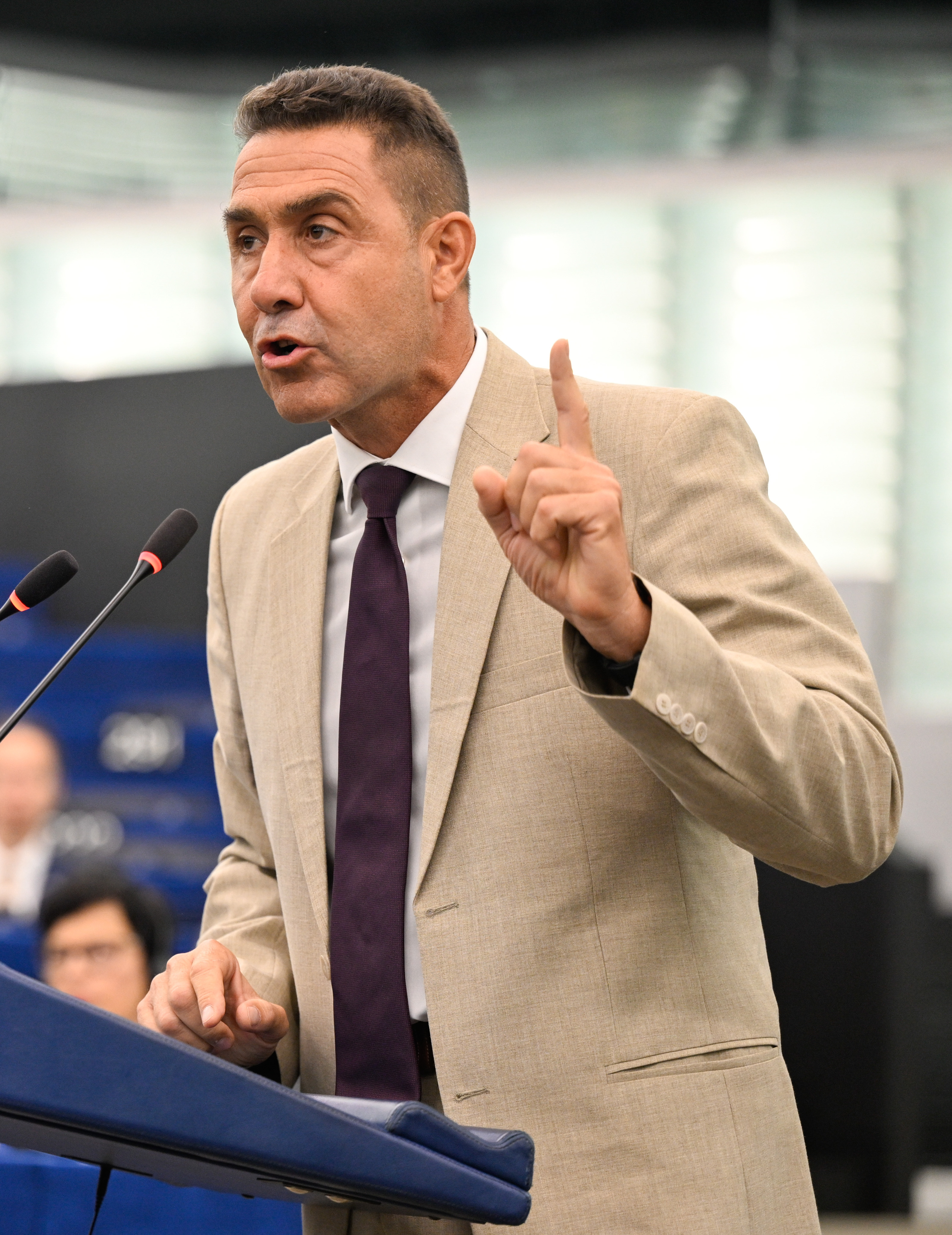
Vannacci speaking at the European Parliament in 2025

In April 2024, he accepted the candidacy to the European Parliament for the party Lega. He was elected to the European Parliament and was the second most voted candidate in Italy. On 16 July 2024, he was elected vice president of the EP group Patriots for Europe, but his nominee was opposed by the other parties and he was removed on the following day. On 15 May 2025, Vannacci was appointed deputy secretary of Lega, under the leadership of Matteo Salvini. In December 2025, Vannacci launched a political think tank that re-evaluated the role of the twenty years of Fascism and of Freemasonry, passing through the Italian Risorgimento and Italy's Pater Patriae.

Towards 2025, rumors began circulating that Vannacci was considering a break from the League to pursue an independent political project. In late 2025, he promoted a network of political committees and associations known as "The World Upside Down" (Il Mondo al Contrario), named after his 2023 book and developed as an organisational base for his political activism. Originally conceived as a cultural association to promote Vannacci's ideas, the network grew rapidly across Italy with dozens of local team committees established to articulate his political vision and mobilise supporters. These speculations intensified in January 2026, after he registered the trademark and symbol for a proposed political movement called National Future (Futuro Nazionale, FN) with the European intellectual property authorities, suggesting plans to create a distinct party.

On 3 February 2026, Vannacci formally left the League, ending his affiliation with the party after months of internal tensions over his political positions, and launched his new party's manifesto. On the same day, Vannacci was expelled from the Patriots for Europe group. On 6 February, FN was officially registered as a party and Vannacci became its president. On 13 and 14 June 2026, FN held its first party convention. In a speech to about 1,500 delegates, Vannacci said that the FN had received five percent support from potential voters in polls “even before FN was officially founded.” In Italy, the current electoral threshold for parliamentary elections is three percent of the vote. Although the Meloni government is seeking to amend the electoral law before the next election in the fall of 2027, there are (as of June 2026) no plans to change the electoral threshold requirement.

== Political positions ==
=== Abortion ===
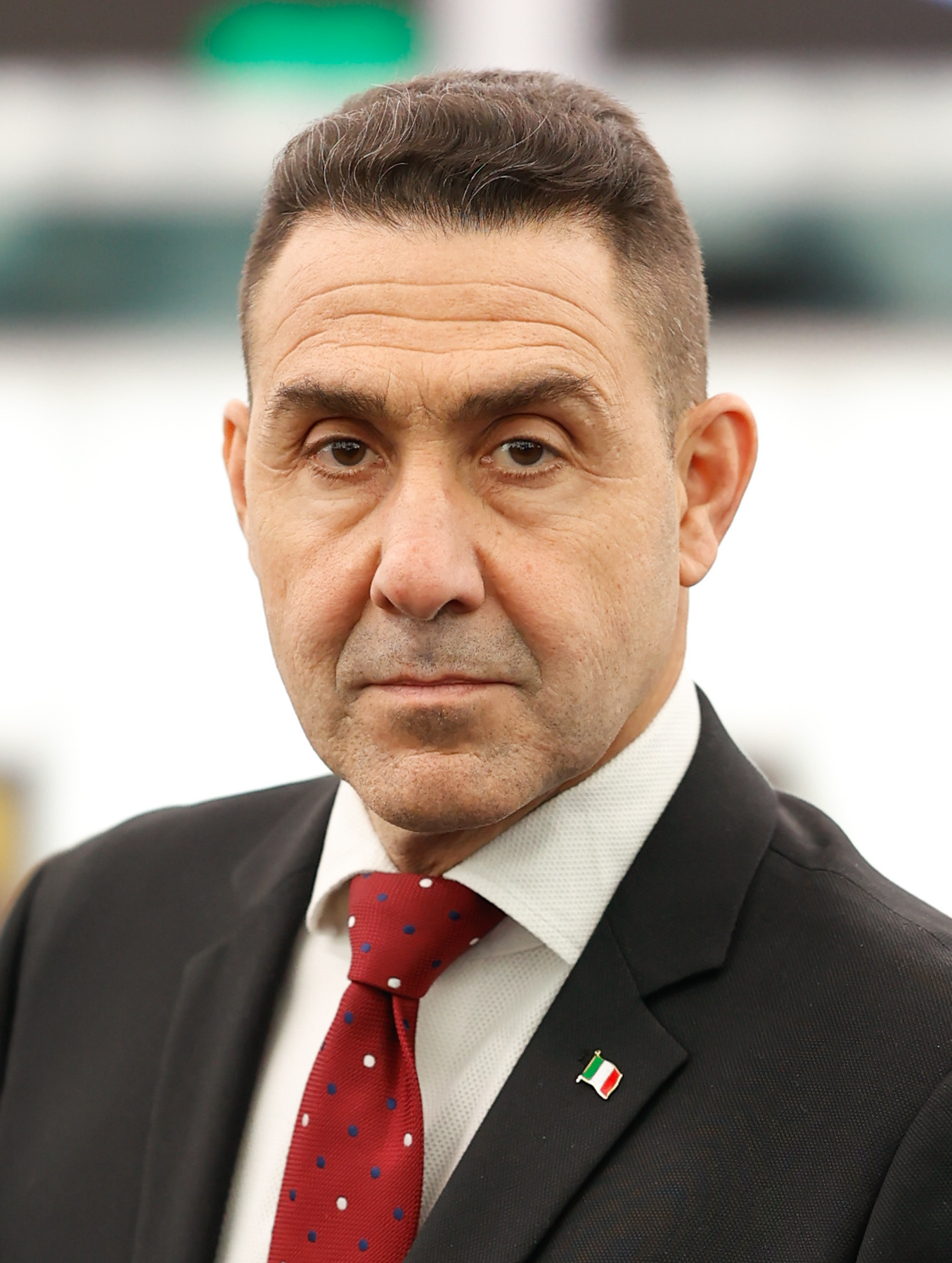
Vannacci in 2025

Vannacci has described himself as opposed to abortion, explaining that he does not consider it a right and that it's necessary to try to convince women not to have abortions. He has endorsed the value manifesto of the non-profit organization Pro Vita & Famiglia.

=== Disability ===
Vannacci expressed the desire to create separate classes for intellectually disabled students, arguing that this wouldn't be a discriminatory approach: "You can have them attend a lesson together, for a sense of belonging, but then they need specific support." The proposal was harshly criticized by politicians across the entire parliamentary spectrum, including members of the Lega, and by the Italian Episcopal Conference. Subsequently, the General reaffirmed his statements, declaring his conviction that helping disabled individuals in the most specific way may sometimes "not coincide with putting them together with other people with different characteristics" and that dedicated facilities would be necessary to ensure they receive particular attentions.

=== Fascism ===
According to some observers, Vannacci deliberately conducted a communication campaign based on being "politically incorrect", seeking the votes of fascist nostalgics in an indirect way by playing on a certain ambiguity. He refused to define himself as antifascist, arguing that "you cannot be against something that no longer exists", stated that Benito Mussolini "did good things", and referred to him several times as a "statesman", since he held government positions.

Other controversies arose during the 2024 European election campaign, when Vannacci released an electoral video spot in which he invited voters to mark una decima on the Lega symbol. Accused of wanting to celebrate the Xª Flottiglia MAS of the Italian Social Republic, Vannacci clarified that he was referring to the namesake special unit of the Royal Navy that operated until 1943. He made similar references on subsequent occasions.

In November 2025, Vannacci claimed that Mussolini came to power in a formally legal way, that the March on Rome "was not a coup d'état but little more than a street demonstration", and that until the mid-1930s fascism exercised power legally, not mentioning the fact that in its early years, Mussolini's political party was a paramilitary organization that killed Giacomo Matteotti, receiving criticism from the opposition, from unions such as the CGIL and even from members and allies of his own party.

In an AI-generated video published by Vannacci on his social media accounts in July 2026, he was depicted dressed as a Roman emperor and seated in an imperial setting. In the video, he received a fasces, and subsequently ordered the deaths of former Prime Ministers Giuseppe Conte and Romano Prodi, Democratic Party secretary Elly Schlein and former President of the Chamber of Deputies Laura Boldrini. The video generated controversy because of its use of fascist imagery and its depiction of the deaths of prominent political opponents.

=== Migrants ===
Vannacci has an anti-immigrant stance and advocates remigration, saying he would reduce the number of foreigners living in Italy from the current 12% to 4% of the population.

=== Russia ===
Vannacci has taken favorable positions towards Russia and Vladimir Putin, developed during his time as a military attaché in Moscow and expressed in the book Il mondo al contrario. He stated that he doesn't support the Russian invasion of Ukraine, but that he would prefer to be governed by Putin rather than Volodymyr Zelenskyy, citing the popular support that Putin supposedly enjoys. He has also claimed that he does not believe Putin is responsible for the death of Alexei Navalny, as there is no objective evidence.

== Personal life ==
He is married to Camelia Mihailescu, of Romanian origin, and they have two daughters.

== Electoral history ==
Election	House	Constituency	Party	Votes	Result
2024	European Parliament	North-West Italy	Lega	186,966	Elected

== Books ==
- Vannacci, Roberto (2023). Il mondo al contrario (in Italian). Self-published. ISBN 979-8-8546-9879-5.
  - Vannacci, Roberto (2023). Il mondo al contrario (in Italian). Preface by Francesco Borgonovo (2 ed.). Rimini: Il Cerchio. ISBN 978-88-8474-690-0.
- Vannacci, Roberto (2024). Il coraggio vince: vita e valori di un generale incursore (in Italian). Milan: Piemme. ISBN 978-88-566-9496-3.
