= Sapir Report =

2003 report on the economy of the European Union

An Agenda for a Growing Europe, also called The Sapir Report, is a report on the economy of the European Union edited by a panel of experts under the direction of the Belgian economist André Sapir and published in July 2003. The report follows an initiative by Romano Prodi, President of the European Commission, notably to analyze the Lisbon Strategy.

Sapir, who coordinated the redaction of the report, is now a Senior Fellow at the Bruegel think tank and a professor of economics at the Université Libre de Bruxelles.

In relation to the European Union Budget, the report noted that "as it stands today, the EU budget is a historical relic. Expenditures, revenues and procedures are all inconsistent with the present and future state of EU integration".

== See also ==
- Aho report
