= Davide Bergamini =

Italian politician (born 1973)

Member of the Chamber of Deputies
- Incumbent
- Assumed office 13 October 2022
- Constituency: Emilia-Romagna – P03

Personal details
- Born: 7 February 1973 (age 53)
- Party: Lega (until 2026); Forza Italia (2026); National Future (2026-present)

Davide Bergamini (born 7 February 1973) is an Italian politician serving as a member of the Chamber of Deputies since 2022. He has served as mayor of Vigarano Mainarda since 2021. In 2026, he left Lega and joined Forza Italia, and later National Future.
