= Lúcio Mauro Vinhas de Souza =

American-Portuguese economist

Lúcio Vinhas de Souza
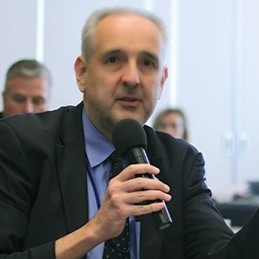
- Lúcio Vinhas de Souza at the Peterson Institute for International Economics in Washington, D.C.
- Born: Salvador, Bahia
- Education: Universidade Nova de Lisboa
- Occupations: Chief Economist and Director of the Economics Department, BUSINESSEUROPE. Previously, Visiting Professor, Brandeis University; Fellow, Harvard University; Former Advisor, European External Action Service (EEAS) and Board Member of the National Economists Club
- Website: www.vinhasdesouza.org

Lúcio Vinhas de Souza is an American-Portuguese economist. His main research areas are global macroeconomics, development economics, monetary economics, finance and country risk, with extensive work experience at the developed economies of the European Union and the US, and in several emerging market regions, from the former Soviet Union to East Asia, Africa and Latin America.

Born in Salvador, Bahia, Brazil, he has B.A. and M.Sc. degrees in economics by the Faculdade de Economia da Universidade Nova de Lisboa (FE/UNL) in Lisbon, Portugal, and a Ph.D. in economics by the Erasmus University in Rotterdam, the Netherlands. He became a United States citizen in 2026, the year the U.S. commemorated its 250th birthday, the United States Semiquincentennial.

Dr. Vinhas de Souza is currently the Chief Economist and Director of the Economics Department of BUSINESSEUROPE and he was a Board Member of the National Economists Club in Washington, D.C.. Previously he was Visiting Professor at Brandeis University and a Fellow at Harvard University. Between 2021 and 2023 he was an Advisor to the leadership of the European External Action Service or EEAS, the EU's joint Ministry of Foreign Affairs and Defense (U.S. analog would be the Department of State and the Department of Defense), where he dealt with international economic and financial matters, EU sanctions and the EU's international energy policy . Before that, he led the Economics Department of the European Political Strategy Centre (EPSC), an internal advisory body to the European Commission President (the U.S. analog would be the Council of Economic Advisers). In this position, he coordinated analysis and supported the definition and implementation of all matter of economic and financial policies for the EC President and his Cabinet, including among others, "EU-Asia Connectivity" , the predecessor of the "Global Gateway" EU policy, the EU's Banking Union and Capital Markets Union, the EU Budget -known as the Multiannual Financial Framework (MFF), and the so-called ‘5 Presidents’ report on the reform of the euro area. Prior to that, Dr. Vinhas de Souza was between 2011 and 2015 the first Sovereign Chief Economist of Moody's Investors Service (MIS), the second largest rating agency in the world. There, he helped define the analytical response of MIS to the global sovereign debt crisis, and interacted with public and private counterparts in the 140-plus Moody’s rated sovereigns and multilateral bodies around the world.

Before joining Moody’s, Dr. Vinhas de Souza was a World Bank official based in its Washington, D.C. headquarters, where he worked in several subjects, from the euro area to China and Kazakhstan. Prior to that, he was between 2005 and 2010 the Head for Russia and Belarus and coordinator for the Western countries of the Commonwealth of Independent States at the Directorate-General for Economic and Financial Affairs (DG-ECFIN) of the European Commission (EC). Previously, between 2002 and 2005, he was Coordinator of Research Area at the Kiel Institute for the World Economy (IfW) in Kiel, Germany. Dr. Vinhas de Souza also held the position of Economist at the United Nations Secretariat between 1995 and 1997. He was also a Fellow at the ECARES-Free University of Brussels, a Visiting Researcher at the Central Banks of Estonia and Germany, and a member of the Managing Board of the University Association for Contemporary European Studies (UACES) between 2003 and 2006.

Dr. Vinhas de Souza is also currently a member of the advisory board of the John F. Welch College of Business at the Sacred Heart University in the United States and a fellow at several research centers. He also has over a hundred different publications in several languages.

Dr. Vinhas de Souza is married and has one daughter, both of which are U.S. citizens.

== Publications ==
2024 “A Century of Global Economic Crises”, Palgrave Macmillan, Summer 2024.

2024 “Global Trends to 2040” , ESPAS, spring 2024.

2024 “Crescimento e Convergência em Portugal: Experiência Histórica e Políticas a Nível Nacional e Metropolitano” , Position Paper n. 5/24, SEDES, Lisbon, Portugal.

2024 “Ensaio: Crescimento e Convergência em Portugal: Experiência Histórica e Políticas a Nível Nacional e Metropolitano” , O Observador, Lisbon, Portugal.

2024 “Unhappy anniversary: Missed opportunities for growth and convergence in Portugal” , VoxEU, CEPR, London, 11 March 2024.

2024 “A Noite dos Mortos-Vivos: o retorno de políticas industriais” , in Conjuntura Econômica, 78(3):22-27, FGV/IBRE.

2024 “Unresolved Business: Enlarging the EU towards Moldova and Ukraine (and perhaps Georgia)” , VoxEU, CEPR, London, 5 Feb 2024.

2023 “O que pode a UE oferecer ao Brasil?” , CEBRI-Revista, Spring 2023.

2021 “Energy Transition, Resources and Climate Change Investment Policy in the EU”, in Handbook on the Sustainable Politics and Economics of Natural Resources , Edward Elgar.

2020 “Models of banking sectors integration: The Experience of the Baltics and Central Eastern Europe”, in Does EU membership facilitate convergence? The experience of the EU's eastern enlargement , Palgrave Macmillan.

2018 “Reviving convergence: making EU member states fit for joining the euro area”, in Structural Reforms for Growth and Cohesion: Lessons and Challenges for CESEE Countries and a Modern Europe , Edward Elgar.

2016 "Towards a Positive Euro Area Fiscal Stance", European Commission.

2016 "Engaging China at a Time of Transition: Capitalising on a New Era of Chinese Global Investment and Foreign Policy Initiatives" , European Commission.

2016 "The European Fund for Strategic Investments (EFSI): Maximising its Potential" , European Commission.

2015 "Regaining Citizens’ Trust, Safeguarding Banks’ Stability: Towards a European Deposit Insurance Scheme" , European Commission.

2015 "Strengthening the EU’s Financial System: Bridge Financing Options for the Single Resolution Fund" , European Commission.

2015 "Severing the ‘Doom Loop’: Further Risk Reduction in the Banking Union" , European Commission.

2015 “The Asian Infrastructure Investment Bank: A New Multilateral Financial Institution or a Vehicle for China’s Geostrategic Goals?” , European Commission.

2014 “Global Oil Price Volatility: Oil Exporting Sovereigns with Limited Policy Tools Are Most Exposed”, Moody’s.

2014 “Monetary Policy Tightening in the US and its Consequences”, Moody’s.

2014 “Population Ageing Will Dampen Economic Growth over the Next Two Decades”, Moody’s.

2014“Financial Markets (Re) Segmentation in the Euro Area”, author and guest editor, Comparative Economic Studies, Volume 56, Issue 3, September 2014, Palgrave.

2014 “Brazil & Mexico: Gaps in Infrastructure Investment Uneven across Sectors”, Moody’s.

2014 “Commodity-Exporting Sovereigns: Fiscal Practices and Exchange Rate Regime Determine Resilience to Price Shocks”, Moody’s.

2014 “CIS Economies: Growth Slowdown Driven by Structural rather Than Cyclical Factors”, Moody’s.

2014 “Russia & the EU: EU Economies Would Be Resilient to a Russian Recession”, Moody’s.

2014 “Structural and Cyclical Components in Emerging Markets’ Growth Slowdown”, Moody’s.

2014 “The GCC in 2020: Oil price scenario of $90pb would be negative for some GCC economies, neutral for others”, Moody’s.

2014 “QE Tapering: Impact Differs Amongst Emerging Markets”, Moody’s.

2013 “US Monetary Policy and the Road to Normalization”, Moody’s.

2013 “Sub-Saharan Africa: Steeply Rising House Prices Have Limited Sovereign Credit Impact”, Moody’s.

2013 “US Fed Tapering: Effects Likely to be Relatively Limited and Temporary”, Moody’s.

2013 “Limited GDP benefits of Basel III expected for developing economies”, Moody’s.

2013 “Private leverage trends in developed and developing economies”, Moody’s.

2013 “Update on Structural Reforms in the Euro Area Periphery”, Moody’s.

2013“Sub-Saharan Africa: Commodity Price Vulnerability Balanced by Favorable Economic Outlook and Gradual Structural Transformation”, Moody’s.

2012 “Euro Area Periphery: Structural Reforms Have Significantly Improved External Imbalances, But Full Resolution May Still Take Years”, Moody’s, New York, USA.

2012 “Counter-cyclical Central Banking Policies and their Longer-Term Implications”, Moody’s, New York, USA.

2012 “Sub-Saharan Africa: Despite Risks, Banking Sector Exposures to Euro Area are Mitigated by Structural Factors”, Moody’s, New York, USA.

2012 “China 2030: Building a Modern, Harmonious, and Creative High-Income Society”, World Bank, Washington, D.C., and Development Research Center of the State Council, People’s Republic of China, Beijing.

2011 “Optimum Currency Area Criteria”, in “The Regional Integration Handbook”, de Lombaerde, P., Flores, R., Iapadre, L. and Shulz, M. (eds), Routledge, pp. 179–197, United Kingdom.

2011 “Global Economic Prospects Summer 2011 Issue”, World Bank, Washington, D.C.

2011 “An Initial Estimation of the Economic Effects of the Creation of the EurAsEC Customs Union on Its Members”, Economic Premise n° 47, January 2010, World Bank, Washington, D.C.

2011 “Global Economic Prospects 2011”, World Bank, Washington, D.C.

2009 “The EU’s Eastern Neighbours and the Crisis”, in European Economy Research Letter, 3(2), European Commission, Brussels.

2009 “The Impact of the Global Crisis on Neighbouring Countries of the EU”, in ECFIN Occasional Papers n° 40, European Commission, Brussels.

2009 "Trade Relations between an Enlarged EU and the Russian Federation, and its Effects in Belarus", in Economic Change and Restructuring, 42(1), pp. 1–24.

2008 "Economic Aspects of the Energy Sector in CIS Countries" (editor), ECFIN Economic Papers n° 327, European Commission, Brussels.

2008 "Russia: A Different Country", CEPS Paperback Books Series, CEPS, Brussels, May 2008.

2008 "Foreign Investment in Russia", in Country Focus, Volume V, Issue 1, European Commission, Brussels.

2007 "The Effect of Capital Requirement Regulation on the Transmission of Monetary Policy: evidence from Austria", in Empirica, 34(5), pp. 411–425.

2007 "The Effects of Energy Price Shocks on Growth and Macroeconomic Stability in Selected Energy-Importing CIS Countries", in Economic Review of EU Neighbour Countries, Occasional Paper n° 30, June 2007, European Commission, Brussels, pp 2–22.

2006 "From Transition Crises to Macroeconomic Stability? Lessons from a Crises Early Warning System for Eastern European and CIS Countries", in Comparative Economic Studies, 2006(48), pp;410–434.

2006 "A Wider Europe: Trade Relations between an Enlarged EU and the Russian Federation", in Problems of Economic Transition, 49(2), pp;6–33.

2006 Return to Growth in CIS Countries, Vinhas de Souza, L. and Havrylyshy, O. (eds.), Springer Verlag, Germany.

2006 "Financial Liberalization and Business Cycles: The Experience of the New EU Member States in The Baltics and Central Eastern Europe", in Batten, J. and Kearney, C. (eds.) Emerging European Financial Markets, International Finance Review 2006(6), pp. 235–259, Elsevier, Netherlands.

2006 "Beyond the euro area: An introduction", in Research in International Business and Finance, 20(2), pp;127–130 (also guest editor of this RIBAF issue).

2006 "The Periphery of the Euro: Monetary and Exchange Rate Policy in CIS Countries",Vinhas de Souza, L. and De Lombaerde, P. (eds), Ashgate Publishing, United Kingdom.

2005 "Macro and Monetary Policies in Latin America", co-editor, Springer Verlag, Germany.

2004 "Transition and Growth in Belarus", in Ofer, G. and Pomfret, R. (eds.), The Economic Prospects of the CIS, Edward Elgar, United Kingdom, pp;57–75.

2003 The Euroarea and the New EU Member States (editor, with van Aarle, B.), Palgrave Macmillan Press, United Kingdom.

2003 "A Primer on Budgetary Questions on the New EU Members States", in The Journal of European Affairs, 1(1), 2003, pp. 15–18.

2002 "Trade and Monetary Integration in Large, Mature Economies: A Primer on the European Monetary Union", IfW Working Papers Series, n° 1137, Germany.

2002 "The Political Business Cycles of EU Accession Countries", in European Union Politics, 3(2), 2002, pp. 231–250.

2002 "Monetary Institutions and the Politics of the Macro-economy in EU Accession Countries", in Linden, R. (ed.), Norms and Nannies: The Impact of International Organisations on Central and East European States, Rowman and Littlefield, pp. 341–368, USA.

2001 "Exchange Rate Strategies of New EU Entrants", in Pentecost, E. and Poeck, A. (eds.), European Monetary Integration: Past, Present and Future, Edward Elgar, UK, pp 185–203.

2001 "Exchange Rates Links and Strategies of New EU Entrants", in The Journal of European Integration, 23(1), 2001, pp. 1–28.

1999 "EMU and Enlargement: A Review of Policy Issues", Economic Affairs Series, Working Paper ECON 117 EN, Directorate General for Research, European Parliament, Luxembourg.
