= Knowledge triangle =

The knowledge triangle refers to the interaction between research, education and innovation, which are key drivers of a knowledge-based society. In the European Union, it also refers to an attempt to better link together these key concepts, with research and innovation already highlighted by the development of the Lisbon Strategy.The concept lay behind the European Commission's 2006 proposal to create a European Institute of Technology (EIT), now the European Institute of Innovation and Technology.
