= Gianangelo Bof =

Italian politician (born 1975)

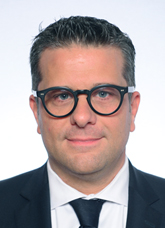
- Bof in 2022

Member of the Chamber of Deputies
- Incumbent
- Assumed office 13 October 2022
- Constituency: Veneto 1 – P01

Personal details
- Born: 7 January 1975 (age 51)
- Party: Lega (until 2026); National Future (2026-present)

Gianangelo Bof (born 7 January 1975) is an Italian politician serving as a member of the Chamber of Deputies since 2022. He has served as mayor of Tarzo since 2022, having previously served from 2007 to 2017. In 2026, he left Lega and joined National Future.
