= Directorate-General for Internal Market, Industry, Entrepreneurship and SMEs =

European Commission department

The Directorate-General for Internal Market, Industry, Entrepreneurship and SMEs (DG GROW) is a Directorate-General of the European Commission. The Enterprise Directorate-General works on creating an environment in which European firms can thrive. The improvement of the business environment is to lead to a growth in productivity and subsequently create the jobs and wealth necessary to achieve the objectives set by the European Council in Lisbon in March 2000.

Under the Foreign Subsidies Regulation, it is responsible for checking public procurement bids for foreign subsidies that distort competition, and can initiate investigations into other distortive effects of foreign subsidies.

In 2022 the Commissioner was Thierry Breton and the Director-General was Kerstin Jorna. As of 2020, it had 714 employees.

== See also ==
- European Commissioner for Internal Market
- Aho report
- Sectoral e-Business Watch
