= FDI screening =

States use foreign direct investment (FDI) screening (investment screening for short) to prevent foreign investors from buying national assets at bargain prices or reducing competition, and to protect national security and critical infrastructure. As of 2023, FDI screening mechanisms are employed by around 50 countries among those participating in OECD discussions on freedom of investment. FDI screening methods include procedures to assess, investigate, authorise, condition, prohibit or unwind FDIs.

== Per state ==
=== European Union ===
The European Union's foreign direct investment screening framework is defined in its FDI screening Regulation.

The Regulation applies in all member states directly. It does not currently harmonise the FDI screening procedures of the EU member states; they may conduct FDI screening as they wish. However, they must make their screening policy transparent by notifying the European Commission and the other member states. This is to ensure that the FDI screenings operate fast, yet do not discriminate between different non-EU countries and do not disclose confidential and commercially sensitive information.

The introduction of national FDI Screening regimes is a global trend, with many EU Member States now having FDI Screening regimes in place. As of September 2024, 24 out of 27 EU member states had FDI screening mechanisms in place. The most recent state to have introduced an FDI screening regime is Ireland, which adopted the Screening of Third Country Transactions Act 2023 (the FDI Act), which became effective in late 2024.

=== United States ===
In 2018, the United States adopted the Foreign Investment Risk Review Modernization Act, which expanded the oversight capacity of the Committee on Foreign Investment in the United States (CFIUS) for foreign investments.
