= Lisbon Strategy =

Former action and development plan of the EU

The Lisbon Strategy, also known as the Lisbon Agenda or Lisbon Process, was an action and development plan devised in 2000, for the economy of the European Union between 2000 and 2010. A pivotal role in its formulation was played by the Portuguese economist Maria João Rodrigues.

Its aim was to make the EU "the most competitive and dynamic knowledge-based economy in the world capable of sustainable economic growth with more and better jobs and greater social cohesion", by 2010. It was set out by the European Council in Lisbon in March 2000. By 2010, most of its goals were not achieved. It was succeeded by the Europe 2020 strategy.

== Background and objectives ==
The Lisbon Strategy intended to deal with the low productivity and stagnation of economic growth in the EU, through the formulation of various policy initiatives to be taken by all EU member states. The broader objectives set out by the Lisbon strategy were to be attained by 2010.

It was adopted for a ten-year period in 2000 in Lisbon, Portugal by the European Council. It broadly aimed to "make Europe, by 2010, the most competitive and the most dynamic knowledge-based economy in the world".

=== Strategy ===
The main fields were economic, social, and environmental renewal and sustainability. The Lisbon Strategy was heavily based on the economic concepts of:

- Innovation as the motor for economic change (based on the writings of Joseph Schumpeter)
- The "learning economy"
- Social and environmental renewal

Under the strategy, a stronger economy would create employment in the EU, alongside inclusive social and environmental policies, which would themselves drive economic growth even further.

An EU research group found in 2005 that current progress had been judged "unconvincing", so a reform process was introduced wherein all goals would be reviewed every three years, with assistance provided on failing items.

Translation of the Lisbon Strategy goals into concrete measures led to the extension of the Framework Programmes for Research and Technological Development (FPs) into FP7 and the Joint Technology Initiatives (JTI).

=== Key thinkers and concepts ===
Contemporary key thinkers on whose works the Lisbon Strategy was based and/or who were involved in its creation include Maria João Rodrigues, Christopher Freeman, Bengt-Åke Lundvall, Luc Soete, Daniele Archibugi Carlota Perez, Manuel Castells, Giovanni Dosi, and Richard Nelson.

Key concepts of the Lisbon Strategy include those of the knowledge economy, innovation, techno-economic paradigms, technology governance, and the "open method of coordination" (OMC).

== Midterm review ==
Between April and November 2004, the Dutch politician Wim Kok headed up a review of the program and presented a report on the Lisbon strategy concluding that even if some progress was made, most of the goals were not achieved:

European Union and its Member States have clearly themselves contributed to slow progress by failing to act on much of the Lisbon strategy with sufficient urgency. This disappointing delivery is due to an overloaded agenda, poor coordination and conflicting priorities. Still, a key issue has been the lack of determined political action.

The European Commission used this report as a basis for its proposal in February 2005 to refocus the Lisbon Agenda on actions that promote growth and jobs in a manner that is fully consistent with the objective of sustainable development. The important contribution made by small and medium-sized enterprises to economic growth and innovation was stressed. The Commission's communication stated that

Making growth and jobs the immediate target goes hand in hand with promoting social or environmental objectives.

In its resolution on the midterm review of the Lisbon strategy in March 2005, the European Parliament expressed its belief that "sustainable growth and employment are Europe's most pressing goals and underpin social and environmental progress" and "that well-designed social and environmental policies are themselves key elements in strengthening Europe's economic performance".

These declarations were classed as unrealistic by some, and the failure of the "relaunch" initiative was predicted if the existing approach was not changed.

== Closing review ==
In 2009, Swedish prime minister Fredrik Reinfeldt admitted:

Even if progress has been made it must be said that the Lisbon Agenda, with only a year remaining before it is to be evaluated, has been a failure.

—

The alleged failure of the Lisbon Strategy was widely commented on in the news and by member states leaders.

Spain's prime minister José Luis Rodríguez Zapatero pointed out that the non-binding character of the Lisbon Strategy contributed to the failure, and this lesson needed to be taken into account by the new Europe 2020 strategy.

Official appraisal of the Lisbon Strategy took place in March 2010 at a European Summit, where the new Europe 2020 strategy was also launched.

== See also ==
- Aho report
- Community patent
- European Institute of Technology (EIT)
- Innovative Medicines Initiative
- Knowledge triangle
- Sapir Report
- Lisbon Council
- Science and technology in Europe

=== Lobbiers ===
- Euroscience
- Transatlantic Business Dialogue, which took part in the report for a new restart of the agenda
- Union of Industrial and Employers' Confederations of Europe (UNICE)
- European Trade Union Confederation (ETUC)
