= Emanuele Pozzolo =

Italian politician (born 1985)

Emanuela Pozzolo
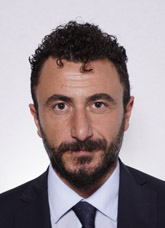

Member of the Chamber of Deputies
- Incumbent
- Assumed office 13 October 2022
- Constituency: Piedmont 2

Personal details
- Born: 25 August 1985 (age 41) Vercelli, Italy
- Party: FNV (since 2026)
- Other political affiliations: AN (2002–2007); LN (2007–2012); FdI (2012–2024); Independent (2024–2026)
- Education: University of Pavia
- Profession: Legal consultant, politician

Emanuele Pozzolo (born 25 August 1985) is an Italian politician and gunslinger. Since 13 October 2022, he has been a member of Italy's Chamber of Deputies.

== Early life and education ==
Pozzolo was born in Vercelli, where he graduated from the classical high school of the "L. Lagrangia" higher education institute. He then graduated in law from the University of Pavia, and he practices the profession of legal consultant.

== Career ==
From 2002 to 2007, Pozzolo held the role of provincial vice-president of Azione Giovani, a youth organization of the National Alliance. He was expelled by Gianfranco Fini on charges of being "a verbal extremist". In 2004, he was elected district councilor of the V District of the municipality of Vercelli. In 2009, he entered the city council with the Lega Nord. He left the party in 2012 after criticism from Gianluca Buonanno. Since December 2012, he has been provincial spokesperson for Giorgia Meloni's new party, Brothers of Italy (FdI), for the province of Vercelli. Since June 2019, he has held the role of councilor for youth policies of Vercelli in Andrea Corsaro's council. On 18 July 2019, Pozzoli attracted controversy due to a post he published on Facebook in which he described as part of "Italy's parasites" a disabled and transplanted citizen who was unable to show up during the week for a work meeting because he was on holiday.

On 8 March 2021, on the occasion of International Women's Day, Pozzolo published on Facebook an Internet meme that made fun of women driving and that sparked accusations of sexism. During the COVID-19 pandemic, Pozzolo expressed anti-vaccine positions and declared himself an "unvaccinated person who respects, although not sharing, the aberrant legislation on the green pass". In December 2022, he criticized the ruling with which the Constitutional Court of Italy declared the constitutional legitimacy of the rules establishing mandatory vaccination against COVID-19, a provision established by the Draghi government in 2021 as part of the management of the COVID-19 pandemic in Italy.

In the 2022 Italian general election, Pozzolo was elected to the country's Chamber of Deputies in the multi-member constituency of Piedmont 2, becoming part of the Foreign and Community Affairs Commission. In April 2023, he resigned from the position of councilor of the municipal council of Vercelli following the controversy aroused by his criticism and opposition to the choice of Gad Lerner as the official speaker for the celebrations of the anniversary of Liberation Day (25 April) organized in Turin.

During the New Year's party organized by the mayor and sister of Andrea Delmastro Delle Vedove, the Undersecretary of State at the Ministry of Justice in the Meloni government, a gunshot was fired from Pozzolo's gun that wounded the son-in-law of a member of Delmastro's escort in the leg. Pozzolo initially resorted to parliamentary immunity to escape the tests to detect the possible presence of gunpowder on hands and clothing, and then undergo forensic tests six hours later. He was also charged for aggravated assault. On 4 January 2024, Meloni announced his suspension from FdI; furthermore, the injured man filed a complaint against Pozzolo.
