= Kerstin Jorna =

German lawyer and civil servant

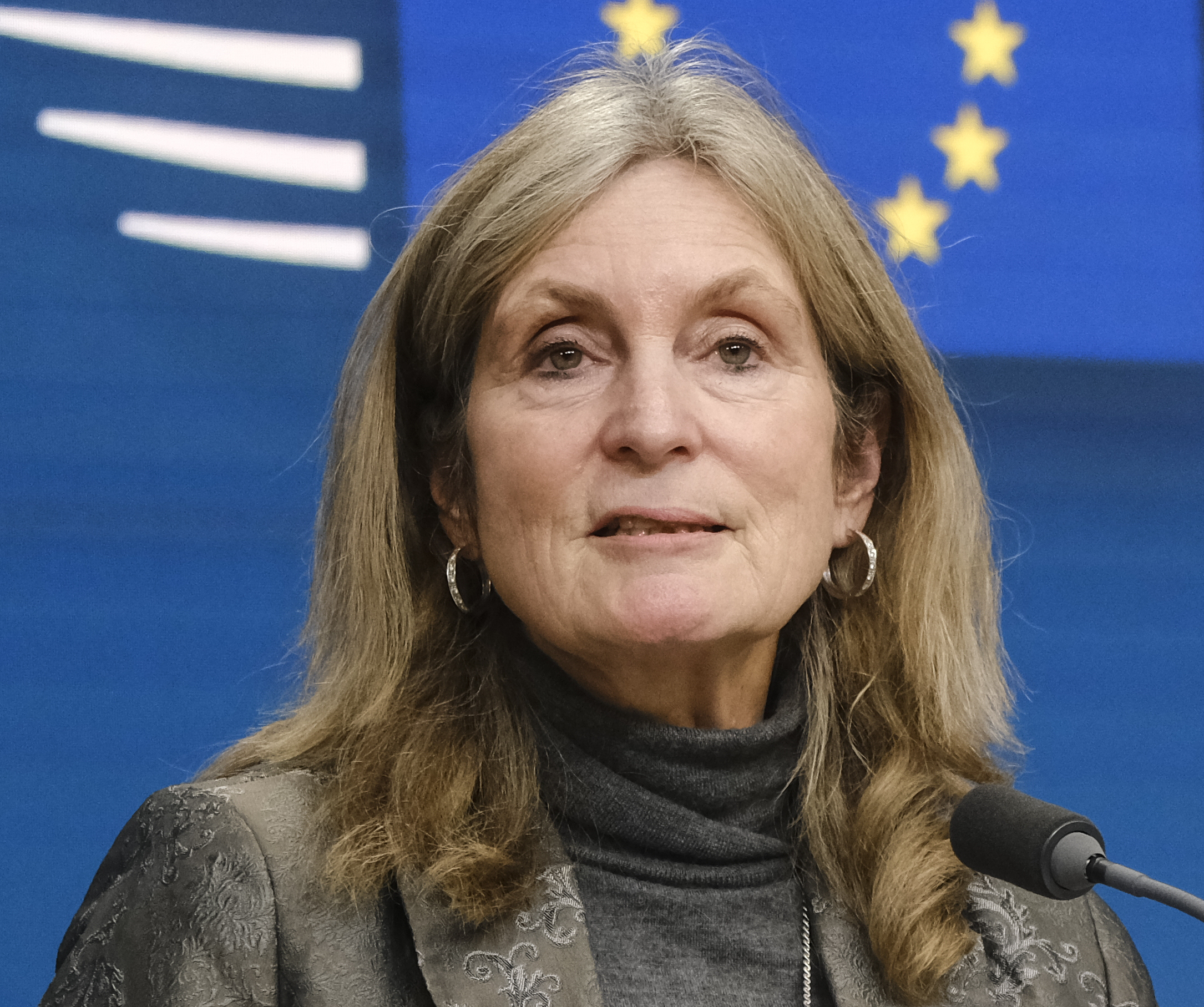
- Education: Bonn and Hamburg universities
- Employer: European Commission
- Known for: Director-General for Internal Market, Industry, Entrepreneurship and SMEs

Kerstin Jorna is the European Commission's Director-General for Internal Market, Industry, Entrepreneurship and SMEs. She is a German lawyer, fluent in four languages who has been a civil servant for the European Union since 1990.

== Life ==
Jorna is German. From 1980 to 1985 she was studying law in Bonn and Hamburg universities. She took a second state examination in Hamburg and a diploma in Advanced European Studies in Bruges. She is fluent in German, English, French and Dutch and she has a good knowledge of Spanish.

In 1986 she was working for a Hamburg law firm until she began working for the European Commission as a policy officer. Between 2000 and 2001 she was the Commission's press officer for regional policy and institutional affairs.

At the end of 2016 she was a deputy DG at the directorate responsible for Economic and Financial Affairs.

In 2017 she became a non executive member of the European Investment Bank.

She was the Director General when Thierry Breton was the commissioner and Hubert Gambs was her deputy. The DG looks after the single market and its growth, but it is also responsible for decarbonisation and digitisation. She encourages new technologies like hydrogen as a carbon free fuel, which has become additionally important as the Russian invasion of Ukraine in 2022 changed the European Commission's priorities to find alternatives to imported raw materials like Russian gas. Jorna explained that the European Commission had modelled the future requirements for raw materials but it had not anticipated that imports from Russia or China might become unavailable.
