= EU FDI screening framework =

FDI screening Regulation
- Long title: Regulation (EU) 2019/452 of the European Parliament and of the Council of 19 March 2019 establishing a framework for the screening of foreign direct investments into the Union
- Territorial extent: European Union
- Status: In force

The European Union's foreign direct investment screening framework is defined in its FDI screening Regulation.

The Regulation applies in all member states directly. It does not currently harmonise the FDI screening procedures of the EU member states; they may conduct FDI screening as they wish. However, they must make their screening policy transparent by notifying the European Commission and the other member states. This is to ensure that the FDI screenings operate fast, yet do not discriminate between different non-EU countries and do not disclose confidential and commercially sensitive information.

In 2024, the European Commission made plans to oblige its member states to follow a minimum set of FDI screening standards, using minimum harmonisation.

== Current regulation ==
The regulation puts in place a mechanism for member states to exchange information making it easier to screen a foreign investment on grounds of security. When an EU member state conducts an FDI screening, it must notify the Commission and other member states as soon as possible. The other states and the European Commission can then submit comments if they consider the screening to affect security or public order in their country or in the other member states. FDI screening is defined as a procedure to "assess, investigate, authorise, condition, prohibit or unwind FDIs".

One FDI that was likely screened and notified was the acquisition of Swedish Volvo Cars by the Chinese car manufacturer Geely. In terms of overall screening volumes, for example, Germany screened (and notified the Commission of) 570 foreign direct investments in 2022.
