= China 2030 =

2012 study published by the World Bank

China 2030: Building a Modern, Harmonious, and Creative High-Income Society is an extensive study of the Economy of China published in 2012 by the World Bank, Washington, D.C., and the Development Research Center of the State Council, People's Republic of China, Beijing. China 2030 attempts to set forth a possible development path for China that would result in attainment of the status of a "rich country" by 2030. An earlier report "China 2020" was prepared under World Bank auspices in 1998.

China 2030 called for China to embrace liberal economic policies, including re-defining the role of its state-owned enterprises and breaking up monopolies in certain industries. Among other points, the report argued that relative to the private sector, "SOEs consume a large proportion of capital, raw materials, and intermediate inputs to produce relatively small shares of gross output and value added."

== Protest at press conference for release of report ==
A press conference to mark the release of the report was held on February 27, 2012. As World Bank President Robert Zoellick began his remarks, self-described scholar of politics and economics Du Jianguo began protesting. Du shouted slogans including: "State-owned industry should not be privatized!" and "This report from the World Bank is poison!" Before being pulled from the room, Du passed out an essay he had written titled, "WB Go Home With Your Poison!" In response, Zoellick acknowledged the intense debate in China between nationalists and economic liberalizers, and said this was "the point of any good research report." Du's protest received widespread praise from China's influential netizens and he became a featured guest on news shows for some time.
