= Opinion polling for the 2018 Italian general election =

In the years running up to the 2018 Italian general election, held on 4 March, various organisations carried out opinion polls to gauge voting intention in Italy. Results of such polls are given in this article. The date range is from the 2013 Italian general election, held on 24–25 February, to two weeks before the new election, 16 February 2018. Poll results are reported at the dates when the fieldwork was done, as opposed to the date of publication; if such date is unknown, the date of publication is given instead. Under the Italian par condicio (equal conditions) law, publication of opinion polls is forbidden in the last two weeks of an electoral campaign.

== Party vote ==
The data on Forza Italia (FI) prior to 16 November 2013 refer to its predecessor, The People of Freedom (PdL), which at its dissolution suffered the split of the New Centre-Right (NCD). Since the 2014 European Parliament election most opinion polls have calculated the Union of the Centre (UdC) together with the NCD, even after December 2016, when the two parties parted ways. Since December 2014 results for Lega Nord (LN) have included its sister party Us with Salvini (NcS). Since November 2015 Left Ecology Freedom (SEL) started to be polled as Italian Left (SI), before finally be merged into it in February 2017. In the same month splinters from the Democratic Party (PD) and the Italian Left formed Article One (MDP), while other leftists launched the short-lived Progressive Camp (CP). In March 2017 the NCD was transformed into Popular Alternative (AP). In December 2017 the MDP, SI and minor groups launched a joint list named Free and Equal (LeU).

In the run-up of the election several other electoral lists were formed, notably including More Europe (+Eu), Together, Power to the People (PaP), Us with Italy (NcI) and the Popular Civic List (CP). Moreover, two broader alliances were formed: the centre-left coalition and the centre-right coalition.

Some polls may include the Communist Refoundation Party (PRC) instead of PaP.

=== Graphical summary ===
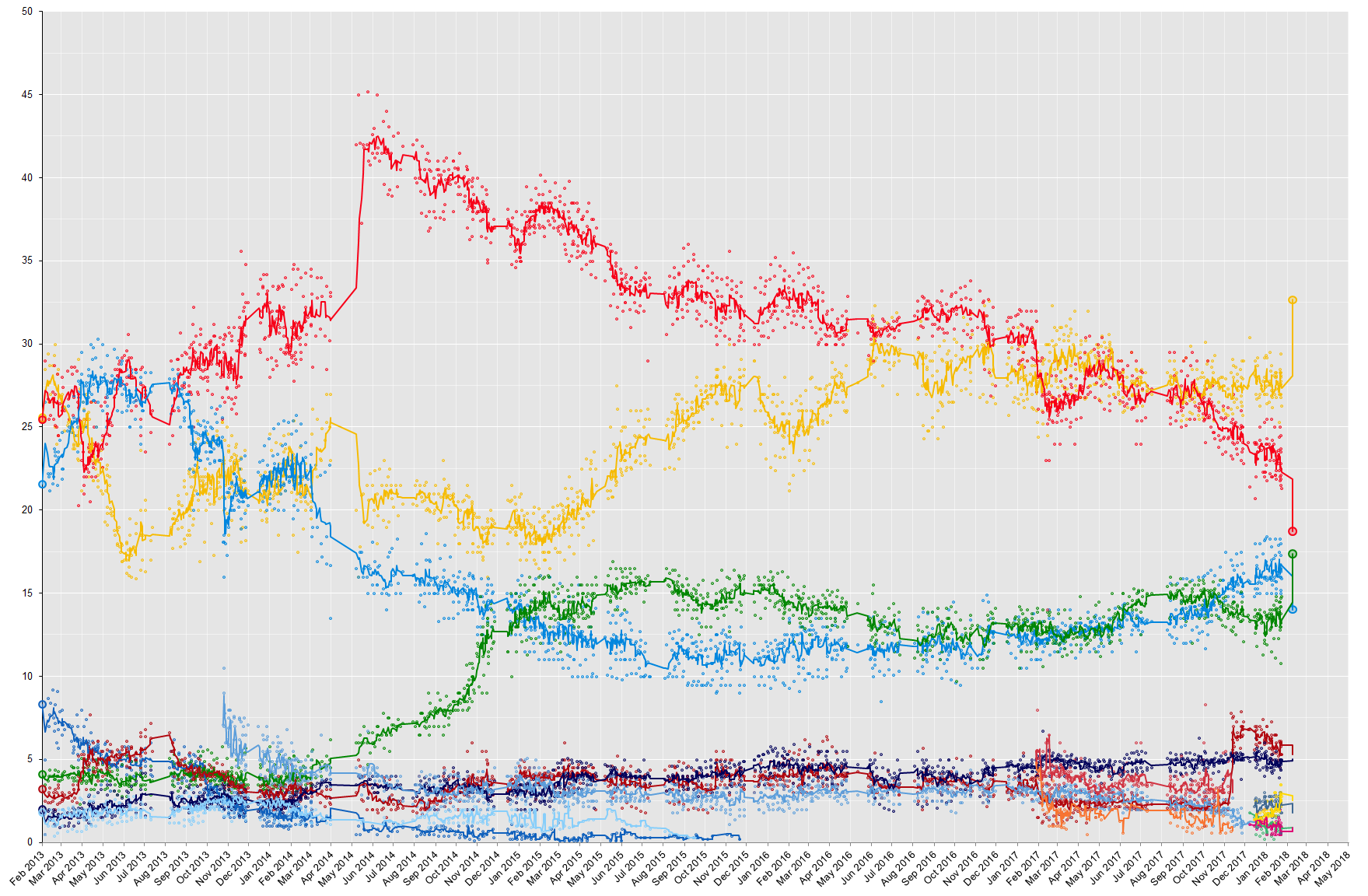
6-point average trend line of poll results from 25 February 2013 to the present day, with each line corresponding to a political party. PD M5S PdL/FI SC NCD/AP LN SEL / SI / LeU FdI UdC MDP CP +Eu I CP NcI PaP CPI

=== 2018 ===
Date	Polling firm	Sample size	CSX				CDX				M5S	LeU	PaP	CPI	Others	Lead
Date	Polling firm	Sample size	PD	+Eu	I	CP	FI	LN	FdI	NcI	M5S	LeU	PaP	CPI	Others	Lead
4 Mar 2018	General election	–	18.8	2.6	0.6	0.5	14.0	17.4	4.3	1.3	32.7	3.4	1.1	0.9	2.4	13.9
12–16 Feb	Termometro Politico	4,500	21.3	2.8	0.9	0.9	15.9	14.8	5.0	1.8	26.3	5.3	1.7	1.8	1.5	5.0
14–15 Feb	Demopolis	2,000	22.5	2.5	2.0		16.5	14.2	5.0	2.3	28.0	6.0			1.0	5.5
14 Feb	Euromedia	800	22.1	2.3	0.8	0.5	17.3	14.2	4.8	2.3	26.8	5.8		0.6	2.1	4.7
13–14 Feb	Piepoli	505	24.5	3.0	1.0	0.5	16.0	13.0	5.0	3.0	27.0	6.0		0.5	0.5	2.5
12–14 Feb	Demos	1,014	21.9	3.5			16.3	13.2	4.8		27.8	6.1			6.4	5.9
12–14 Feb	Ixè	1,000	21.5	3.5	0.6	0.7	18.0	10.8	4.7	1.8	28.1	6.0	2.0		2.3	6.6
12–14 Feb	Index	800	22.8	2.2	1.0	1.2	16.4	13.8	4.9	2.4	27.6	5.9			1.8	4.8
12–14 Feb	SWG	2,000	23.5	2.9	0.8	1.0	15.2	13.4	4.4	2.2	28.3	5.9	0.9		1.5	4.8
5–14 Feb	Demetra	6,006	23.7	2.6	0.5	0.6	15.0	14.7	4.4	0.6	29.4	5.3	1.3	0.6	1.3	5.7
13 Feb	IPR	–	22.0	2.8	1.0	2.0	16.5	14.5	4.5	3.0	28.5	4.5	1.0	0.5		6.5
13 Feb	Piepoli	–	25.0	2.5	1.0	0.5	16.0	13.0	5.0	2.5	27.0	6.0		0.5	1.0	2.0
12–13 Feb	Tecnè	1,001	21.8	2.6			18.3	12.8	5.0	2.9	28.3	5.3			3.0	6.5
12 Feb	Euromedia	800	22.4	2.0	0.7	0.5	17.5	14.1	4.8	2.2	27.0	6.1		0.8	1.9	4.6
8–12 Feb	Bidimedia	1,300	24.4	1.9	1.0	1.4	16.3	14.5	3.9	2.5	25.3	4.6	1.2	1.1	1.9	0.9
9–11 Feb	EMG	1,614	22.8	2.1	1.6	1.0	16.1	13.9	4.6	2.8	27.3	5.2	0.8	0.6	1.2	4.5
8–11 Feb	Lorien	1,000	23.6	1.2	0.8	1.5	17.9	12.3	4.6	1.2	27.6	5.0	2.7	1.5	0.2	4.0
8 Feb	SWG	1,000	23.3	2.8	0.8	1.3	15.7	13.1	4.8	2.0	28.0	6.5	0.7		1.0	4.7
8 Feb	Index	800	23.5	1.9	1.5	1.1	15.7	14.1	5.0	2.6	27.3	6.0			1.3	3.8
7–8 Feb	Demopolis	1,000	22.8				16.3	14.0	4.7		28.3	5.8			8.1	5.5
6–8 Feb	EMG	1,683	22.4	2.0	1.6	1.0	15.0	14.6	4.6	2.8	28.1	5.7			2.2	5.7
3–8 Feb	Termometro Politico	3,500	21.9	2.1	0.7	0.5	15.3	14.8	5.5	2.0	26.8	5.3	1.5	1.9	1.7	4.9
6–7 Feb	Tecnè	1,003	22.1	1.6			18.3	13.2	4.9	2.9	28.0	5.7			3.3	5.9
5–7 Feb	Ixè	1,000	22.1	3.0	0.8	0.7	17.3	11.1	4.8	2.0	28.3	6.5	1.3		2.1	6.2
5 Feb	Piepoli	500	25.0	3.0	1.0	0.5	16.0	14.0	5.0	2.5	27.0	6.5		0.2	0.3	2.0
2–4 Feb	EMG	1,742	23.0	1.9	1.6	1.0	15.8	14.3	4.6	2.8	27.2	5.4			2.0	4.2
1–4 Feb	Lorien	1,000	24.0	1.2	0.2	1.6	17.1	12.3	4.4	1.6	28.1	5.7	2.4	1.1	0.3	4.1
30 Jan–2 Feb	Bidimedia	1,235	24.2	1.6	1.2	1.6	16.2	13.3	4.2	2.2	26.2	5.0	1.1	0.9	2.3	2.0
22 Jan–2 Feb	Termometro Politico	4,000	22.0	1.9	1.2	0.6	15.5	14.0	5.3	1.5	26.8	5.6	1.6	1.8	2.3	4.8
1 Feb	Euromedia	800	23.8	1.6	1.1	0.8	17.8	13.8	4.5	2.3	27.2	5.7		0.7	0.3	3.4
1 Feb	Index	800	23.8	1.6	1.8	1.1	15.8	13.7	5.0	2.5	26.9	6.3			1.7	3.1
1 Feb	Piepoli	800	25.5	2.5	0.5	0.5	15.0	13.0	4.5	2.5	27.5	6.5		0.5	–	2.0
30 Jan–1 Feb	EMG	1,702	23.8	1.6	1.8	1.0	16.0	13.6	4.8	2.8	26.9	5.3			2.0	3.1
29 Jan–1 Feb	Ixè	1,000	22.0	2.6	0.4	0.8	17.0	11.5	4.3	2.0	28.7	7.3	1.2		2.2	6.7
29–31 Jan	SWG	1,500	23.7	2.0	1.0	1.1	15.9	12.9	5.1	2.3	28.4	6.0	0.5		1.1	4.7
29 Jan	Tecnè	898	22.2	1.6			18.3	12.8	5.1	2.8	27.8	6.2			3.2	5.6
28–29 Jan	Demopolis	1,500	23.0				16.0	14.0	4.5		29.5	6.0				6.5
26–28 Jan	EMG	1,778	24.0	1.6	1.7	1.0	15.9	13.8	5.0	2.8	26.5	5.7			2.0	2.5
25 Jan	Euromedia	800	24.3	1.5	0.6	1.1	18.4	13.6	4.5	2.1	26.4	6.0		0.5	1.0	2.1
25 Jan	Index	800	24.0	1.3	1.6	1.0	15.8	13.7	5.2	2.1	27.0	6.5			1.8	3.0
25 Jan	Piepoli	506	25.5	2.5	0.5	0.5	15.0	13.5	4.5	2.5	27.5	7.0			1.0	2.0
22–25 Jan	Ixè	1,000	21.8	2.0	0.7	0.9	16.7	11.9	4.4	2.2	29.2	7.0			3.2	7.4
23–24 Jan	Ipsos	1,000	22.7	4.0			16.9	13.7	4.6	1.1	29.3	6.1			1.6	6.6
22–24 Jan	SWG	1,500	24.0	1.5	0.9	1.3	16.0	13.0	5.5	2.2	27.8	6.4	0.4		0.6	3.8
22–23 Jan	Tecnè	1,501	22.3	1.7			18.3	12.5	5.3	2.8	27.4	6.3			3.4	5.1
22 Jan	Lorien	1,000	25.3	1.1	0.2	1.4	15.9	12.2	4.0	1.4	29.2	5.9			1.5	3.9
22 Jan	IPR	–	22.0	2.0	1.0	2.0	16.0	12.0	6.0	3.0	28.0	6.0			2.0	6.0
19–22 Jan	Tecnè	801	22.3	1.8			18.2	12.6	5.4	2.8	27.0	6.2			3.7	4.7
19–21 Jan	EMG	1,803	23.7	1.4	1.6	1.0	16.0	13.9	5.1	2.7	27.0	6.1			1.1	3.3
17–19 Jan	Ixè	1,000	22.3	1.9	0.6	1.2	17.4	11.3	4.5	2.5	27.8	7.4			3.1	5.5
16–17 Jan	Index	800	24.0	1.4	1.5	1.0	15.6	13.6	5.3	1.5	27.5	6.5			1.1	3.5
15–17 Jan	SWG	1,500	23.6	1.2	0.8	1.3	16.0	13.2	5.7	2.0	27.3	6.8	0.7		1.4	3.7
15 Jan	Piepoli	810	25.0	1.5	1.0	1.0	15.0	14.0	5.0	2.5	27.0	7.0			1.0	2.0
15 Jan	Euromedia	800	24.2	1.8	0.4	1.2	18.0	13.5	4.4	2.4	26.3	6.0		0.6	1.2	2.1
12–14 Jan	EMG	1,889	23.8	1.4	1.5	1.1	15.7	13.8	5.5	2.6	26.8	6.0			1.4	3.0
10–11 Jan	Demopolis	1,500	23.5	3.5			15.6	13.8	5.0	1.9	29.2	6.5			1.0	5.7
10–11 Jan	Ipsos	998	23.1	1.2	1.4	1.8	16.5	13.8	4.7	0.9	28.7	6.4	0.7		0.8	5.6
9–11 Jan	EMG	1,611	23.5	1.3	1.5	1.1	15.3	13.5	5.5	2.4	27.9	5.8			2.2	4.4
8–10 Jan	Ixè	2,000	23.1	1.7		1.7	17.2	11.8	4.9	2.4	27.8	7.0			2.4	4.7
8–10 Jan	Index	800	24.0	1.5	1.7	0.8	15.0	13.7	5.4	1.6	28.0	6.2			2.1	4.0
8–10 Jan	SWG	1,500	23.1	1.3	0.9	1.4	16.7	13.1	5.7	1.6	26.7	6.8	0.7		2.0	3.6
9 Jan	IPR	–	22.0	2.5	0.5	2.5	16.0	13.0	6.3	2.7	28.0	5.0			1.5	6.0
6–9 Jan	Bidimedia	1,143	24.1	1.3	1.0	1.4	16.1	12.9	4.5	2.5	27.0	5.9	0.9	0.6	1.8	2.9
8 Jan	Tecnè	1,000	20.7	4.3			18.0	12.6	5.3	2.6	28.1	6.7			1.7	7.4
6–8 Jan	Demopolis	1,000	24.0	2.5			15.3	14.0	5.0	1.9	29.0	7.0			1.3	5.0
5–7 Jan	EMG	1,603	24.1	1.4	1.5	1.0	14.8	13.6	5.5	2.2	28.2	5.6			2.1	4.1

=== 2017 ===
Date	Polling firm	M5S	PD	FI	LN	SI	FdI	AP	MDP	CP/ AP	LeU	Others	Lead
29–31 Dec	Winpoll	30.4	21.4	15.7	13.3	w. LeU	4.9	w. CP	w. LeU	w. I	6.8	7.5	9.0
28 Dec	YouTrend	27.5	24.1	15.8	13.7	w. LeU	5.1	1.2	w. LeU	w. I	6.8	5.8	3.4
22 Dec	Ixè	29.0	22.8	16.2	12.1	w. LeU	5.0	1.2	w. LeU	w. I	7.3	6.4	6.2
21 Dec	YouTrend	27.3	24.1	15.4	13.4	w. LeU	5.1	1.3	w. LeU	w. I	6.8	6.3	3.2
19–20 Dec	Index	27.9	23.7	15.4	14.0	w. LeU	5.3		w. LeU	w. I	6.5	7.2	4.2
18–20 Dec	SWG	25.7	25.0	14.8	13.7	w. LeU	5.3	1.3	w. LeU	w. I	7.0	7.2	0.7
19 Dec	Euromedia	26.3	23.5	16.8	14.5	w. LeU	5.0	0.6	w. LeU	w. I	6.4	6.9	2.8
18–19 Dec	Demopolis	29.0	25.0	15.0	14.0	w. LeU	5.0		w. LeU	w. I	7.0	5.0	4.0
18 Dec	Piepoli	28.0	26.0	15.0	14.0	w. LeU	5.0	1.0	w. LeU	w. I	7.0	4.0	2.0
17–18 Dec	Tecnè	26.9	23.0	17.5	14.1	w. LeU	5.3	0.9	w. LeU	w. I	7.9	4.4	3.9
14–18 Dec	Bidimedia	26.5	25.1	15.8	13.3	w. LeU	3.8	2.1	w. LeU	w. I	6.4	7.0	1.4
14–17 Dec	EMG	28.5	24.9	15.0	13.3	w. LeU	5.4	1.2	w. LeU	w. I	5.7	6.0	3.6
14 Dec	YouTrend	27.2	24.4	15.5	13.5	w. LeU	5.0	1.8	w. LeU	w. I	6.4	6.3	1.6
12–13 Dec	Index	27.8	24.1	15.6	13.6	w. LeU	5.3		w. LeU		6.2	7.4	3.7
12–13 Dec	Ipsos	28.2	23.4	16.7	14.3	w. LeU	5.0	2.0	w. LeU		6.6	3.8	4.8
11–13 Dec	SWG	26.2	25.0	15.1	14.2	w. LeU	5.0	1.1	w. LeU		6.4	7.0	1.2
10–11 Dec	Tecnè	26.7	23.7	17.4	14.0	w. LeU	5.4	1.1	w. LeU		7.3	4.4	3.0
7–10 Dec	EMG	28.6	25.3	15.7	12.5	w. LeU	5.2	1.4	w. LeU		5.4	5.9	3.3
7–8 Dec	Euromedia	26.5	24.0	16.4	14.5	w. LeU	5.0	1.0	w. LeU		5.8	6.8	2.5
7 Dec	Piepoli	28.0	27.0	14.5	14.5	w. LeU	5.0	2.0	w. LeU		7.0	2.0	1.0
7 Dec	YouTrend	26.8	24.9	15.4	13.6	w. LeU	5.2	1.9	w. LeU		6.0	6.4	1.9
6–7 Dec	Demopolis	27.5	25.2	14.8	14.1	w. LeU	4.9		w. LeU		6.0	7.5	2.3
4–7 Dec	Demos	28.7	25.0	15.2	13.0	w. LeU	4.8		w. LeU		7.6	5.7	3.7
5–6 Dec	Ixè	27.5	23.1	15.8	12.7	w. LeU	5.4	1.3	w. LeU		7.5	6.7	4.4
5–6 Dec	Index	27.5	24.1	15.5	13.8	w. LeU	5.3	1.3	w. LeU		6.2	6.3	3.4
5–6 Dec	Ipsos	29.1	24.4	16.7	14.4	w. LeU	4.9	2.7	w. LeU		6.6	1.2	4.7
4–6 Dec	SWG	25.8	25.5	15.5	13.8	w. LeU	5.3	2.0	w. LeU		5.6	6.5	0.3
3–4 Dec	Tecnè	26.1	23.3	17.0	14.2	w. LeU	5.4	1.6	w. LeU		7.8	4.6	2.8
1–3 Dec	EMG	28.3	25.3	15.3	12.8	w. LeU	5.3	1.5	w. LeU	0.7	5.2	5.6	3.0
30 Nov	YouTrend	27.0	24.4	15.6	13.7	2.4	5.0	2.1	3.0		Did not exist	6.8	3.0
28–29 Nov	Index	27.3	24.3	15.3	14.3	2.0	5.1	1.7	3.4		Did not exist	6.6	3.0
27–29 Nov	SWG	25.7	26.2	14.8	13.5	w. MDP	5.1	2.6	4.9	1.2	Did not exist	6.0	0.5
26 Nov	Tecnè	25.8	23.5	17.5	14.8	2.6	4.9	1.9	4.0		Did not exist	5.0	2.3
24–26 Nov	EMG	27.9	25.6	14.6	13.0	w. MDP	5.3	1.7	5.5	0.6	Did not exist	5.8	2.3
23 Nov	YouTrend	27.5	24.4	15.1	14.3	2.4	4.9	2.1	3.0		Did not exist	6.7	3.1
21–22 Nov	Index	27.5	24.3	15.0	14.7	2.0	5.0	1.8	3.2		Did not exist	6.5	3.2
20–22 Nov	SWG	26.1	25.5	14.5	14.0	w. MDP	4.8	2.6	5.4	1.6	Did not exist	5.5	0.6
18–22 Nov	Bidimedia	26.0	26.3	15.8	13.9	2.4	3.8	2.1	3.0	1.1	Did not exist	5.6	0.3
20–21 Nov	Ixè	28.0	23.4	15.8	13.1	3.0	5.0	2.0	3.2		Did not exist	6.5	4.6
17–19 Nov	EMG	28.0	25.6	14.2	13.4	1.9	5.2	1.8	3.4	0.8	Did not exist	5.7	2.4
17–18 Nov	Tecnè	27.4	24.2	16.6	15.8	2.3	5.0	1.7	3.1	0.6	Did not exist	3.3	3.2
16 Nov	YouTrend	27.3	24.9	14.8	14.4	2.2	4.8	1.9	3.1		Did not exist	6.6	2.4
15 Nov	Index	27.5	24.5	14.6	15.0	2.0	5.0	1.8	3.1		Did not exist	6.5	3.0
13–15 Nov	SWG	26.5	25.9	13.6	14.8	2.4	4.3	2.5	2.8	1.2	Did not exist	6.0	0.6
13–15 Nov	Ixè	27.9	23.8	15.5	13.5	2.7	4.8	2.1	3.3		Did not exist	6.4	4.1
10–12 Nov	EMG	27.7	26.0	14.0	13.7	1.9	5.4	1.8	3.3	0.7	Did not exist	5.5	1.7
8–9 Nov	Ipsos	29.3	24.3	16.1	15.3	2.5	5.1	2.6	2.8		Did not exist	2.0	5.0
8 Nov	YouTrend	27.6	25.5	14.9	15.0	2.3	4.7	2.0	3.0		Did not exist	5.0	2.1
8 Nov	Index	27.8	24.7	14.3	15.2	2.0	5.0	1.7	3.1	3.2	Did not exist	3.0	3.1
6–8 Nov	SWG	25.4	26.3	14.3	14.5	2.1	4.6	2.5	2.9	1.6	Did not exist	5.8	0.9
6–7 Nov	Euromedia	28.3	24.7	15.5	15.7	2.0	4.2	1.0	2.7	1.6	Did not exist	4.3	3.6
6 Nov	Piepoli	29.0	27.5	14.0	14.5	2.0	5.0	2.0	3.5		Did not exist	2.5	1.5
4–5 Nov	EMG	28.6	26.5	13.3	13.7	2.0	5.0	1.8	3.1	0.6	Did not exist	5.4	2.1
3–4 Nov	Tecnè	27.0	25.0	16.4	15.2	2.3	5.0	1.8	3.8		Did not exist	3.5	2.0
2 Nov	YouTrend	27.7	26.7	14.3	14.8	2.3	4.7	2.4	3.2		Did not exist	3.9	1.0
31 Oct–1 Nov	Index	27.4	25.6	14.0	15.1	2.0	4.9	2.0	3.0		Did not exist	6.0	1.8
30 Oct–1 Nov	SWG	26.5	25.7	13.3	15.0	2.4	4.8	2.5	2.6	1.4	Did not exist	5.8	0.8
30 Oct	Piepoli	29.0	29.0	12.5	14.5	2.0	4.5	2.5	3.5		Did not exist	2.5	0.0
30 Oct	Tecnè	26.3	25.6	16.2	15.2	2.3	4.8	2.2	3.5		Did not exist	3.9	0.7
28–29 Oct	EMG	28.8	26.5	13.2	13.6	2.0	5.0	2.0	3.0	0.6	Did not exist	5.3	2.3
26–28 Oct	Bidimedia	26.1	27.3	14.3	13.8	2.8	4.3	2.7	3.2	1.0	Did not exist	4.5	1.2
27 Oct	Termometro Politico	30.1	24.1	11.7	14.3	w. MDP	5.4	1.5	8.3	1.4	Did not exist	3.2	6.0
26 Oct	IPR	27.0	25.5	14.0	13.5	1.0	5.5	3.0	3.5	2.5	Did not exist	4.5	1.5
25–26 Oct	Ipsos	27.5	25.5	16.1	15.2	2.6	4.5	3.1	2.8		Did not exist	2.7	2.0
24–25 Oct	Index	27.1	25.4	14.0	15.6	2.0	5.0	2.0	3.0		Did not exist	5.9	1.7
24–25 Oct	Demopolis	28.0	26.5	14.0	15.3	w. MDP	4.7	2.0	6.0		Did not exist	3.5	1.5
23–25 Oct	SWG	27.0	26.8	13.7	14.6	2.0	4.4	2.6	2.4	1.2	Did not exist	4.4	0.2
23 Oct	Tecnè	25.6	25.8	16.0	15.8	2.5	4.9	2.0	3.8		Did not exist	3.6	0.2
22 Oct	Ixè	26.9	26.7	14.1	15.0	w. MDP	4.7	2.1	5.0		Did not exist	5.5	0.2
21–22 Oct	EMG	28.3	26.4	12.7	14.3	2.0	5.0	2.2	2.6	0.9	Did not exist	5.6	1.9
19–20 Oct	Demopolis	28.0	27.0	14.0	15.2	2.2	4.9	2.1	3.8		Did not exist	2.8	1.0
17–18 Oct	Index	26.9	26.0	14.3	14.7	2.0	5.0	2.0	3.2		Did not exist	5.9	0.9
16–18 Oct	SWG	25.5	26.4	13.6	15.8	2.0	4.8	2.8	2.9	1.8	Did not exist	4.4	0.9
12–18 Oct	ScenariPolitici	26.2	27.0	12.6	13.5	1.9	6.3	2.0	4.2	0.8	Did not exist	5.5	0.8
16 Oct	Tecnè	25.7	26.2	16.0	15.5	2.1	5.2	2.0	3.6		Did not exist	3.6	0.5
14–15 Oct	EMG	27.9	27.1	12.2	14.8	2.0	5.0	2.2	2.4	0.9	Did not exist	5.1	0.8
14 Oct	Piepoli	28.5	29.0	13.0	14.0	2.0	4.5	2.5	3.5		Did not exist	3.0	1.0
9–12 Oct	Demos	27.6	26.3	14.2	14.6	2.2	5.0	2.2	3.7	2.2	Did not exist	2.2	1.3
10–11 Oct	Index	26.8	25.5	14.2	14.8	2.1	5.3	2.0	3.0		Did not exist	6.3	1.3
9–11 Oct	SWG	26.5	27.2	14.2	15.5	2.1	4.3	2.6	2.6	1.5	Did not exist	3.5	0.7
8 Oct	Ixè	27.2	27.4	13.6	15.1	2.0	3.7	1.6	3.1	1.6	Did not exist	4.7	0.2
7–8 Oct	EMG	27.3	27.7	12.8	14.5	2.1	5.0	2.2	2.2	1.0	Did not exist	5.2	0.4
7 Oct	Piepoli	28.5	29.5	13.5	12.0	2.0	5.0	3.0	3.5		Did not exist	3.0	1.0
6–7 Oct	Tecnè	25.8	26.7	15.8	15.3	2.2	5.2	2.1	3.7	0.6	Did not exist	2.6	0.9
5 Oct	Lorien	29.9	28.7	12.1	14.7	1.7	3.8	2.5		3.5	Did not exist	3.1	1.2
5 Oct	Lorien	29.5	30.4	15.1	17.0	w. MDP	w. LN	w. FI	8.0	w. PD	Did not exist	0.0	0.9
3–4 Oct	Index	26.6	25.5	14.2	14.6	2.2	5.4	2.0	2.8		Did not exist	6.7	1.1
2–4 Oct	SWG	25.9	26.9	14.0	15.7	2.5	4.6	3.0	3.2	1.7	Did not exist	2.5	1.0
29 Sep–1 Oct	EMG	27.0	28.1	13.5	13.9	2.0	5.1	2.3	2.3	0.9	Did not exist	5.8	1.1
29–30 Sep	Tecnè	25.5	26.4	15.9	15.5	2.4	5.0	2.1	4.1	0.7	Did not exist	2.4	0.9
27–28 Sep	Index	26.8	25.1	14.1	14.8	2.3	5.4	2.0	3.0		Did not exist	6.5	1.7
25–27 Sep	SWG	26.5	27.1	13.1	15.5	2.2	4.5	2.7	2.9	2.0	Did not exist	3.5	0.6
25 Sep	Piepoli	29.0	29.0	12.0	13.5	2.5	5.0	2.5	3.5		Did not exist	3.0	0.0
24 Sep	Tecnè	25.7	26.2	15.9	15.3	2.6	5.1	1.9	4.0	0.9	Did not exist	2.4	0.5
20–22 Sep	Bidimedia	25.4	27.5	14.0	14.0	2.7	4.1	2.8		5.2	Did not exist	4.3	2.1
20–22 Sep	EMG	27.1	28.4	13.0	14.4	2.0	5.1	2.2	2.4		Did not exist	5.4	1.3
21 Sep	Euromedia	26.7	26.0	14.5	14.6	2.2	4.1	1.6	3.4	3.2	Did not exist	3.7	0.7
21 Sep	Index	26.5	25.0	13.8	15.0	2.4	5.3	2.0	3.2		Did not exist	6.8	1.5
18–20 Sep	SWG	26.8	26.8	13.5	15.9	2.4	4.2	2.7	2.6	1.8	Did not exist	3.3	0.0
16 Sep	Tecnè	26.4	25.9	15.6	15.2	2.6	5.0	2.0	3.8	1.0	Did not exist	2.5	0.5
13–15 Sep	EMG	28.3	27.8	12.3	14.9	2.1	5.1	2.2	2.7		Did not exist	4.6	0.5
14 Sep	Index	27.5	25.4	13.6	14.7	2.2	5.3	2.0	3.0		Did not exist	6.3	2.1
13–14 Sep	Demopolis	28.2	27.0	14.0	15.0	2.3	5.0	2.2	4.0		Did not exist	2.0	1.2
11–13 Sep	SWG	26.8	27.3	13.6	15.5	2.3	4.3	2.5	3.0	1.8	Did not exist	2.9	0.5
11 Sep	Lorien	29.0	28.1	13.0	14.8	2.8	4.0	2.8	2.0	1.5	Did not exist	2.0	0.9
11 Sep	Piepoli	28.5	29.5	12.0	13.5	2.5	5.0	2.5	3.5		Did not exist	3.0	1.0
6–8 Sep	EMG	28.0	27.3	12.4	15.5	2.1	5.0	2.3	2.8		Did not exist	4.6	0.7
6 Sep	Tecnè	27.6	25.6	14.6	15.1	2.5	4.4	2.2	4.0	1.2	Did not exist	2.8	2.0
5–6 Sep	Ipsos	26.6	26.5	15.6	15.0	2.6	5.0	2.2	3.6		Did not exist	2.9	0.1
4–6 Sep	Demos	28.1	26.8	13.2	13.6	2.4	4.8	2.0	3.8	2.0	Did not exist	3.3	1.3
4–6 Sep	SWG	26.8	26.6	13.4	16.0	2.3	4.3	2.7	2.7	1.8	Did not exist	3.0	0.2
5 Sep	Index	28.0	25.2	13.4	14.7	2.2	5.4	2.0	3.1		Did not exist	6.0	2.8
4 Sep	Piepoli	29.0	29.5	12.5	13.5	2.5	4.5	2.5	3.5		Did not exist	2.5	0.5
30 Aug–1 Sep	EMG	28.3	26.6	12.8	15.4	2.1	5.1	2.4	2.9		Did not exist	4.4	1.7
28 Aug	Piepoli	29.2	29.2	12.0	13.3	2.5	4.2	2.5	3.2		Did not exist	3.5	0.0
9 Aug	Ixè	27.0	27.3	13.3	15.0	2.3	4.5	2.5	3.5		Did not exist	4.6	0.3
2 Aug	Ixè	27.1	27.5	13.4	14.9	2.4	4.4	2.5	3.4		Did not exist	4.4	0.4
31 Jul–2 Aug	SWG	27.2	27.0	13.2	15.0	2.0	4.5	2.8	3.5	1.9	Did not exist	2.9	0.2
31 Jul	Index	28.3	25.6	13.3	14.4	2.2	5.4	2.0	3.5		Did not exist	5.3	2.7
26 Jul	Ixè	27.2	27.3	13.5	14.8	2.7	4.3	2.6	3.5		Did not exist	4.1	0.1
24–26 Jul	SWG	26.3	28.3	12.7	15.2	2.1	4.8	3.0	4.1		Did not exist	3.5	2.0
25 Jul	Index	28.5	25.4	13.2	14.4	2.1	5.5	2.0	3.6		Did not exist	5.3	3.1
24 Jul	Piepoli	28.0	28.4	13.3	13.9	2.3	4.5	2.7	3.6		Did not exist	3.5	0.4
24 Jul	IPR	28.0	24.0	12.5	12.5	2.0	5.0	3.0	6.0		Did not exist	7.0	4.0
20–21 Jul	Ipsos	27.6	26.9	15.1	15.1	2.0	4.9	2.0	3.8		Did not exist	2.6	0.7
19–21 Jul	EMG	28.0	26.7	12.8	15.2	2.1	5.3	2.5	3.4		Did not exist	4.0	1.3
19 Jul	Ixè	27.0	27.5	13.7	14.6	2.9	4.2	2.5	3.6		Did not exist	4.0	0.5
17–19 Jul	SWG	26.3	27.9	13.6	15.0	2.3	4.4	3.2	3.8		Did not exist	3.5	1.6
18 Jul	Index	28.4	25.4	13.1	14.5	2.1	5.5	2.0	3.7		Did not exist	5.3	3.0
17 Jul	Piepoli	28.5	29.0	13.0	13.5	2.0	4.5	2.5	3.5		Did not exist	3.5	0.5
17 Jul	IPR	28.5	24.0	11.5	14.0		5.0	3.0	6.0		Did not exist	8.0	4.5
12–14 Jul	EMG	27.8	26.2	13.1	15.3	2.1	5.4	2.5	3.5		Did not exist	4.1	1.6
12 Jul	Ixè	26.9	27.6	13.9	14.3	2.9	4.4	2.6	3.7		Did not exist	3.7	0.7
11–12 Jul	Demopolis	27.0	26.2	13.7	14.0	2.6	4.8	3.0	3.9		Did not exist	2.0	0.8
10–12 Jul	SWG	26.9	28.1	12.8	14.6	2.7	4.3	3.4	4.0		Did not exist	3.2	1.2
11 Jul	Index	27.8	26.1	13.4	14.2	2.2	5.4	2.0	3.8		Did not exist	5.1	1.7
10 Jul	Piepoli	29.5	29.5	12.5	13.5	2.0	4.0	3.0	3.0		Did not exist	3.0	0.0
5–7 Jul	EMG	27.2	26.7	13.8	14.8	2.1	5.1	2.4	3.7		Did not exist	4.2	0.5
4–5 Jul	SWG	26.2	28.7	13.8	14.4	2.6	4.3	3.2	3.8		Did not exist	3.0	2.5
4 Jul	Index	28.0	26.4	13.4	13.9	2.2	5.3	2.0	4.8		Did not exist	4.0	1.6
28–30 Jun	EMG	27.4	27.1	13.6	14.3	2.1	5.1	2.4	3.5		Did not exist	4.5	0.3
27–30 Jun	Demos	26.0	26.3	14.4	13.8	2.9	4.7	2.1	4.3	2.3	Did not exist	3.2	0.3
28 Jun	Tecnè	28.4	27.2	14.1	13.6	2.4	4.3	2.4	4.5	0.6	Did not exist	2.5	1.2
28 Jun	Ixè	26.8	27.4	13.7	14.0	2.8	4.4	2.9	3.4		Did not exist	4.6	0.6
27–28 Jun	Demopolis	28.0	26.5	13.5	13.7	2.5	4.8	3.1	3.7		Did not exist	4.2	1.5
27–28 Jun	Ipsos	28.3	27.8	14.3	15.0	2.8	4.2	1.8	2.9		Did not exist	2.9	0.5
26–28 Jun	SWG	25.9	28.5	13.0	15.0	2.5	4.1	3.1	3.8		Did not exist	4.1	2.6
26 Jun	Piepoli	29.0	29.0	12.0	13.0	2.5	4.0	3.0	3.0		Did not exist	4.5	0.0
22–23 Jun	Demopolis	28.2	28.0	12.9	13.1		4.5	3.0	3.2		Did not exist	7.1	0.2
21–23 Jun	Bidimedia	26.4	28.3	12.5	12.2	2.9	4.3	3.2	4.1	1.3	Did not exist	4.8	1.9
21–23 Jun	EMG	28.0	26.6	14.1	14.1	2.2	4.9	2.5	3.7		Did not exist	3.9	1.4
21 Jun	Ixè	27.0	28.0	13.5	13.4	2.7	4.2	3.0	3.3		Did not exist	4.9	1.0
19–21 Jun	SWG	27.1	29.0	13.1	14.2	2.2	4.2	3.3	3.6		Did not exist	3.3	1.9
14–16 Jun	EMG	28.4	26.8	14.1	13.8	2.2	4.9	2.6	3.6		Did not exist	3.7	1.6
14 Jun	Ixè	27.0	28.1	13.3	13.6	2.8	4.2	2.5	3.0		Did not exist	5.5	1.1
12–14 Jun	SWG	27.0	28.5	12.8	13.5	2.5	4.7	3.2	4.3		Did not exist	3.5	1.5
12 Jun	Lorien	29.5	28.6	12.5	15.0	2.0	3.0	3.0	2.0	2.0	Did not exist	2.4	0.9
11–12 Jun	Piepoli	29.0	29.5	11.5	12.5	2.5	4.0	3.0	3.0		Did not exist	5.0	0.5
11 Jun	Tecnè	29.7	29.2	13.5	12.1	2.6	3.8	3.2		4.5	Did not exist	1.4	0.5
7–9 Jun	EMG	29.8	27.4	13.1	13.4	2.2	4.7	2.6	3.2		Did not exist	3.6	2.4
8 Jun	Index	30.1	26.4	13.1	13.0	w. MDP	4.9	2.0		7.5	Did not exist	3.0	3.7
8 Jun	IPR	30.0	26.0	12.0	12.0	2.0	5.0	3.0	4.0		Did not exist	6.0	4.0
7 Jun	Ixè	27.9	29.1	12.9	13.0	2.6	4.3	2.4	3.0		Did not exist	4.8	1.2
6–7 Jun	Ipsos	30.6	29.3	13.5	12.4	2.7	4.8	2.1	2.7		Did not exist	1.9	1.3
5–7 Jun	SWG	26.9	29.6	12.2	14.0	2.8	4.1	2.8	4.0		Did not exist	3.6	2.7
5–6 Jun	Demopolis	29.0	28.0	12.4	12.5		4.5	3.0	3.2		Did not exist	7.4	1.0
5–6 Jun	Demopolis	29.0	28.0	12.4	16.5	w. MDP	w. LN	3.0		6.0	Did not exist	2.1	1.0
1–3 Jun	EMG	29.8	27.6	13.1	13.1	2.2	4.6	2.7	2.9		Did not exist	4.0	2.2
1 Jun	Index	30.1	26.1	13.2	12.9	2.2	4.9	2.0	3.6		Did not exist	5.0	4.0
29–31 May	SWG	27.8	29.5	11.8	13.6	2.6	5.0	3.0	3.5		Did not exist	3.2	1.7
29 May	Ixè	27.6	29.0	13.2	12.7	2.5	4.4	2.5	3.1		Did not exist	5.0	1.4
27–28 May	Ipsos	30.5	30.4	13.2	12.8	2.2	4.6	2.1	2.8		Did not exist	1.4	0.1
25–27 May	EMG	29.9	27.5	13.0	12.9	2.2	4.6	2.7	3.2		Did not exist	4.0	2.4
25–27 May	Bidimedia	26.5	28.8	12.2	12.0	2.8	3.6	3.1	4.4	1.4	Did not exist	5.2	2.3
25–26 May	ScenariPolitici	28.1	27.9	12.3	11.2	1.7	4.5	3.2	2.8	1.9	Did not exist	6.4	0.2
25 May	Index	29.2	26.6	13.5	12.7	2.3	4.9	2.1	3.5		Did not exist	5.1	2.6
24 May	Ixè	28.0	29.3	13.0	12.6	2.4	4.3	2.6	2.7		Did not exist	5.1	1.3
22–24 May	SWG	26.7	29.0	11.8	14.5	2.5	4.9	3.3	4.0		Did not exist	3.3	2.3
22 May	Piepoli	28.5	29.5	11.5	12.5	2.5	4.0	3.0	3.0		Did not exist	5.5	1.0
21–22 May	Ipsos	29.8	30.9	12.5	12.7	2.4	5.0	2.3	2.3		Did not exist	2.1	1.1
18–20 May	EMG	30.0	27.7	13.3	12.7	2.1	4.5	2.5	3.0		Did not exist	4.2	2.3
19 May	Lorien	29.2	28.2	13.7	14.3	2.5	3.0	2.8	2.3	1.5	Did not exist	2.5	1.0
18–19 May	ScenariPolitici	27.6	28.1	12.5	11.5	1.5	4.3	3.5	3.3	2.0	Did not exist	5.7	0.5
18 May	Index	29.3	26.8	13.5	12.5	2.2	4.8	2.2	3.4		Did not exist	5.3	2.5
17 May	Ixè	28.5	28.6	12.9	12.4	2.4	4.6	2.8	2.8		Did not exist	5.0	0.1
15–17 May	SWG	27.6	29.7	11.7	13.6	2.7	4.5	3.1	3.7		Did not exist	3.4	2.1
11–13 May	EMG	29.6	28.1	13.3	12.9	2.0	4.3	2.6	3.1		Did not exist	4.1	1.5
11 May	Index	29.5	27.1	13.2	12.2	2.1	4.8	2.3	3.6		Did not exist	5.2	2.4
8–11 May	Demos	27.5	28.5	13.3	12.9	2.8	4.0	2.0	3.8	2.0	Did not exist	3.2	1.0
10 May	Ixè	28.1	28.4	12.8	12.6	2.4	4.4	3.1	3.0		Did not exist	5.2	0.3
8–10 May	SWG	27.5	30.5	11.5	13.0	2.5	5.0	2.8	3.7		Did not exist	3.5	3.0
8 May	Euromedia	29.3	27.4	13.9	13.5	2.3	4.8	3.0	2.4	1.5	Did not exist	1.9	1.9
8 May	Tecnè	32.0	27.0	12.5	12.0	2.5	4.5	2.5	3.5	0.5	Did not exist	3.0	5.0
4–6 May	EMG	29.0	28.5	13.0	12.4	2.0	4.6	2.8	3.5		Did not exist	4.2	0.5
3–5 May	ScenariPolitici	26.8	28.2	12.3	11.9	1.2	4.7	3.5	3.5	2.2	Did not exist	5.7	1.4
3–4 May	Ipsos	30.2	30.4	13.1	12.3	2.1	4.8	3.0	2.4		Did not exist	1.7	0.2
3 May	Index	29.4	26.8	13.1	12.2	2.3	4.9	2.5	3.8		Did not exist	5.0	2.6
3 May	Ixè	28.2	27.9	12.4	12.8	2.5	4.5	3.2	3.6		Did not exist	4.9	0.3
2–3 May	SWG	26.7	29.5	12.3	12.8	2.4	5.1	3.0	4.2		Did not exist	4.0	2.8
28–30 Apr	EMG	28.6	27.4	12.7	12.5	2.0	4.9	3.2	4.0		Did not exist	4.7	1.2
27 Apr	Index	30.2	25.6	13.2	12.4	2.4	4.9	2.6	4.0		Did not exist	4.7	4.6
25–27 Apr	Bidimedia	26.8	27.5	11.9	11.7	3.1	3.8	3.1	5.1	1.6	Did not exist	5.4	0.7
24–27 Apr	Demopolis	30.0	27.2	12.7	12.8	2.5	4.9	3.0	4.2		Did not exist	2.7	2.8
26 Apr	Ixè	28.4	27.3	12.6	12.9	2.4	4.6	3.1	3.7		Did not exist	4.8	1.1
26 Apr	Lorien	29.5	26.8	13.2	14.8	2.1	3.7	3.0	3.1	1.8	Did not exist	2.0	2.7
24–26 Apr	SWG	27.3	29.2	11.5	13.5	2.6	4.6	3.2	3.7		Did not exist	3.9	1.9
21–23 Apr	EMG	29.4	26.8	13.2	12.4	1.9	4.8	3.0	4.0		Did not exist	4.5	2.6
20–21 Apr	ScenariPolitici	27.2	27.9	13.0	11.9	1.3	5.1	3.0	3.4	2.1	Did not exist	5.1	0.7
20 Apr	Index	30.6	25.5	13.0	12.4	2.5	5.0	2.6	4.0		Did not exist	4.4	5.1
19 Apr	Ixè	28.5	26.9	12.8	12.9	2.5	4.8	3.1	4.0		Did not exist	4.5	1.6
17–19 Apr	SWG	27.5	28.8	11.1	13.2	2.9	4.5	3.5	3.4		Did not exist	4.1	1.3
18 Apr	IPR	32.0	24.0	13.0	13.0	2.0	4.5	3.5	5.0		Did not exist	3.0	8.0
13–16 Apr	EMG	30.0	26.8	12.9	12.3	1.8	4.8	2.7	3.9		Did not exist	4.8	3.2
13–14 Apr	ScenariPolitici	27.0	27.4	12.8	11.5	1.5	5.3	3.2	3.7	2.3	Did not exist	5.3	0.4
12–13 Apr	Ipsos	30.7	27.6	13.1	12.9	2.4	5.2	3.4	2.6		Did not exist	2.1	3.1
12 Apr	Index	30.9	25.3	12.8	12.7	2.5	5.0	2.7	3.9		Did not exist	4.2	5.6
12 Apr	Ixè	28.7	26.6	12.9	12.7	2.6	4.6	3.0	4.3		Did not exist	4.6	2.1
10–12 Apr	SWG	28.0	28.1	11.9	12.9	2.8	4.6	3.5	3.9		Did not exist	4.3	0.1
11 Apr	Euromedia	28.0	26.2	14.0	13.5	2.8	4.7	1.5	3.0	1.8	Did not exist	4.5	1.8
11 Apr	Tecnè	31.5	25.0	13.0	12.5	1.5	5.0	2.5	4.5	1.5	Did not exist	3.0	6.5
8–9 Apr	Demopolis	30.2	27.0	12.5	12.7	2.4	4.9	3.2	4.3		Did not exist	2.8	3.2
6–9 Apr	EMG	30.5	26.6	12.4	12.7	1.7	4.9	2.9	3.7		Did not exist	4.6	3.9
7 Apr	Lorien	29.2	27.4	12.6	14.0	3.1	3.4	3.1	2.6	2.3	Did not exist	2.3	1.8
5–7 Apr	ScenariPolitici	27.3	26.8	12.4	11.3	1.4	5.2	3.5	4.0	2.5	Did not exist	5.6	0.5
6 Apr	Index	31.1	25.5	12.6	12.4	2.5	4.9	2.7	3.9	0.8	Did not exist	3.6	5.6
5 Apr	Ixè	28.5	26.4	13.1	12.6	2.4	4.5	2.8	4.4		Did not exist	5.3	2.1
3–5 Apr	SWG	27.9	28.5	12.3	12.1	2.5	4.8	3.4	4.2		Did not exist	4.3	0.6
3 Apr	Lorien	29.2	27.4	12.6	14.0	3.1	3.4	3.1	2.6	2.3	Did not exist	2.3	1.8
1–3 Apr	Bidimedia	27.3	27.0	11.7	11.7	2.8	4.0	3.0	5.5	2.0	Did not exist	5.0	0.3
1–2 Apr	Demopolis	30.2	26.5	12.3	12.7	2.5	5.0	3.1	4.5	1.2	Did not exist	2.0	3.7
31 Mar–2 Apr	EMG	30.6	27.0	12.0	12.3	1.7	4.7	3.1	3.6	0.9	Did not exist	4.1	3.6
29–31 Mar	ScenariPolitici	27.5	26.1	13.2	11.2	1.3	5.0	3.3	4.3	2.8	Did not exist	5.3	1.4
30 Mar	Index	31.0	25.4	12.5	12.3	2.4	5.0	2.7	4.1	0.9	Did not exist	3.7	5.6
29 Mar	Ixè	28.4	26.5	12.8	12.4	2.4	4.7	3.1	4.6		Did not exist	5.1	1.9
27–29 Mar	SWG	28.3	27.8	11.7	12.3	2.6	5.2	3.3	4.7		Did not exist	4.1	0.5
28 Mar	IPR	31.0	24.0	12.0	12.0	2.5	5.0	4.0	6.0		Did not exist	3.5	7.0
27 Mar	Piepoli	29.0	29.0	11.5	12.5	2.5	4.5	3.0	3.5		Did not exist	4.5	0.0
24–26 Mar	EMG	30.3	26.9	11.9	11.9	1.7	4.9	3.4	4.0	1.0	Did not exist	4.0	3.4
22–24 Mar	ScenariPolitici	27.4	25.7	13.0	11.5	1.2	5.2	3.1	4.3	3.2	Did not exist	5.4	1.7
25 Mar	Euromedia	26.7	25.9	14.0	13.8	3.1	5.3	1.8	3.3	2.0	Did not exist	4.1	0.8
23 Mar	Index	30.8	25.3	12.7	12.5	2.5	5.0	2.6	4.0	1.0	Did not exist	3.6	5.5
22 Mar	Ixè	27.9	26.4	12.8	12.2	2.6	4.9	2.5	4.3		Did not exist	6.4	1.5
21–22 Mar	Demopolis	30.0	26.0	12.0	12.8	2.5	5.0	3.2	4.6	1.4	Did not exist	2.5	4.0
20–22 Mar	SWG	27.8	28.1	12.2	12.0	2.2	5.1	3.5	5.0		Did not exist	4.1	0.3
20 Mar	IPR	31.0	24.0	12.0	13.0	3.0	5.0	4.5	5.0		Did not exist	2.5	7.0
20 Mar	Piepoli	28.5	29.0	11.5	12.5	2.5	4.5	3.0	3.5		Did not exist	5.0	0.5
17–19 Mar	EMG	29.9	26.8	12.4	12.2	1.6	5.0	2.9	4.3	1.0	Did not exist	3.9	3.1
15–17 Mar	ScenariPolitici	26.5	25.3	13.5	12.0	1.1	5.4	2.8	4.6	3.7	Did not exist	5.1	1.2
16 Mar	Index	30.2	25.4	12.4	12.9	2.5	5.2	2.5	4.2	1.0	Did not exist	3.7	4.8
13–16 Mar	Ipsos	32.3	26.8	12.7	12.8	2.7	4.6	2.8	3.3		Did not exist	2.0	5.5
15 Mar	Ixè	27.5	26.5	12.4	12.7	2.9	5.2	2.6	4.2		Did not exist	6.0	1.0
13–15 Mar	SWG	26.9	28.1	13.0	12.4	2.3	4.9	3.3	4.7		Did not exist	4.5	1.2
13 Mar	Lorien	29.5	27.0	11.3	13.9	2.7	4.0	2.8	3.2	2.8	Did not exist	2.8	2.5
12 Mar	Euromedia	26.4	25.5	14.0	13.7	3.5	5.6	2.0	3.0	2.3	Did not exist	4.0	0.9
12 Mar	Tecnè	29.0	23.0	13.5	13.0	2.0	5.5	1.5	6.5	2.0	Did not exist	4.0	6.0
10–12 Mar	EMG	30.0	27.1	12.2	12.9	1.4	4.9	2.6	4.2	1.0	Did not exist	3.7	2.9
9 Mar	Index	30.0	25.2	12.0	13.9	2.7	5.0	2.7	4.5		Did not exist	4.0	4.8
6–9 Mar	Bidimedia	26.1	26.7	12.2	12.2	2.5	4.5	2.8	6.0	2.7	Did not exist	4.3	0.6
6–9 Mar	Bidimedia	24.5	26.0	12.0	12.0	w. MDP	4.5	3.0	14.0		Did not exist	4.0	1.5
8 Mar	Ixè	27.6	27.0	12.3	12.6	3.5	5.2	2.6	3.6		Did not exist	5.6	0.6
6–8 Mar	SWG	27.6	28.2	12.3	12.7	1.5	4.9	3.4	3.6	1.8	Did not exist	4.0	0.6
7 Mar	IPR	30.0	23.0	12.0	13.0	4.0	5.0	3.5	6.0		Did not exist	3.5	7.0
3–5 Mar	EMG	29.1	27.6	11.8	13.3	1.7	5.1	2.5	4.0		Did not exist	4.9	1.5
1–3 Mar	ScenariPolitici	25.2	25.9	13.3	12.2	1.3	4.7	2.7	5.5	3.6	Did not exist	5.6	0.7
1–3 Mar	ScenariPolitici	25.2	25.9	13.3	12.2	w. MDP	4.7	2.7	11.2		Did not exist	4.8	0.7
1–3 Mar	ScenariPolitici	25.2	25.9	13.3	12.2	0.8	4.7	2.7	10.2		Did not exist	5.0	0.7
2 Mar	Index	29.0	27.0	12.0	14.0	3.0	5.0	2.7	3.5		Did not exist	3.8	2.0
1–2 Mar	Demos	28.8	27.2	11.5	10.6	4.3	6.7	2.4	4.2	2.0	Did not exist	2.3	1.6
1 Mar	Ixè	27.1	26.9	12.7	12.8	3.4	5.2	2.6	2.9		Did not exist	6.4	0.2
27 Feb–1 Mar	SWG	26.0	29.2	12.2	13.1	1.2	4.6	3.2	4.0	2.3	Did not exist	4.2	3.2
27 Feb	Piepoli	28.0	29.0	11.0	12.5	3.0	4.5	3.0	4.0		Did not exist	5.0	1.0
24–26 Feb	EMG	28.4	28.0	12.2	13.3	2.4	4.9	2.7	3.8		Did not exist	4.3	0.4
22–24 Feb	ScenariPolitici	24.4	26.1	13.3	12.6	1.5	5.1	2.5	5.1	4.5	Did not exist	4.9	1.7
23 Feb	Index	29.2	28.1	12.0	13.9	4.1	4.8	3.1			Did not exist	4.8	1.1
23 Feb	Lorien	29.5	29.0	11.8	14.1	3.2	4.0	3.1			Did not exist	5.3	0.5
22 Feb	Piepoli	28.0	29.0	11.0	12.5	w. MDP	4.5	3.0	8.0		Did not exist	4.0	1.0
22 Feb	Ixè	27.8	28.1	12.9	13.0	4.1	4.5	3.6			Did not exist	6.0	0.3
20–22 Feb	SWG	25.3	28.0	12.8	12.9	1.5	5.2	3.3	3.2	3.9	Did not exist	3.9	2.7
19–21 Feb	Bidimedia	26.0	27.1	11.9	11.7	3.0	4.3	2.6	5.5	4.8	Did not exist	3.1	1.1
19–21 Feb	Bidimedia	27.1	31.4	12.2	11.9	5.1	4.0	3.0	Did not exist	Did not exist	Did not exist	5.3	4.3
20 Feb	IPR	28.0	29.0	13.0	13.0	4.0	5.0	3.5	Did not exist	Did not exist	Did not exist	4.5	1.0
20 Feb	Piepoli	27.5	32.0	11.0	12.0	3.0	4.5	3.0	Did not exist	Did not exist	Did not exist	7.0	4.5
17–19 Feb	EMG	28.7	29.8	12.1	13.2	3.9	4.5	2.9	Did not exist	Did not exist	Did not exist	4.9	1.1
16–17 Feb	ScenariPolitici	26.1	29.1	13.8	13.2	3.7	4.5	2.5	Did not exist	Did not exist	Did not exist	7.1	3.0
15–16 Feb	Ipsos	30.9	30.1	13.0	12.8	2.0	4.3	3.3	Did not exist	Did not exist	Did not exist	3.6	0.8
15 Feb	Index	28.7	29.2	12.0	13.8	3.8	4.8	3.0	Did not exist	Did not exist	Did not exist	4.7	0.5
13–15 Feb	Ixè	27.0	30.4	12.6	13.5	3.9	4.3	2.5	Did not exist	Did not exist	Did not exist	5.8	3.4
13–15 Feb	SWG	26.2	31.0	13.2	13.0	2.6	5.0	3.4	Did not exist	Did not exist	Did not exist	5.6	4.8
13 Feb	Piepoli	27.5	32.0	11.0	11.5	3.0	4.5	3.0	Did not exist	Did not exist	Did not exist	7.5	4.5
10–12 Feb	EMG	28.2	30.8	12.1	13.1	3.8	4.7	3.0	Did not exist	Did not exist	Did not exist	4.3	2.6
8 Feb	Index	29.0	29.0	11.9	14.0	3.6	4.6	3.2	Did not exist	Did not exist	Did not exist	4.7	0.0
6–8 Feb	Ixè	27.6	31.0	12.5	13.3	3.4	4.1	3.3	Did not exist	Did not exist	Did not exist	4.8	3.4
6–8 Feb	SWG	26.7	30.9	13.4	12.8	2.9	4.7	3.5	Did not exist	Did not exist	Did not exist	5.1	4.2
6 Feb	Piepoli	27.0	32.0	10.5	11.5	3.0	4.5	3.0	Did not exist	Did not exist	Did not exist	8.5	5.0
3–5 Feb	EMG	28.1	30.5	12.1	13.5	3.4	4.6	3.3	Did not exist	Did not exist	Did not exist	4.5	2.4
1–3 Feb	ScenariPolitici	26.2	28.6	13.2	13.1	4.3	4.5	2.8	Did not exist	Did not exist	Did not exist	7.3	2.4
1–2 Feb	Demos	26.6	29.5	13.2	13.4	5.4	5.2	3.5	Did not exist	Did not exist	Did not exist	3.2	2.9
1 Feb	Index	29.5	29.1	12.0	13.8	3.6	4.7	3.1	Did not exist	Did not exist	Did not exist	4.2	0.4
1 Feb	Ixè	29.9	31.1	12.4	13.1	2.9	3.4	2.4	Did not exist	Did not exist	Did not exist	4.8	1.2
30 Jan–1 Feb	SWG	27.3	30.5	12.9	12.8	3.2	4.5	3.7	Did not exist	Did not exist	Did not exist	5.1	3.2
30 Jan	Piepoli	27.0	32.0	10.5	11.5	3.0	4.5	3.5	Did not exist	Did not exist	Did not exist	8.0	5.0
27–29 Jan	EMG	28.0	31.2	11.6	14.0	3.0	4.5	3.3	Did not exist	Did not exist	Did not exist	4.4	3.2
28 Jan	Tecnè	30.5	29.0	13.0	13.0	3.0	5.0	3.0	Did not exist	Did not exist	Did not exist	3.5	1.5
27 Jan	Lorien	29.9	28.5	12.3	14.2	3.8	3.9	2.9	Did not exist	Did not exist	Did not exist	4.5	1.4
24–27 Jan	Bidimedia	27.9	32.1	12.2	10.5	4.0	4.1	3.7	Did not exist	Did not exist	Did not exist	5.5	4.2
25–26 Jan	Demopolis	29.0	30.0	11.8	13.2	3.7	4.7	3.5	Did not exist	Did not exist	Did not exist	4.1	1.0
25–26 Jan	ScenariPolitici	26.4	28.8	13.6	13.4	4.0	3.9	3.1	Did not exist	Did not exist	Did not exist	6.8	2.4
24–25 Jan	SWG	26.7	31.8	12.9	12.5	3.0	4.3	3.8	Did not exist	Did not exist	Did not exist	5.0	5.1
24–25 Jan	Ipsos	31.0	29.7	12.5	12.4	3.0	4.7	3.3	Did not exist	Did not exist	Did not exist	3.4	1.3
20–22 Jan	EMG	28.3	31.7	11.1	13.6	3.1	4.6	3.0	Did not exist	Did not exist	Did not exist	4.6	3.4
18–20 Jan	ScenariPolitici	26.8	28.4	13.4	13.5	3.9	4.2	2.8	Did not exist	Did not exist	Did not exist	7.0	1.6
17–18 Jan	SWG	26.5	31.0	13.1	13.2	2.7	4.6	3.8	Did not exist	Did not exist	Did not exist	5.1	4.5
16 Jan	Tecnè	29.8	30.1	12.9	12.5	2.9	4.7	3.2	Did not exist	Did not exist	Did not exist	3.9	0.3
13–15 Jan	EMG	27.7	31.6	11.4	13.1	3.0	4.9	2.7	Did not exist	Did not exist	Did not exist	5.6	3.9
11 Jan	Index	29.2	29.5	12.0	13.2	4.0	4.6	3.0	Did not exist	Did not exist	Did not exist	4.5	0.3
10–11 Jan	Ipsos	30.9	30.1	12.4	12.5	3.0	4.4	3.6	Did not exist	Did not exist	Did not exist	3.1	0.8
10–11 Jan	SWG	25.7	31.6	13.0	13.2	2.6	4.8	3.8	Did not exist	Did not exist	Did not exist	5.3	5.9
9 Jan	Tecnè	28.8	30.5	13.4	12.1	3.1	4.6	3.5	Did not exist	Did not exist	Did not exist	4.0	1.7
7–9 Jan	EMG	27.5	31.4	12.1	13.4	3.0	4.8	3.5	Did not exist	Did not exist	Did not exist	4.3	3.9

=== 2016 ===
Date	Polling firm	M5S	PD	FI	LN	SI	FdI	AP	Others	Lead
22–23 Dec	ScenariPolitici	26.4	27.5	13.2	14.1	4.1	4.4	3.1	7.2	1.1
20–21 Dec	Ipsos	30.0	30.3	12.7	12.0	2.9	4.5	3.8	3.8	0.3
20 Dec	Demopolis	28.5	31.0	12.0	13.5	4.1	4.5	3.4	3.0	2.5
19–20 Dec	SWG	26.8	32.2	12.4	12.6	2.8	4.6	3.6	5.0	5.0
12–20 Dec	Demos	28.4	30.2	12.7	13.2	5.0	4.4	3.4	2.7	1.8
17–18 Dec	EMG	27.6	30.6	12.7	13.8	3.2	4.5	3.2	4.4	3.0
15–16 Dec	ScenariPolitici	28.1	26.9	13.5	13.9	3.8	4.2	2.8	6.8	1.2
14 Dec	Index	32.6	28.3	11.6	12.2	4.1	4.1	2.8	4.3	4.3
13–14 Dec	SWG	28.5	31.0	12.6	13.0	2.8	4.3	3.7	4.1	2.5
13 Dec	Ixè	30.7	32.7	12.1	13.4	2.8	2.5	2.4	3.4	2.0
13 Dec	IPR	30.0	30.0	13.0	13.0	3.5	4.5	3.0	3.0	0.0
13 Dec	Tecnè	30.0	30.0	14.5	11.5	3.0	4.5	3.0	3.5	0.0
10–11 Dec	EMG	29.2	31.1	11.2	13.7	3.6	4.2	3.6	3.4	1.9
10 Dec	Tecnè	30.1	30.2	14.9	11.1	2.2	4.6	2.6	4.3	0.1
9–10 Dec	ScenariPolitici	26.5	31.7	12.7	12.8	3.3	4.3	2.6	6.1	5.2
7–8 Dec	Ipsos	31.7	29.8	11.9	11.9	3.2	4.8	3.8	3.1	1.9
7 Dec	Index	32.3	28.5	11.9	12.3	4.0	4.2	2.9	3.9	3.8
5–6 Dec	SWG	28.9	32.6	11.6	12.8	2.9	4.0	3.4	3.8	3.7
5 Dec	Piepoli	27.0	32.5	11.0	11.0	3.0	5.0	3.0	7.5	5.5
5 Dec	Tecnè	29.6	31.4	14.6	10.5	2.4	4.2	2.4	4.9	1.8
2–3 Dec	EMG	30.0	30.9	11.4	12.9	3.5	4.4	3.7	3.2	0.9
27–30 Nov	Bidimedia	26.8	33.2	13.0	11.0	3.7	2.8	3.2	6.3	6.4
25–27 Nov	EMG	29.9	31.0	10.5	13.1	3.5	4.2	3.5	3.8	1.1
17–19 Nov	EMG	30.6	30.8	10.5	13.1	3.1	4.2	3.4	4.3	0.2
17 Nov	Lorien	31.8	31.5	11.0	12.0	3.5	3.7	3.5	2.2	0.3
16 Nov	Ixè	28.3	33.8	11.3	12.6	3.3	2.9	2.8	5.0	5.5
14–16 Nov	SWG	27.8	32.0	11.8	12.9	3.4	4.0	3.2	4.9	4.2
14–16 Nov	Demos	29.8	30.4	12.0	13.7	5.2	3.5	4.4	1.0	0.6
13–16 Nov	Bidimedia	27.0	32.7	13.4	11.1	4.2	3.1	3.1	5.4	5.7
10–12 Nov	EMG	31.2	30.6	11.4	12.0	3.4	4.1	3.6	3.7	0.6
9–10 Nov	SWG	27.3	32.8	12.4	12.6	3.2	3.6	3.3	4.8	5.5
9 Nov	Ixè	28.5	33.5	10.8	12.9	3.6	3.2	2.8	4.7	5.0
4–6 Nov	EMG	31.6	30.8	11.1	11.8	3.6	4.0	3.5	3.6	0.8
4 Nov	Euromedia	29.7	29.9	12.5	12.2	3.6	5.0	2.4	1.8	0.2
2–3 Nov	SWG	27.2	32.7	11.6	12.2	3.2	3.9	3.2	6.0	5.5
2 Nov	Ixè	29.1	33.4	9.5	13.4	3.7	3.2	2.4	5.3	4.3
26–27 Oct	SWG	27.5	32.1	12.0	12.6	3.3	4.1	3.0	5.4	4.6
24–27 Oct	Demos	30.1	31.8	11.8	9.7	5.1	4.2	4.3	3.0	1.7
26 Oct	Ixè	29.3	33.1	9.6	13.9	4.0	2.9	1.8	5.4	3.8
21–23 Oct	EMG	30.3	30.9	11.7	11.7	3.7	4.0	3.4	4.3	0.6
21–22 Oct	Tecnè	26.5	32.0	14.5	13.0	3.0	4.5	3.0	3.5	5.5
19–20 Oct	SWG	26.5	33.0	12.6	12.0	3.5	3.9	3.1	5.4	6.5
19 Oct	Ixè	29.0	32.9	9.8	14.2	4.3	2.5	1.9	5.4	3.9
15–16 Oct	EMG	29.6	31.5	11.3	12.3	4.0	4.1	3.4	3.8	1.9
15 Oct	IPR	27.0	32.0	11.5	13.5	3.5	5.0	2.5	5.0	5.0
14–15 Oct	Tecnè	26.5	31.5	14.0	13.5	3.5	5.0	2.5	3.5	5.0
13 Oct	Lorien	31.5	31.7	11.0	13.5	3.2	3.5	3.1	2.5	0.2
13 Oct	Index	29.4	30.7	11.0	12.4	4.0	4.3	4.0	4.2	1.3
12–13 Oct	SWG	27.1	31.4	13.0	12.3	3.6	4.0	3.0	5.6	4.3
12 Oct	Ixè	28.9	32.4	10.3	14.1	3.9	2.4	2.3	5.7	3.3
8–9 Oct	EMG	30.2	30.7	10.8	12.8	3.8	4.2	3.4	4.1	0.5
6–7 Oct	ScenariPolitici	25.0	31.9	13.2	12.3	3.8	4.5	3.1	6.2	6.9
6 Oct	Index	29.0	30.9	11.5	12.1	3.9	4.3	4.0	4.3	1.9
5–6 Oct	SWG	26.3	31.8	13.2	13.1	3.5	3.6	3.2	5.5	5.5
5 Oct	Ixè	29.1	33.2	9.9	13.3	3.9	2.5	2.5	5.6	4.1
3–5 Oct	Bidimedia	26.4	32.3	12.5	11.5	4.1	2.9	3.0	7.5	5.9
3 Oct	Piepoli	26.5	32.5	11.0	11.0	3.0	5.0	4.0	7.0	6.0
1–2 Oct	EMG	29.9	31.0	11.4	12.6	3.6	4.2	3.5	3.8	1.2
29–30 Sep	ScenariPolitici	24.3	31.8	13.5	12.5	3.9	4.6	3.0	6.4	7.5
28–29 Sep	SWG	26.0	30.9	13.4	14.1	3.6	3.5	3.4	5.1	4.9
28 Sep	Ixè	28.4	32.6	10.5	13.6	3.6	2.1	2.5	6.7	4.2
24–25 Sep	EMG	29.5	31.2	11.9	12.1	3.9	4.3	3.3	3.8	1.7
21–22 Sep	SWG	25.6	30.5	13.9	13.9	3.9	3.7	3.4	5.1	4.9
21 Sep	Ixè	28.1	32.0	11.2	12.5	3.9	2.5	2.5	7.3	3.9
20–21 Sep	Index	29.0	31.2	11.2	11.8	4.0	4.2	4.0	4.6	2.2
19–21 Sep	ScenariPolitici	25.0	32.3	12.9	12.3	3.6	4.5	3.1	6.3	7.3
17–18 Sep	EMG	29.0	32.4	11.9	11.6	3.8	4.3	3.1	3.9	3.4
15–16 Sep	ScenariPolitici	24.8	32.6	12.6	12.1	3.8	4.6	3.3	6.3	7.8
14–15 Sep	SWG	24.8	31.5	13.8	13.9	3.5	4.1	3.6	4.8	6.7
14 Sep	Ixè	28.6	32.6	10.9	13.0	3.7	2.3	2.7	6.2	4.0
12–14 Sep	Demopolis	28.5	32.0	11.5	12.0	4.4	4.5	3.6	3.5	3.5
12 Sep	Piepoli	27.0	31.5	11.0	12.0	2.5	5.0	3.0	8.0	4.5
12 Sep	Index	29.3	31.5	11.3	11.6	4.1	4.3	3.8	4.1	2.2
10–11 Sep	EMG	29.2	32.4	12.4	11.6	3.7	4.1	3.1	3.5	3.2
8–9 Sep	ScenariPolitici	24.3	32.8	12.4	12.2	4.2	4.8	2.5	6.8	8.5
7–8 Sep	SWG	25.1	31.0	13.9	14.1	3.4	3.9	3.4	5.2	5.9
6–8 Sep	Demos&Pi	28.8	32.1	10.2	11.0	5.7	4.5	3.8	3.9	3.3
7 Sep	Ixè	29.4	32.9	10.6	12.7	4.0	2.2	2.8	5.2	3.5
7 Sep	Piepoli	27.5	32.0	11.5	12.0	2.0	5.0	3.0	7.0	4.5
3–4 Sep	EMG	31.4	31.1	12.0	11.3	3.3	4.3	3.2	3.4	0.3
31 Aug–1 Sep	SWG	29.5	30.4	13.6	12.8	2.5	3.9	3.5	3.8	0.9
31 Aug	Ixè	30.3	32.6	10.3	13.1	4.1	2.3	2.7	4.6	2.3
31 Aug	Piepoli	27.0	32.0	11.5	11.5	3.0	5.5	3.5	6.0	5.0
24–26 Aug	ScenariPolitici	28.8	31.7	12.0	11.1	3.7	4.6	2.5	5.3	2.9
3–5 Aug	ScenariPolitici	29.7	31.2	12.1	11.3	3.6	4.4	2.3	4.4	1.5
3–4 Aug	SWG	29.0	30.8	13.4	13.0	2.9	3.5	3.6	3.8	1.8
3 Aug	Ixè	29.5	31.6	10.3	13.9	2.9	3.8	2.3	6.7	2.1
1 Aug	Piepoli	27.0	31.5	11.5	12.0	3.5	5.0	3.5	2.5	4.5
30–31 Jul	EMG	31.9	31.4	11.5	11.8	3.3	4.0	3.3	2.8	0.5
27–28 Jul	ScenariPolitici	29.4	30.8	12.5	11.5	3.7	4.2	2.9	4.3	1.4
27–28 Jul	SWG	28.9	30.4	12.8	13.7	3.1	3.9	3.6	3.6	1.5
27 Jul	Ixè	28.7	31.4	10.1	14.4	3.5	1.9	2.3	7.7	2.7
23–24 Jul	EMG	31.6	31.0	12.0	12.6	3.2	3.9	3.2	2.5	0.6
20–21 Jul	SWG	28.5	30.6	12.9	13.2	3.3	4.1	3.7	3.7	2.1
20 Jul	Ixè	28.9	31.2	10.4	14.1	3.5	2.0	2.5	7.4	2.3
16–18 Jul	Demopolis	30.0	30.5	11.0	12.6	4.3	4.4	3.5	3.7	0.5
16–17 Jul	EMG	31.3	30.8	12.5	13.0	3.0	3.0	2.9	2.8	0.5
13–14 Jul	SWG	29.0	31.0	13.3	12.7	3.4	3.8	3.6	3.2	2.0
13 Jul	Ixè	29.0	31.4	10.1	13.6	3.4	2.1	2.7	7.7	2.4
11 Jul	Piepoli	27.5	31.5	11.5	12.0	3.5	4.5	3.5	6.0	4.0
9–10 Jul	EMG	30.9	30.9	13.2	13.4	2.7	3.8	2.9	2.2	0.0
8 Jul	IPR	30.0	30.0	8.5	13.0	3.5	5.3	2.7	7.0	0.0
6–7 Jul	SWG	29.5	30.5	13.1	13.2	3.4	3.3	3.5	3.5	1.0
6 Jul	Ixè	29.5	30.9	10.3	13.3	3.5	2.3	2.9	3.1	1.4
2–3 Jul	EMG	31.0	30.6	12.9	13.7	3.0	4.0	3.1	1.7	0.4
29 Jun–1 Jul	ScenariPolitici	29.2	30.5	12.0	12.2	4.0	4.5	3.1	4.5	1.3
29–30 Jun	SWG	30.4	30.7	12.1	12.5	3.5	3.9	3.5	3.4	0.3
29 Jun	Piepoli	28.0	31.0	11.0	12.0	3.0	5.0	3.5	6.5	3.0
29 Jun	Ixè	29.0	31.2	10.7	13.9	3.7	2.7	3.6	5.2	2.2
27–29 Jun	Demos&Pi	32.3	30.2	11.5	11.8	5.4	2.7	2.5	3.6	2.1
27 Jun	Lorien	31.4	30.5	10.0	15.5	3.0	3.2	2.8	3.6	0.9
27 Jun	Euromedia	28.9	29.0	13.6	13.0	3.0	4.8	2.3	1.9	0.1
26 Jun	Lorien	30.0	31.5	10.5	15.0	3.0	3.0	3.0	4.0	1.5
25–26 Jun	EMG	31.7	31.2	11.7	12.4	3.4	4.3	3.3	2.0	0.5
23–24 Jun	ScenariPolitici	28.8	30.3	11.8	12.2	4.2	4.7	3.2	4.8	1.5
23 Jun	Ixè	28.2	31.0	11.1	13.0	4.1	3.1	3.9	5.6	2.8
22–23 Jun	SWG	30.0	31.3	11.7	12.8	3.3	3.8	3.3	4.0	1.3
22 Jun	Piepoli	27.5	31.0	11.5	12.0	3.5	5.0	3.5	6.0	3.5
21–22 Jun	Demopolis	29.0	31.0	11.0	13.5	4.2	5.0	3.5	2.0	2.0
20 Jun	Euromedia	28.5	29.3	13.6	13.1	3.4	4.5	2.5	5.1	0.8
18–19 Jun	EMG	29.1	31.4	11.7	13.4	3.9	4.5	3.1	2.9	2.3
3–4 Jun	EMG	27.7	30.7	11.9	14.4	4.3	4.7	2.9	3.4	3.0
20 May	CISE	30.8	32.9	11.8	11.8	4.2	4.2	2.4	1.9	2.1
18–19 May	IPR	26.0	31.5	10.5	13.5	4.0	5.5	3.0	6.0	5.5
18 May	Ixè	28.7	30.6	11.9	14.2	4.0	3.7	2.6	3.5	1.9
17–18 May	SWG	25.9	32.0	12.0	14.5	4.2	4.0	3.8	3.6	6.1
17–18 May	Demopolis	27.0	31.2	10.3	14.4	4.5	4.8	3.7	2.0	4.2
16 May	Euromedia	26.0	30.5	13.3	13.3	3.8	5.0	2.8	5.3	4.5
14–15 May	EMG	27.7	30.6	12.0	14.2	4.2	4.7	2.8	3.8	2.9
13 May	IPR	26.5	31.0	11.0	14.0	3.0	5.5	3.0	6.0	4.5
13 May	Tecnè	27.5	30.0	13.0	14.0	4.0	4.5	3.0	4.0	2.5
11–12 May	SWG	27.2	31.7	11.6	14.7	4.0	3.5	3.7	3.6	4.5
10–11 May	Demopolis	28.0	31.0	10.0	14.5	4.5	4.8	3.6	3.6	3.0
11 May	Ixè	28.2	30.4	12.3	14.0	4.6	3.6	2.3	4.6	2.2
7–8 May	EMG	28.3	30.3	12.2	13.9	4.0	4.6	2.8	3.9	2.0
5 May	Piepoli	26.5	31.5	12.0	13.0	3.5	5.0	2.5	6.0	5.0
4–5 May	SWG	27.5	31.3	11.3	15.2	3.5	4.0	3.4	3.6	3.9
4 May	Ixè	28.1	30.5	11.6	14.8	5.4	3.2	2.8	3.6	1.9
3 May	IPR	27.0	30.0	11.0	14.0	4.0	5.5	3.0	5.5	3.0
2 May	Euromedia	26.5	30.5	13.1	13.3	3.9	4.7	3.0	5.0	4.0
2 May	Tecnè	28.5	30.0	13.5	13.5	3.5	4.5	3.5	3.0	1.5
30 Apr–1 May	EMG	28.0	30.7	11.6	14.3	4.3	4.6	2.7	3.8	2.7
27–28 Apr	SWG	28.0	32.1	11.1	14.5	3.7	3.5	3.7	3.6	3.1
27 Apr	Ixè	27.1	30.9	11.0	15.1	5.8	3.6	3.4	3.1	3.8
26–27 Apr	Ipsos	28.9	31.1	13.1	13.1	3.2	3.9	4.2	2.5	2.2
25 Apr	Euromedia	25.7	31.0	12.8	13.5	4.0	4.8	3.0	5.2	5.3
23–24 Apr	EMG	27.6	30.5	11.9	14.9	4.5	4.4	2.8	3.4	2.9
20–21 Apr	ScenariPolitici	25.3	31.2	11.2	13.0	6.2	5.5	3.0	4.6	5.9
20–21 Apr	SWG	26.4	32.0	12.3	15.2	3.4	3.8	3.5	3.4	5.6
20 Apr	Ixè	26.3	31.8	10.4	14.4	6.4	3.9	3.3	3.5	5.5
20 Apr	IPR	27.0	30.0	10.0	14.5	3.5	5.0	3.0	7.0	3.0
18–19 Apr	Tecnè	27.5	30.5	12.5	13.5	4.5	5.5	3.0	3.0	3.0
18 Apr	Euromedia	26.5	30.0	13.0	13.8	3.8	5.2	3.0	4.7	3.5
16–17 Apr	EMG	27.3	30.6	12.2	14.7	4.6	4.4	3.2	3.0	3.3
14 Apr	Ixè	25.4	33.1	9.9	13.8	6.1	4.0	2.9	6.4	7.7
13–14 Apr	SWG	25.2	32.6	13.0	14.9	3.4	3.6	3.7	3.6	7.4
11 Apr	Euromedia	26.3	30.3	13.5	13.9	3.9	5.5	3.0	4.1	4.0
9–10 Apr	EMG	27.3	30.9	12.2	14.4	4.5	4.4	3.4	2.9	3.6
4–8 Apr	Demos&Pi	27.3	30.1	12.0	13.5	5.5	5.4	3.3	2.9	2.8
7 Apr	Ixè	25.8	33.5	10.4	14.0	5.3	3.9	2.7	4.4	7.7
7 Apr	IPR	26.5	30.0	10.0	14.5	4.0	5.5	3.0	6.5	3.5
6–7 Apr	SWG	24.3	33.2	12.4	14.6	3.7	4.0	3.5	4.3	8.9
4 Apr	Euromedia	25.5	30.7	13.5	14.0	4.0	4.7	2.8	4.8	5.2
2–3 Apr	EMG	27.4	32.1	12.6	13.8	4.3	4.4	3.4	2.9	4.7
30–31 Mar	SWG	22.8	33.4	12.8	14.8	4.1	4.3	3.8	4.4	10.6
30 Mar	Ixè	25.4	34.1	10.0	14.4	5.0	3.7	2.5	4.9	8.7
29 Mar	Euromedia	25.0	32.5	13.1	14.2	3.3	4.7	2.7	4.5	7.5
29 Mar	Tecnè	28.0	31.0	12.5	14.5	4.5	4.5	3.0	3.0	3.0
28 Mar	Piepoli	26.0	32.0	12.0	14.0	3.0	4.5	2.5	6.0	6.0
26–27 Mar	EMG	27.9	31.4	12.8	13.3	4.3	4.4	3.0	2.9	3.5
22–25 Mar	ScenariPolitici	23.6	32.7	10.2	12.5	5.9	5.8	3.5	5.8	9.1
23–24 Mar	SWG	23.0	34.0	12.8	14.7	4.0	3.9	3.3	4.3	11.0
23 Mar	Ixè	25.0	34.6	10.2	14.1	5.1	3.5	2.9	4.6	9.6
21 Mar	Piepoli	26.0	32.5	12.0	13.5	3.0	4.5	2.0	6.5	6.5
19–20 Mar	EMG	27.2	31.6	12.7	13.8	4.4	4.5	2.8	3.0	4.4
16–18 Mar	ScenariPolitici	23.6	32.4	9.8	12.9	6.2	5.5	3.4	6.2	8.8
16–17 Mar	SWG	22.4	33.6	12.8	15.4	4.1	3.6	3.4	4.7	11.2
16 Mar	Ixè	24.8	34.5	10.5	14.3	5.0	3.6	3.1	4.2	9.7
16 Mar	IPR	25.0	31.0	11.0	15.0	3.0	5.0	3.0	7.0	6.0
15 Mar	Euromedia	25.1	32.1	13.0	14.7	3.2	4.7	2.6	4.6	7.0
14–15 Mar	Tecnè	26.0	32.0	13.0	13.5	4.0	5.0	3.0	3.5	6.0
14 Mar	Piepoli	26.0	33.0	12.0	13.0	3.0	4.0	2.0	7.0	7.0
12–13 Mar	EMG	26.4	31.7	12.6	14.6	4.0	4.4	3.1	3.2	5.3
12 Mar	Ipsos	26.9	32.2	13.0	13.2	3.2	4.2	3.9	3.4	5.3
9–10 Mar	SWG	23.0	34.8	12.0	14.7	3.5	3.8	3.3	4.9	11.8
8–10 Mar	ScenariPolitici	25.4	32.2	9.1	13.5	5.6	4.6	3.3	6.4	6.8
9 Mar	Ixè	24.5	34.3	10.6	14.7	5.3	3.3	3.0	4.3	9.7
8–9 Mar	Demopolis	26.0	32.2	10.2	14.8	4.2	4.5	3.8	4.3	6.2
7 Mar	Piepoli	25.0	32.0	11.0	14.0	4.0	5.0	2.0	7.0	7.0
8 Mar	Euromedia	24.9	32.5	12.5	15.2	3.4	4.5	2.5	4.5	7.6
5–6 Mar	EMG	26.6	31.2	12.5	14.9	4.0	4.8	3.0	3.0	4.6
1–3 Mar	ScenariPolitici	24.5	31.7	9.7	12.1	5.4	5.9	1.8	8.7	7.2
2 Mar	Ixè	24.1	33.8	11.2	14.2	4.5	3.6	2.7	6.6	9.7
1–2 Mar	SWG	22.1	35.5	12.4	13.7	3.6	4.0	3.4	5.3	13.4
1 Mar	Euromedia	25.0	32.0	12.5	15.5	3.0	5.0	2.6	4.4	7.0
27–28 Feb	EMG	26.4	31.3	12.5	14.8	4.1	5.1	3.2	2.6	4.9
24–25 Feb	SWG	21.2	34.1	13.5	14.4	3.7	4.5	3.1	5.5	12.9
23–25 Feb	ScenariPolitici	21.6	33.1	9.3	14.0	5.0	4.6	3.1	9.2	11.5
23–25 Feb	Demos&Pi	25.8	32.2	13.3	13.2	5.5	4.7	2.1	3.2	6.4
24 Feb	Ixè	24.5	33.4	11.5	14.5	4.7	4.0	2.3	4.8	8.9
22 Feb	Euromedia	25.3	31.8	11.7	16.0	3.4	5.3	2.5	4.0	6.5
20–21 Feb	EMG	25.4	32.2	12.5	14.4	3.7	5.3	3.7	2.8	6.8
18 Feb	Tecnè	28.0	31.0	12.5	14.5	3.5	5.5	2.5	2.5	3.0
17–18 Feb	SWG	23.2	34.4	12.2	13.9	3.7	4.3	3.4	4.9	11.2
16–18 Feb	ScenariPolitici	24.7	32.8	9.5	14.1	4.6	5.1	2.5	6.8	8.1
17 Feb	Ixè	24.4	33.9	11.8	13.8	5.1	4.2	1.9	4.9	9.5
17 Feb	Lorien	25.8	33.8	10.9	15.2	3.2	3.4	3.2	3.0	8.0
9–16 Feb	ScenariPolitici	23.7	33.2	9.6	13.5	4.8	5.7	2.6	7.0	9.5
15 Feb	Piepoli	26.5	33.0	11.0	14.5	3.5	4.5	2.0	5.0	6.5
15 Feb	Euromedia	24.5	32.0	12.0	16.3	3.8	5.2	2.4	3.8	7.5
13–14 Feb	EMG	25.8	32.8	12.0	14.3	4.0	5.2	3.5	2.4	7.0
10–11 Feb	SWG	23.2	34.7	12.0	14.6	4.0	3.8	3.5	4.2	11.5
10 Feb	Ixè	24.9	33.3	11.7	14.0	4.8	4.4	2.1	4.8	8.4
8 Feb	Piepoli	27.0	33.0	10.5	14.5	3.5	4.5	2.0	5.5	6.0
8 Feb	Euromedia	24.7	31.5	11.9	16.2	4.0	5.4	2.4	3.9	6.8
6–7 Feb	EMG	26.3	32.3	11.7	15.2	3.7	5.2	3.1	2.5	6.0
3–4 Feb	SWG	22.4	35.2	12.2	14.4	3.8	4.0	3.9	4.1	12.8
2–4 Feb	ScenariPolitici	23.3	32.0	9.8	15.2	4.5	5.7	2.9	6.6	8.7
3 Feb	Ixè	24.7	34.1	11.2	14.2	4.2	4.0	2.7	2.5	9.4
1–2 Feb	Demopolis	27.0	32.0	10.0	15.5	4.5	4.6	3.4	3.0	5.0
1 Feb	Piepoli	27.0	32.5	10.5	15.0	3.5	4.0	2.0	5.5	5.5
1 Feb	Euromedia	25.3	30.8	11.4	16.0	4.0	5.5	2.3	4.7	5.5
30–31 Jan	EMG	26.5	31.8	11.6	15.8	3.2	5.6	2.7	2.8	5.3
27–28 Jan	SWG	22.6	34.8	12.0	15.0	3.5	4.2	3.7	4.2	12.2
26–28 Jan	ScenariPolitici	25.0	31.6	9.3	16.3	4.9	5.8	2.8	4.3	6.6
27 Jan	Ixè	25.3	33.9	11.0	14.6	4.0	4.2	3.3	3.7	8.6
26 Jan	Piepoli	27.5	32.0	10.0	15.5	3.5	4.0	2.0	5.5	4.5
25 Jan	Euromedia	25.7	30.4	11.5	15.8	3.8	5.4	2.2	5.2	4.7
23–24 Jan	EMG	26.8	31.4	11.8	15.3	3.6	5.5	2.3	3.3	4.6
20–21 Jan	SWG	23.1	33.8	12.1	14.7	3.9	3.8	3.3	5.3	10.7
20 Jan	Ixè	25.2	33.5	11.2	14.1	4.3	4.0	3.6	4.1	8.3
19 Jan	Lorien	27.0	33.0	9.5	16.0	3.5	3.5	2.9	4.6	6.0
18 Jan	Euromedia	26.3	30.5	11.2	15.5	4.0	5.3	1.8	5.4	4.2
16–17 Jan	EMG	27.0	31.3	11.6	15.4	3.8	5.3	2.5	3.1	4.3
15 Jan	IPR	27.0	30.5	10.0	15.5	4.0	5.0	3.0	5.2	3.5
13–14 Jan	SWG	24.0	34.0	11.1	15.5	4.1	3.9	3.0	4.4	10.0
13 Jan	Ixè	26.0	33.1	10.7	13.5	4.8	4.3	3.7	2.5	7.1
11 Jan	Piepoli	28.0	32.0	9.5	15.5	4.0	3.5	2.0	5.5	4.0
11 Jan	Euromedia	26.7	30.0	11.1	15.8	3.6	5.2	2.0	5.6	3.3
9–10 Jan	EMG	27.8	30.8	11.4	16.0	3.4	5.2	2.4	3.2	3.0
6 Jan	Ixè	26.0	33.4	11.1	13.7	4.3	4.4	3.4	3.7	7.4
4 Jan	Tecnè	29.0	31.0	12.0	15.5	3.0	5.0	2.5	2.0	2.0
4 Jan	IPR	29.0	30.0	10.0	14.5	4.0	5.0	3.0	4.5	1.0

=== 2015 ===
Date	Polling firm	M5S	PD	FI	SC	LN	SEL/ SI	FdI	UdC	NCD	Others	Lead
21 Dec	Piepoli	28.5	32.0	9.5		15.0	4.0	3.5	w.NCD	2.0	5.5	3.5
21 Dec	Euromedia	27.5	30.2	11.9		16.1	3.2	4.9	w.NCD	1.6	4.6	2.7
19–20 Dec	EMG	28.1	30.8	11.6		15.9	3.3	4.9	w.NCD	2.5	2.9	2.7
16 Dec	Ixè	26.1	33.7	10.9		13.9	4.4	4.5	w.NCD	3.1	3.4	7.6
16 Dec	Ipsos	29.1	31.2	10.8		14.3	3.4	4.3	w.NCD	3.9	3.0	2.1
15–16 Dec	SWG	25.1	32.9	13.0		15.0	4.0	3.7	w.NCD	3.2	3.1	7.8
15 Dec	Demopolis	28.0	31.0	10.4		15.8	4.5	4.3	w.NCD	3.5	2.5	3.0
14 Dec	Piepoli	28.5	32.0	9.5		14.5	4.5	3.5	w.NCD	2.0	5.5	3.5
14 Dec	Lorien	28.0	32.3	9.0	0.2	16.0	4.0	3.5	w.NCD	2.8	4.2	4.3
14 Dec	Euromedia	27.2	30.5	12.0		16.0	3.8	4.8	w.NCD	1.6	4.1	3.3
12–13 Dec	EMG	27.7	30.2	11.9		16.1	3.6	4.7	w.NCD	2.6	3.2	2.5
9 Dec	Ixè	26.5	33.1	11.4		14.0	4.3	4.2	w.NCD	3.0	3.5	6.6
8–9 Dec	SWG	24.0	33.5	12.0		15.4	4.4	4.1	w.NCD	3.4	3.2	9.5
7 Dec	Euromedia	26.4	32.0	12.1		15.5	3.5	4.6	w.NCD	1.4	4.5	5.6
5–6 Dec	EMG	27.8	30.0	11.9		16.4	3.6	4.7	w.NCD	2.4	3.2	2.2
2 Dec	Ixè	26.9	33.3	10.8	0.4	14.5	5.0	3.6	w.NCD	2.6	1.5	6.4
1–2 Dec	SWG	25.2	33.8	11.3		15.2	4.1	3.4	w.NCD	3.6	3.4	8.6
30 Nov	Piepoli	28.0	32.0	9.5		14.5	5.0	3.5	w.NCD	2.0	5.5	4.0
30 Nov	Euromedia	27.0	31.6	12.4		15.0	3.7	4.5	w.NCD	1.7	4.1	4.6
29 Nov	CISE	30.0	35.6	13.0		12.7	2.9	3.0	w.NCD	1.1	0.9	5.6
28–29 Nov	EMG	27.9	30.3	12.0		15.9	3.5	4.8	w.NCD	2.5	3.1	2.4
25 Nov	Ixè	26.6	34.0	10.3	0.5	14.7	4.5	3.3	w.NCD	2.5	2.0	7.4
23–25 Nov	SWG	23.8	33.6	12.4		16.0	4.1	4.0	w.NCD	3.3	2.8	9.8
23–24 Nov	Datamedia	27.0	32.3	11.0		14.2	3.3	4.3	w.NCD	2.7	5.2	5.3
23 Nov	Piepoli	27.5	32.0	9.5		14.5	5.0	4.0	w.NCD	2.0	5.5	4.5
23 Nov	Euromedia	26.6	31.5	12.5		15.1	4.0	4.6	w.NCD	1.8	3.9	4.9
21–22 Nov	EMG	27.6	30.5	12.1		15.3	3.5	4.9	w.NCD	2.9	3.2	2.9
21 Nov	Ipsos	28.6	32.4	11.6		13.7	3.9	4.3	w.NCD	3.3	2.2	3.8
18–20 Nov	Demos&Pi	27.4	31.6	12.8		14.1	5.5	4.0	w.NCD	3.0	1.6	4.2
18 Nov	Ixè	27.3	33.9	9.9		14.1	4.2	3.9	w.NCD	2.8	4.7	6.6
18 Nov	Euromedia	27.2	31.3	12.6		14.7	3.7	4.5	w.NCD	2.2	3.8	4.1
16–18 Nov	SWG	25.1	32.9	10.8		16.4	4.7	3.9	w.NCD	3.0	3.2	7.8
17 Nov	Demopolis	27.5	32.0	10.5		15.2	4.2	4.3	w.NCD	3.8	2.5	4.5
16 Nov	Piepoli	27.0	32.0	9.5		14.5	5.0	4.0	w.NCD	2.0	6.0	5.0
14–15 Nov	EMG	27.6	30.8	12.0		15.1	3.5	4.9	w.NCD	2.8	3.3	3.2
12 Nov	Ipsos	28.5	32.9	11.7		13.5	4.1	4.4	w.NCD	3.3	1.6	4.4
11 Nov	Ixè	28.1	34.0	9.1		14.3	3.8	3.0	w.NCD	2.5	5.2	3.9
11 Nov	IPR	28.0	30.0	12.5		14.0	5.0	4.5	w.NCD	3.0	3.5	2.0
9–11 Nov	SWG	26.4	33.2	10.3		15.8	4.5	3.3	w.NCD	2.8	3.7	6.8
9 Nov	Euromedia	26.5	31.5	12.5		14.5	4.0	4.8	w.NCD	2.3	3.9	5.0
9 Nov	Piepoli	27.5	32.0	9.0		14.0	5.5	4.0	w.NCD	2.0	6.0	4.5
9 Nov	IPR	28.0	31.0	12.5		14.0	5.0	4.0	w.NCD	3.0	3.0	3.0
9 Nov	Tecnè	28.5	30.5	12.5		15.0	4.5	4.5	w.NCD	3.0	1.5	2.0
7–8 Nov	EMG	27.5	31.6	11.8		14.4	3.4	4.8	w.NCD	2.8	3.5	4.5
4 Nov	Ixè	27.5	33.8	9.8	0.4	14.1	3.9	3.0	w.NCD	2.9	4.7	6.3
2–4 Nov	SWG	25.5	34.3	10.8		15.6	2.1	4.0	w.NCD	2.9	4.8	8.8
2–3 Nov	Datamedia	26.8	32.5	10.8		14.1	3.2	4.3	w.NCD	2.6	5.7	5.7
2 Nov	Euromedia	27.0	31.2	12.2		14.3	3.0	4.6	w.NCD	2.2	5.5	4.2
2 Nov	Piepoli	27.5	32.5	9.5		13.0	3.5	4.5	w.NCD	2.5	7.0	5.0
31 Oct–1 Nov	EMG	27.3	32.2	11.7		14.1	3.3	5.0	w.NCD	3.1	3.3	4.9
28 Oct	Ixè	26.4	34.0	9.6	0.2	14.8	4.1	3.1	w.NCD	3.5	4.3	7.6
26–28 Oct	SWG	26.8	34.7	11.2		15.0	1.8	3.2	w.NCD	3.1	4.2	7.9
26–27 Oct	Datamedia	26.5	32.9	10.8		14.4	3.1	4.1	w.NCD	2.6	5.6	6.4
26 Oct	Euromedia	27.2	31.4	11.7		14.5	3.0	4.5	w.NCD	2.0	5.7	4.2
26 Oct	Piepoli	27.5	33.0	9.5		13.0	3.5	4.0	w.NCD	2.5	7.0	5.5
24–25 Oct	EMG	27.1	32.5	11.6		14.3	3.2	4.9	w.NCD	2.8	3.6	5.4
21 Oct	Ixè	26.5	34.4	9.5	0.2	14.7	3.9	2.8	w.NCD	3.9	4.1	7.9
19–21 Oct	SWG	26.1	34.4	10.2		15.8	2.0	4.0	w.NCD	3.1	4.4	8.3
19–20 Oct	Datamedia	26.3	32.6	11.2		14.1	3.4	4.0	w.NCD	2.7	5.7	6.3
19 Oct	Euromedia	27.0	31.1	12.1		14.1	3.3	4.4	w.NCD	2.3	5.7	4.1
19 Oct	Piepoli	27.0	33.5	9.5		13.0	3.5	4.0	w.NCD	2.5	7.0	6.5
17–18 Oct	EMG	27.2	32.8	11.6		14.9	3.0	4.5	w.NCD	2.2	3.8	5.6
13–15 Oct	Demos&Pi	25.3	31.8	13.2		12.5	4.2	4.5	w.NCD	3.1	3.5	6.5
14 Oct	Ixè	26.0	33.9	9.7	0.3	14.3	4.1	2.8	w.NCD	3.4	4.5	7.9
12–14 Oct	SWG	25.3	34.7	11.3		15.5	2.0	3.7	w.NCD	3.4	3.7	9.4
12–13 Oct	Datamedia	25.9	32.8	11.0		14.6	3.4	3.9	w.NCD	2.6	5.8	6.9
12 Oct	IPR	28.0	32.0	11.0	0.3	14.0	3.0	5.0	w.NCD	3.5	3.2	5.0
12 Oct	Euromedia	26.6	31.5	11.8		14.7	3.5	4.3	w.NCD	3.0	5.6	4.9
12 Oct	Piepoli	26.5	33.5	9.5		13.5	3.5	4.0	w.NCD	2.5	7.0	7.0
11 Oct	Tecnè	27.5	33.0	11.5	0.5	15.0	4.0	4.0	w.NCD	4.0	1.5	5.5
10–11 Oct	EMG	26.6	32.9	12.1		15.2	3.3	4.3	w.NCD	2.1	3.5	6.3
7 Oct	Ixè	24.9	35.1	9.7	0.3	14.0	4.4	3.2	0.3	2.9	5.2	10.2
5–7 Oct	SWG	25.3	35.4	12.0		15.3	2.1	3.6	w.NCD	3.0	3.3	10.1
5–6 Oct	Datamedia	25.7	32.6	11.2		14.8	3.6	3.8	w.NCD	2.6	5.4	6.9
5 Oct	Euromedia	26.1	32.6	12.0		14.8	3.8	4.0	w.NCD	2.8	3.9	6.5
5 Oct	Piepoli	26.5	33.5	9.5		13.5	4.0	4.0	w.NCD	2.5	6.5	7.0
3–4 Oct	EMG	26.2	32.7	12.4		15.0	3.7	4.5	w.NCD	2.4	3.1	6.5
30 Sep	Ixè	25.1	35.0	9.6	0.3	14.3	4.6	3.3	0.3	2.5	5.0	9.9
28–30 Sep	SWG	25.5	36.0	11.7		15.5	2.0	3.2	w.NCD	2.8	3.3	10.5
28–29 Sep	Datamedia	25.2	32.7	11.5		14.9	3.8	3.8	w.NCD	2.5	5.6	7.5
28 Sep	Euromedia	26.0	32.0	12.5		15.0	4.0	3.6	w.NCD	2.5	4.3	6.0
28 Sep	Piepoli	26.0	33.5	9.5		14.0	4.0	4.0	w.NCD	2.5	6.5	7.5
26–27 Sep	Lorien	25.0	33.7	11.2	03	14.9	3.2	3.8	w.NCD	2.9	5.1	8.7
26–27 Sep	EMG	26.5	32.4	12.5		15.2	3.5	4.5	w.NCD	2.5	2.9	5.9
23 Sep	Ixè	24.2	34.7	10.3	0.2	14.6	4.8	3.4	0.4	2.2	5.1	10.5
21–23 Sep	SWG	24.9	35.8	11.6		15.0	2.3	3.2	w.NCD	3.0	4.2	10.9
21–22 Sep	Datamedia	24.8	32.9	11.6		15.0	3.9	3.8	w.NCD	2.6	5.4	8.1
21 Sep	Euromedia	25.8	31.6	12.3		15.4	3.5	4.0	w.NCD	2.0	5.4	5.8
21 Sep	Piepoli	26.0	33.5	10.0		14.0	4.0	4.0	w.NCD	2.5	6.0	7.5
19–20 Sep	EMG	26.7	32.1	12.2		15.5	3.4	4.4	w.NCD	2.7	3.0	5.4
16 Sep	Ixè	23.1	34.2	10.8	0.3	14.9	4.9	3.8	0.4	2.3	5.3	11.1
16 Sep	Ipsos	27.0	33.1	12.8		13.7	2.5	3.5	w.NCD	3.7	2.7	6.1
14–16 Sep	SWG	25.5	34.3	11.8		16.1	2.4	3.1	w.NCD	3.6	4.2	8.8
14–15 Sep	Datamedia	24.3	32.8	11.4		15.4	3.8	3.9	w.NCD	2.6	5.8	8.5
14 Sep	Euromedia	25.1	31.5	12.0		15.7	3.8	4.0	w.NCD	1.8	6.2	6.4
14 Sep	IPR	26.0	31.5	11.0	0.3	14.0	3.5	4.0	w.NCD	3.5	6.2	5.5
12–13 Sep	EMG	26.4	32.2	12.0		15.2	3.6	4.6	w.NCD	3.0	3.0	5.8
12 Sep	Tecnè	27.0	32.0	12.0		15.5	4.0	4.0	w.NCD	3.5	1.5	5.0
12 Sep	Piepoli	26.0	33.0	10.0		14.5	4.0	4.0	w.NCD	2.5	6.0	7.5
10 Sep	Demopolis	25.8	33.2	10.6		16.4	4.5	4.0	w.NCD	4.0	1.5	7.4
8–10 Sep	Demos&Pi	26.7	33.1	11.4		14.0	4.5	3.5	w.NCD	2.7	4.1	6.4
9 Sep	Ixè	22.5	34.0	10.4	0.4	15.1	4.6	4.0	0.5	2.9	5.6	11.5
7–9 Sep	SWG	24.0	34.6	12.7		15.1	2.3	3.6	w.NCD	3.5	4.2	10.6
7–8 Sep	Datamedia	23.8	32.8	11.3		15.7	3.7	3.8	w.NCD	2.5	6.4	9.0
7 Sep	Euromedia	25.0	31.2	12.3		16.4	3.2	4.1	w.NCD	1.8	6.0	6.2
7 Sep	Piepoli	25.5	33.0	10.0		15.0	4.0	4.0	w.NCD	2.5	6.0	7.5
5–6 Sep	EMG	25.9	32.5	11.6		15.1	3.8	4.6	w.NCD	3.6	2.9	6.6
2 Sep	Ixè	22.6	33.4	10.2	0.4	15.4	4.6	3.9	0.5	3.1	5.9	10.8
2 Sep	Lorien	24.7	33.1	11.2	0.2	15.6	2.8	4.3	w.NCD	2.3	5.1	8.4
31 Aug–2 Sep	SWG	23.7	34.1	12.6		16.2	2.4	3.2	w.NCD	3.1	4.7	10.4
31 Aug	Piepoli	25.5	32.5	10.0		15.5	4.0	4.0	w.NCD	2.5	6.0	7.0
28 Aug	Euromedia	25.1	30.6	11.9		16.5	3.1	3.1	w.NCD	2.5	7.2	5.5
26 Aug	Ixè	22.5	33.1	9.9	0.3	15.8	4.4	3.8	0.7	3.4	6.1	10.6
5 Aug	Ixè	22.7	33.6	10.0	0.3	15.7	4.4	3.6	0.8	3.2	5.7	10.9
3 Aug	Piepoli	25.5	34.0	10.0		15.5	3.5	4.0	w.NCD	2.5	5.0	8.5
29 Jul–1 Aug	ScenariPolitici	26.1	29.0	10.9		16.1	2.7	4.2	w.NCD	2.9	8.1	2.9
29 Jul	Ixè	23.0	33.9	10.1	0.3	15.9	4.1	3.5	1.0	3.0	5.2	10.9
27–29 Jul	SWG	25.5	34.3	12.0		15.1	1.8	3.9	w.NCD	3.0	4.5	8.8
27–28 Jul	Datamedia	23.3	33.5	11.5		15.6	3.6	3.8	w.NCD	2.6	6.1	10.2
27 Jul	IPR	24.0	32.0	10.0	0.3	14.5	4.0	5.0	w.NCD	3.5	6.7	8.0
27 Jul	Piepoli	25.0	34.0	10.0		15.5	3.5	4.0	w.NCD	2.5	5.5	9.0
23 Jul	Lorien	24.8	33.2	11.9	0.3	15.5	2.2	4.1	w.NCD	3.0	5.0	8.4
22 Jul	Ixè	22.8	33.8	10.0	0.3	15.7	4.0	3.4	1.3	2.8	5.9	11.0
20–22 Jul	SWG	26.0	33.2	12.2		15.8	1.9	3.3	w.NCD	3.3	4.3	7.2
20–21 Jul	Datamedia	23.3	33.6	11.8		15.5	3.8	4.0	w.NCD	2.6	5.4	10.3
20 Jul	Piepoli	24.5	33.5	10.5		16.0	3.5	4.0	w.NCD	2.5	5.5	9.0
18–19 Jul	EMG	25.4	31.9	11.6		15.8	3.8	4.4	w.NCD	4.0	3.1	6.5
17 Jul	Euromedia	24.4	32.3	12.7		15.6	3.3	4.3	w.NCD	2.5	4.9	7.9
15 Jul	Ixè	23.0	33.7	10.2	0.3	15.3	3.8	3.5	1.0	3.0	6.2	10.7
14–15 Jul	Demopolis	26.0	32.0	11.5		16.0	4.3	4.0	w.NCD	3.8	2.4	6.0
13–15 Jul	SWG	24.4	34.6	12.1		15.0	2.1	3.8	w.NCD	3.6	4.4	10.2
13–14 Jul	Datamedia	22.9	33.7	12.0		15.5	3.9	4.0	w.NCD	2.7	5.3	10.8
13 Jul	Lorien	24.8	33.2	12.3	0.2	15.5	2.4	4.3	w.NCD	3.2	4.1	8.4
13 Jul	Piepoli	24.5	32.5	11.0		16.5	3.5	4.0	w.NCD	2.5	5.5	8.0
8 Jul	Ixè	22.5	34.0	10.2	0.5	15.0	3.9	3.6	1.0	2.8	6.5	11.5
6–8 Jul	SWG	23.8	34.0	12.8		15.5	2.2	3.9	w.NCD	3.0	4.8	10.2
6–7 Jul	Demopolis	26.0	31.0	12.0		16.2	4.6	4.0	w.NCD	3.7	2.5	5.0
6–7 Jul	Datamedia	22.6	33.9	12.2		15.4	3.9	4.1	w.NCD	2.6	5.3	11.3
6 Jul	Euromedia	23.4	32.1	13.2		15.1	3.7	4.2	w.NCD	2.7	5.6	8.7
6 Jul	Piepoli	24.0	33.5	11.0		16.5	3.5	4.0	w.NCD	2.5	5.0	9.5
1 Jul	Ixè	22.6	33.7	10.1	0.6	15.3	4.3	3.9	1.1	2.5	5.9	11.1
29 Jun–1 Jul	SWG	23.9	33.3	13.9		16.0	2.4	3.4	w.NCD	3.4	3.7	9.4
29–30 Jun	Datamedia	22.4	34.2	12.3		15.3	3.8	4.1	w.NCD	2.7	5.2	11.8
29 Jun	Tecnè	25.0	32.5	12.5		15.5	3.0	4.0	w.NCD	3.5	4.0	7.5
29 Jun	Euromedia	23.0	32.5	13.4		15.0	3.5	4.1	w.NCD	2.8	5.7	9.5
29 Jun	Piepoli	23.5	34.0	11.0		16.5	3.5	4.0	w.NCD	2.5	5.0	10.5
26–28 Jun	IPR	23.0	33.5	11.0	0.2	14.0	3.5	5.0	w.NCD	3.5	6.3	10.5
25–26 Jun	Demopolis	25.0	32.0	12.0		16.0	4.5	4.0	w.NCD	3.8	2.7	7.0
24 Jun	Ixè	22.1	33.9	9.8	0.8	15.6	4.4	4.1	1.3	2.8	5.2	11.8
22–24 Jun	SWG	23.2	33.0	13.8		16.3	2.1	4.0	w.NCD	3.6	4.0	9.8
23 Jun	Lorien	24.8	33.9	11.5	0.1	15.2	3.1	4.2	w.NCD	3.5	3.7	9.1
22–23 Jun	Datamedia	22.3	34.3	12.5		15.2	3.8	4.1	w.NCD	2.7	5.1	12.0
22 Jun	Euromedia	22.5	33.0	13.7		14.7	3.8	4.1	w.NCD	2.7	5.5	10.5
22 Jun	Piepoli	23.0	34.5	11.0		16.5	3.5	4.0	w.NCD	2.5	5.0	11.5
16–18 Jun	Demos&Pi	26.1	32.2	14.2		14.0	5.2	3.3	w.NCD	3.5	1.5	6.1
17 Jun	Ixè	21.7	33.8	9.9	0.6	15.9	4.2	4.2	1.4	2.7	5.6	12.1
16–17 Jun	Ipsos	27.5	31.5	12.4		14.7	4.4	4.2	w.NCD	4.3	1.0	4.0
15–17 Jun	SWG	22.5	34.0	14.1		16.0	2.0	4.2	w.NCD	3.5	3.7	11.5
16 Jun	Lorien	23.8	34.9	11.4	0.1	14.8	3.1	4.2	w.NCD	3.5	4.2	11.1
15–16 Jun	Datamedia	21.8	34.7	12.2		15.3	3.9	4.2	w.NCD	2.5	5.4	12.9
15 Jun	Euromedia	21.5	34.0	13.2		14.9	3.9	4.1	w.NCD	2.8	5.6	12.5
15 Jun	Piepoli	22.0	35.5	11.0		16.5	3.5	4.0	w.NCD	2.5	5.0	13.5
13–14 Jun	IPR	22.0	34.0	12.0	0.2	14.0	3.5	4.5	w.NCD	3.5	6.3	12.0
12 Jun	Tecnè	24.0	33.0	12.5		15.0	3.0	4.5	w.NCD	4.0	4.0	9.0
8–10 Jun	SWG	20.8	34.1	13.7		16.9	2.7	4.1	w.NCD	3.6	4.1	13.3
10 Jun	Ixè	20.8	35.6	10.0	0.5	15.1	4.6	4.4	1.9	2.3	4.8	14.8
8–9 Jun	Datamedia	21.9	34.5	12.3		15.3	3.9	4.2	w.NCD	2.5	5.4	12.6
8 Jun	Ipsos	25.0	32.3	12.0		14.8	3.1	4.6	w.NCD	4.0	4.2	7.3
8 Jun	Euromedia	21.2	34.5	13.2		14.6	4.1	4.4	w.NCD	2.8	5.2	13.3
8 Jun	Piepoli	22.0	36.0	10.5		16.5	3.5	4.0	w.NCD	2.5	5.0	14.0
8 Jun	Lorien	23.3	35.6	11.4	0.1	14.5	3.5	3.8	w.NCD	3.1	4.7	12.3
3–4 Jun	SWG	20.7	35.0	13.9		16.1	3.4	4.0	w.NCD	3.0	3.9	14.3
3 Jun	Ixè	21.2	35.8	10.1	0.3	14.9	4.6	4.6	2.0	2.5	4.0	14.6
30–31 May	EMG	23.0	33.8	12.4		15.5	4.0	4.7	w.NCD	3.6	3.0	10.8
18 May	Piepoli	21.5	37.0	10.0		15.5	4.0	4.0	w.NCD	2.5	5.5	15.5
14 May	CISE	23.5	36.5	12.2		15.0	4.1	2.1	w.NCD	3.2	3.4	13.0
13 May	Ixè	19.9	36.2	11.3	0.4	13.8	4.5	3.9	1.4	2.5	2.4	16.3
11–13 May	SWG	18.2	37.5	13.9		13.9	3.7	3.9	w.NCD	3.1	5.8	19.3
11–12 May	Demopolis	21.0	35.0	10.2		15.0	4.5	4.0	w.NCD	3.8	6.5	14.0
11–12 May	Datamedia	21.0	35.8	12.2		14.8	4.0	3.9	w.NCD	2.5	5.8	14.8
11 May	Piepoli	21.0	37.5	10.0		15.5	4.0	4.0	w.NCD	3.0	5.0	16.5
9–10 May	EMG	22.8	34.2	12.5		14.9	4.0	4.7	w.NCD	3.6	3.3	11.4
8–10 May	IPR	23.0	35.5	12.5		13.0	3.5	3.5	w.NCD	2.5	6.5	12.5
7–9 May	Tecnè	22.5	35.0	13.0		14.0	4.0	3.5	w.NCD	3.5	4.5	12.5
6 May	Ixè	19.7	36.9	11.8	0.6	13.6	4.6	4.0	1.4	2.2	5.2	17.2
4–6 May	SWG	17.9	38.5	14.6		13.0	4.0	3.8	w.NCD	3.2	6.0	20.6
4–5 May	Datamedia	20.6	35.9	12.0		15.0	4.2	4.0	w.NCD	2.5	5.8	15.3
4 May	Lorien	19.8	37.1	12.2	0.1	13.7	4.3	3.5	w.NCD	3.7	5.6	17.3
4 May	Piepoli	20.5	38.0	10.0		15.5	4.0	4.0	w.NCD	3.0	5.0	17.5
2–3 May	EMG	23.1	34.8	11.8		14.8	4.1	4.8	w.NCD	3.3	3.3	11.7
2 May	IPR	20.5	35.5	11.0	0.3	13.5	4.5	4.5	w.NCD	3.0	7.2	15.0
27–29 Apr	SWG	19.0	37.7	14.2		13.5	4.2	3.6	w.NCD	3.2	4.6	18.7
28 Apr	Ixè	19.5	36.7	12.2	0.5	13.9	4.4	3.8	1.3	2.4	5.3	17.2
27–28 Apr	Datamedia	20.7	35.6	12.4		15.0	4.1	4.0	w.NCD	2.2	6.0	14.9
27 Apr	Euromedia	21.0	35.5	12.7		14.0	4.4	4.5	w.NCD	2.8	3.3	14.5
27 Apr	Piepoli	20.5	37.5	10.0		15.0	4.5	4.0	w.NCD	3.0	5.5	17.0
25–26 Apr	EMG	22.5	34.5	12.1		15.5	4.1	4.8	w.NCD	2.9	3.6	12.0
25–26 Apr	Lorien	19.5	37.5	12.5	0.1	13.8	4.3	3.2	w.NCD	3.9	5.2	18.0
20–24 Apr	ScenariPolitici	21.2	35.3	10.7		15.5	3.6	4.9	w.NCD	2.9	5.9	14.1
22 Apr	Ixè	19.8	36.5	12.6	0.3	13.6	4.7	3.9	1.2	2.5	4.9	16.7
20–22 Apr	SWG	18.5	38.1	15.5		13.0	3.8	3.3	w.NCD	3.9	3.9	19.6
20–21 Apr	Datamedia	20.4	35.9	12.4		14.9	3.9	3.9	w.NCD	2.4	6.2	15.5
20 Apr	Euromedia	20.8	35.6	12.7		13.8	4.0	4.5	w.NCD	2.7	5.9	14.8
20 Apr	Piepoli	20.0	38.0	10.0		15.0	4.5	4.0	w.NCD	3.0	5.5	18.0
18–19 Apr	EMG	21.1	35.2	12.2		16.0	4.2	4.9	w.NCD	2.6	3.8	14.1
18–19 Apr	Lorien	19.2	38.5	12.3	0.1	14.0	4.1	3.2	w.NCD	3.7	4.7	19.3
15 Apr	Ixè	20.0	36.9	12.9	0.1	13.3	4.5	3.7	1.0	2.7	4.9	16.9
15 Apr	IPR	19.5	37.0	11.0	0.3	13.0	4.0	4.0	w.NCD	3.5	7.7	17.5
14–15 Apr	Demopolis	20.0	36.0	11.0		14.5	4.1	4.0	w.NCD	3.5	6.9	16.0
13–15 Apr	SWG	17.4	38.5	14.5		13.4	3.3	3.0	w.NCD	3.5	6.4	21.1
13–14 Apr	Datamedia	20.5	36.2	12.6		14.8	3.8	3.8	w.NCD	2.3	6.0	15.7
13 Apr	Euromedia	20.0	36.0	13.1		13.5	4.2	4.8	w.NCD	2.9	5.5	14.0
13 Apr	Piepoli	20.0	38.5	10.0		14.5	4.5	4.0	w.NCD	3.0	5.0	18.5
11–12 Apr	EMG	21.3	35.3	12.1		15.5	4.1	5.0	w.NCD	2.9	3.8	14.0
11–12 Apr	Lorien	18.5	38.5	12.5	0.2	13.8	4.3	3.5	w.NCD	3.8	4.9	20.0
7–9 Apr	Demopolis	19.8	37.0	11.2		14.5	4.1	4.0	w.NCD	3.4	6.0	17.2
8 Apr	Ixè	19.0	37.6	13.1	0.1	13.5	4.7	3.9	0.9	2.8	4.4	18.6
7–8 Apr	Ipsos	22.0	35.0	13.4		14.0	3.6	3.8	2.0	2.8	3.4	13.0
6–8 Apr	SWG	17.8	39.8	14.8		12.0	3.0	3.1	w.NCD	3.8	5.7	22.0
7 Apr	Euromedia	20.3	36.6	13.3		13.7	4.0	4.6	w.NCD	2.8	4.7	16.3
7 Apr	Datamedia	19.8	36.9	12.6		14.8	4.2	3.3	w.NCD	2.2	6.2	17.1
7 Apr	Piepoli	19.5	38.0	10.5		14.5	5.0	4.0	w.NCD	3.0	5.5	18.5
5–6 Apr	EMG	20.7	36.8	11.3		15.2	4.1	5.1	w.NCD	2.8	4.0	16.1
30 Mar–4 Apr	ScenariPolitici	20.2	35.4	11.9		14.0	4.0	4.2	w.NCD	3.4	6.9	15.2
1–2 Apr	Ipsos	21.3	35.7	13.5	0.3	13.7	3.6	4.0	2.5	2.2	3.2	14.4
1 Apr	Tecnè	19.5	37.5	12.5		13.5	5.0	3.0	w.NCD	3.0	6.0	18.0
1 Apr	IPR	19.0	36.0	12.0	0.3	13.5	6.0	3.0	w.NCD	3.0	6.2	17.0
1 Apr	Ixè	18.7	38.4	12.9	0.1	13.5	4.3	3.9	1.0	2.5	4.6	19.7
30 Mar–1 Apr	SWG	17.0	39.4	14.6		12.6	3.2	2.9	w.NCD	4.2	6.1	22.4
30–31 Mar	Datamedia	19.8	37.1	12.6		14.6	4.0	3.2	w.NCD	2.4	6.3	17.3
30 Mar	Piepoli	19.0	38.0	10.5		14.5	5.0	4.0	w.NCD	3.0	6.0	19.0
30 Mar	Euromedia	20.0	37.0	13.0		13.5	4.0	4.5	w.NCD	2.7	5.4	17.0
28–29 Mar	EMG	20.3	37.2	11.0		15.4	4.1	5.0	w.NCD	2.9	4.1	16.9
24–26 Mar	Demos&Pi	20.4	36.6	13.5		11.5		4.8	w.NCD	3.6	9.6	16.2
25 Mar	Ixè	18.5	38.9	12.7	0.1	13.7	4.2	3.5	0.8	2.5	5.1	20.4
23–25 Mar	SWG	17.5	38.6	15.6		12.0	3.0	3.3	w.NCD	3.6	6.4	21.1
23–24 Mar	Datamedia	19.7	37.1	12.5		14.5	4.1	3.0	w.NCD	2.4	6.7	17.4
23 Mar	Euromedia	19.5	36.8	13.2		13.5	4.2	4.5	1.8	1.2	5.3	17.3
23 Mar	Piepoli	19.0	38.0	11.0		15.0	4.5	3.5	w.NCD	3.0	6.0	19.0
21–22 Mar	Lorien	17.5	38.0	13.0	0.2	14.0	4.0	2.8	w.NCD	4.0	6.5	20.5
21–22 Mar	EMG	20.3	37.0	11.4		15.3	4.1	4.8	w.NCD	3.0	4.1	16.7
18 Mar	Ixè	18.6	38.8	12.5	0.2	13.4	4.4	3.3	1.0	2.6	5.2	20.2
16–18 Mar	SWG	17.7	39.7	14.8		12.2	3.4	3.0	w.NCD	2.9	6.3	22.0
16–17 Mar	Datamedia	19.5	37.4	12.6		14.4	4.0	2.8	w.NCD	2.5	6.8	17.9
16 Mar	Euromedia	18.6	37.0	13.0		13.7	3.9	4.4	1.8	2.0	5.6	18.4
16 Mar	Piepoli	18.5	38.0	11.0		15.5	4.0	3.5	w.NCD	3.5	6.0	19.5
14–15 Mar	EMG	20.2	37.6	11.7		15.1	4.1	4.4	w.NCD	3.1	3.8	17.4
13 Mar	IPR	18.5	38.5	12.0	0.8	13.5	3.0	2.5	w.NCD	4.0	7.2	20.0
11 Mar	Ixè	19.3	38.5	12.6	0.4	13.5	4.2	3.1	0.9	2.7	4.8	19.2
9–11 Mar	SWG	16.5	39.2	16.0		13.0	3.2	2.2	w.NCD	3.8	6.1	22.7
9–10 Mar	Datamedia	19.2	37.2	12.5		14.5	4.0	2.7	w.NCD	3.2	6.7	18.0
9 Mar	Piepoli	17.5	38.0	11.0		16.0	4.0	3.5	w.NCD	4.0	6.0	20.5
7–8 Mar	Lorien	17.5	38.5	12.0	0.2	14.5	4.0	2.5	w.NCD	4.3	6.5	21.0
7–8 Mar	EMG	19.9	37.4	11.6		16.1	4.0	4.3	w.NCD	3.0	2.4	17.5
3–5 Mar	Demopolis	19.0	38.0	11.5		15.0	4.2	4.0	w.NCD	3.8	4.5	19.0
4 Mar	Ixè	18.5	38.3	12.9	0.4	14.2	3.9	3.3	0.7	2.9	4.9	19.8
2–4 Mar	SWG	17.0	39.8	14.7		13.6	2.9	2.3	w.NCD	3.4	6.3	22.8
2–3 Mar	Datamedia	19.4	37.0	12.4		14.2	4.2	2.5	w.NCD	3.3	7.0	17.6
2 Mar	Tecnè	19.0	38.0	13.0		14.0	4.0	2.5	w.NCD	3.5	6.0	19.0
2 Mar	Lorien	17.5	38.5	12.5	0.5	15.0	4.0	2.5	w.NCD	4.0	5.5	21.0
2 Mar	Euromedia	17.5	37.2	13.0		14.6	4.4	4.2	1.8	2.0	5.3	19.7
2 Mar	Piepoli	17.0	38.0	11.0		16.0	4.5	3.5	w.NCD	4.0	6.0	21.0
2 Mar	Ipsos	19.7	36.5	13.1		14.7	3.8	4.0	1.7	3.2	3.3	16.8
28 Feb	Lorien	17.5	39.0	12.5	0.5	15.0	4.0	2.5	w.NCD	4.0	4.5	21.5
27–28 Feb	EMG	19.6	37.1	12.0		15.9	4.0	4.1	w.NCD	3.1	2.8	17.5
23–28 Feb	ScenariPolitici	18.8	36.5	12.4		15.3	3.6	3.5	w.NCD	3.5	6.4	17.7
25 Feb	Ixè	18.3	38.5	12.6	0.3	14.2	3.7	2.9	0.7	2.7	6.1	20.2
23–25 Feb	SWG	16.1	40.2	16.1		12.0	3.5	2.4	w.NCD	3.9	5.8	24.1
23–24 Feb	Datamedia	19.3	37.0	13.2		14.0	4.2	2.5	w.NCD	3.3	6.5	17.7
23 Feb	Piepoli	16.5	39.0	11.0		16.0	4.0	3.5	w.NCD	4.5	5.5	22.5
21–22 Feb	EMG	20.1	37.2	12.4		15.1	4.1	3.8	w.NCD	3.0	4.3	17.1
19 Feb	IPR	18.5	38.5	13.5		14.5	4.0	2.0	w.NCD	3.5	5.5	20.0
18 Feb	Ixè	18.7	37.8	13.0	0.2	13.8	3.6	2.9	0.9	3.0	6.1	19.1
17–18 Feb	Tecnè	18.0	38.0	14.0		14.0	3.0	3.0	w.NCD	5.0	5.0	20.0
16–18 Feb	SWG	16.8	39.4	15.9		12.3	2.6	2.7	w.NCD	4.2	6.1	22.6
16–17 Feb	Datamedia	18.7	37.0	12.8		14.7	4.0	2.5	w.NCD	3.5	6.8	18.3
16 Feb	Piepoli	17.0	38.0	11.5		15.5	4.5	3.5	w.NCD	4.5	5.5	21.0
16 Feb	Ipsos	20.2	37.2	13.5		13.5	3.5	3.1	2.0	3.1	3.9	17.0
16 Feb	Euromedia	18.3	36.7	14.0		14.0	4.1	3.9	1.9	1.8	5.3	18.4
14–15 Feb	Lorien	18.0	38.0	13.5	0.5	14.5	4.0	3.0	w.NCD	4.0	4.5	20.0
14–15 Feb	EMG	19.8	37.1	12.0		15.5	4.1	3.8	w.NCD	3.2	4.5	17.3
11 Feb	Ixè	19.1	37.5	12.8	0.3	13.9	3.8	3.1	0.9	2.8	5.8	18.4
11 Feb	IPR	19.0	38.0	13.0		14.5	4.0	2.0	w.NCD	3.0	6.5	19.0
9–11 Feb	SWG	18.1	38.7	14.6	0.2	12.3	3.2	3.0	w.NCD	3.4	6.7	20.6
9–10 Feb	Datamedia	18.0	37.1	13.0		14.2	4.0	2.3	w.NCD	3.5	7.9	19.1
9 Feb	Lorien	17.5	38.0	14.0	0.5	14.0	4.0	3.0	w.NCD	4.0	5.0	20.5
9 Feb	Euromedia	18.6	36.6	14.2		13.9	4.5	4.0	2.0	1.8	4.4	18.0
9 Feb	Piepoli	17.5	37.0	11.5		16.0	4.5	3.5	w.NCD	4.5	5.5	19.5
7–8 Feb	EMG	19.2	37.2	12.4		15.2	4.4	3.6	w.NCD	3.7	4.3	18.0
4–6 Feb	Demos&Pi	19.8	37.7	14.3		11.3		3.6	w.NCD	5.1	8.2	17.9
4–5 Feb	Ixè	19.4	37.0	12.9	0.3	13.8	4.0	3.3	1.1	2.7	5.5	17.6
2–4 Feb	SWG	17.0	39.5	15.1	0.4	12.2	3.1	3.4	w.NCD	3.2	6.1	22.5
3 Feb	Euromedia	18.5	36.8	13.9		13.6	4.3	3.9	2.3	1.9	4.8	18.3
2–3 Feb	Datamedia	18.1	36.8	12.8		14.0	4.2	2.5	1.0	2.5	8.1	18.7
2 Feb	Piepoli	18.0	36.0	11.5		15.5	4.5	3.5	w.NCD	5.0	6.0	18.0
2 Feb	Tecnè	19.0	38.0	14.0		14.0	4.0	2.0	w.NCD	4.0	5.0	19.0
2 Feb	IPR	19.0	37.0	13.0		13.0	3.5	2.0	w.NCD	3.0	9.5	18.0
31 Jan–1 Feb	EMG	19.7	36.6	13.1		14.9	4.9	3.4	w.NCD	3.3	4.1	16.9
28–29 Jan	Ixè	19.2	36.8	13.3	0.2	13.6	4.2	3.0	1.1	2.6	6.0	17.6
27–28 Jan	Ipsos	20.0	36.0	14.0	1.0	13.8	4.0	3.5	1.8	3.0	2.9	16.0
26–28 Jan	SWG	17.8	37.8	16.1	0.4	12.1	3.1	3.1	w.NCD	3.8	5.8	20.0
27 Jan	Tecnè	21.0	35.0	15.0		14.0	5.0	2.0	w.NCD	4.0	4.0	14.0
26 Jan	Piepoli	18.0	35.0	12.5		15.5	4.5	3.5	w.NCD	5.0	6.0	17.0
26 Jan	Lorien	17.0	36.0	14.0	0.5	13.5	3.5	3.5	w.NCD	4.5	7.5	19.0
26 Jan	Euromedia	18.9	35.2	14.6		13.5	4.2	3.5	1.7	2.9	5.5	16.3
24–25 Jan	EMG	20.8	35.2	14.0		14.8	4.6	3.3	w.NCD	3.3	4.0	14.4
20–23 Jan	Demos&Pi	19.7	36.3	15.8		13.0		3.3	w.NCD	4.8	7.1	16.6
22 Jan	IPR	19.5	36.0	13.3	0.7	13.0	3.5	2.0	w.NCD	4.0	8.0	16.5
21–22 Jan	Ixè	19.0	36.9	13.4	0.2	13.5	3.9	3.1	1.0	2.7	6.3	17.9
20 Jan	Tecnè	20.0	35.0	15.0		13.0	4.0	3.0	w.NCD	4.0	6.0	15.0
19–20 Jan	SWG	19.0	38.0	15.0	0.3	11.5	2.8	3.2	w.NCD	4.3	5.9	19.0
19–20 Jan	Datamedia	18.5	35.7	13.0		13.7	4.0	2.4	1.0	3.3	8.4	17.2
19 Jan	Euromedia	18.7	36.0	14.5		13.0	3.7	3.1	2.0	3.0	6.0	17.3
19 Jan	Ipsos	20.4	34.6	14.6		13.5	3.5	3.0	2.0	3.4	5.0	14.2
19 Jan	Piepoli	18.5	36.0	12.5		15.0	4.0	3.5	w.NCD	4.5	6.0	17.5
17–18 Jan	EMG	20.8	35.6	14.5		14.1	3.4	3.5	w.NCD	3.6	4.5	14.8
13–17 Jan	ScenariPolitici	19.0	37.0	14.0		14.0	3.3	3.0	w.NCD	3.5	6.2	18.0
14–15 Jan	Ixè	18.9	37.6	13.1	0.2	13.2	3.8	2.9	1.2	2.5	6.6	18.7
13–14 Jan	Ipsos	20.6	34.8	14.8	0.6	12.8	3.8	3.2	2.0	3.5	3.9	14.2
13–14 Jan	SWG	21.5	37.2	14.9	1.1	10.0	3.5	3.1	w.NCD	3.6	5.1	15.7
12 Jan	Piepoli	19.0	36.5	12.5		15.0	3.5	3.5	w.NCD	4.0	6.0	17.5
10–11 Jan	EMG	20.5	36.0	14.3		14.3	3.1	3.5	w.NCD	3.5	4.8	15.5
10–11 Jan	Ixè	18.7	37.2	13.3	0.2	13.0	3.7	2.6	1.3	2.3	7.7	18.5
7–8 Jan	Lorien	18.0	37.5	14.5	0.5	11.5	2.5	3.0	w.NCD	4.0	8.5	21.0
7–8 Jan	SWG	20.6	38.1	14.1	0.8	11.5	3.0	2.7	w.NCD	3.2	6.0	17.5
7 Jan	Tecnè	19.0	37.0	15.0		14.0	3.0	3.0	w.NCD	4.0	5.0	18.0

=== 2014 ===
Date	Polling firm	M5S	PD	FI	SC	LN	SEL	FdI	UdC	NCD	Others	Lead
22 Dec	Piepoli	19.5	36.5	13.0		14.0	3.5	3.0	w.NCD	3.5	7.0	17.0
20–21 Dec	EMG	20.2	36.4	14.7		14.1	3.0	3.4	w.NCD	3.6	4.6	16.2
15–19 Dec	Demos&Pi	19.2	37.0	13.6		13.3		3.7	w.NCD	4.5	8.7	17.8
17–18 Dec	Ixè	18.5	37.5	13.9	0.3	12.1	3.8	2.2	1.7	2.1	7.9	19.0
17 Dec	Datamedia	18.1	36.8	13.2		13.5	3.9	2.0	1.0	3.2	8.3	18.7
16–17 Dec	SWG	19.4	37.0	15.1	0.8	12.0	2.9	3.1	w.NCD	3.5	6.2	17.6
16 Dec	Tecnè	18.0	37.0	15.0		13.0	4.0	3.0	w.NCD	3.0	7.0	19.0
15 Dec	Piepoli	19.5	37.0	13.0		14.0	3.5	3.0	w.NCD	3.0	7.0	17.5
15 Dec	Euromedia	19.0	36.8	15.5		11.7	3.8	2.5	2.0	2.9	5.8	17.8
13–14 Dec	Lorien	17.5	38.5	14.0	1.0	10.0	2.5	3.0	w.NCD	4.5	9.0	21.0
13–14 Dec	EMG	20.0	36.1	14.1		14.4	3.5	3.2	w.NCD	3.7	5.0	16.1
10–11 Dec	Ixè	18.6	38.1	14.1	0.3	11.2	3.4	2.6	1.4	2.3	8.0	19.5
9–10 Dec	SWG	19.0	37.3	14.6	0.7	10.8	2.9	3.5	w.NCD	3.8	7.4	18.3
9 Dec	Ipsos	19.3	35.1	15.2		13.2	4.8	2.6	2.0	3.2	4.6	15.8
9 Dec	Datamedia	18.0	37.0	13.3		13.5	3.8	2.0	1.1	3.2	8.1	20.3
9 Dec	Piepoli	19.5	38.0	12.5		13.5	3.5	3.0	w.NCD	3.0	7.0	18.5
9 Dec	IPR	16.0	38.0	14.0		12.5	4.0	2.0	w.NCD	4.0	9.5	22.0
8–9 Dec	Quorum	18.2	34.9	15.5		13.1	4.7	2.8	w.NCD	3.7	7.1	16.7
6–8 Dec	Lorien	18.0	39.0	14.0	0.5	9.0	3.0	3.2	w.NCD	4.0	9.3	21.0
7 Dec	Euromedia	18.7	37.2	15.9		11.5	3.5	2.5	2.1	2.8	5.8	18.5
7 Dec	CISE	18.6	39.3	15.0		14.3	5.5	2.7	w.NCD	2.8	1.8	20.7
6–7 Nov	EMG	19.0	36.4	14.1		14.2	3.6	3.0	w.NCD	4.0	5.7	17.4
3–4 Dec	Ixè	18.9	38.4	14.5	0.4	10.1	3.6	3.0	1.6	2.4	7.1	19.5
2–3 Dec	SWG	17.8	38.6	14.0	0.7	11.2	3.3	3.0	w.NCD	4.3	7.1	20.8
1–3 Dec	Demopolis	17.0	38.0	12.5		13.0	3.8	3.5	w.NCD	4.3	7.9	21.0
1–2 Dec	Datamedia	17.2	37.5	13.5		12.0	3.7	3.0	1.2	2.8	9.1	20.3
1 Dec	Lorien	19.0	38.5	14.8	0.5	9.0	5.5	3.0	w.NCD	3.7	6.0	19.5
1 Dec	Piepoli	18.5	39.5	12.5		12.5	3.5	3.0	w.NCD	3.0	7.5	21.0
29–30 Nov	EMG	18.5	36.5	15.9		12.5	3.9	3.7	w.NCD	3.4	5.6	18.0
25–29 Nov	ScenariPolitici	17.5	37.4	13.0		14.8	3.0	3.1	1.3	2.0	7.9	19.9
26–27 Nov	Ixè	19.6	38.0	14.8	0.2	9.4	3.7	3.2	1.8	2.6	6.7	18.4
25–26 Nov	SWG	17.8	38.5	14.2	0.8	11.8	2.5	3.2	w.NCD	4.3	6.9	20.7
24–25 Nov	Datamedia	17.5	38.0	13.0		11.2	3.9	3.3	1.2	2.5	9.4	20.5
24 Nov	Piepoli	19.0	40.0	12.5		12.0	3.5	3.0	w.NCD	3.0	7.0	21.0
22–23 Nov	EMG	19.6	37.9	14.9		11.4	3.8	3.6	w.NCD	3.0	5.8	18.3
19–20 Nov	Ixè	19.8	38.2	15.0	0.1	9.0	3.5	3.4	2.2	2.8	6.0	18.4
17–19 Nov	SWG	19.7	39.0	15.9	0.4	9.2	3.4	3.9	w.NCD	3.2	5.3	19.3
18 Nov	Tecnè	18.0	38.0	16.0		10.0	3.0	3.0	w.NCD	4.0	8.0	20.0
18 Nov	IPR	17.5	40.0	14.0	0.5	10.5	3.5	2.0	w.NCD	4.0	8.0	22.5
18 Nov	Euromedia	19.5	37.5	16.1		9.8	4.1	4.0	1.3	2.7	5.0	18.0
17–18 Nov	Datamedia	18.0	38.0	14.0		10.0	4.0	3.5	1.2	2.5	8.8	20.0
17 Nov	Piepoli	20.0	39.5	14.0		10.0	3.5	3.0	w.NCD	3.0	7.0	19.5
15–16 Nov	Lorien	20.5	36.5	15.2	1.0	8.5	6.0	3.0	w.NCD	3.8	5.5	16.0
15–16 Nov	EMG	20.4	39.8	14.4		10.8	3.4	3.2	w.NCD	3.2	4.8	19.4
12–13 Nov	Ixè	20.0	38.5	15.0	0.2	8.7	3.2	3.5	2.0	2.7	6.2	18.5
10–13 Nov	Demos&Pi	19.8	36.3	16.2		10.8		3.6	w.NCD	3.8	9.5	16.5
11–12 Nov	Ipsos	20.8	38.3	16.1	0.6	8.1	4.0	3.0	1.7	3.2	4.2	17.5
11–12 Nov	SWG	19.2	39.9	14.8	0.7	9.8	2.8	3.1	w.NCD	3.8	5.9	20.7
10–11 Nov	Datamedia	19.0	39.7	14.0		9.2	3.8	3.5	1.2	2.5	7.1	20.7
10 Nov	Ipsos	20.6	38.6	15.5		8.5	3.8	3.5	1.5	3.3	4.7	18.0
10 Nov	Euromedia	19.8	38.1	15.4		9.5	3.7	4.3	1.3	2.8	5.1	18.3
10 Nov	Piepoli	20.0	40.5	14.5		8.5	3.5	3.0	w.NCD	3.0	7.0	20.5
9–10 Nov	Lorien	21.5	37.0	15.0	1.0	8.0	5.5	3.0	w.NCD	3.5	5.5	15.5
9–10 Nov	IPR	17.5	40.5	14.0		9.5	3.5	2.0	w.NCD	4.0	9.0	23.0
8–9 Nov	EMG	20.9	40.7	14.3		10.7	3.1	2.9	w.NCD	3.1	4.3	19.8
5–6 Nov	Ixè	19.9	38.9	15.2	0.3	8.5	3.2	3.6	2.0	2.5	5.9	19.0
4–5 Nov	Ipsos	20.6	38.6	15.5		8.5	3.8	3.5	1.5	3.3	4.7	18.0
4–5 Nov	SWG	19.0	40.1	15.9	0.4	9.3	2.9	3.4	w.NCD	3.4	5.6	21.1
3–4 Nov	Datamedia	18.9	40.0	14.0		8.8	3.5	3.8	1.2	2.5	7.3	21.1
3 Nov	Piepoli	20.5	40.0	15.0		8.0	3.5	3.0	w.NCD	3.0	7.0	19.5
29–30 Oct	Ixè	20.0	39.0	15.1	0.5	8.4	3.0	3.3	2.0	2.6	6.1	19.0
27–29 Oct	SWG	18.0	41.5	16.3	0.3	9.0	2.5	3.0	w.NCD	3.8	5.6	23.5
27–28 Oct	IPR	18.0	39.5	14.5	1.0	9.0	3.5	3.0	w.NCD	4.0	7.5	21.5
27 Oct	Tecnè	19.0	39.0	16.0		9.0	2.0	4.0	w.NCD	4.0	7.0	20.0
27 Oct	Piepoli	20.5	40.5	15.0		8.0	3.5	3.0	w.NCD	3.0	6.5	20.0
24–27 Oct	Datamedia	19.5	40.6	13.8		8.5	3.9	4.2	1.2	2.5	5.8	21.1
22–25 Oct	ScenariPolitici	19.1	38.9	14.8		9.3	2.9	3.3	1.3	2.2	8.2	19.8
22–23 Oct	Ixè	20.3	39.7	15.2	0.7	8.0	2.8	3.5	2.0	2.6	5.2	19.4
20–22 Oct	SWG	18.5	40.6	15.7	0.5	8.5	2.9	3.6	w.NCD	4.1	5.6	22.1
20 Oct	Euromedia	20.5	38.0	16.1		8.5	4.3	4.5	1.5	2.7	3.9	17.5
20 Oct	Piepoli	21.0	41.0	14.5		8.0	3.0	3.0	w.NCD	3.0	6.5	20.0
17–20 Oct	Datamedia	20.8	41.0	13.5		8.5	3.9	4.0	1.2	2.2	4.9	20.2
15–16 Oct	Ixè	20.9	39.9	15.1	0.8	8.3	2.7	3.3	1.9	2.5	4.6	19.0
13–15 Oct	SWG	19.9	39.6	17.2		7.8	2.4	3.2	w.NCD	4.1	5.8	19.7
13 Oct	Ipsos	21.3	39.8	15.8	0.7	7.1	3.4	3.3	1.4	3.2	4.0	18.5
13 Oct	Piepoli	21.5	40.5	15.0		7.5	3.0	3.0	w.NCD	3.0	6.5	19.0
10–13 Oct	Datamedia	20.3	40.0	13.5	0.4	8.2	3.8	4.0	1.2	2.0	6.6	19.7
5–10 Oct	Demos&Pi	19.6	41.2	15.6		8.8		3.8	w.NCD	2.6	8.4	21.6
8–9 Oct	Ixè	21.3	39.9	15.4	0.9	8.0	2.6	3.1	1.9	2.4	4.5	18.6
6–8 Oct	SWG	20.8	38.4	17.9		7.9	2.2	3.7	w.NCD	4.4	4.7	17.6
7 Oct	Euromedia	21.9	37.5	16.4		8.0	4.5	4.2	1.3	2.5	3.7	15.6
6 Oct	Piepoli	21.0	41.0	15.0		7.0	3.0	3.0	w.NCD	3.0	7.0	20.0
3–6 Oct	Datamedia	19.6	40.4	13.5	0.4	8.0	2.8	3.8	1.2	2.2	8.1	20.8
4–5 Oct	Lorien	23.0	38.0	16.0	1.0	6.5	4.0	2.5	w.NCD	3.5	5.5	15.0
1–2 Oct	Ixè	20.8	40.2	15.7	1.0	8.0	2.5	3.2	1.4	2.2	5.0	19.4
30 Sep–1 Oct	SWG	19.5	37.6	17.1	0.7	8.6	3.1	3.7	w.NCD	3.5	6.2	18.1
29 Sep	Piepoli	21.0	40.5	15.5		7.0	2.5	3.0	w.NCD	3.0	7.5	19.5
26–29 Sep	Datamedia	19.4	40.2	13.3	0.4	8.0	2.5	4.0	1.0	2.0	9.2	20.8
27 Sep	Tecnè	18.0	41.0	15.0		9.0	2.0	3.0	w.NCD	4.0	8.0	23.0
26 Sep	Ixè	20.2	40.5	16.0	1.0	7.8	2.3	2.9	1.8	2.4	5.1	20.3
22–24 Sep	SWG	21.5	37.6	15.9	0.9	8.1	2.7	3.0	w.NCD	3.9	6.4	16.1
23 Sep	IPR	20.0	39.5	15.0		8.0	3.0	2.0	w.NCD	4.0	8.5	19.5
22 Sep	Piepoli	21.0	40.0	15.5		7.0	2.5	3.0	w.NCD	3.5	7.5	19.0
19–22 Sep	Datamedia	19.8	38.0	15.0	0.5	7.9	2.4	3.9	1.2	2.2	9.1	18.2
17 Sep	Ixè	20.5	40.4	15.8	0.9	7.9	2.4	3.1	2.0	2.1	4.9	19.9
15–16 Sep	SWG	19.9	37.0	16.9	0.8	8.4	3.1	3.2	w.NCD	4.1	6.6	17.1
15 Sep	Piepoli	21.0	40.5	15.5		7.0	2.5	3.0	w.NCD	3.5	7.0	19.5
15 Sep	Ipsos	20.0	41.0	17.0	0.5	6.5	2.6	3.2	2.2	3.7	3.3	21.0
12–15 Sep	Datamedia	21.0	38.0	15.0	0.5	7.8	2.0	3.8	1.2	2.0	8.7	17.0
9–14 Sep	ScenariPolitici	20.9	36.8	15.6		9.0	2.3	3.4	0.9	2.4	8.2	15.9
12 Sep	Ixè	20.1	41.5	15.5	0.7	7.6	2.2	2.9	1.9	2.3	5.3	21.4
8–10 Sep	SWG	21.7	37.7	17.0	0.7	7.3	2.0	3.6	w.NCD	4.0	6.0	16.0
4–10 Sep	Demos&Pi	20.0	41.1	18.6		6.9		2.1	w.NCD	2.9	8.4	21.1
8 Sep	Piepoli	21.5	40.5	15.0		7.0	2.0	3.5	w.NCD	3.5	7.0	19.0
5–8 Sep	Datamedia	20.6	39.0	14.2	0.5	7.5	2.1	3.9	1.5	2.4	8.3	18.4
5 Sep	Ixè	20.5	41.9	15.7	0.7	7.8	1.7	2.7	1.8	2.4	4.8	21.4
1–3 Sep	SWG	20.8	37.9	18.0	0.6	7.8	2.1	3.4	w.NCD	4.3	5.1	17.1
1 Sep	Piepoli	21.5	40.5	15.5		6.5	2.5	3.5	w.NCD	3.5	6.5	19.0
29 Aug–1 Sep	Datamedia	21.1	39.2	14.9	0.5	7.8	2.0	3.7	1.5	2.4	6.9	18.1
30–31 Aug	Lorien	21.0	40.0	14.5	1.0	6.5	4.0	3.0	w.NCD	4.0	6.0	19.0
29 Aug	Ixè	20.3	42.3	15.9	0.9	7.3	1.8	2.8	1.6	2.2	4.9	22.0
27–28 Aug	SWG	21.8	39.7	16.8	0.4	7.2	2.8	3.0	w.NCD	3.5	4.8	17.9
25 Aug	Piepoli	21.5	40.0	15.5		7.0	2.5	3.5	w.NCD	3.5	6.5	18.5
22 Aug	Ixè	20.4	42.0	16.1	0.8	7.3	1.9	2.7	1.4	2.3	5.1	21.6
6–7 Aug	Ixè	20.4	41.9	16.3	0.9	7.2	2.1	2.7	1.3	2.5	4.7	21.5
4 Aug	Piepoli	21.5	40.5	15.0		7.0	2.5	3.5	w.NCD	4.0	6.0	19.0
30–31 Jul	Ixè	19.7	42.7	15.6	1.1	7.4	2.1	2.5	1.1	2.4	5.4	23.0
28–30 Jul	SWG	21.0	39.5	18.3	0.7	7.0	2.2	3.5	w.NCD	3.7	4.1	18.5
28 Jul	Piepoli	21.5	41.0	15.0		7.0	2.0	4.0	w.NCD	3.5	6.0	19.5
23–24 Jul	Ixè	20.2	42.5	16.1	1.2	7.1	2.3	2.6	1.0	2.6	4.4	22.3
21–22 Jul	SWG	20.7	38.9	17.7	0.7	7.1	2.9	3.3	w.NCD	4.0	4.7	18.2
21 Jul	Piepoli	21.5	41.5	15.5		6.5	2.0	4.0	w.NCD	3.5	5.5	20.0
18–19 Jul	Euromedia	22.5	39.3	17.5		5.5	3.8	3.5	1.3	2.8	3.8	16.8
16–17 Jul	Ixè	19.3	43.1	14.9	0.9	7.5	2.3	2.7	1.3	2.6	5.4	23.8
15–16 Jul	SWG	22.0	39.0	17.2	0.4	7.5	2.3	3.4	w.NCD	3.9	4.3	17.0
14 Jul	Piepoli	21.5	41.5	15.0		6.5	1.5	4.0	w.NCD	4.0	6.0	20.0
12–14 Jul	Demopolis	19.0	44.0	14.0		6.5		3.2	w.NCD	4.0	9.3	25.0
11 Jul	Euromedia	23.0	39.6	15.8		5.7	3.9	3.7	1.5	3.1	3.7	16.6
9–10 Jul	Ixè	19.4	43.4	15.3	1.2	7.8	2.1	2.4	1.1	2.5	4.8	24.0
8–9 Jul	SWG	20.0	41.0	17.3	0.5	6.9	1.7	3.3	w.NCD	4.1	5.2	21.0
7 Jul	Piepoli	21.5	41.5	15.0		6.5	2.0	4.0	w.NCD	4.0	5.5	20.0
4 Jul	Euromedia	22.5	41.0	16.7		6.2	2.6	3.4	w.NCD	3.7	3.9	18.5
1–2 Jul	SWG	19.7	41.8	16.6	0.8	7.0	1.8	3.0	w.NCD	4.1	5.2	22.1
30 Jun	Piepoli	21.0	41.5	15.5		6.5	2.0	4.0	w.NCD	4.0	5.5	20.5
28–30 Jun	Lorien	18.0	45.0	15.5	0.5	7.0	3.5	3.0	w.NCD	4.5	3.0	27.0
27 Jun	Euromedia	22.4	41.2	16.9		5.8	3.0	3.5	w.NCD	3.7	3.5	18.8
25–26 Jun	Demopolis	20.0	43.0	15.0		6.0		3.0	w.NCD	4.0	9.0	23.0
23–24 Jun	SWG	19.0	42.6	18.1	1.0	6.6	2.0	3.3	w.NCD	4.4	3.0	23.6
23 Jun	Piepoli	21.5	41.5	15.5		6.0	2.0	4.0	w.NCD	4.5	5.0	20.0
20 Jun	Euromedia	22.2	40.8	16.5		5.4	3.5	3.8	w.NCD	4.2	3.6	18.6
17–18 Jun	SWG	20.6	41.0	16.7	0.7	6.6	3.1	3.8	w.NCD	4.0	3.5	20.4
13–17 Jun	Demos&Pi	19.1	45.2	15.0		4.7		2.7	w.NCD	6.7	6.6	26.1
16 Jun	Piepoli	21.5	42.0	16.0		6.0	2.0	3.5	w.NCD	4.5	4.5	20.5
11 Jun	SWG	19.3	41.8	16.5	0.8	7.0	4.0	3.4	w.NCD	4.4	2.8	22.5
10 Jun	Piepoli	21.0	42.0	16.0		6.0	2.5	3.5	w.NCD	4.5	4.5	21.0
3–8 Jun	ScenariPolitici	20.9	37.3	17.5		6.0	2.6	4.0	1.2	2.9	7.6	16.4
5 Jun	SWG	17.8	42.1	17.5	0.5	6.5	4.6	3.9	w.NCD	4.1	3.0	24.3
1–3 Jun	Lorien	16.0	45.0	16.0	1.0	6.0	5.0	4.0	w.NCD	4.0	3.0	29.0
31 May	Piepoli	20.0	42.0	16.5	0.5	6.0	3.0	3.5	w.NCD	4.5	4.0	22.0
25 May 2014	EP Election	21.2	40.8	16.8	0.7	6.2	4.0	3.7	w.NCD	4.4	2.2	19.6
23 Apr	Epokè	23.0	33.1	13.5	3.8	6.2	3.2	2.7	1.6	3.4	9.5	10.1
22–23 Apr	Ixè	27.0	32.9	16.7	1.4	4.5	2.3	3.5	1.1	4.2	6.4	5.9
22 Apr	Tecnè	25.0	30.2	22.7		5.0	2.4	3.6		4.1	7.0	5.2
16–17 Apr	Ixè	25.3	33.5	16.8	1.5	4.6	2.7	3.4	1.2	4.4	6.6	8.2
15–17 Apr	ScenariPolitici	27.0	28.5	18.4	1.6	5.2	3.2	3.8	1.6	4.5	6.2	1.5
15 Apr	Tecnè	24.2	30.5	22.3		4.7	2.2	3.7		4.5	7.9	6.3
9–10 Apr	Ixè	24.9	32.9	17.2	1.4	4.9	3.1	3.7	1.4	3.8	6.7	8.0
7–9 Apr	Demopolis	23.0	34.0	18.0		4.0	3.0	3.5	w.NCD	6.5	8.0	11.0
8 Apr	Tecnè	23.1	30.9	22.1		4.5	2.4	3.6		4.3	9.1	7.8
2–3 Apr	Ixè	25.5	32.8	16.9	1.1	4.8	2.9	3.6	1.4	4.0	7.0	7.3
1–3 Apr	Demopolis	22.0	34.0	19.0							25.0	12.0
1 Apr	Tecnè	22.5	30.5	22.7		3.9	3.1	3.4	2.0	4.1	7.8	7.8
25–28 Mar	ScenariPolitici	26.1	28.6	19.0	1.5	5.6	3.1	3.5	1.9	4.1	6.6	2.5
27 Mar	Lorien	22.0	33.0	21.0	1.0	5.0	3.0	2.0	1.5	5.5	6.0	11.0
26–27 Mar	Ixè	24.6	31.7	18.4	1.2	5.5	2.8	3.3	1.2	3.9	7.4	7.1
26 Mar	IPR	21.5	30.5	21.5	1.0	3.7	3.5	2.9	1.9	4.5	9.0	9.0
26 Mar	Piepoli	19.5	34.5	20.0	2.5	3.5	3.0	3.0	1.5	4.0	8.5	14.5
26 Mar	Euromedia	20.5	31.2	21.4	1.3	4.5	3.6	3.0	1.2	3.8	9.5	9.8
25 Mar	Tecnè	21.4	31.1	23.4		3.6	3.0	3.2	2.1	3.9	8.3	7.7
25 Mar	Ipsos	20.2	34.1	22.6	2.4	3.4	3.3	3.0	1.8	5.0	4.2	11.5
21 Mar	SWG	20.4	31.6	21.9	1.6	5.2	3.6	2.7	1.5	3.7	7.8	9.7
19 Mar	Ixè	22.4	30.6	21.2	1.1	3.9	3.2	3.3	1.6	3.8	8.9	8.2
18 Mar	Tecnè	20.5	31.4	24.1		3.5	3.1	3.0	2.0	3.7	8.7	7.3
18 Mar	Ipsos	20.0	34.3	23.2	2.2	3.2	3.1	3.0	1.9	5.0	4.1	11.1
17 Mar	IPR	21.5	30.0	21.5	1.0	3.7	2.7	2.7	1.8	4.3	10.8	8.5
14–17 Mar	Datamedia	22.8	32.2	21.0	1.1	4.0	2.8	2.8	1.5	4.5	7.3	9.4
15–16 Mar	EMG	22.1	31.9	20.8	1.4	4.5	3.1	3.1	1.6	3.8	8.1	9.8
14 Mar	SWG	18.9	32.9	23.0	1.5	4.6	3.2	3.2	1.2	4.5	7.0	9.9
13 Mar	Ixè	21.9	31.0	22.0	1.4	4.0	2.9	3.1	1.6	3.7	8.4	9.0
11 Mar	Tecnè	21.1	29.5	25.2		3.8	2.8	3.3	2.2	3.6	8.5	4.3
11 Mar	Ipsos	20.8	34.0	23.9	2.1	3.3	2.6	2.6	2.1	4.9	3.7	10.1
11 Mar	Euromedia	20.5	29.1	22.8	1.3	4.4	3.5	2.7	1.5	3.9	10.3	6.3
10 Mar	IPR	22.0	30.0	22.0	1.5	3.7	2.5	2.7	1.7	4.5	9.4	8.0
7–10 Mar	Datamedia	22.5	31.1	22.0	1.1	4.0	3.0	2.8	1.8	4.5	7.2	8.6
8–9 Mar	EMG	23.8	30.4	21.0	1.5	4.2	3.3	3.2	1.6	3.5	7.5	6.6
7 Mar	SWG	22.0	30.3	21.6	2.3	4.9	3.9	2.7	1.1	3.3	7.9	8.3
6 Mar	Piepoli	17.5	34.5	20.0	3.0	3.5	3.5	2.5	2.0	5.0	8.5	14.5
5 Mar	Ixè	21.0	30.5	22.8	1.6	3.7	3.4	3.1	1.5	3.6	8.8	7.7
4 Mar	Tecnè	21.7	28.8	25.7		4.3	3.0	2.9	2.3	3.5	7.9	3.1
4 Mar	Ipsos	20.6	33.6	24.8	2.0	3.1	2.8	2.2	2.4	5.1	3.4	8.8
3 Mar	IPR	23.0	29.5	22.0	1.5	4.0	2.5	2.5	2.0	5.0	7.0	6.5
3 Mar	Euromedia	22.5	29.1	22.8	1.6	4.4	4.1	2.3	1.6	3.9	7.7	6.3
28 Feb–3 Mar	Datamedia	22.3	31.3	22.2	1.1	3.7	3.3	2.3	2.1	4.6	7.1	9.0
1–2 Mar	EMG	23.1	30.6	21.9	1.6	3.7	3.8	2.9	1.7	3.6	7.1	7.5
25–28 Feb	ScenariPolitici	25.4	27.8	20.3	2.1	5.2	3.5	3.0	2.0	4.0	6.7	2.4
25–28 Feb	Demos&Pi	21.3	34.8	21.5	2.0	3.3	4.0	2.2	2.1	4.1	4.7	13.3
28 Feb	SWG	21.7	30.7	22.1	1.8	5.2	4.1	2.3	1.5	3.6	6.0	8.6
28 Feb	IPR	23.2	29.3	22.0	1.5	4.0	2.5	2.5	2.0	5.0	8.0	6.1
27 Feb	Piepoli	18.5	34.5	19.5	2.5	3.5	3.5	2.5	2.0	5.5	8.0	15.0
27 Feb	Tecnè	23.4	28.9	25.4		4.0	2.7	2.7	2.2	3.6	7.1	3.5
26–27 Feb	Ixè	21.8	30.3	22.5	1.5	3.6	3.4	2.9	1.8	3.8	8.4	7.8
25 Feb	Ipsos	21.1	33.3	24.6	1.8	3.0	2.7	2.3	2.3	5.0	4.0	8.7
25 Feb	IPR	23.5	29.3	22.5	1.5	4.2	2.5	2.5	2.0	5.0	7.0	5.8
25 Feb	Euromedia	22.7	29.2	23.0	1.5	4.1	4.7	2.5	1.5	3.8	7.0	6.2
24–25 Feb	Lorien	22.5	31.0	22.0	1.5	4.0	3.5	1.5	2.0	6.0	6.0	8.5
21–24 Feb	Datamedia	22.7	30.0	22.5	1.0	3.8	3.0	2.2	2.3	4.8	7.0	7.3
22–23 Feb	EMG	23.6	29.8	22.0	1.6	3.8	3.7	2.8	1.9	3.7	7.1	6.2
21 Feb	IPR	23.7	29.5	22.0	1.0	4.0	2.5	2.5	2.3	5.0	7.5	5.8
21 Feb	Ixè	23.7	29.4	21.7	1.1	3.7	3.2	3.0	1.1	3.6	9.5	5.7
21 Feb	SWG	23.8	29.9	21.8	2.4	5.1	4.0	2.4	1.5	3.0	6.1	6.1
20 Feb	Tecnè	24.6	28.7	25.3	0.8	3.8	2.6	2.5	2.4	3.8	5.5	3.4
18 Feb	Euromedia	22.0	29.9	23.0	1.6	4.5	4.8	2.3	1.8	3.7	4.0	6.9
17–18 Feb	Demopolis	23.0	30.0	22.0	1.5	3.8	3.0	3.1		6.8	6.8	7.0
17 Feb	IPR	23.0	29.5	22.5	1.0	4.0	2.5	2.5	2.5	5.0	7.5	6.5
14–17 Feb	Datamedia	22.1	29.8	22.5	1.0	3.8	3.0	2.2	2.5	4.7	8.4	7.3
16 Feb	Ipsos	21.2	34.0	24.0	2.1	3.5	2.6	2.1	2.3	5.3	2.9	10.0
15–16 Feb	EMG	23.7	29.4	21.2	1.5	4.2	3.5	3.0	2.3	3.4	7.8	5.7
14 Feb	SWG	24.5	32.2	20.0	2.4	4.7	3.3	2.4	1.4	4.2	4.9	7.7
14 Feb	Ixè	22.4	30.5	21.6	1.5	3.5	2.9	2.5	2.4	3.7	9.0	8.1
14 Feb	IPR	23.5	29.5	21.5	1.0	3.7	2.5	2.5	2.5	5.0	8.3	6.0
13 Feb	Tecnè	21.6	31.0	25.4	0.9	3.4	2.1	2.6	2.5	4.3	7.1	5.6
12 Feb	ISPO	21.7	33.5	22.8	2.4	3.6	2.9	1.8	2.3	5.2	3.8	10.7
11 Feb	Ipsos	21.4	33.6	23.9	1.7	3.1	2.5	2.2	2.4	5.6	3.6	9.7
10 Feb	IPR	22.5	32.0	22.5	1.0	4.0	2.5	2.0	2.8	5.5	6.2	9.5
7–10 Feb	Datamedia	21.3	31.8	22.5	1.0	3.6	3.0	2.1	2.5	4.9	7.3	9.3
8–9 Feb	EMG	24.0	29.7	21.0	1.5	3.9	3.4	3.2	2.2	3.5	7.6	5.7
8–9 Feb	Lorien	21.0	31.5	21.5	2.0	3.5	3.5	2.0	2.5	6.0	5.5	10.0
8 Feb	IPR	22.5	31.0	22.5	1.5	3.5	2.5	2.0	2.5	5.5	6.5	8.5
7 Feb	SWG	21.5	33.4	21.2	2.6	5.3	3.6	2.2	1.3	3.6	5.4	11.9
7 Feb	Ixè	22.8	30.7	21.8	1.1	3.6	3.0	2.3	2.6	3.4	8.7	8.9
6 Feb	Piepoli	18.5	33.5	20.0	2.5	3.5	4.0	2.5	2.0	6.0	7.5	13.5
6 Feb	Tecnè	20.5	31.2	25.2	1.0	3.5	2.2	2.7	2.6	4.5	6.6	6.0
4 Feb	Ipsos	21.0	33.3	23.4	2.1	3.3	2.6	2.4	2.6	5.8	3.5	10.1
3–4 Feb	Demopolis	22.0	32.0	21.6		3.7	2.9	3.0		6.4	8.4	10.0
3 Feb	IPR	22.0	31.5	21.5	1.5	3.7	2.5	2.5	2.5	5.5	6.8	9.5
3 Feb	Euromedia	22.3	28.7	22.5	1.5	3.9	3.0	2.1	2.5	3.7	9.8	6.2
31 Jan–3 Feb	Datamedia	21.0	32.0	22.5	1.0	3.5	3.0	2.0	2.7	4.9	7.4	9.5
1–2 Feb	EMG	24.1	29.0	21.4	1.8	3.7	3.4	2.8	1.8	3.9	8.1	4.9
31 Jan	Ixè	21.1	31.4	22.8	1.4	3.5	2.8	2.1	1.8	3.9	9.2	8.6
31 Jan	SWG	21.9	31.3	20.1	2.2	4.7	3.5	2.7	1.3	4.2	8.1	9.4
30 Jan	Tecnè	20.9	31.1	24.9	1.2	3.3	2.0	2.9	2.8	4.3	6.6	6.2
29 Jan	Euromedia	22.1	28.5	22.3	1.6	4.1	3.2	2.2	2.6	3.6	9.8	6.2
28 Jan	Ipsos	20.7	33.5	23.3	2.3	3.2	2.2	2.2	3.1	6.0	3.5	10.2
28 Jan	ISPO	21.2	32.6	21.2	2.5	4.4	2.2	2.0	2.5	5.7	5.7	11.4
24–27 Jan	Datamedia	20.0	32.0	22.3	1.0	3.5	2.9	2.2	2.6	4.9	8.6	9.7
25–26 Jan	EMG	23.6	29.2	21.6	1.9	4.0	3.2	2.6	1.7	4.0	8.2	5.6
24 Jan	IPR	21.0	32.5	21.0	1.0	3.7	2.0	2.5	2.5	5.5	8.3	11.5
24 Jan	SWG	21.1	31.9	20.4	2.6	4.9	4.3	2.4	1.5	3.5	7.4	10.8
24 Jan	Ixè	21.8	31.1	22.3	1.6	3.7	2.9	2.1	1.9	3.7	8.9	8.8
20–24 Jan	ScenariPolitici	24.6	28.0	20.7	2.2	5.8	3.3	2.9	2.0	4.0	6.5	3.4
23 Jan	Tecnè	22.0	30.5	24.3	1.3	3.1	2.2	3.1	2.6	4.4	6.5	6.2
21 Jan	Ipsos	20.8	33.2	22.7	2.6	3.5	2.3	2.5	3.0	6.4	5.3	10.5
21 Jan	Euromedia	21.8	29.1	22.0	1.5	4.4	3.4	2.3	2.5	3.8	9.2	7.1
20 Jan	Demos&Pi	21.2	34.2	21.9	2.3	3.2	3.5	2.0	2.0	6.2	3.5	12.3
20 Jan	IPR	21.0	33.0	20.0	1.0	3.5	2.0	2.0	2.5	5.5	9.5	12.0
17–20 Jan	Datamedia	19.3	32.3	22.0	1.2	3.5	2.6	2.0	2.4	5.0	9.7	10.3
18–19 Jan	Lorien	19.5	33.0	21.5	2.0	3.0	3.5	2.0	2.5	7.0	6.0	11.5
17 Jan	SWG	19.9	32.4	20.8	2.4	5.2	3.9	2.8	1.6	3.8	7.2	11.6
17 Jan	Ixè	22.3	30.4	21.2	1.8	3.8	3.0	2.5	2.0	4.0	9.0	8.1
16 Jan	Tecnè	21.2	30.3	23.9	1.4	3.4	2.5	2.9	2.4	4.8	7.2	6.4
8–15 Jan	Demos&Pi	21.2	34.2	21.9	2.3	3.2	3.5	2.0	2.0	6.2	3.5	12.3
14 Jan	Ipsos	20.7	33.4	23.0	2.5	3.2	2.4	2.1	2.8	6.5	3.4	10.4
14 Jan	IPR	21.5	33.5	20.5	1.0	3.5	2.0	2.5	2.5	5.5	7.8	12.0
10–13 Jan	Datamedia	19.4	32.0	22.0	1.6	3.5	3.0	2.2	2.4	5.0	8.9	10.0
10 Jan	Euromedia	21.4	29.5	21.6	1.8	4.5	3.4	2.5	2.5	3.9	8.9	7.9
10 Jan	Ixè	22.1	31.3	21.5	1.9	3.4	2.8	2.1	2.2	4.1	8.6	9.2
10 Jan	SWG	20.0	33.9	21.0	2.0	4.7	3.8	2.5	1.4	3.8	6.9	12.9
9 Jan	Tecnè	20.6	29.7	22.9	1.5	3.8	3.1	3.1	2.6	5.0	7.7	6.8
7 Jan	Ipsos	21.2	33.0	22.3	2.3	3.5	2.7	1.9	3.1	7.0	3.0	10.7

=== 2013 ===
Date	Polling firm	M5S	PD	PdL/ FI	SC	LN	SEL	FdI	UdC	NCD	Others	Lead
23 Dec	ISPO	21.2	32.5	20.3	2.7	3.5	3.3	2.2	2.9	7.1	4.3	11.3
20 Dec	Ixè	21.3	30.5	21.0	2.2	3.8	3.1	2.4	2.3	4.6	8.8	9.2
20 Dec	IPR	20.0	32.5	19.0	1.3	3.5	3.0	2.5	2.5	6.5	9.2	12.5
20 Dec	SWG	18.2	34.8	20.8	2.0	5.7	3.2	2.4	1.4	4.7	6.8	14.0
19 Dec	Tecnè	21.7	29.4	23.3	1.6	3.4	2.7	2.8	2.9	5.3	6.9	6.1
15–18 Dec	ScenariPolitici	23.6	29.3	19.8	1.8	5.4	2.9	3.2	1.9	4.4	7.7	5.7
17 Dec	Ipsos	20.9	32.2	21.8	2.2	3.3	3.2	1.8	2.9	7.5	4.2	10.4
16 Dec	IPR	21.0	32.0	20.5	1.5	3.7	3.5	2.5	2.5	7.0	5.8	11.0
13–16 Dec	Datamedia	21.7	30.6	21.0	1.6	3.6	3.1	2.0	2.2	5.0	9.2	8.9
14–15 Dec	Lorien	19.0	33.0	20.5	2.5	3.5	3.5	3.0	2.5	6.5	6.0	12.5
13–15 Dec	EMG	21.7	31.0	21.1	2.2	3.3	2.7	2.6	2.4	4.1	8.9	9.3
13 Dec	Euromedia	22.5	28.0	21.4	1.9	4.3	3.3	2.4	2.6	3.6	10.0	5.5
13 Dec	EULAB	18.9	29.9	19.5	3.5	3.9	3.8	3.4	3.2	7.3	6.6	10.4
13 Dec	Ixè	21.9	29.5	21.3	2.1	4.0	3.4	2.2	2.3	4.8	8.5	7.6
13 Dec	Tecnè	23.2	28.0	23.1	1.7	3.6	3.0	2.6	3.2	5.6	6.0	4.8
13 Dec	SWG	18.1	35.6	18.9	1.9	5.5	3.9	2.8	1.8	5.0	6.5	16.7
11 Dec	IPR	21.0	31.0	20.5	1.5	3.5	3.5	2.5	2.5	7.5	6.5	10.0
9–11 Dec	Demopolis	22.5	30.0	21.0	2.0	3.8	3.0	2.5	2.6	6.2	6.4	7.5
10 Dec	Ipsos	21.5	31.6	22.5	2.4	3.0	3.1	1.6	2.7	7.4	4.2	9.1
9 Dec	Euromedia	23.0	27.5	21.3	1.8	4.5	3.3	2.5	2.7	3.8	9.6	4.5
6–9 Dec	Datamedia	21.9	30.2	20.2	1.7	3.5	3.3	2.0	2.0	5.3	9.9	8.3
6–8 Dec	EMG	22.3	29.6	20.6	2.2	3.8	3.2	2.9	2.5	5.0	7.9	7.3
6 Dec	SWG	21.1	29.6	21.6	2.7	5.0	3.5	2.3	1.6	4.6	8.0	8.0
6 Dec	Ixè	23.3	27.4	20.9	2.2	3.5	3.7	2.4	2.6	5.3	8.7	4.1
6 Dec	Euromedia	24.0	25.8	22.0	2.5	4.2	3.6	3.0	2.8	3.5	8.6	1.8
5 Dec	Tecnè	23.8	26.8	22.8	2.1	3.3	3.4	2.8	3.0	5.4	6.6	3.0
2–4 Dec	Demopolis	23.0	28.0	21.5	2.0	3.6	3.0	2.4	2.5	7.0	7.0	5.0
3 Dec	Ipsos	21.2	31.0	22.2	2.2	3.3	2.8	2.1	3.0	7.6	4.6	8.8
2 Dec	Tecnè	23.4	26.4	22.2	2.0	3.4	3.9	3.0	2.8	6.2	6.7	3.0
2 Dec	IPR	22.5	28.5	20.0	1.5	3.7	3.5	2.5	2.5	7.5	7.8	6.0
29 Nov–2 Dec	Datamedia	22.2	28.5	20.0	1.8	3.4	3.4	2.1	2.0	5.6	11.0	6.3
29 Nov	ISPO	21.8	30.5	20.3	3.5	3.0	3.6	2.7	3.2	7.3	4.1	8.7
29 Nov	Euromedia	23.2	26.1	21.7	2.5	4.3	3.7	2.8	2.8	3.7	9.2	2.9
29 Nov	Ixè	24.5	26.7	20.6	2.2	3.7	3.6	2.3	1.8	5.2	9.4	2.2
29 Nov	SWG	19.4	30.2	21.6	2.6	4.5	4.0	2.4	1.3	5.2	8.8	8.6
28–29 Nov	EMG	23.2	28.7	20.0	2.0	4.1	3.4	2.7	2.4	5.3	8.2	5.5
25–29 Nov	Demos&Pi	21.4	29.1	20.8	3.2	4.1	4.0	2.0	2.1	5.3	8.0	7.7
27 Nov	IPR	23.0	28.5	20.0	1.5	3.7	3.5	2.5	2.5	8.0	6.8	5.5
26 Nov	Ipsos	21.0	30.7	21.3	2.8	3.2	3.1	2.7	2.6	8.0	4.6	9.4
25 Nov	IPR	23.5	28.0	19.5	1.7	3.7	3.5	2.5	2.3	8.0	7.3	4.5
25 Nov	Tecnè	23.9	26.8	21.1	2.1	3.5	3.7	3.2	2.6	6.9	6.2	2.9
22–25 Nov	Datamedia	20.8	28.9	19.5	1.8	3.6	3.4	2.2	2.0	5.9	11.9	8.1
23–24 Nov	Lorien	18.5	31.0	19.0	3.5	4.0	4.0	3.5	3.0	7.5	6.0	12.0
22–24 Nov	EMG	23.6	28.2	19.6	2.1	4.3	3.4	2.4	2.4	5.8	8.2	4.6
22 Nov	Ixè	25.0	27.3	17.3	2.8	3.5	4.1	2.6	2.6	6.2	8.6	2.3
22 Nov	SWG	19.8	27.4	21.1	2.7	5.1	4.3	2.9	1.6	6.0	9.1	6.3
20 Nov	Piepoli	21.5	30.5	18.0	2.5	4.0	4.0	2.5	2.5	6.0	8.5	9.0
19 Nov	Euromedia	24.2	26.5	20.1	2.1	4.1	4.2	3.5	2.5	3.6	9.2	2.3
19 Nov	Ipsos	20.8	30.6	20.7	3.0	3.1	3.3	3.1	3.0	7.8	4.6	9.8
18 Nov	Datamedia	20.0	30.3	18.1	2.0	3.5	3.5	2.0	1.6	7.0	12.0	10.3
18 Nov	IPR	23.0	29.5	18.5	1.5		4.0			9.0	14.5	6.5
18 Nov	ISPO	22.8	29.2	16.0	3.2	3.5	3.5	3.3	2.9	10.5	5.1	6.4
15–17 Nov	EMG	22.0	30.0	18.1	2.4	3.9	3.6	2.3	2.3	7.1	8.3	8.0
15 Nov	Tecnè	25.3	25.5	25.6	2.5	3.7	4.3	3.8	2.9	Did not exist	6.4	0.1
15 Nov	SWG	20.8	28.3	22.8	3.3	5.8	4.0	3.5	1.9	Did not exist	9.6	5.5
15 Nov	Ixè	25.3	26.8	24.4	2.5	3.8	4.7	2.2	2.4	Did not exist	7.9	1.5
11–13 Nov	Demopolis	22.0	28.0	23.0	2.2	4.0	4.1	2.5	3.0	Did not exist	11.2	5.0
12 Nov	Ipsos	21.4	30.4	26.3	3.7	3.5	3.4	3.2	3.4	Did not exist	4.7	4.1
11 Nov	IPR	22.0	29.5	23.0	2.0	3.7	4.0	2.5	2.0	Did not exist	11.3	6.5
11 Nov	Datamedia	20.7	29.5	23.0	3.2	4.1	4.2	2.2	2.1	Did not exist	11.0	6.5
8–10 Nov	EMG	21.7	29.8	23.9	2.6	4.0	4.2	2.3	2.2	Did not exist	9.3	5.9
8 Nov	Tecnè	24.8	26.1	25.3	2.8	3.5	4.2	3.4	3.1	Did not exist	6.8	0.8
8 Nov	SWG	21.3	28.8	24.2	2.4	5.1	4.8	3.0	2.2	Did not exist	8.2	4.6
8 Nov	Ixè	24.5	28.2	24.0	3.2	3.9	4.2	2.2	2.5	Did not exist	7.3	3.7
5 Nov	Ipsos	21.2	29.7	25.8	3.8	3.5	4.2	3.1	3.2	Did not exist	5.5	3.9
4 Nov	IPR	21.0	30.5	23.0	2.5	3.7	4.0	2.5	2.2	Did not exist	10.6	7.5
4 Nov	Datamedia	20.5	29.7	22.9	3.4	4.2	4.1	2.6	2.0	Did not exist	10.6	6.8
1–3 Nov	Lorien	17.3	31.2	24.2	4.2	5.0	4.5	3.0	2.7	Did not exist	7.9	7.0
31 Oct–3 Nov	EMG	20.4	30.5	23.7	3.0	4.2	4.4	2.5	2.1	Did not exist	9.2	6.8
1 Nov	Tecnè	24.3	27.0	24.9	3.0	3.8	4.0	3.2	2.9	Did not exist	6.9	2.1
31 Oct	SWG	19.2	28.8	26.2	3.2	5.4	4.5	2.4	2.2	Did not exist	8.1	2.6
31 Oct	Ixè	24.1	29.0	23.5	2.9	4.1	4.1	2.3	2.5	Did not exist	7.5	4.9
29 Oct	ISPO	21.8	30.1	23.5	4.0	4.6	4.1	2.6	2.1	Did not exist	7.2	6.6
29 Oct	Ipsos	21.3	30.2	25.0	3.6	3.7	4.0	3.2	3.4	Did not exist	5.6	5.2
28 Oct	IPR	22.0	29.0	23.5	3.0	3.7	4.0	2.4	2.2	Did not exist	10.2	5.5
25–28 Oct	Datamedia	20.4	30.0	22.8	3.5	4.2	4.2	2.4	2.0	Did not exist	10.5	7.2
25–27 Oct	EMG	21.0	30.1	24.1	2.9	4.2	4.7	2.3	2.0	Did not exist	8.7	6.0
25 Oct	Tecnè	24.1	27.2	24.2	3.2	3.9	3.7	3.2	3.1	Did not exist	7.4	3.0
25 Oct	SWG	20.6	28.0	25.3	2.9	5.6	4.3	2.1	2.4	Did not exist	8.8	2.7
25 Oct	Ixè	24.6	27.8	23.1	2.9	4.4	4.2	2.5	2.7	Did not exist	7.8	3.2
23 Oct	Piepoli	20.0	30.0	23.5	2.5	4.0	4.0	2.5	2.5	Did not exist	11.0	6.5
22 Oct	Ipsos	21.6	29.8	24.8	3.2	3.8	3.6	3.3	3.7	Did not exist	6.2	5.0
21 Oct	IPR	22.5	28.0	25.0	3.7	4.0	4.0	2.3	1.8	Did not exist	8.7	3.0
18–21 Oct	Datamedia	22.0	28.5	24.4	4.0	4.0	4.0	2.2	2.0	Did not exist	8.9	4.1
19–20 Oct	Lorien	18.1	29.8	24.1	4.6	4.9	4.5	3.0	2.4	Did not exist	8.6	5.7
17–19 Oct	EMG	21.5	29.0	25.4	3.2	4.0	4.6	2.2	1.8	Did not exist	8.3	3.6
18 Oct	Tecnè	22.0	28.8	24.6	4.4	4.5	3.8	2.8	2.3	Did not exist	6.8	4.2
18 Oct	SWG	21.2	27.9	24.1	4.0	5.5	4.4	2.9	1.3	Did not exist	8.7	3.8
18 Oct	Ixè	21.8	28.4	24.5	4.5	4.0	4.3	2.2	2.1	Did not exist	8.2	3.9
15 Oct	Ipsos	21.4	30.6	25.1	4.7	4.0	3.8	2.8	3.0	Did not exist	4.6	5.5
14 Oct	IPR	22.0	28.5	24.5	4.0	3.5	4.0	2.4	2.0	Did not exist	9.1	4.0
14 Oct	ISPO	21.5	30.9	23.0	5.8	5.2	3.5	2.1	2.1	Did not exist	5.9	7.9
11–14 Oct	Datamedia	21.8	28.0	24.0	5.2	3.8	4.0	2.2	2.2	Did not exist	8.8	4.0
12–13 Oct	Lorien	16.9	30.0	23.0	4.5	4.6	5.0	3.0	2.5	Did not exist	10.5	7.0
11 Oct	Tecnè	23.1	29.2	23.7	4.2	4.3	4.2	2.7	2.2	Did not exist	6.4	5.5
11 Oct	SWG	20.0	27.0	24.6	5.1	5.5	5.1	2.8	1.2	Did not exist	8.7	2.4
11 Oct	Ixè	24.3	28.9	22.6	4.5	4.1	4.0	2.3	2.0	Did not exist	7.3	4.6
10–11 Oct	EMG	20.6	28.7	25.2	4.4	4.2	4.5	2.4	1.6	Did not exist	8.4	3.5
7–10 Oct	ScenariPolitici	25.4	27.1	21.0	4.2	4.6	4.4	3.4	1.9	Did not exist	8.0	1.7
8 Oct	Ipsos	21.2	30.5	24.7	4.9	3.5	4.3	2.3	2.8	Did not exist	5.8	5.8
7 Oct	IPR	22.0	29.5	24.0	4.0	3.7	4.5	2.2	2.0	Did not exist	8.1	5.5
7 Oct	Ixè	24.1	28.5	22.7	4.6	3.9	4.2	2.2	2.1	Did not exist	7.7	4.4
4–7 Oct	Datamedia	22.1	29.0	23.2	5.2	3.8	3.9	2.4	2.0	Did not exist	8.4	5.8
4 Oct	Tecnè	22.4	30.1	22.3	4.6	4.7	4.0	3.0	2.4	Did not exist	6.5	7.7
4 Oct	Euromedia	22.0	25.0	26.0						Did not exist	27.0	1.0
3–4 Oct	EMG	19.5	29.6	24.1	5.3	4.2	4.5	2.3	1.3	Did not exist	9.2	5.5
2–4 Oct	Demos&Pi	20.9	32.2	20.0	4.1	4.5	3.8	2.4	3.3	Did not exist	8.8	11.3
3 Oct	IPR	22.5	28.5	25.0	4.0	3.5	4.5	2.0	1.5	Did not exist	8.5	3.5
3 Oct	SWG	19.1	31.2	24.8	4.6	4.5	3.8	2.4	1.4	Did not exist	8.2	6.4
1 Oct	SWG	20.0	27.0	25.9	5.0	4.9	4.7	2.3	1.1	Did not exist	9.1	1.1
1 Oct	Ipsos	21.4	30.0	24.0	3.8	3.7	4.6	2.5	3.2	Did not exist	6.8	6.0
30 Sep	IPR	22.0	28.5	25.0	4.0	3.7	4.5	2.3	2.0	Did not exist	8.0	3.5
30 Sep	Datamedia	20.5	27.1	25.8	4.8	4.1	4.3	2.2	1.8	Did not exist	9.4	1.3
29 Sep	Lorien	18.5	29.8	22.5	4.5	4.5	5.4	3.5	2.8	Did not exist	8.5	7.3
26–29 Sep	EMG	19.7	29.2	25.0	5.2	4.0	4.3	2.4	1.3	Did not exist	8.9	4.2
27 Sep	Tecnè	22.2	27.1	25.0	5.3	4.2	4.5	3.3	2.8	Did not exist	5.6	2.1
27 Sep	SWG	18.8	28.0	27.0	4.5	4.8	4.5	1.8	1.4	Did not exist	9.2	1.0
27 Sep	Ixè	22.4	27.5	26.6	4.2	3.3	4.1	2.1	1.9	Did not exist	7.9	0.9
23–25 Sep	Datamedia	18.5	28.0	27.0		4.1	4.2	2.1		Did not exist	16.1	1.0
24 Sep	Ipsos	21.0	29.4	27.0	3.7	3.4	4.4	2.1	3.0	Did not exist	6.0	2.4
21–22 Sep	Lorien	18.0	29.5	26.2	4.4	4.7	5.1	3.1	2.5	Did not exist	6.5	3.3
20 Sep	Tecnè	21.8	27.6	25.4	5.8	4.4	4.1	3.0	2.1	Did not exist	5.8	2.2
20 Sep	SWG	18.3	28.5	27.7	3.9	4.3	4.5	2.1	1.0	Did not exist	9.7	0.8
19–20 Sep	EMG	21.4	27.4	25.6	4.9	4.1	4.4	2.4	1.4	Did not exist	8.4	1.8
17 Sep	Ipsos	20.3	29.3	27.3	3.9	3.6	5.0	2.5	2.8	Did not exist	5.3	2.0
15–17 Sep	Demopolis	19.0	27.5	27.0	3.7	3.9	5.0		2.8	Did not exist	11.1	0.5
14–15 Sep	Lorien	17.8	30.7	25.0	4.6	4.8	4.8	3.3	2.8	Did not exist	6.2	5.7
13 Sep	Tecnè	20.4	28.1	26.9	5.4	5.0	3.8	2.8	1.9	Did not exist	5.7	1.2
13 Sep	SWG	20.5	26.0	28.0	4.1	4.6	4.8	2.2	1.2	Did not exist	8.6	2.0
12–13 Sep	EMG	20.0	27.3	26.9	5.3	3.8	4.6	2.2	1.2	Did not exist	8.7	0.4
12 Sep	ISPO	18.9	29.1	28.2	4.7	4.0	4.7	2.0	1.9	Did not exist	6.5	0.9
10–12 Sep	Demos&Pi	20.9	28.5	26.2	3.6	3.1	4.8	2.2	2.6	Did not exist	8.1	2.3
10 Sep	Ipsos	19.4	29.1	27.5	4.1	3.8	4.8	2.7	2.8	Did not exist	5.8	1.6
6 Sep	Tecnè	19.2	27.6	27.2	6.2	5.3	4.0	2.3	1.7	Did not exist	6.5	0.4
6 Sep	SWG	19.8	26.0	27.9	3.9	4.7	5.6	1.9	1.6	Did not exist	8.6	1.9
5–6 Sep	EMG	19.5	27.8	27.3	4.8	3.4	4.5	2.2	1.2	Did not exist	9.3	0.5
4 Sep	Euromedia	19.5	26.0	28.5	3.5	3.5	6.0	2.0	2.5	Did not exist	8.5	2.5
3 Sep	IPR	19.5	24.5	27.5	4.0	3.7	6.0		2.0	Did not exist	12.8	3.0
3 Sep	Tecnè	17.7	27.3	26.3	5.5	4.9	5.5	3.0	1.8	Did not exist	8.0	1.0
31 Aug–1 Sep	Lorien	19.0	29.0	25.8	5.5	4.2	5.5	3.0	2.1	Did not exist	5.9	3.2
30 Aug	SWG	20.1	24.0	27.9	4.5	5.1	6.6	1.5	1.2	Did not exist	9.1	3.9
5 Aug	IPR	19.0	26.0	27.5	4.0	3.7	5.5		2.0	Did not exist	12.3	1.5
2 Aug	SWG	18.2	24.7	28.3	4.1	4.6	6.3	2.1	1.5	Did not exist	10.2	3.6
2 Aug	Tecnè	17.0	25.8	27.1	6.0	2.9	7.2	4.4	1.4	Did not exist	7.2	1.3
26 Jul	SWG	20.0	23.5	27.0	4.9	4.0	6.4	1.6	1.5	Did not exist	11.1	3.5
26 Jul	Tecnè	16.3	26.8	28.3	5.7	3.5	6.8	4.2	1.5	Did not exist	6.9	1.5
25–26 Jul	EMG	20.6	26.8	27.2	4.6	3.2	5.4	2.3	1.5	Did not exist	8.4	0.4
22 Jul	IPR	18.5	27.5	26.0	5.0	3.5	5.0		2.0	Did not exist	12.5	1.5
20–21 Jul	Lorien	17.0	28.6	26.0	5.5	3.9	5.6	4.2	2.3	Did not exist	6.9	1.6
19 Jul	Piepoli	18.5	28.5	25.0	5.0	4.0	4.5	2.0	2.5	Did not exist	10.0	3.5
19 Jul	SWG	18.5	25.5	26.5	4.4	4.2	6.4	2.0	1.5	Did not exist	11.0	1.0
19 Jul	Tecnè	16.4	27.6	28.0	5.4	3.4	6.6	4.0	1.7	Did not exist	6.9	0.4
18–19 Jul	EMG	20.0	26.4	27.7	4.9	3.5	5.2	2.3	1.6	Did not exist	8.4	1.3
15–19 Jul	ScenariPolitici	23.6	24.5	24.0	4.7	4.5	5.6	3.2	1.8	Did not exist	8.1	0.5
12 Jul	SWG	18.6	26.3	26.6	4.0	4.9	5.4	1.8	1.7	Did not exist	10.7	0.3
12 Jul	Tecnè	15.9	28.5	28.3	5.1	3.6	5.0	3.7	2.1	Did not exist	6.8	0.2
11–12 Jul	EMG	19.2	26.6	27.2	4.8	4.2	5.4	2.4	1.5	Did not exist	8.7	0.6
11 Jul	IPR	17.5	28.5	25.5	5.0	3.5	5.0		2.0	Did not exist	13.0	3.0
5–8 Jul	Demopolis	17.8	28.0	26.5	4.0	3.5	5.2		2.8	Did not exist	12.2	1.5
5 Jul	SWG	17.3	26.0	28.3	4.9	4.9	5.7	2.0	1.4	Did not exist	9.5	2.3
5 Jul	Tecnè	16.0	29.2	28.5	4.9	3.2	5.8	3.4	2.0	Did not exist	7.0	0.7
4–5 Jul	EMG	17.6	28.1	27.0	4.4	3.9	5.7	2.4	1.5	Did not exist	9.4	1.1
3 Jul	IPR	18.5	28.0	25.0	5.0	3.5	4.5		2.0	Did not exist	13.5	3.0
3 Jul	Piepoli	19.5	28.0	25.0	4.5	4.0	4.5	2.0	2.5	Did not exist	10.0	3.0
2 Jul	Euromedia	16.1	28.0	28.1	4.5	3.9	4.9	2.0	2.6	Did not exist	9.9	0.1
2 Jul	Ipsos	16.6	29.2	27.2	5.6	3.4	5.2	2.4	2.3	Did not exist	8.1	2.0
29–30 Jun	Lorien	17.6	30.6	26.3	5.8	3.6	5.5	3.0	2.8	Did not exist	4.8	4.3
28 Jun	SWG	18.1	27.6	26.8	5.3	5.2	4.6	2.2	1.3	Did not exist	8.9	0.8
28 Jun	Tecnè	16.2	29.6	28.5	4.5	2.8	6.1	3.1	2.2	Did not exist	7.0	1.1
27–28 Jun	EMG	17.0	29.0	26.6	4.1	3.5	5.7	2.3	1.6	Did not exist	10.2	2.4
25–28 Jun	Demopolis	18.0	28.0	26.0						Did not exist	28.0	2.0
25 Jun	Ipsos	17.0	29.3	27.3	5.8	3.5	5.3	2.2	2.0	Did not exist	7.6	2.0
21 Jun	SWG	16.9	27.6	25.9	5.2	4.7	5.3	2.3	1.7	Did not exist	10.4	1.7
21 Jun	Tecnè	16.9	29.2	29.0	4.7	2.8	5.6	2.7	2.1	Did not exist	7.0	0.2
20–21 Jun	EMG	17.9	27.8	27.0	4.6	3.6	5.8	1.9	1.3	Did not exist	10.1	0.8
20 Jun	Datamonitor	18.0	28.4	28.8	4.6	3.8	5.0	2.0	1.7	Did not exist	7.7	0.4
19 Jun	IPR	17.5	27.5	27.5	5.2	3.5	5.0		1.5	Did not exist	12.3	0.0
18 Jun	Ipsos	17.8	29.0	27.5	5.4	3.4	5.1	2.0	2.4	Did not exist	7.4	1.5
15–17 Jun	Lorien	19.0	28.8	28.0	5.5	3.1	5.3	2.0	2.4	Did not exist	5.9	0.8
15 Jun	Tecnè	18.0	28.1	29.2	4.5	2.9	5.0	2.9	2.2	Did not exist	7.2	1.1
14 Jun	SWG	17.9	28.1	26.0	4.8	4.4	4.8	2.0	1.8	Did not exist	10.2	2.1
13–14 Jun	EMG	18.8	28.5	27.3	4.8	4.1	5.6	1.8	1.2	Did not exist	7.9	1.2
11 Jun	Ipsos	18.5	28.5	27.3	5.2	3.5	5.0	1.6	2.6	Did not exist	7.8	1.2
10 Jun	Tecnè	18.8	26.8	29.7	4.7	3.1	4.7	3.1	2.3	Did not exist	6.8	3.1
7 Jun	SWG	19.9	25.1	27.7	4.7	4.3	5.5	1.5	2.2	Did not exist	9.1	2.6
6–7 Jun	EMG	19.7	27.8	28.1	4.6	3.9	5.4	1.7	1.1	Did not exist	7.7	0.3
4 Jun	SpinCon	20.1	25.3	27.1	3.1	4.0	5.9	3.5	1.9	Did not exist	9.1	1.8
4 Jun	Ipsos	19.8	27.7	27.7	5.5	3.7	4.7	1.8	2.0	Did not exist	7.1	0.0
3 Jun	IPR	22.0	24.5	27.3	5.5	3.7	4.3		1.3	Did not exist	11.4	2.8
3 Jun	Piepoli	21.5	24.5	25.5	5.0	4.5	5.0	2.0	2.5	Did not exist	9.5	1.0
31 May	SpinCon	20.2	24.6	26.3	3.7	4.2	6.1	3.5	1.6	Did not exist	9.8	1.7
31 May	SWG	19.1	25.8	27.8	5.2	4.7	5.0	1.8	1.7	Did not exist	8.9	2.0
31 May	Tecnè	19.8	25.8	29.3	5.0	3.3	4.4	2.9	2.4	Did not exist	7.1	3.5
30–31 May	EMG	22.1	25.4	26.8	4.8	4.2	5.6	2.0	1.2	Did not exist	7.9	1.4
27–31 May	ScenariPolitici	22.7	25.4	27.0	4.7	4.4	4.9	2.3	1.6	Did not exist	7.0	1.6
30 May	Piepoli	22.5	24.0	25.0	5.0	5.0	4.5	2.0	2.5	Did not exist	9.5	1.0
28 May	Ipsos	21.2	26.8	27.8	6.0	3.8	4.1	1.6	2.1	Did not exist	6.6	1.0
26–27 May	Lorien	19.3	26.5	28.2	5.9	3.2	5.0	2.3	2.3	Did not exist	7.3	1.7
24 May	SWG	22.6	22.6	27.8	4.9	4.9	4.8	1.5	2.0	Did not exist	8.9	5.2
24 May	Tecnè	21.0	24.5	30.0	5.5	3.7	4.0	2.1	2.3	Did not exist	6.9	5.5
23–24 May	EMG	24.2	23.7	26.0	5.1	4.7	5.5	2.0	1.4	Did not exist	7.4	1.8
21 May	SpinCon	21.2	23.1	27.7	3.5	4.4	5.5	3.2	1.7	Did not exist	9.7	4.6
21 May	Ipsos	23.6	26.3	28.6	5.3	3.7	4.4	1.5	1.8	Did not exist	4.8	2.3
17 May	SpinCon	22.1	23.3	27.6	4.1	4.0	6.1	3.0	1.6	Did not exist	8.2	4.3
17 May	SWG	21.8	24.0	27.4	5.8	4.4	4.7	1.8	1.8	Did not exist	8.3	3.4
17 May	Tecnè	21.4	23.6	30.3	5.9	3.9	3.7	2.2	2.2	Did not exist	6.8	6.7
16–17 May	EMG	23.0	23.0	26.5	5.7	4.8	6.1	2.1	1.4	Did not exist	7.4	3.5
15 May	Piepoli	25.0	23.0	25.0	5.5	5.0	4.5	2.0	2.0	Did not exist	8.0	0.0
14 May	IPR	24.0	22.0	28.0	5.0	3.5	5.5		1.0	Did not exist	11.0	4.0
14 May	Ipsos	22.5	26.5	29.2	5.8	3.5	4.3	1.8	1.6	Did not exist	4.8	2.7
11 May	Demos&Pi	22.9	25.0	26.6	5.6	3.2	4.2	2.1	2.8	Did not exist	7.6	1.6
10 May	Tecnè	21.8	22.6	29.8	5.7	4.4	4.3	2.4	2.5	Did not exist	6.5	7.2
10 May	SWG	21.8	24.0	27.6	5.4	4.5	4.9	1.8	1.7	Did not exist	8.3	3.6
9–10 May	EMG	23.4	22.8	26.6	5.3	4.3	6.0	2.2	1.4	Did not exist	8.0	3.2
9 May	ISPO	23.7	23.6	29.1	6.1	4.1	5.3	1.6	1.7	Did not exist	4.8	5.4
8 May	IPR	26.5	22.0	27.0	5.0	4.0	5.5		1.0	Did not exist	9.0	0.5
7 May	Ipsos	23.0	26.5	30.0	6.6	3.2	3.8	1.1	1.1	Did not exist	4.7	3.5
6 May	Euromedia	23.7	20.5	27.5	5.6	3.8	7.7	2.1	2.5	Did not exist	6.6	3.8
5 May	SpinCon	23.5	23.5	27.7	4.4	4.0	5.4	2.9	1.3	Did not exist	7.3	4.2
4–5 May	Lorien	25.5	24.0	27.1	5.9	2.4	4.8	2.4	2.5	Did not exist	5.4	1.6
3 May	SpinCon	23.2	22.8	28.5	5.1	3.7	5.7	2.8	1.5	Did not exist	6.7	5.3
3 May	Tecnè	22.0	22.8	28.1	6.1	4.6	4.7	2.3	2.9	Did not exist	6.5	5.3
3 May	SWG	23.7	23.8	26.8	5.7	4.2	5.1	1.2	2.0	Did not exist	7.5	3.0
2–3 May	EMG	25.9	22.3	27.3	4.4	4.0	5.8	2.0	1.5	Did not exist	6.8	1.4
1 May	Piepoli	25.5	22.5	25.0	6.0	5.0	4.5	1.5	2.0	Did not exist	8.0	0.5
30 Apr	IPR	27.0	22.0	27.5	5.0	3.7	6.0		1.0	Did not exist	7.8	0.5
30 Apr	Ipsos	25.1	25.5	27.7	7.4	3.6	3.2	1.4	0.8	Did not exist	5.3	2.2
27 Apr	Piepoli	25.5	21.5	25.0	7.0	4.5	5.0	1.5	2.0	Did not exist	8.0	0.5
26 Apr	EMG	26.1	22.7	26.0	4.8	4.3	5.1	2.4	1.4	Did not exist	7.2	0.1
26 Apr	SWG	25.5	22.0	27.0	6.1	4.0	5.3	1.5	2.0	Did not exist	6.6	1.5
26 Apr	Demopolis	25.0	21.0	27.5						Did not exist	26.5	2.5
25 Apr	IPR	26.5	23.5	26.5	5.5	3.7	4.5		1.5	Did not exist	8.3	0.0
23 Apr	Tecnè	21.2	23.0	29.5	5.9	5.1	5.3	2.1	2.6	Did not exist	5.3	6.5
23 Apr	Ipsos	24.1	24.7	28.2	8.0	3.6	3.8	1.8	0.7	Did not exist	5.1	3.5
21 Apr	Lorien	27.3	25.4	27.6	6.2	2.3	3.7	1.5	2.7	Did not exist	3.3	0.3
19 Apr	SWG	24.0	27.0	26.8	5.8	4.2	3.2	1.2	1.9	Did not exist	5.9	0.2
18–19 Apr	EMG	29.1	20.3	27.1	4.3	4.1	5.2	2.1	1.8	Did not exist	6.0	2.0
15–19 Apr	ScenariPolitici	23.0	26.2	27.8	5.0	4.3	4.0	1.8	1.3	Did not exist	6.6	1.6
17 Apr	Piepoli	24.5	25.5	23.5	7.0	4.5	3.5	1.5	2.0	Did not exist	8.0	1.0
17 Apr	Demopolis	23.1	26.5	25.0	5.3					Did not exist	20.1	1.5
16 Apr	Ipsos	24.5	28.4	25.5	7.7	3.7	2.4	1.6	0.7	Did not exist	5.5	2.9
13 Apr	ISPO	23.7	28.6	24.5	6.5	3.9	2.7	2.0	1.9	Did not exist	6.2	4.1
12 Apr	SWG	24.0	26.8	26.9	5.6	4.5	3.2	1.0	1.8	Did not exist	6.2	0.1
11–12 Apr	EMG	23.9	26.9	25.6	5.8	3.7	3.2	1.6	2.0	Did not exist	7.3	1.3
10 Apr	Euromedia	23.7	25.7	24.7	5.4	4.5	3.5	2.1	2.2	Did not exist	8.2	1.0
9 Apr	Ipsos	24.9	28.2	25.0	7.0	3.9	2.5	1.7	0.8	Did not exist	6.0	3.2
8 Apr	ISPO	24.7	28.6	25.0	6.1	4.6	2.9	1.8	1.6	Did not exist	4.7	3.6
5 Apr	SWG	25.4	25.5	25.0	7.1	4.1	3.0	1.2	2.0	Did not exist	6.7	0.1
3–4 Apr	Lorien	25.3	26.7	26.3	7.0	3.9	2.7	1.0	2.1	Did not exist	5.0	0.4
2 Apr	Ipsos	25.1	28.4	24.8	7.1	4.0	2.7	1.8	0.7	Did not exist	5.4	3.3
29 Mar	SWG	24.8	26.0	26.2	6.8	4.3	2.9	1.0	1.9	Did not exist	6.1	0.2
27 Mar	ISPO	26.1	27.4	22.5	7.1	4.2	2.6	2.0	2.0	Did not exist	6.1	1.3
26 Mar	Piepoli	26.5	26.0	22.5	6.5	4.0	3.0	1.5	2.0	Did not exist	8.0	0.5
26 Mar	Ipsos	27.0	28.0	21.9	8.0	4.1	2.6	1.5	1.0	Did not exist	5.9	1.0
25 Mar	Tecnè	26.2	26.0	24.7	7.1	3.8	2.5	1.7	2.0	Did not exist	6.0	0.2
22 Mar	SWG	26.9	26.4	24.2	7.9	3.7	2.4	0.9	1.6	Did not exist	6.0	0.5
20 Mar	IPR	24.5	24.5	23.5	6.8	4.3	3.5	1.7	1.5	Did not exist	9.7	0.0
20 Mar	Euromedia	28.5	24.5	23.2	5.7	3.7	3.3	1.7	2.0	Did not exist	7.4	4.0
19 Mar	Ipsos	28.2	28.2	21.5	9.1	4.0	2.3	1.4	0.6	Did not exist	4.7	0.0
18 Mar	IPR	24.0	25.0	23.0	6.0	4.0	3.0			Did not exist	15.0	1.0
15 Mar	SWG	30.0	25.1	23.3	8.3	3.8	2.0	1.0	1.6	Did not exist	4.9	4.9
11–15 Mar	ScenariPolitici	25.0	27.0	23.5	7.2	4.4	3.2	1.9	1.0	Did not exist	6.8	2.0
13–14 Mar	Lorien	29.3	28.7	23.7	6.7	3.8	2.7	1.1	0.4	Did not exist	3.6	0.6
13 Mar	Piepoli	26.5	25.5	22.0	7.5	4.0	3.0	2.0	1.5	Did not exist	8.0	1.0
12 Mar	Ipsos	28.7	27.1	21.6	9.2	4.0	2.5	1.8	1.0	Did not exist	4.1	1.6
8 Mar	SWG	27.0	25.7	22.2	8.4	4.0	2.4	1.4	2.0	Did not exist	6.9	1.3
7 Mar	ISPO	28.7	26.5	21.2	7.7	4.4	3.3	1.4	1.7	Did not exist	5.1	2.2
6 Mar	Piepoli	26.5	25.5	22.0	7.0	4.0	3.0	2.0	1.5	Did not exist	8.5	1.0
5 Mar	Ipsos	29.4	26.7	22.2	8.7	3.7	2.4	1.9	1.0	Did not exist	4.0	2.7
1 Mar	Lorien	28.5	29.0	26.5	5.0	3.5	2.5	0.5	0.5	Did not exist	4.0	0.5
24–25 Feb 2013	General election	25.6	25.4	21.6	8.3	4.1	3.2	2.0	1.8	Did not exist	8.0	0.2

== Coalition vote ==
=== 2018 ===
Date	Polling firm	CSX	CDX	M5S	LeU	Others	Lead
4 Mar 2018	General election	22.8	37.0	32.7	3.4	3.1	4.3
12–16 Feb	Termometro Politico	26.3	37.5	26.3	5.3	4.6	11.2
14–15 Feb	Demopolis	27.0	38.0	28.0	6.0	1.0	10.0
14 Feb	Euromedia	26.1	38.6	26.8	5.8	2.7	11.8
13–14 Feb	Piepoli	29.3	37.0	27.0	6.0	0.2	7.7
12–14 Feb	Index	27.2	37.5	27.6	5.9	1.8	9.9
12–14 Feb	SWG	28.6	35.2	28.3	5.9	2.0	6.6
5–14 Feb	Demetra	27.4	34.7	29.4	5.3	3.2	5.3
13 Feb	IPR	28.2	38.5	28.5	4.5	0.3	10.0
13 Feb	Piepoli	29.3	37.0	27.0	6.0	0.7	7.7
12 Feb	Euromedia	26.0	38.6	27.0	6.1	2.3	11.6
8–12 Feb	Bidimedia	29.2	37.2	25.3	4.6	3.7	8.0
9–11 Feb	EMG	27.9	37.4	27.3	5.2	2.2	9.5
8–11 Feb	Lorien	27.1	36.0	27.6	5.0	4.3	8.4
8 Feb	SWG	28.5	35.6	28.0	6.5	1.4	7.1
8 Feb	Index	28.0	37.4	27.3	6.0	1.3	9.4
7–8 Feb	Demopolis	27.5	37.2	28.3	5.8	1.2	8.9
6–8 Feb	EMG	27.4	37.0	28.1	5.7	1.8	8.9
3–8 Feb	Termometro Politico	25.6	37.6	26.8	5.3	4.7	10.8
6–7 Feb	Tecnè	25.7	39.3	28.0	5.7	1.3	11.9
5–7 Feb	Ixè	26.6	35.9	28.3	6.5	2.7	7.6
5 Feb	Piepoli	29.8	36.5	27.0	6.5	0.2	6.7
2–4 Feb	EMG	27.9	37.5	27.2	5.4	2.0	9.6
1–4 Feb	Lorien	27.0	35.6	28.1	5.7	3.6	7.5
30 Jan–2 Feb	Bidimedia	29.1	35.9	26.2	5.0	3.8	6.8
22 Jan–2 Feb	Termometro Politico	26.1	36.3	26.8	5.6	5.2	9.5
30 Jan–1 Feb	EMG	28.6	37.2	26.9	5.3	2.0	8.6
29 Jan–1 Feb	Ixè	25.8	35.3	28.7	7.3	2.9	6.6
1 Feb	Euromedia	27.7	38.4	27.2	5.7	1.0	10.7
1 Feb	Piepoli	29.5	35.5	27.5	6.5	0.5	6.0
1 Feb	Index	28.3	37.3	26.9	6.3	1.2	9.0
29–31 Jan	SWG	28.1	36.2	28.4	6.0	1.5	7.8
29 Jan	Tecnè	25.9	39.0	27.8	6.2	1.1	11.2
26-28 Jan	EMG	28.7	37.5	26.5	5.7	1.6	8.8
25 Jan	Euromedia	27.8	39.1	26.4	6.0	1.0	11.3
25 Jan	Index	27.9	37.3	27.0	6.5	1.8	9.4
25 Jan	Piepoli	29.0	35.5	27.5	7.0	1.0	6.5
23-24 Jan	Ipsos	26.7	36.3	29.3	6.1	1.6	7.0
22-25 Jan	Ixè	25.4	35.4	29.2	7.0	3.0	6.2
22-24 Jan	SWG	28.1	36.7	27.8	6.4	1.0	8.6
22–23 Jan	Tecnè	26.1	39.0	27.4	6.3	1.2	11.6
22 Jan	Lorien	28.0	34.0	29.2	5.9	1.0	4.8
22 Jan	Piepoli	29.0	35.5	27.5	7.0	1.0	6.5
22 Jan	IPR	27.0	37.0	28.0	6.0	2.0	9.0
19–22 Jan	Tecnè	26.3	39.2	27.0	6.2	1.3	12.3
19–21 Jan	EMG	28.1	37.7	27.0	6.1	1.1	9.6
17–19 Jan	Ixè	26.0	35.7	27.8	7.4	3.1	7.9
16–17 Jan	Index	27.9	37.0	27.5	6.5	1.1	9.1
15–17 Jan	SWG	27.3	37.2	27.3	6.8	1.4	9.9
15 Jan	Piepoli	28.5	36.5	27.0	7.0	1.0	8.0
15 Jan	Euromedia	27.9	39.0	26.3	6.0	0.8	11.1
12–14 Jan	EMG	28.2	37.6	26.8	6.0	1.4	9.4
10–11 Jan	Demopolis	27.0	36.3	29.2	6.5	–	7.1
10–11 Jan	Ipsos	27.5	35.9	28.7	6.4	1.5	7.2
9–11 Jan	EMG	27.8	37.6	27.9	5.8	1.8	9.7
8–10 Jan	Ixè	26.5	36.3	27.8	7.0	2.4	8.5
9 Jan	IPR	27.5	38.0	28.0	5.0	1.5	10.0
8–10 Jan	Index	28.0	36.7	27.9	6.5	1.1	8.7
8–10 Jan	SWG	27.1	37.6	26.7	6.8	1.8	10.5
8 Jan	Tecnè	25.0	39.2	28.1	6.7	1.0	11.1
6–9 Jan	Bidimedia	28.4	36.0	27.0	5.9	2.7	7.6
6–8 Jan	Demopolis	26.5	36.2	29.0	7.0	1.3	7.2
5–7 Jan	EMG	28.4	36.1	28.2	5.6	1.7	7.7
6 Jan	YouTrend	27.9	34.6	27.3	6.8	3.4	6.7

=== 2017 ===
Date	Polling firm	CSX	CDX	M5S	LeU	Others	Lead
29–31 Dec	Winpoll	24.9	36.1	30.4	6.8	1.8	5.7
28 Dec	YouTrend	27.9	35.8	27.5	6.8	2.0	7.9
22 Dec	Ixè	26.0	36.6	29.0	7.3	1.1	7.6
21 Dec	YouTrend	27.9	35.8	27.3	6.8	3.2	7.9
18–20 Dec	Index	28.3	36.3	27.9	6.5	1.0	8.0
18–20 Dec	SWG	29.3	35.2	25.7	7.0	2.8	5.9
19 Dec	Euromedia	26.5	40.4	26.3	6.4	0.7	13.6
18 Dec	Piepoli	28.0	36.0	28.0	7.0	1.0	8.0
18–19 Dec	Demopolis	28.0	36.0	29.0	7.0	0.0	7.0
17–18 Dec	Tecnè	25.2	38.5	26.9	7.9	1.5	11.6
14–18 Dec	Bidimedia	29.5	34.5	26.8	6.5	2.7	5.0
14–17 Dec	EMG	28.7	36.0	28.5	5.7	1.1	7.3
14 Dec	YouTrend	28.6	35.9	27.2	5.0	2.0	7.3
12–13 Dec	Index	28.7	36.3	27.5	6.2	1.3	7.6
12–13 Dec	Ipsos	28.2	36.0	28.2	6.6	1.0	7.8
11–13 Dec	SWG	28.7	36.7	26.2	6.4	2.0	8.0
10–11 Dec	Tecnè	26.3	38.2	26.7	7.3	1.5	11.5
7–10 Dec	EMG	29.5	35.2	28.6	5.4	1.3	5.7
7–8 Dec	Euromedia	27.9	39.3	26.5	5.8	0.5	11.4
7 Dec	YouTrend	29.8	35.4	26.8	6.0	1.4	6.4
7 Dec	Piepoli	29.5	35.5	28.0	7.0	0.0	6.0
6–7 Dec	Demopolis	29.0	35.2	27.5	6.0	0.3	6.2
5–6 Dec	Index	28.7	36.4	27.5	6.2	1.2	7.7
3–4 Dec	Tecnè	26.6	38.0	26.1	7.8	1.5	11.4
1–3 Dec	EMG	30.0	35.1	28.3	5.2	1.4	5.1
30 Nov	YouTrend	29.8	35.9	27.0	5.9	1.4	6.1
28–29 Nov	Index	29.2	36.6	27.3	6.4	0.5	7.4
27–29 Nov	SWG	32.1	34.0	25.7	5.9	2.3	1.9
26 Nov	Tecnè	27.7	38.4	25.8	7.0	1.1	10.7
24–26 Nov	EMG	30.5	34.6	27.9	5.5	1.5	4.1
23 Nov	YouTrend	29.3	35.8	27.5	5.4	2.0	6.5
22 Nov	Index	29.4	36.6	27.5	6.3	0.2	7.2
20–22 Nov	SWG	32.0	33.9	26.1	6.3	1.7	1.9
17–19 Nov	EMG	30.6	34.3	28.0	6.3	0.8	3.7
17–18 Nov	Tecnè	26.5	37.4	27.4	5.4	3.3	10.0
15 Nov	Index	29.6	36.6	27.5	6.2	0.1	7.0
13–15 Nov	SWG	32.0	33.3	26.5	6.2	2.0	1.3
10–12 Nov	EMG	30.8	34.4	27.7	6.3	0.8	3.6
8 Nov	Index	29.6	36.4	27.8	6.0	0.2	6.8
6–8 Nov	SWG	33.1	34.0	25.4	6.0	1.5	0.9
4–5 Nov	EMG	31.2	33.6	28.6	6.2	0.4	2.4
31 Oct–1 Nov	Index	30.7	35.8	27.4	5.8	0.3	5.1
30 Oct–1 Nov	SWG	32.1	33.9	26.5	5.9	1.6	1.8
28–29 Oct	EMG	31.4	33.3	28.8	6.1	0.4	1.9
27 Oct	Termometro Politico	27.9	32.7	30.1	8.3	0.9	2.6
25 Oct	YouTrend	29.5	32.9	27.6	5.2	4.8	3.4
24–25 Oct	Index	30.6	36.4	27.1	5.7	5.9	5.8
23–25 Oct	SWG	33.1	33.1	27.0	5.5	1.3	0.0
21–22 Oct	EMG	31.5	33.8	28.3	5.8	0.6	2.3
17–18 Oct	Index	31.1	35.8	26.9	5.8	0.4	4.7
16–18 Oct	SWG	33.1	34.2	25.5	6.0	1.2	1.1
16 Oct	Tecnè	28.3	36.3	25.9	7.0	2.5	8.0
14–15 Oct	EMG	32.5	33.8	27.9	5.4	0.4	1.3
12 Oct	YouTrend	29.5	32.9	27.6	5.2	4.8	3.4
9–11 Oct	SWG	30.4	34.0	26.5	7.0	2.1	3.6
7–8 Oct	EMG	32.7	34.2	27.3	5.4	0.4	1.5
6–7 Oct	Tecnè	28.8	36.3	25.8	6.5	2.6	7.5
5 Oct	Lorien	31.4	30.1	31.5	7.1	0.0	0.1
2–4 Oct	SWG	30.3	34.3	25.9	8.0	1.5	4.0
29–30 Sep	Tecnè	28.5	36.4	25.5	7.2	2.4	7.9
25–27 Sep	SWG	30.3	33.1	26.5	8.1	2.0	2.8
24 Sep	Tecnè	28.1	36.3	25.7	7.6	2.4	8.2
18–20 Sep	SWG	30.0	33.6	26.8	7.7	1.9	3.6
16 Sep	Tecnè	27.9	35.8	26.4	7.4	2.5	7.9
11–13 Sep	SWG	30.2	33.4	26.8	7.9	1.7	3.2
6 Sep	Tecnè	27.8	34.1	27.6	7.7	2.8	6.3
4–6 Sep	SWG	29.7	33.7	26.8	7.6	2.2	4.0

== Seat projections ==
=== Chamber of Deputies ===
- 630 seats are available. 316 seats are needed for a majority.
- In some polls only the 618 constituencies in Italy proper are allocated, while the 12 abroad constituencies are omitted.

Date	Polling firm	CSX	CDX	M5S	LeU	Others	Lead	Majority
4 Mar 2018	General election	122	265	227	14	2	38	–51
15 Feb 2018	Index	151	295	147	25	–	144	–21
14 Feb 2018	Euromedia	156	273	134	26	28	117	–43
13–14 Feb 2018	Piepoli	166	281	145	26	–	115	–35
12–14 Feb	Ixè	123–141	264–297	132–182	24	4–69	82–165	–52 to –19
8 Feb 2018	Index	156	294	143	25	–	138	–22
7 Feb 2018	Ixè	143	296	161	26	4	135	–20
2 Feb 2018	YouTrend**	153	284	156	25	–	128	–32
29 Jan–1 Feb 2018	Ixè	134	290	172	30	4	118	–26
25 Jan 2018	Piepoli	162	268	159	29	–	106	–48
25 Jan 2018	YouTrend**	147	288	155	28	–	133	–28
22-25 Jan 2018	Ixè	130	290	177	29	4	113	–26
19-21 Jan 2018	EMG	136–176	259–299	139–179	22–26	–	120	–17
17-19 Jan 2018	Ixè	137	299	161	29	4	138	–17
18 Jan 2018	Ipsos	154	266	170	27	–	96	–50
10–11 Jan 2018	Ipsos	152	269	169	27	–	100	–47
6 Jan 2018	YouTrend	187	265	140	26	–	78	–51
1 Jan 2018	YouTrend	158	280	157	28	7	122	–36
29–31 Dec 2017	Winpoll	134	276	179	30	–	97	–40
22 Dec 2017	Ixè	138	292	167	29	4	125	–24
21 Dec 2017	YouTrend	187	265	140	26	–	78	–51
19 Dec 2017	Ipos	151	281	158	27	–	123	–35
30 Nov 2017	YouTrend	169	267	153	24	4	98	–49
23 Nov 2017	Ixè	162	270	165	25	8	105	–46
8 Nov 2017	Ipos	164	252	173	23	4	79	–64
27 Oct 2017	Ipos	162	248	178	25	4	70	–68
25 Oct 2017	YouTrend	182	221	189	22	4	32	–95
24–25 Oct 2017	Demopolis	180	246	168	24	–	66	–70
20 Oct 2017	Index	181	261	172	16	—N/a	80	–55
18 Oct 2017	Cattaneo	213	209	170	26	–	4	–103
12 Oct 2017	Ipos	174	238	178	23	4	60	–78
12 Oct 2017	YouTrend	182	221	189	22	4	32	–95

=== Senate of the Republic ===
- 315 seats are available, plus 6 senators for life. 161 seats are needed for a majority.
- In some polls only the 309 constituencies in Italy proper are allocated, while the 6 abroad constituencies are omitted.

Date	Polling firm	CSX	CDX	M5S	LeU	Others	Lead	Majority
4 Mar 2018	General election	60	137	112	4	2	25	–24
13–14 Feb 2018	Piepoli	92	134	72	11	–	42	–27
7 Feb 2018	Ixè	68	153	80	12	2	73	–8
1 Feb 2018	YouTrend	77	140	80	12	–	60	–21
29 Jan–1 Feb 2018	Ixè	65	150	84	14	2	66	–11
25 Jan 2018	YouTrend	79	140	77	13	–	61	–21
22-25 Jan 2018	Ixè	61	152	87	13	2	65	–9
17-19 Jan 2018	Ixè	65	153	82	13	2	71	–8
6 Jan 2018	YouTrend	80	137	78	14	6	57	–24
1 Jan 2018	YouTrend	82	133	79	15	6	51	–28
29–31 Dec 2017	Winpoll	71	138	87	13	–	51	–23
22 Dec 2017	Ixè	68	151	83	11	2	58	–10
23 Nov 2017	Ixè	81	135	85	8	6	40	–26
