= Elections in Marche =

Elections in Italian region

This page gathers the results of elections in Marche.

== Regional elections ==
=== Latest regional election ===
In the latest regional election, which took place on 28–29 September 2025, incumbent president Francesco Acquaroli of the Brothers of Italy (FdI) was re-elected by beating Matteo Ricci of the Democratic Party (PD). FdI was the largest party, followed by the PD, Forza Italia and Lega Marche, the latter two part of the centre-right coalition led by FdI.

28–29 September 2025 Marche regional election results
Candidates	Votes	%	Seats	Parties	Votes	%	Seats
Francesco Acquaroli	337,679	52.43	1	Brothers of Italy	155,540	27.41	10
Francesco Acquaroli	337,679	52.43	1	Forza Italia	48,823	8.60	3
Francesco Acquaroli	337,679	52.43	1	Lega Marche	41,805	7.37	3
Francesco Acquaroli	337,679	52.43	1	Marchigiani for Acquaroli President	24,104	4.25	1
Francesco Acquaroli	337,679	52.43	1	Civics for Acquaroli President	14,680	2.59	1
Francesco Acquaroli	337,679	52.43	1	Union of the Centre	10,853	1.91	1
Francesco Acquaroli	337,679	52.43	1	Us Moderates	9,299	1.64	–
Francesco Acquaroli	337,679	52.43	1	Total	305,104	53.77	19
Matteo Ricci	286,209	44.44	1 (0) (Note: Ricci chose not to take his seat)	Democratic Party	127,638	22.50	6
Matteo Ricci	286,209	44.44	1 (0)	Civic List Ricci for President	41,650	7.34	2
Matteo Ricci	286,209	44.44	1 (0)	Five Star Movement	28,836	5.08	1
Matteo Ricci	286,209	44.44	1 (0)	Greens and Left Alliance	23,565	4.15	1
Matteo Ricci	286,209	44.44	1 (0)	Marche Alive Project	10,872	1.92	– (1) (Note: Gained a seat after Matteo Ricci chose not to take his seat)
Matteo Ricci	286,209	44.44	1 (0)	Civic Project Forward with Ricci	8,100	1.43	–
Matteo Ricci	286,209	44.44	1 (0)	Peace Health Work	6,392	1.13	–
Matteo Ricci	286,209	44.44	1 (0)	Total	247,053	43.54	10 (11) (Note: Gained a seat after Matteo Ricci chose not to take his seat)
Beatrice Marinelli	6,302	0.98	–	Evolution of the Revolution	4,867	0.86	–
Lidia Mangani	5,039	0.78	–	Italian Communist Party	3,388	0.60	–
Claudio Bolletta	4,851	0.75	–	Sovereign Popular Democracy	3,953	0.70	–
Francesco Gerardi	3,916	0.61	–	Force of the People	3,037	0.54	–
Blank and invalid votes	–	–					
Total candidates	643,996	100.00	2 (1) (Note: Ricci chose not to take his seat)	Total parties	567,402	100.00	29
Registered voters/turnout	–	50.01					
Source: Marche Region – Results

=== List of previous regional elections ===
- 1970 Marche regional election
- 1975 Marche regional election
- 1980 Marche regional election
- 1985 Marche regional election
- 1990 Marche regional election
- 1995 Marche regional election
- 2000 Marche regional election
- 2005 Marche regional election
- 2010 Marche regional election
- 2015 Marche regional election
- 2020 Marche regional election
