= List of presidents of Marche =

The president of Marche serves as the head of government of the Italian region of Marche. The current president is Francesco Acquaroli of Brothers of Italy, who has held the office since September 2020.

== List of presidents of Marche ==
President		Term of office		Party	Coalition	Administration	Legislature
Presidents elected by the Regional Council of Marche (1970–1995)
1	Giuseppe Serrini (1917–1994)	1 August 1970	19 December 1972	DC	DC • PSI • PSDI • PRI	Serrini	I (1970)
2	Dino Tiberi (1923–2013)	19 December 1972	10 September 1975	DC	DC • PSI • PSDI • PRI	Tiberi	I (1970)
3	Adriano Ciaffi (b. 1936)	10 September 1975	7 September 1978	DC	DC • PSI • PSDI • PRI	Ciaffi	II (1975)
4	Emidio Massi (1922–2016)	7 September 1978	18 November 1980	PSI	DC • PSI • PSDI • PRI	Massi I	II (1975)
4	Emidio Massi (1922–2016)	18 November 1980	21 October 1985	PSI	DC • PSI • PSDI • PRI	Massi II	III (1980)
4	Emidio Massi (1922–2016)	21 October 1985	22 July 1990	PSI	DC • PSI • PSDI • PRI	Massi III	IV (1985)
5	Rodolfo Giampaoli (1939–2026)	22 July 1990	29 July 1993	DC	DC • PSI • PSDI • PRI	Gianpaoli	V (1990)
6	Gaetano Recchi (1934–2023)	29 July 1993	19 June 1995	PSI	DC • PSI • FdV	Recchi	V (1990)
Directly-elected presidents (since 1995)
7	Vito D'Ambrosio (b. 1943)	19 June 1995	17 April 2000	PDS; DS	PDS • PRC • FdV	D'Ambrosio I	VI (1995)
7	Vito D'Ambrosio (b. 1943)	17 April 2000	5 April 2005	PDS; DS	DS • PRC • PPI • FdV	D'Ambrosio II	VII (2000)
8	Gian Mario Spacca (b. 1953)	5 April 2005	30 March 2010	DL; PD	DS • DL • PRC • FdV • PdCI	Spacca I	VIII (2005)
8	Gian Mario Spacca (b. 1953)	30 March 2010	12 June 2015	DL; PD	PD • IdV • UDC • FdV	Spacca II	IX (2010)
9	Luca Ceriscioli (b. 1966)	12 June 2015	30 September 2020	PD	PD • IdV • UDC • FdV • PSI	Ceriscioli	X (2015)
10	Francesco Acquaroli (b. 1974)	30 September 2020	29 September 2025	FdI	League • FdI • FI	Acquaroli I	XI (2020)
10	Francesco Acquaroli (b. 1974)	30 September 2025	In office	FdI	League • FdI • FI	Acquaroli II	XII (2025)
