= Politics of Marche =

Politics in an Italian region

The politics of Marche, a region of Italy, takes place in the framework of an "anomalous presidential" representative democracy or prime-ministerial system with an executive presidency, whereby the President of the Region is the head of government, and of a pluriform multi-party system. Legislative power is vested in the Regional Council, while executive power is exercised by the Regional Government led by the President, who is directly elected by the people. The current Statute, which regulates the functioning of the regional institutions, has been in force since 2004.

Prior to the rise of Fascism, most of the deputies elected in Marche were part of the liberal establishment (see Historical Right, Historical Left and Liberals), which governed Italy for decades. The region, especially its northern part (largely inhabited by Romagnoli), was also a stronghold of the Italian Republican Party. In the 1919 general election Marche was one of the regions in which the Italian People's Party, while in the 1924 general election the National Fascist Party took more than 60%.

After World War II Marche was an early stronghold of Christian Democracy and later one of the few regions where the Christian Democrats and the Italian Communist Party were close in terms of the popular vote. However, from 1970 to 1995 the Italian Socialist Party teamed up with the Christian Democrats and long held the presidency, leaving the Communists out of the regional government. Since 1995 the region has been a stronghold of the post-Communist parties, from the Democratic Party of the Left to the present-day Democratic Party, and became part of the so-called "Red belt", along with Emilia-Romagna, Tuscany and Umbria.

== Executive branch ==
The Regional Government (Giunta Regionale) is presided by the President of the Region (Presidente della Regione), who is elected for a five-year term, and is composed by the President and the Ministers (Assessori), who cannot be more than ten, including a vice president.

=== List of presidents ===
President		Term of office		Party	Coalition	Administration	Legislature
Presidents elected by the Regional Council of Marche (1970–1995)
1	Giuseppe Serrini (1917–1994)	1 August 1970	19 December 1972	DC	DC • PSI • PSDI • PRI	Serrini	I (1970)
2	Dino Tiberi (1923–2013)	19 December 1972	10 September 1975	DC	DC • PSI • PSDI • PRI	Tiberi	I (1970)
3	Adriano Ciaffi (b. 1936)	10 September 1975	7 September 1978	DC	DC • PSI • PSDI • PRI	Ciaffi	II (1975)
4	Emidio Massi (1922–2016)	7 September 1978	18 November 1980	PSI	DC • PSI • PSDI • PRI	Massi I	II (1975)
4	Emidio Massi (1922–2016)	18 November 1980	21 October 1985	PSI	DC • PSI • PSDI • PRI	Massi II	III (1980)
4	Emidio Massi (1922–2016)	21 October 1985	22 July 1990	PSI	DC • PSI • PSDI • PRI	Massi III	IV (1985)
5	Rodolfo Giampaoli (1939–2026)	22 July 1990	29 July 1993	DC	DC • PSI • PSDI • PRI	Gianpaoli	V (1990)
6	Gaetano Recchi (1934–2023)	29 July 1993	19 June 1995	PSI	DC • PSI • FdV	Recchi	V (1990)
Directly-elected presidents (since 1995)
7	Vito D'Ambrosio (b. 1943)	19 June 1995	17 April 2000	PDS; DS	PDS • PRC • FdV	D'Ambrosio I	VI (1995)
7	Vito D'Ambrosio (b. 1943)	17 April 2000	5 April 2005	PDS; DS	DS • PRC • PPI • FdV	D'Ambrosio II	VII (2000)
8	Gian Mario Spacca (b. 1953)	5 April 2005	30 March 2010	DL; PD	DS • DL • PRC • FdV • PdCI	Spacca I	VIII (2005)
8	Gian Mario Spacca (b. 1953)	30 March 2010	12 June 2015	DL; PD	PD • IdV • UDC • FdV	Spacca II	IX (2010)
9	Luca Ceriscioli (b. 1966)	12 June 2015	30 September 2020	PD	PD • IdV • UDC • FdV • PSI	Ceriscioli	X (2015)
10	Francesco Acquaroli (b. 1974)	30 September 2020	29 September 2025	FdI	League • FdI • FI	Acquaroli I	XI (2020)
10	Francesco Acquaroli (b. 1974)	30 September 2025	In office	FdI	League • FdI • FI	Acquaroli II	XII (2025)

== Legislative branch ==
The Regional Legislative Assembly of Marche (Assemblea Legislativa Regionale delle Marche) is composed of 40 members. 32 councillors are elected in provincial constituencies by proportional representation using the largest remainder method with a Droop quota and open lists, while 8 councillors (elected in bloc) come from a "regional list", including the President-elect. One seat is reserved for the candidate who comes second. If a coalition wins more than 50% of the total seats in the Council with PR, only 4 candidates from the regional list will be chosen and the number of those elected in provincial constituencies will be 36. If the winning coalition receives less than 40% of votes special seats are added to the Council to ensure a large majority for the President's coalition.

The Council is elected for a five-year term, but, if the President suffers a vote of no confidence, resigns or dies, under the simul stabunt, simul cadent clause introduced in 1999 (literally they will stand together or they will fall together), also the Council is dissolved and a snap election is called.

=== Current composition ===
The Regional Council of Marche is currently composed of the following political groups:

Party	Seats	Status
Brothers of Italy (FdI)	11 / 31	In government
Democratic Party (PD)	7 / 31	In opposition
Lega	3 / 31	In government
Forza Italia (FI)	3 / 31	In government
Ricci for President	2 / 31	In opposition
Five Star Movement (M5S)	1 / 31	In opposition
Marchigiani for Acquaroli for President (MAP)	1 / 31	In government
Civics Marche	1 / 31	In government
Union of the Centre (UDC)	1 / 31	In government
Greens and Left Alliance (AVS)	1 / 31	In opposition

By coalition:

Coalition	Seats	Status
Centre-right coalition	20 / 31	Government
Centre-left coalition	11 / 31	Opposition

== Local government ==
=== Provinces ===
Province	Inhabitants	President	Party	Election
Ancona (list)	482,886	Daniele Carnevali	PSI	2021
Pesaro and Urbino (list)	364,896	Alberto Alessandri	Ind. (centre-right)	2026
Macerata (list)	324,188	Alessandro Gentilucci	FdI	2026
Ascoli Piceno (list)	214,014	Fabio Salvi	Ind. (centre-right)	2026
Fermo (list)	177,993	Michele Ortenzi	Ind. (centre-right)	2021

=== Municipalities ===
Provincial capitals

Municipality	Inhabitants	Mayor	Party	Election
Ancona	102,500	Daniele Silvetti	Forza Italia	2023
Ascoli Piceno	51,168	Marco Fioravanti	Brothers of Italy	2019
Fermo	37,869	Paolo Calcinaro	Civic list	2020
Macerata	43,000	Sandro Parcaroli	Lega Nord	2020
Pesaro	98,438	Andrea Biancani	Democratic Party	2024

Other municipalities

Municipality	Inhabitants	Mayor	Party	Election
Fano	63,922	Luca Serfilippi	Lega	2024
San Benedetto del Tronto	48,036	Antonio Spazzafumo	Civic list	2021
Senigallia	44,673	Massimo Olivetti	Independent (centre-right)	2020
Jesi	40,502	Lorenzo Fiordelmondo	Democratic Party	2022
Civitanova Marche	40,400	Fabrizio Ciarapica	Forza Italia	2017
Urbino	15,501	Maurizio Gambini	Independent (centre-right)	2014

== Parties and elections ==
=== Latest regional election ===
In the latest regional election, which took place on 28–29 September 2025, incumbent president Francesco Acquaroli of the Brothers of Italy (FdI) was re-elected by beating Matteo Ricci of the Democratic Party (PD). FdI was the largest party, followed by the PD, Forza Italia and Lega Marche, the latter two part of the centre-right coalition led by FdI.

28–29 September 2025 Marche regional election results
Candidates	Votes	%	Seats	Parties	Votes	%	Seats
Francesco Acquaroli	337,679	52.43	1	Brothers of Italy	155,540	27.41	10
Francesco Acquaroli	337,679	52.43	1	Forza Italia	48,823	8.60	3
Francesco Acquaroli	337,679	52.43	1	Lega Marche	41,805	7.37	3
Francesco Acquaroli	337,679	52.43	1	Marchigiani for Acquaroli President	24,104	4.25	1
Francesco Acquaroli	337,679	52.43	1	Civics for Acquaroli President	14,680	2.59	1
Francesco Acquaroli	337,679	52.43	1	Union of the Centre	10,853	1.91	1
Francesco Acquaroli	337,679	52.43	1	Us Moderates	9,299	1.64	–
Francesco Acquaroli	337,679	52.43	1	Total	305,104	53.77	19
Matteo Ricci	286,209	44.44	1 (0) (Note: Ricci chose not to take his seat)	Democratic Party	127,638	22.50	6
Matteo Ricci	286,209	44.44	1 (0)	Civic List Ricci for President	41,650	7.34	2
Matteo Ricci	286,209	44.44	1 (0)	Five Star Movement	28,836	5.08	1
Matteo Ricci	286,209	44.44	1 (0)	Greens and Left Alliance	23,565	4.15	1
Matteo Ricci	286,209	44.44	1 (0)	Marche Alive Project	10,872	1.92	– (1) (Note: Gained a seat after Matteo Ricci chose not to take his seat)
Matteo Ricci	286,209	44.44	1 (0)	Civic Project Forward with Ricci	8,100	1.43	–
Matteo Ricci	286,209	44.44	1 (0)	Peace Health Work	6,392	1.13	–
Matteo Ricci	286,209	44.44	1 (0)	Total	247,053	43.54	10 (11) (Note: Gained a seat after Matteo Ricci chose not to take his seat)
Beatrice Marinelli	6,302	0.98	–	Evolution of the Revolution	4,867	0.86	–
Lidia Mangani	5,039	0.78	–	Italian Communist Party	3,388	0.60	–
Claudio Bolletta	4,851	0.75	–	Sovereign Popular Democracy	3,953	0.70	–
Francesco Gerardi	3,916	0.61	–	Force of the People	3,037	0.54	–
Blank and invalid votes	–	–					
Total candidates	643,996	100.00	2 (1) (Note: Ricci chose not to take his seat)	Total parties	567,402	100.00	29
Registered voters/turnout	–	50.01					
Source: Marche Region – Results
