= Regional Council of Marche =

Legislative organ of Marche, Italy

Regional Council of Marche Consiglio regionale delle Marche
- 12th Legislature

Type
- Type: Regional council Unicameral
- Established: 6 July 1970

Leadership
- President: Gianluca Pasqui, FI since 27 October 2025

Structure
- Seats: 31
- Political groups: Government (20): FdI (11); Lega (3); FI (3); UDC (1); MAP (1); Civics Marche (1); Opposition (11): PD (7); Ricci List (2); M5S (1); AVS (1)
- Length of term: 5 years

Elections
- Voting system: Party-list semi-proportional representation with majority bonus D'Hondt method
- Last election: 28–29 September 2025

Meeting place
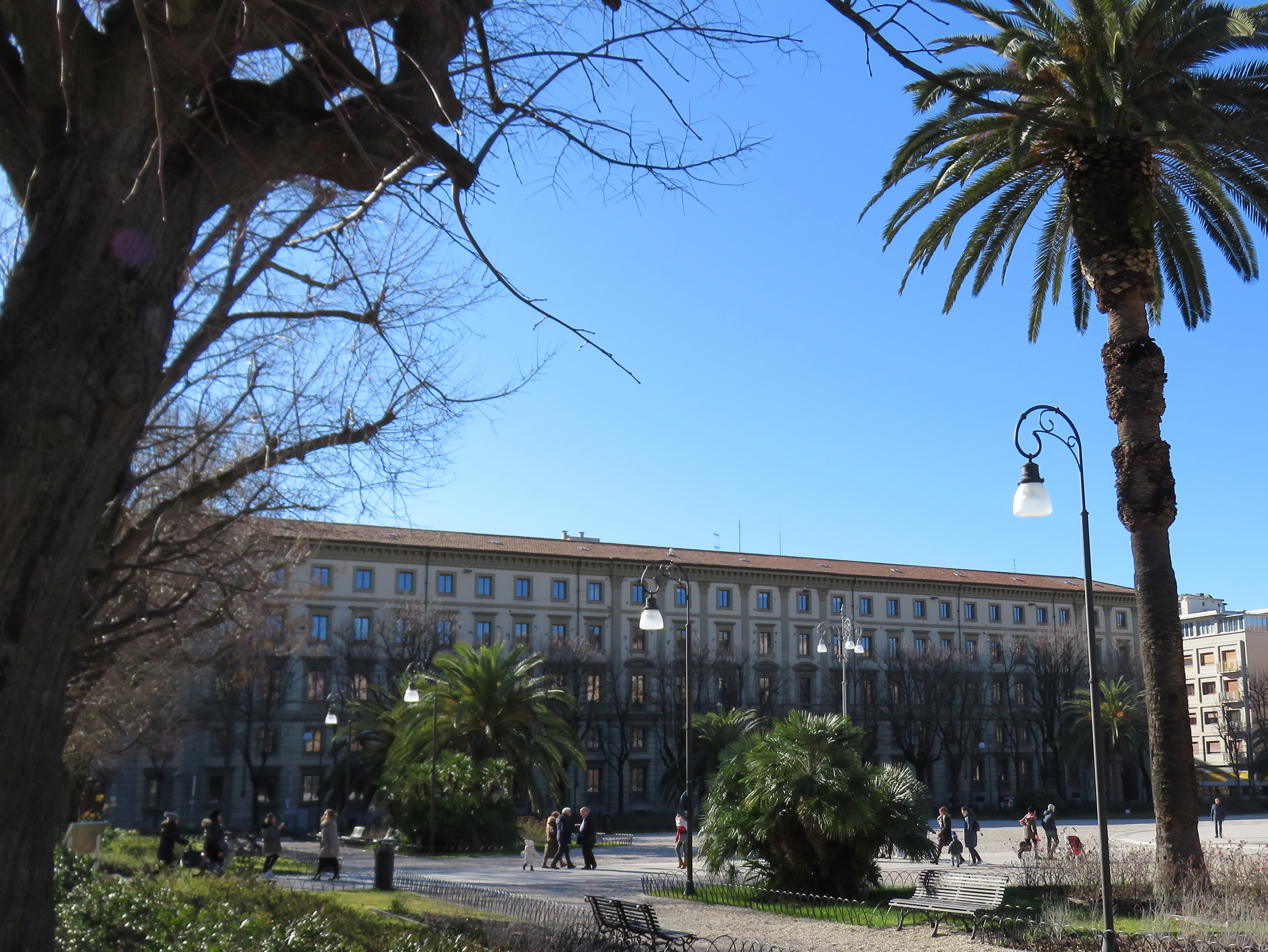
- Palazzo delle Marche, Ancona

Website
- consiglio.marche.it

The Regional Council of Marche (Italian: Consiglio regionale delle Marche) is the regional council, hence the regional legislative authority, of Marche. It changed its name into "Legislative Assembly" in 2004.

It was first elected in 1970, when the ordinary regions were instituted, on the basis of the Constitution of Italy of 1948.

== Composition ==
The Regional Council of Marche is composed of 31 members, of which 29 are elected in provincial constituencies with proportional representation, one is for the candidate for President who comes second, who usually becomes the leader of the opposition in the Council, and one is for the elected president.

The Council is elected for a five-year term, but, if the President suffers a vote of no confidence, resigns or dies, under the simul stabunt vel simul cadent clause (introduced in 1999), also the Council will be dissolved and there will be a snap election.

The Council was originally composed of 40 regional councillors. Following the decree-law n. 138 of 13 August 2011, the number of regional councillors was reduced to 30, with an additional seat reserved for the President of the Region.

=== Political groups (2025–2030) ===
The Regional Council of Marche is currently composed of the following political groups:

| Party | Seats | Status |
|---|---|---|
| Brothers of Italy (FdI) | 11 / 31 | In government |
| Democratic Party (PD) | 7 / 31 | In opposition |
| Lega | 3 / 31 | In government |
| Forza Italia (FI) | 3 / 31 | In government |
| Ricci for President | 2 / 31 | In opposition |
| Five Star Movement (M5S) | 1 / 31 | In opposition |
| Marchigiani for Acquaroli for President (MAP) | 1 / 31 | In government |
| Civics Marche | 1 / 31 | In government |
| Union of the Centre (UDC) | 1 / 31 | In government |
| Greens and Left Alliance (AVS) | 1 / 31 | In opposition |

By coalition:

| Coalition | Seats | Status |
|---|---|---|
| Centre-right coalition | 20 / 31 | Government |
| Centre-left coalition | 11 / 31 | Opposition |

=== Historical composition ===
| Election | DC | PCI | PSI | PLI | PRI | PSDI | MSI | Others | Total |
|---|---|---|---|---|---|---|---|---|---|
| 7 June 1970 | 17 | 14 | 3 | 1 | 1 | 2 | 1 | 1 | 40 |
| 15 June 1975 | 16 | 15 | 4 | - | 1 | 2 | 1 | 1 | 40 |
| 8 June 1980 | 16 | 15 | 4 | 1 | 1 | 1 | 1 | 1 | 40 |
| 12 May 1985 | 15 | 15 | 4 | 1 | 1 | 1 | 2 | 1 | 40 |
| 6 May 1990 | 15 | 13 | 5 | 1 | 1 | 1 | 1 | 3 | 40 |

| Election | Majority | Opposition | Council | President of the Region |
|---|---|---|---|---|
| 23 April 1995 | Centre-left (The Olive Tree) 26 / 40 | Centre-right (Pole for Freedoms) 12 / 40 PPI 2 / 40 | | Vito D'Ambrosio (1995–2005) |
| 16 April 2000 | Centre-left (The Olive Tree) 24 / 40 | Centre-right (House of Freedoms) 16 / 40 | | Vito D'Ambrosio (1995–2005) |
| 3 April 2005 | Centre-left (The Union) 24 / 40 | Centre-right (House of Freedoms) 16 / 40 | | Gian Mario Spacca (2005–2015) |
| 28 March 2010 | Centre-left 26 / 43 | Centre-right 15 / 43 FdS 2 / 43 | | Gian Mario Spacca (2005–2015) |
| 31 May 2015 | Centre-left 19 / 31 | M5S 5 / 31 Lega–FdI 4 / 31 FI–NCD 3 / 31 | | Luca Ceriscioli (2015–2020) |
| 20 September 2020 | Centre-right 20 / 31 | Centre-left 9 / 31 M5S 2 / 31 | | Francesco Acquaroli (since 2020) |
| 28 September 2025 | Centre-right 20 / 31 | Centre-left 11 / 31 | | Francesco Acquaroli (since 2020) |

== Presidents ==
This is a list of the Presidents of the Regional Council (Italian: Presidenti dell'Consiglio Regionale):

| Name | Period | | Regional Legislature |
|---|---|---|---|
| Walter Tulli (DC) | 6 July 1970 | 14 July 1975 | I (1970) |
| Renato Bastianelli (PCI) | 14 July 1975 | 24 July 1980 | II (1975) |
| Elio Capodaglio (PSI) | 24 July 1980 | 18 November 1980 | III (1980) |
| Rodolfo Giampaoli (DC) | 18 November 1980 | 31 July 1985 | III (1980) |
| Rodolfo Giampaoli (DC) | 31 July 1985 | 10 July 1990 | IV (1985) |
| Giancarlo Scriboni (PSI) | 10 July 1990 | 10 November 1992 | V (1990) |
| Alighiero Nuciari (PLI) | 10 November 1992 | 13 November 1994 | V (1990) |
| Franco Paoletti (PPI) | 13 November 1994 | 12 June 1995 | V (1990) |
| Silvana Amati (PDS) | 12 June 1995 | 29 May 2000 | VI (1995) |
| Luigi Minardi (DS) | 29 May 2000 | 2 May 2005 | VII (2000) |
| Luigi Minardi (DS) | 2 May 2005 | 24 July 2006 | VIII (2005) |
| Raffaele Bucciarelli (FdS) | 24 July 2006 | 19 April 2010 | VIII (2005) |
| Vittoriano Solazzi (PD) | 19 April 2010 | 22 June 2015 | IX (2010) |
| Antonio Mastrovincenzo (PD) | 22 June 2015 | 19 October 2020 | X (2015) |
| Dino Latini (UDC) | 19 October 2020 | 27 October 2025 | XI (2020) |
| Gianluca Pasqui (FI) | 27 October 2025 | Incumbent | XII (2025) |

== See also ==
- Regional council
- Politics of Marche
- President of Marche
