= Electoral history of Italian political parties =

Elections in Italy are held at least at four levels: European Parliament, Italian Parliament (composed of the Chamber of Deputies and the Senate of the Republic), Regional Councils and municipal councils. Several political parties compete and have different results, depending on elections.

The electoral results of the current main political parties, since their establishment, are displayed in this article.

== Brothers of Italy ==
=== Italian Parliament ===
Chamber of Deputies
Election year	Votes	%	Seats	+/−	Leader
2013	666,035 (8th)	2.0	9 / 630	–	Giorgia Meloni
2018	1,429,550 (5th)	4.4	32 / 630	▲23	Giorgia Meloni
2022	8,577,300 (1st)	26.4	119 / 400	▲87	Giorgia Meloni

Senate of the Republic
Election year	Votes	%	Seats	+/−	Leader
2013	590,083 (7th)	1.9	0 / 315	–	Giorgia Meloni
2018	1,286,606 (5th)	4.3	18 / 315	▲18	Giorgia Meloni
2022	7,779,478 (1st)	26.0	66 / 200	▲48	Giorgia Meloni

=== European Parliament ===
European Parliament
Election year	Votes	%	Seats	+/−	Leader
2014	1,004,037 (7th)	3.7	0 / 73	–	Giorgia Meloni
2019	1,726,189 (5th)	6.4	6 / 76	▲6	Giorgia Meloni
2024	6,732,303 (1st)	28.8	24 / 76	▲18	Giorgia Meloni

=== Regional Councils ===
Region	Election year	Votes	%	Seats	+/−
Aosta Valley	2018	1,862 (10th) (Note: In a joint list with Forza Italia.)	2.9	0 / 35	–
Aosta Valley	2020	3,761 (7th) (Note: In a joint list with Forza Italia.)	5.7	0 / 35	0
Piedmont	2014	72,776 (6th)	3.7	1 / 51	–
Piedmont	2019	105,410 (5th)	5.5	2 / 51	▲1
Lombardy	2013	83,810 (10th)	1.6	2 / 80	–
Lombardy	2018	190,804 (9th)	3.6	3 / 80	▲1
Lombardy	2023	725,402 (1st)	25.2	22 / 80	▲19
South Tyrol	2018	4,883(9th) (Note: In a joint list with Alto Adige in the Heart.)	1.7	1 / 35	–
Trentino	2018	3,686 (15th)	1.4	0 / 35	–
Veneto	2015	48,163 (9th)	3.6	1 / 51	–
Veneto	2020	196,310 (4th)	9.5	5 / 51	▲4
Friuli-Venezia Giulia	2018	23,183 (6th)	5.5	2 / 49	–
Emilia-Romagna	2014	23,052 (8th)	1.9	1 / 50	–
Emilia-Romagna	2020	185,796 (3rd)	8.6	3 / 50	▲2
Liguria	2015	16,525 (6th)	3.1	1 / 50	–
Liguria	2020	68,062 (4th)	10.9	3 / 50	▲2
Tuscany	2015	51,152 (6th)	3.9	1 / 41	–
Tuscany	2020	219,165 (3rd)	13.5	4 / 41	▲3
Marche	2015	34,538 (5th)	6.5	1 / 31	–
Marche	2020	116,231 (3rd)	18.7	8 / 31	▲7
Umbria	2015	21,931 (5th)	6.2	1 / 21	–
Umbria	2019	43,443 (3rd)	10.4	2 / 21	▲1
Lazio	2013	107,731 (6th)	3.8	1 / 50	–
Lazio	2018	220,460 (5th)	8.7	3 / 50	▲2
Lazio	2023	519,633 (1st)	33.6	22 / 50	▲19
Abruzzo	2014	19,548 (8th)	2.9	0 / 31	–
Abruzzo	2019	38,894 (5th)	6.5	3 / 31	▲3
Molise	2018	6,461 (5th)	4.5	1 / 21	–
Campania	2015	124,499 (6th)	5.5	2 / 51	–
Campania	2020	140,918 (5th)	6.0	4 / 51	▲2
Apulia	2015	39,164 (10th)	2.3	0 / 51	–
Apulia	2020	211,693 (2nd)	12.6	7 / 51	▲7
Basilicata	2013	12,033 (8th)	5.1	1 / 21	–
Basilicata	2019	17,112 (6th)	5.9	1 / 21	–
Calabria	2014	19,353 (13th)	2.5	0 / 30	–
Calabria	2020	84,507 (4th)	10.9	4 / 31	▲4
Sicily	2017	108,713 (7th) (Note: In a joint list with Us with Salvini.)	5.7	3 / 70	–
Sicily	2022	282,345 (1st)	15.1	11 / 70	▲8
Sardinia	2014	19,275 (8th)	2.8	1 / 60	–
Sardinia	2019	33,423 (7th)	4.7	3 / 60	▲2

== Democratic Party ==
=== Italian Parliament ===
Chamber of Deputies
Election year	Votes	%	Seats	+/−	Leader
2008	12,434,260 (2nd)	33.1	217 / 630	–	Walter Veltroni
2013	8,934,009 (1st)	25.5	297 / 630	▲80	Pier Luigi Bersani
2018	6,161,896 (2nd)	18.8	112 / 630	▼185	Matteo Renzi

Senate of the Republic
Election year	Votes	%	Seats	+/−	Leader
2008	11,052,577 (2nd)	33.1	118 / 315	–	Walter Veltroni
2013	8,400,255 (1st)	27.4	112 / 315	▼6	Pier Luigi Bersani
2018	5,783,360 (2nd)	19.1	54 / 315	▼58	Matteo Renzi

=== European Parliament ===
European Parliament
Election year	Votes	%	Seats	+/−	Leader
2009	8,008,203 (2nd)	26.1	21 / 72	–	Dario Franceschini
2014	11,203,231 (1st)	40.8	31 / 73	▲10	Matteo Renzi
2019	6,089,853 (2nd)	22.7	19 / 76	▼12	Nicola Zingaretti

=== Regional Councils ===
Region	Election year	Votes	%	Seats	+/−
Aosta Valley	2008	6,841	9.3	3 / 35	–
Aosta Valley	2013	6,401	8.9	3 / 35	0
Aosta Valley	2018	3,436 (9th)	5.4	0 / 35	▼3
Aosta Valley	2020	10,106 (3rd)	15.2	7 / 35	▲7
Piedmont	2010	439,663	23.2	13 / 60	–
Piedmont	2014	704,541	36.2	27 / 51	▲14
Piedmont	2019	430,902 (2nd)	22.4	10 / 51	▼17
Lombardy	2010	976,215	22.9	21 / 80	▼1
Lombardy	2013	1,369,440	25.3	17 / 80	▼4
Lombardy	2018	1,008,496 (2nd)	19.2	16 / 80	▼1
Lombardy	2023	628,774 (2nd)	21.8	18 / 80	▲2
South Tyrol	2008	18,139	6.0	2 / 35	–
South Tyrol	2013	19,207	6.7	2 / 35	0
South Tyrol	2018	10,806 (7th)	3.8	1 / 35	▼1
Trentino	2008	59,219	21.6	8 / 35	–
Trentino	2013	52,412	22.1	9 / 35	▼1
Trentino	2018	35,530 (2nd)	13.9	5 / 35	▼2
Veneto	2010	456,309	20.3	14 / 60	–
Veneto	2015	308,438 (3rd)	16.7	9 / 51	▼6
Veneto	2020	244,881 (3rd)	12.0	6 / 51	▼3
Friuli-Venezia Giulia	2008	169,597	29.9	15 / 59	▼10
Friuli-Venezia Giulia	2013	107,155	26.8	20 / 49	▲5
Friuli-Venezia Giulia	2018	76,423 (2nd)	18.1	10 / 49	▼10
Emilia-Romagna	2010	857,613	40.7	28 / 50	–
Emilia-Romagna	2014	535,109 (1st)	44.5	30 / 50	▲2
Emilia-Romagna	2020	749,976 (1st)	34.7	23 / 50	▼7
Liguria	2010	211,500	28.4	18 / 40	–
Liguria	2015	138,190 (1st)	25.6	8 / 31	▼10
Liguria	2020	124,586 (2nd)	19.9	6 / 31	▼2
Tuscany	2010	641,214	42.2	24 / 53	–
Tuscany	2015	614,869 (1st)	46.3	25 / 41	▲1
Tuscany	2020	563,116 (1st)	34.7	23 / 41	▼2
Marche	2010	224,897	31.1	15 / 42	–
Marche	2015	186,357 (1st)	35.8	16 / 31	▲1
Marche	2020	156,394 (1st)	25.1	8 / 31	▼8
Umbria	2010	149,219	36.2	15 / 40	–
Umbria	2015	125,777	35.8	11 / 21	▼4
Umbria	2019	93,296 (2nd)	22.3	5 / 21	▼6
Lazio	2010	645,187	26.3	15 / 61	–
Lazio	2013	834,286	29.7	24 / 51	▲9
Lazio	2018	539,131 (2nd)	21.2	18 / 51	▼6
Lazio	2023	313,023 (2nd)	20.3	10 / 51	▼8
Abruzzo	2008	106,410	19.6	7 / 45	–
Abruzzo	2014	171,095	25.4	11 / 31	▲4
Abruzzo	2019	66,796 (3rd)	11.1	4 / 31	▼7
Molise	2011	17,735	9.9	4 / 30	–
Molise	2013	24,892	14.8	3 / 21	▼1
Molise	2018	13,122 (3rd)	9.0	2 / 21	▼1
Campania	2010	590,592	21.4	14 / 60	–
Campania	2015	443,722 (1st)	19.5	16 / 51	▲2
Campania	2020	398,490 (1st)	16.9	9 / 51	▼7
Apulia	2010	410,395	20.8	19 / 70	▼9
Apulia	2015	316,876 (1st)	19.8	14 / 51	▼9
Apulia	2020	289,188 (1st)	17.2	17 / 51	▲3
Basilicata	2010	87,134	27.1	10 / 30	–
Basilicata	2013	58,730	24.9	12 / 21	▲2
Basilicata	2019	22,423 (5th)	7.7	3 / 21	▼9
Calabria	2010	162,081	15.8	10 / 50	–
Calabria	2014	282,827 (1st)	36.2	14 / 30	▲4
Calabria	2020	118,249 (1st)	15.2	6 / 31	▼8
Sicily	2008	505,420	18.8	29 / 90	–
Sicily	2012	257,274	13.4	23 / 90	▼6
Sicily	2017	250,633 (3rd)	13.0	12 / 70	▼11
Sardinia	2009	204,223	24.7	19 / 80	–
Sardinia	2014	150,492	22.1	19 / 60	0
Sardinia	2019	96,235 (1st)	13.5	8 / 60	▼11

== Forza Italia ==
=== Italian Parliament ===
Chamber of Deputies
Election year	Votes	%	Seats	+/−	Leader
2018	4,596,956 (4th)	14.0	104 / 630	–	Silvio Berlusconi

Senate of the Republic
Election year	Votes	%	Seats	+/−	Leader
2018	4,358,004 (4th)	14.4	57 / 315	–	Silvio Berlusconi

=== European Parliament ===
European Parliament
Election year	Votes	%	Seats	+/−	Leader
2014	4,614,364 (3rd)	16.8	13 / 73	–	Silvio Berlusconi
2019	2,351,673 (4th)	8.8	7 / 76	▼6	Silvio Berlusconi

=== Regional Councils ===
Region	Election year	Votes	%	Seats	+/−
Aosta Valley	2018	1,862 (10th) (Note: In a joint list with Brothers of Italy.)	2.9	0 / 35	–
Aosta Valley	2020	3,761 (7th) (Note: In a joint list with Brothers of Italy.)	5.7	0 / 35	0
Piedmont	2019	161,137 (4th)	8.4	3 / 50	▼3
Lombardy	2018	750,628 (4th)	14.3	14 / 80	▼5
South Tyrol	2018	2,825 (12th)	1.0	0 / 35	▼1
Trentino	2018	7,204 (10th)	2.8	1 / 35	–
Veneto	2015	110,573 (5th)	6.0	3 / 51	▼14
Veneto	2020	73,244 (5th)	3.6	2 / 51	▼1
Friuli-Venezia Giulia	2018	50,908 (3rd)	12.1	5 / 49	▼3
Emilia-Romagna	2014	100,478 (4th)	8.4	2 / 50	▼8
Emilia-Romagna	2020	55,317 (7th)	2.6	1 / 50	▼1
Liguria	2015	68,283 (4th)	12.7	3 / 31	▼7
Liguria	2020	33,040 (7th)	5.3	1 / 31	▼2
Tuscany	2015	112,658 (4th)	8.5	2 / 41	▼14
Tuscany	2020	69,456 (6th)	4.3	1 / 41	▼1
Marche	2015	49,884 (4th)	9.4	2 / 31	▼10
Marche	2020	36,716 (5th)	5.9	2 / 31	0
Umbria	2019	22,991 (5th)	5.5	1 / 21	▼1
Lazio	2018	371,155 (3rd)	14.6	6 / 50	▼3
Abruzzo	2019	54,223 (4th)	9.0	3 / 31	▼2
Molise	2018	13,627 (2nd)	9.4	4 / 21	▲2
Campania	2015	405,550 (2nd)	17.8	7 / 51	▼14
Campania	2020	121,695 (8th)	5.2	3 / 51	▼4
Apulia	2015	181,896 (3rd)	10.8	6 / 51	▼15
Apulia	2020	149,399 (5th)	8.9	4 / 51	▼2
Basilicata	2019	26,457 (3rd)	9.14	3 / 21	–
Calabria	2014	95,979 (3rd)	12.2	5 / 30	▼10
Calabria	2020	96,067 (2nd)	12.6	5 / 30	–
Sicily	2017	315,056 (2nd)	16.4	14 / 70	▲2
Sardinia	2019	56,450 (5th)	8.01	6 / 60	▼5

== Five Star Movement ==
=== Italian Parliament ===
Chamber of Deputies
Election year	Votes	%	Seats	+/−	Leader
2013	8,691,406 (2nd)	25.6	109 / 630	▲109	Beppe Grillo
2018	10,732,066 (1st)	32.7	227 / 630	▲119	Luigi Di Maio

Senate of the Republic
Election year	Votes	%	Seats	+/−	Leader
2013	7,285,648 (2nd)	23.8	54 / 315	▲54	Beppe Grillo
2018	9,733,928 (1st)	32.2	112 / 315	▲58	Luigi Di Maio

=== European Parliament ===
European Parliament
Election year	Votes	%	Seats	+/−	Leader
2014	5,807,362 (2nd)	21.2	17 / 73	–	Beppe Grillo
2019	4,569,089 (3rd)	17.1	14 / 76	▼3	Luigi Di Maio

=== Regional Councils ===
Region	Election year	Votes	%	Seats	+/−
Aosta Valley	2013	4,773	6.5	2 / 35	▲2
Aosta Valley	2018	6,652 (5th)	10.4	4 / 35	▲2
Aosta Valley	2020	2,589 (9th)	3.9	0 / 35	▼4
Piedmont	2010	69,448	3.7	2 / 60	–
Piedmont	2014	396,295 (2nd)	20.3	8 / 51	▲6
Piedmont	2019	241,014	12.6	5 / 51	▼3
Lombardy	2010	99,390	2.3	0 / 80	–
Lombardy	2013	775,211	14.3	9 / 80	▲9
Lombardy	2018	933,243 (3rd)	17.8	13 / 80	▲4
Lombardy	2023	113,229 (8th)	3.9	3 / 80	▼10
South Tyrol	2013	7,097	2.5	1 / 35	–
South Tyrol	2018	6,670 (8th)	2.4	1 / 35	0
Trentino	2013	13,889	5.9	2 / 35	–
Trentino	2018	18,437 (4th)	7.2	2 / 35	0
Veneto	2010	57,848	2.6	0 / 60	–
Veneto	2015	192,630 (4th)	10.4	5 / 50	▲5
Veneto	2020	55,281 (6th)	2.7	1 / 50	▼4
Friuli-Venezia Giulia	2013	54,952	13.8	5 / 49	▼1
Friuli-Venezia Giulia	2018	29,810 (4th)	7.1	4 / 49	▼1
Emilia-Romagna	2010	126,619	6.0	2 / 50	–
Emilia-Romagna	2014	159,456 (3rd)	13.3	5 / 50	▲3
Emilia-Romagna	2020	102,595	4.7	2 / 50	▼3
Liguria	2015	120,147 (2nd)	22.9	6 / 30	–
Liguria	2020	48,722 (5th)	7.8	2 / 30	▼4
Tuscany	2015	200,771 (3rd)	15.1	5 / 40	–
Tuscany	2020	113,836 (4th)	7.0	2 / 40	▼3
Marche	2015	100,202 (2nd)	18.9	5 / 30	–
Marche	2020	44,330 (4th)	7.1	2 / 30	▼3
Umbria	2015	51,203	14.6	2 / 21	–
Umbria	2019	30,953 (4th)	7.4	1 / 21	▼1
Lazio	2013	467,249	16.6	7 / 51	–
Lazio	2018	559,752 (1st)	22.1	10 / 51	▲3
Lazio	2023	132,041 (3rd)	8.5	4 / 51	▼6
Abruzzo	2014	143,779	21.4	6 / 31	–
Abruzzo	2019	118,273 (2nd)	19.7	7 / 31	▲1
Molise	2011	4,083	2.3	0 / 30	–
Molise	2013	20,437	12.2	2 / 21	▲2
Molise	2018	45,886 (1st)	31.6	6 / 21	▲4
Campania	2010	36,792	1.3	7 / 60	▲7
Campania	2015	387,327 (3rd)	17.0	7 / 50	▲7
Campania	2020	233,974 (3rd)	9.9	7 / 50	0
Apulia	2015	275,114 (2nd)	16.3	7 / 50	–
Apulia	2020	165,243 (3rd)	9.9	5 / 50	▼2
Basilicata	2013	21,219	9.0	2 / 21	–
Basilicata	2019	58,658 (1st)	20.3	3 / 21	▲1
Calabria	2014	38,345 (8th)	4.9	0 / 30	–
Calabria	2020	48,784	6.3	0 / 30	0
Sicily	2012	285,202	14.9	15 / 90	–
Sicily	2017	513,359 (1st)	26.7	20 / 70	▲5
Sardinia	2019	68,461 (4th)	9.7	6 / 60	–

== Lega Nord ==
=== Italian Parliament ===
Chamber of Deputies
Election year	Votes	%	Seats	+/−	Leader
1992	3,395,384 (4th)	8.6	55 / 630	–	Umberto Bossi
1994	3,235,248 (5th)	8.4	117 / 630	▲62	Umberto Bossi
1996	3,776,354 (4th)	10.8	59 / 630	▼58	Umberto Bossi
2001	1,464,301 (6th)	3.9	30 / 630	▼28	Umberto Bossi
2006	1,749,632 (6th)	4.6	28 / 630	▼2	Umberto Bossi
2008	3,024,758 (3rd)	8.3	60 / 630	▲32	Umberto Bossi
2013	1,390,156 (5th)	4.1	20 / 630	▼42	Roberto Maroni
2018	5,698,687 (3rd)	17.4	125 / 630	▲104	Matteo Salvini

Senate of the Republic
Election year	Votes	%	Seats	+/−	Leader
1992	2,732,461 (4th)	8.2	25 / 315	–	Umberto Bossi
1994	with PdL	–	60 / 315	▲35	Umberto Bossi
1996	3,394,733 (4th)	10.4	27 / 315	▼33	Umberto Bossi
2001	with CdL	–	17 / 315	▼10	Umberto Bossi
2006	1,530,667 (6th)	4.5	13 / 315	▼4	Umberto Bossi
2008	2,644,248 (3rd)	7.9	26 / 315	▲13	Umberto Bossi
2013	1,328,555 (5th)	4.3	18 / 315	▼8	Roberto Maroni
2018	5,321,537 (3rd)	17.6	58 / 315	▲40	Matteo Salvini

=== European Parliament ===
European Parliament
Election year	Votes	%	Seats	+/−	Leader
1989	636,242 (9th)	1.8	2 / 81	–	Umberto Bossi
1994	2,162,586 (5th)	6.5	6 / 87	▲4	Umberto Bossi
1999	1,395,547 (6th)	4.5	4 / 87	▼2	Umberto Bossi
2004	1,613,506 (7th)	5.0	4 / 78	–	Umberto Bossi
2009	3,126,915 (3rd)	10.2	9 / 72	▲5	Umberto Bossi
2014	1,688,197 (4th)	6.2	5 / 73	▼4	Matteo Salvini
2019	9,175,208 (1st)	34.3	28 / 73	▲24	Matteo Salvini

=== Regional Councils ===
==== Centre-North ====
Results in the ten central-northern regions and in the two autonomous provinces, where the party has national sections. Results before 1991 refer to their forerunners.

Region	Year	Votes	%	Seats	+/−
Aosta Valley	1993	6,176 (4th)	7.6	3 / 35	▲3
Aosta Valley	1998	2,653 (8th)	3.4	0 / 35	▼3
Aosta Valley	2003	with CdL	with CdL	0 / 35	–
Aosta Valley	2008	–	0 / 35	–	
Aosta Valley	2013	with SA	with SA	0 / 35	–
Aosta Valley	2018	10,872 (2nd)	17.1	7 / 35	▲7
Aosta Valley	2020	15,837 (1st)	23.9	11 / 35	▲4
Piedmont	1985	33,978 (11th) (Note: Ran as Piemont–Liga Veneta.) (with AIP)	1.1	0 / 60	–
Piedmont	1990	148,450 (4th)	5.1	3 / 60	▲3
Piedmont	1995	217,194 (4th)	9.9	5 / 60	▲2
Piedmont	2000	153,935 (4th)	7.6	3 / 60	▼2
Piedmont	2005	173,020 (5th)	8.5	4 / 73	▲1
Piedmont	2010	317,065 (3rd)	16.7	9 / 60	▲5
Piedmont	2014	141,741 (4th)	7.3	2 / 50	▼7
Piedmont	2019	712,703 (1st)	37.1	23 / 51	▲21
Lombardy	1985	28,074 (11th) (Note: Ran as Lega Lombarda–Liga Veneta.)	0.5	0 / 80	–
Lombardy	1990	1,183,493 (2nd)	18.9	15 / 80	▲15
Lombardy	1995	879,139 (2nd)	17.6	12 / 90	▼3
Lombardy	2000	702,479 (3rd)	15.4	11 / 80	▼1
Lombardy	2005	693,464 (2nd)	15.8	15 / 80	▲3
Lombardy	2010	1,117,227 (2nd)	26.2	20 / 80	▲5
Lombardy	2013	700,907 (4th); 552,863 (5th)	23.2 (Note: Combined result of party's official list (13.0%) and Roberto Maroni's personal list (10.2%).)	15 / 80	▼5 (Note: Two other members of the LN were elected from Roberto Maroni's personal list, so the number of councilors actually decreased by 3.)
Lombardy	2018	1,553,798 (1st); 76,637 (9th)	31.1 (Note: Combined result of party's official list (29.6%) and Attilio Fontana's personal list (1.5%).)	29 / 80	▲14 (Note: An additional member the LN was elected from Attilio Fontana's personal list, so the number of councilors actually decreased by 2.)
Lombardy	2023	476,175 (3rd); 177,387 (5th)	22.7 (Note: Combined result of party's official list (16.5%) and Attilio Fontana's personal list (6.2%).)	20 / 80	▼10
South Tyrol	1993	9,115 (7th)	3.0	1 / 35	▲1
South Tyrol	1998	2,606 (13th)	0.9	0 / 35	▼1
South Tyrol	2003	1,626 (13th)	0.5	0 / 35	–
South Tyrol	2008	6,411 (8th)	2.1	1 / 35	▲1
South Tyrol	2013	7,118 (6th) (with FI)	2.5 (with FI)	1 / 35	–
South Tyrol	2018	31,510 (3rd)	11.1	4 / 35	▲4
South Tyrol	2023	8,541 (10th)	3.0	1 / 35	▼3
Trentino	1993	50,095 (3rd)	16.2	6 / 35	▲6
Trentino	1998	24,941 (6th)	8.8	3 / 35	▼3
Trentino	2003	16,526 (5th)	6.2	2 / 35	▼1
Trentino	2008	38,533 (3rd)	14.7	6 / 35	▲3
Trentino	2013	14,759 (5th)	6.2	1 / 35	▼5
Trentino	2018	69,116 (1st)	27.1	14 / 35	▲13
Trentino	2023	30,347 (2nd); 24,953 (4th)	23.8 (Note: Combined result of party's official list (13.1%) and Maurizio Fugatti's personal list (10.7%).)	10 / 35	▼4
Veneto	1985	112,275 (5th) (Note: Ran as Liga Veneta.)	3.7	2 / 60	▲2
Veneto	1990	180,676 (5th)	5.9	3 / 60	▲1
Veneto	1995	422,410 (3rd)	16.7	9 / 65	▲6
Veneto	2000	274,472 (4th)	12.0	7 / 60	▼2
Veneto	2005	337,896 (3rd)	14.7	11 / 60	▲4
Veneto	2010	788,581 (1st)	35.2	20 / 60	▲9
Veneto	2015	427,363 (1st); 329,966 (2nd)	40.9 (Note: Combined result of Luca Zaia's personal list (23.1%) and party's official list (17.8%).)	24 / 60	▲4
Veneto	2020	916,087 (1st); 347,832 (2nd)	61.5 (Note: Combined result of Luca Zaia's personal list (45.6%) and party's official list (16.9%).)	33 / 51	▲9
Friuli-Venezia Giulia	1993	212,497 (1st)	26.7	18 / 60	▲18
Friuli-Venezia Giulia	1998	114,156 (2nd)	17.3	12 / 60	▼6
Friuli-Venezia Giulia	2003	46,408 (5th)	9.3	4 / 55	▼8
Friuli-Venezia Giulia	2008	73,239 (3rd)	12.9	8 / 59	▲4
Friuli-Venezia Giulia	2013	33,050 (5th)	8.3	3 / 49	▼5
Friuli-Venezia Giulia	2018	147,340 (1st)	34.9	18 / 49	▲15
Friuli-Venezia Giulia	2023	75,117 (1st); 70,192 (3rd)	36.8 (Note: Combined result of party's official list (19.0%) and Massimiliano Fedriga's personal list (17.8%).)	18 / 49	–
Emilia-Romagna	1985	11,564 (10th) (with AIP)	0.4	0 / 50	–
Emilia-Romagna	1990	85,379 (7th)	2.9	1 / 50	▲1
Emilia-Romagna	1995	86,400 (7th)	3.4	1 / 50	–
Emilia-Romagna	2000	79,714 (6th)	3.3	1 / 50	–
Emilia-Romagna	2005	109,092 (5th)	4.8	3 / 50	▲2
Emilia-Romagna	2010	288,601 (3rd)	13.7	4 / 50	▲1
Emilia-Romagna	2014	233,439 (2nd)	19.4	9 / 50	▲5
Emilia-Romagna	2020	690,864 (2nd); 37,462 (9th)	33.7 (Note: Combined result of party's official list (32.0%) and Lucia Borgonzoni's personal list (1.7%).)	14 / 48	▲5
Liguria	1985	10,751 (11th) (with UP)	0.9	0 / 40	–
Liguria	1990	71,311 (4th)	5.1	2 / 40	▲2
Liguria	1995	62,755 (5th)	6.5	2 / 40	–
Liguria	2000	38,104 (5th)	4.3	1 / 40	▼5
Liguria	2005	38,060 (6th)	4.7	1 / 40	–
Liguria	2010	76,265 (3rd)	10.2	3 / 40	▲2
Liguria	2015	109,203 (3rd)	20.3	7 / 30	▲4
Liguria	2020	107,371 (3rd)	17.1	6 / 30	▼1
Tuscany	1985	11,798 (10th) (with AIP)	0.8	0 / 50	–
Tuscany	1990	20,657 (13th)	0.8	0 / 50	–
Tuscany	1995	15,049 (11th)	0.7	0 / 50	–
Tuscany	2000	11,256 (14th)	0.6	0 / 50	–
Tuscany	2005	22,884 (9th)	1.3	0 / 65	–
Tuscany	2010	98,523 (4th)	6.5	3 / 53	▲3
Tuscany	2015	214.430 (2nd)	16.2	6 / 41	▲3
Tuscany	2020	353,514 (2nd)	21.8	9 / 41	▲3
Marche	1985	5,433 (10th) (with AIP)	0.6	0 / 40	–
Marche	1990	2,440 (13th)	0.3	0 / 40	–
Marche	1995	4,252 (13th)	0.5	0 / 40	–
Marche	2000	2,124 (16th)	0.3	0 / 40	–
Marche	2005	6,866 (12th)	0.8	0 / 40	–
Marche	2010	45,726 (4th)	6.3	2 / 41	▲2
Marche	2015	62,065 (3rd)	13.0	3 / 31	▲1
Marche	2020	139,438 (2rd)	22.4	8 / 31	▲5
Umbria	1985	2,103 (10th) (with AIP)	0.4	0 / 30	–
Umbria	1990	1,370 (13th)	0.2	0 / 30	–
Umbria	1995	–	–	0 / 30	–
Umbria	2000	1,227 (13th)	0.3	0 / 30	–
Umbria	2005	–	–	0 / 30	–
Umbria	2010	17,887 (7th)	4.3	1 / 30	▲1
Umbria	2015	49.203 (3rd)	14.0	2 / 20	▲1
Umbria	2019	154,413 (1st); 16,424 (7th)	40.9 (Note: Combined result of party's official list (37.0%) and Donatella Tesei's personal list (3.9%).)	10 / 21	▲8 (Note: Two other members of the LN were elected from Donatella Tesei's personal list, so the number of councilors actually increased by 10.)

==== Centre-South ====
Results in the remaining eight central-southern regions, where the party is active through Lega per Salvini Premier. Results before 2008 refer to previous sister parties.

Region	Election year	Votes	%	Seats	+/−
Lazio	1990	13,516 (13th) (Note: Ran as Lega Centro.)	0.5	0 / 60	–
Lazio	1995	13,516 (13th) (Note: Ran as Lega Italia Federale.)	0.5	0 / 60	–
Lazio	2018	252,772 (4th)	10.0	4 / 50	▲4
Lazio	2023	131,631 (4th)	8.5	3 / 50	▼1
Abruzzo	1990	1,567 (13th)	0.2	0 / 40	–
Abruzzo	2019	165,008 (1st)	27.5	10 / 31	▲10
Molise	1990	398 (11th) (Note: Ran as Lega Sud.)	0.2	0 / 30	–
Molise	2018	11,956 (5th)	8.2	2 / 21	▲2
Molise	2023	8,481 (8th)	6.0	2 / 21	▼1
Campania	1990	7,501 (13th)	0.2	0 / 60	–
Campania	1995	8,849 (15th)	0.3	0 / 60	–
Campania	2020	133,152 (6th)	5.7	3 / 51	▲3
Apulia	1990	6,072 (12th)	0.3	0 / 50	–
Apulia	1995	6,841 (14th)	0.4	0 / 51	–
Apulia	2015	38,661 (11th) (Note: Ran as Us with Salvini.)	2.4	0 / 49	–
Apulia	2020	160,507 (4th)	9.6	4 / 49	▲4
Basilicata	1990	631 (12th)	0.2	0 / 30	–
Basilicata	2019	55,393 (2nd)	19.2	6 / 21	▲6
Calabria	1990	2,928 (13th)	0.3	0 / 40	–
Calabria	1995	4,173 (13th)	0.5	0 / 42	–
Calabria	2020	95,400 (3rd)	12.25	4 / 29	▲4
Sardinia	1994	1,092 (16th) (Note: Ran as Lega Sardegna.)	0.1	0 / 80	–
Sardinia	2019	80,068 (2nd)	11.36	8 / 60	▲8
Sicily	1991	5,206 (16th)	0.2	0 / 90	–
Sicily	2017	108,713 (8th) (with FdI)	5.7	1 / 70	▲1
Sicily	2022	127,454 (6th)	6.0	1 / 70	▲4
