= 2025 Marche regional election =

Regional election in Italy

- 28–29 September 2025

All 31 seats to the Legislative Assembly of Marche
- Opinion polls
- Registered: 1,325,689
- Turnout: 50.01% (▼9.74%)
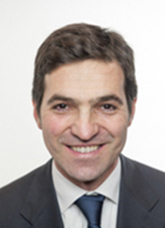

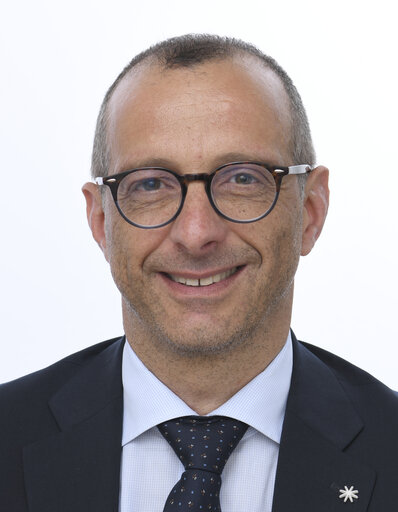
	Majority party	Minority party
Leader	Francesco Acquaroli	Matteo Ricci
Party	FdI	PD
Alliance	Centre-right	Centre-left
Seats won	20	11
Seat change	Steady	Steady
Popular vote	337,679	286,209
Percentage	52.4%	44.4%
Swing	▲3.3%	▼3.8%
- Map of the election result
President before election
Francesco Acquaroli
FdI
President-elect
Francesco Acquaroli
FdI

The 2025 Marche regional election in Marche, Italy, took place on 28–29 September 2025. The date was announced by Regional President Francesco Acquaroli, who stated the vote would be held in late September.

The contest featured incumbent President Francesco Acquaroli, a senator and former mayor of Potenza Picena, who ran for a second term as the centre-right coalitions alliance "Più Marche", which included Brothers of Italy (FdI), Lega, Forza Italia and seven other parties and civic lists. His main opponent was Matteo Ricci of the Democratic Party (PD), leading the centre-left "Alleanza del Cambiamento", an alliance of 19 parties and civic lists, including the PD, M5S, Italia Viva, PRC, +Europa, Volt and Europa Verde.

Acquaroli was first elected in 2020 with 49.13% of the vote and 20 out of 31 assembly seats, the first centre-right president in Marche's post-war history.

== Background ==
=== Electoral system ===
The Region of Marche operates under a standard regional statute. Both the Legislative Assembly and the President of the Region are elected at the same time through a regional election.

The Legislative Assembly is composed of 30 seats, filled using a system of proportional representation with open lists and preferential voting. Voters may express preferences for individual candidates within the lists. The electoral system includes a 5% threshold, which parties must reach in order to gain representation. However, this threshold is lowered to 3% for parties running as part of a coalition. The use of panachage (voting across multiple lists) is not permitted.

The region is divided into five provinces, each electing between four and nine councillors depending on population. The assembly members are elected proportionally within these constituencies.

The President of the Region is elected in a single-round, first-past-the-post vote. Each presidential candidate must be affiliated with one of the lists running for the Legislative Assembly, effectively barring independent candidates.

The electoral law includes a majority bonus for the list of the elected president to ensure stable governance:

- If the president's list receives between 34% and 37% of the vote, it is awarded 16 seats.
- Between 37% and 40% grants 17 seats.
- More than 40% awards 18 seats.

After assigning the bonus, the remaining seats are distributed proportionally among the other lists that passed the electoral threshold. Finally, the elected president automatically becomes a member of the Legislative Assembly, increasing the total number of members to 31.

Seat distribution
Provinces	Seats
Ancona	9
Ascoli Piceno	4
Fermo	4
Macerata	6
Pesaro and Urbino	7
President	1
Total	31

== Parties and candidates ==
=== Presidential candidate ===
Candidate	Experience	Campaign	Alliance
Francesco Acquaroli	President of Marche (2020–present); Member of the Chamber of Deputies for Marche (2018–2020); Mayor of Potenza Picena (2014–2018)	14 June 2025; Website	Centre-right coalition (More Marche)
Matteo Ricci	MEP for Central Italy (2024–present); Mayor of Pesaro (2014–2024); President of the Province of Pesaro and Urbino (2009–2014)	12 June 2025; Website	Centre-left coalition (Alliance of Change)

Parties and alliances for Presidential candidacy

==== Alleanza del Cambiamento ====
Candidate	Electoral list	Previous result	
Candidate	Electoral list	Votes (%)	Seats
Matteo Ricci (Note: Ricci also received support from Italy in Common)	Democratic Party (PD)	25.11	7
Matteo Ricci	Five Star Movement (M5S)	7.12	2
Matteo Ricci	Greens and Left Alliance (AVS)	(Note: In the 2020 regional election, Green Europe ran together with More Europe and civic candidates on the "Rebirth Marche" list, which received 2.77% of the vote. Meanwhile, Italian Left participated as part of the left-wing "Depend on Us" list, which gained 1.90%.)	-
Matteo Ricci	Marche Project: Italia Viva; Voice to the Marche; New Marche - Base of Change (dissidents from Popular Base); Solidary Democracy; Populars' Movement	3.17 (Note: In the 2020 regional election, Italia Viva's expanded list also included the Italian Socialist Party, Solidary Democracy, and civic candidates.)	-
Matteo Ricci	Matteo Ricci for President: PD individual members; Possible	(Note: in 2020 the "Mangialardi for President" list get 2.07%)	-
Matteo Ricci	Forward with Ricci - Civic Project: More Europe; Italian Socialist Party; Civic Marche; Marche Reformists (dissidents from Action); Liberal Socialist Movement; Italian Republican Party; Volt Italy	(Note: In the 2020 regional election, More Europe and Marche Civics ran together with Green Europe on the "Rebirth Marche" list, which received 2.77% of the vote. Meanwhile, the Italian Socialist Party ran alongside Italia Viva and Solidary Democracy, earning 3.17%.)	-
Matteo Ricci	Peace Health Work: Depend on Us; Communist Refoundation Party	1.90 (Note: In the 2020 regional election, the "Depend on Us" list also included Italian Left.)	-

==== Più Marche ====
Candidate	Political party	Previous result	
Candidate	Political party	Votes (%)	Seats
Francesco Acquaroli	Brothers of Italy	18.6	7
Francesco Acquaroli	League	22.3	8
Francesco Acquaroli	Forza Italia (incl. Popular Base)	5.8	2
Francesco Acquaroli	Union of the Centre	2.2	1
Francesco Acquaroli	Marche Civics	2.0	1
Francesco Acquaroli	Marchigiani with Acquaroli: Movement for Marche	0.9	-
Francesco Acquaroli	Us Moderates		

==== Other candidates ====
- Claudio Bolletta, supported by Sovereign Popular Democracy.
- Francesco Gerardi, supported by the Forza del Popolo list.
- Lidia Mangani, municipal councilor of Ancona supported by the Italian Communist Party.
- Beatrice Marinelli, supported by the Evolution of the Revolution list.

=== Regional Councilor candidates ===
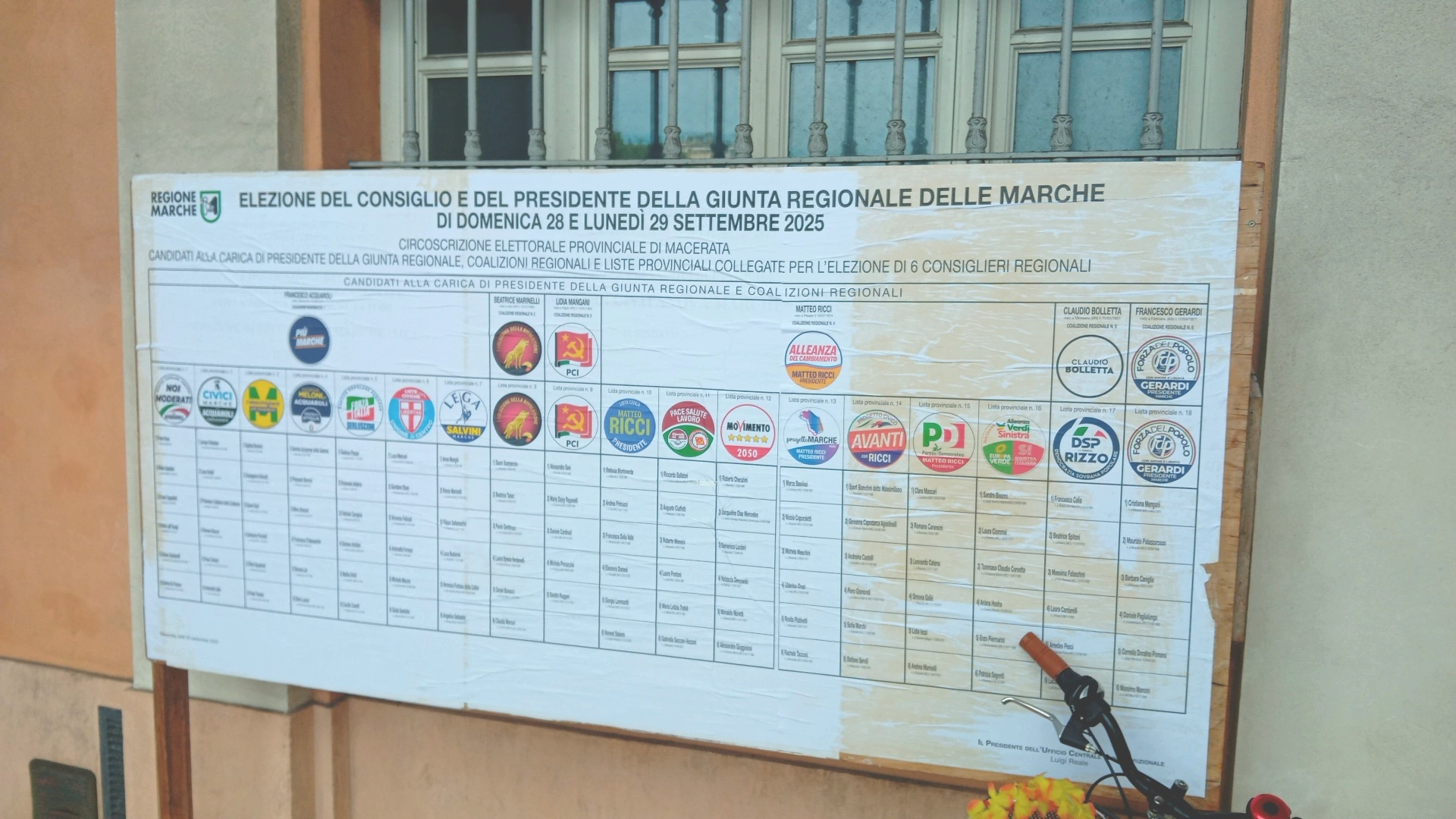
A list of the candidates at the Macerata constituency displayed outside of the municipal council office of Civitanova Marche.

== Campaign ==
On July 23, 2025, Ricci received a notice of investigation informing him that he was being investigated by the Pesaro prosecutor's office in connection with the "Affidopoli" investigation into alleged irregularities in the public procurement system that occurred during his tenure as mayor of the city.

Ricci denied the accusations, but despite this, the M5S requested clarification, and President Giuseppe Conte declared that he would read the prosecutor's case files against him to decide whether to continue supporting him in the elections. After the reading, the party reiterated its support for the candidate, arguing that there was no reason to do otherwise.

Subsequently, on 4 August 2025, in a centre-right conference held in Ancona during the electoral campaign, it was announced by Prime Minister Giorgia Meloni that the Marche and Umbria regions would enter the ZES, a project aimed at economic development and which was initially dedicated exclusively to the southern regions, but now also extended to part of central Italy.

=== Debates ===
Date	Location	Organizer	Link	Participants						Source
Date	Location	Organizer	Link	Acquaroli	Ricci	Bolletta	Gerardi	Mangani	Marinelli	Source
28 August 2025	Ancona	Uil Marche	Video	PI	PI	NI	NI	NI	NI	
12 September 2025	Ancona	TGR Marche	Video	PI	PI	PI	PI	PI	PI	
25 September 2025	Rome	Sky TG24	Video	PI	PI	NI	NI	NI	NI	
PI Present Invited NI Not Invited

== Opinion polls ==
On 26 September 2025, a fabricated opinion poll was circulated in the lead-up to the election, falsely indicating that centre-left candidate Matteo Ricci was leading over incumbent President Francesco Acquaroli. The poll, attributed to the polling institute SWG, was widely shared on social media, including by Democratic Party member, Alessia Morani, who referenced it in her posts. However, SWG publicly denied conducting or releasing the poll, stating it was a fake and reserving the right to take legal action.

Fratelli d'Italia responded by filing a formal complaint with Italy's communications authority, AGCOM, and the Public prosecutor's office in Ancona. Giovanni Donzelli, a prominent member of FdI, condemned the incident, calling it "a deliberate attempt to disseminate fake news during the election period".

=== Pollings ===
Date	Polling firm/ Client	Sample size	Acquaroli	Ricci	Marinelli	Mangani	Bolletta	Gerardi	Others	Lead	Abstention	Margin of error	Total contacts	Refusals	Method
9–11 September 2025	Tecnè srl – BiDimedia	800	51.0	45.5	–				3.5	5.5	10	±3.5	5281	4281 (84.9%)	CAWI – CATI
9–11 September 2025	IPSOS – Corriere della Sera	800	50.1	44.8	1.1	1.5	1.6	0.9	–	5.3	15	–	4249	–	CAWI – CATI – CAMI
26–29 August 2025	BiDiMedia / Citynews – AnconaToday	1,000	49.6	47.5	0.3	1.0	1.3	0.3	–	2.1	42 – 47	±3.1	1856	–	CAWI – Panel
11–12 July 2025	IZI S.p.A.	1,000	49.5	50.5	–					1.0	36.3 – 36.6	±3.0	–		CAMI–CAWI
16–17 Jun 2025	Tecnè / Dire	1,009	50.5–54.5	45.5–49.5	–					5.0	46	±3.	6,343	5,334 (84.1)	CATI–CAWI
10–17 April 2025	Tecnè / Corriere Adriatico	1,500	52.0–55.0	48.0	–					4.0–7.0	49	–			CATI-CAWI

=== Political parties ===
Date	Polling firm/ Client	Sample size	CDX							CSX							Others	Lead	Abstention
Date	Polling firm/ Client	Sample size	FdI	Lega	FI	MpA	Civici-McA	Civici-UdC	NM	PD	M5S	AVS	MRP	AcR	PSL (PRC-DdN)	PMMR	Others	Lead	Abstention
9–11 September 2025	IPSOS – Corriere della Sera	800	25	5.9	7.3	4.8	2.7	2.5	1.7	21.6	6.5	6.9	4	2.3	2.1	1.6	5.1	4.9 CDX	15
26–29 Aug 2025	BiDiMedia / Citynews – AnconaToday	1,856	26.1	7.7	6.4	4.1	2.9	1.8	1.0	25.2	6.1	5.6	4.3	2.3	1.0	2.6	3.9% (Note: Democrazia Sovrana Popolare 1.2%; Partito Comunista Italiano 1.0%; Evoluzione della Rivoluzione 0.4%; Forza del Popolo 0.3%)	2.9 CDX	20
16–17 Jun 2025	Tecnè / agenzia DIRE	1,009	29.8	8.5	11	-				21.8	11.8	6.2	-			2.2	4.9 (Note: Azione 3.2%; +Europa 1.7%)	9.5 CDX	46

== Outcome ==
=== Results ===
28–29 September 2025 Marche regional election results
Candidates	Votes	%	Seats	Parties	Votes	%	Seats
Francesco Acquaroli	337,679	52.43	1	Brothers of Italy	155,540	27.41	10
Francesco Acquaroli	337,679	52.43	1	Forza Italia	48,823	8.60	3
Francesco Acquaroli	337,679	52.43	1	Lega Marche	41,805	7.37	3
Francesco Acquaroli	337,679	52.43	1	Marchigiani for Acquaroli President	24,104	4.25	1
Francesco Acquaroli	337,679	52.43	1	Civics for Acquaroli President	14,680	2.59	1
Francesco Acquaroli	337,679	52.43	1	Union of the Centre	10,853	1.91	1
Francesco Acquaroli	337,679	52.43	1	Us Moderates	9,299	1.64	–
Francesco Acquaroli	337,679	52.43	1	Total	305,104	53.77	19
Matteo Ricci	286,209	44.44	1 (0) (Note: Ricci chose not to take his seat)	Democratic Party	127,638	22.50	6
Matteo Ricci	286,209	44.44	1 (0)	Civic List Ricci for President	41,650	7.34	2
Matteo Ricci	286,209	44.44	1 (0)	Five Star Movement	28,836	5.08	1
Matteo Ricci	286,209	44.44	1 (0)	Greens and Left Alliance	23,565	4.15	1
Matteo Ricci	286,209	44.44	1 (0)	Marche Alive Project	10,872	1.92	– (1) (Note: Gained a seat after Matteo Ricci chose not to take his seat)
Matteo Ricci	286,209	44.44	1 (0)	Civic Project Forward with Ricci	8,100	1.43	–
Matteo Ricci	286,209	44.44	1 (0)	Peace Health Work	6,392	1.13	–
Matteo Ricci	286,209	44.44	1 (0)	Total	247,053	43.54	10 (11) (Note: Gained a seat after Matteo Ricci chose not to take his seat)
Beatrice Marinelli	6,302	0.98	–	Evolution of the Revolution	4,867	0.86	–
Lidia Mangani	5,039	0.78	–	Italian Communist Party	3,388	0.60	–
Claudio Bolletta	4,851	0.75	–	Sovereign Popular Democracy	3,953	0.70	–
Francesco Gerardi	3,916	0.61	–	Force of the People	3,037	0.54	–
Blank and invalid votes	–	–					
Total candidates	643,996	100.00	2 (1) (Note: Ricci chose not to take his seat)	Total parties	567,402	100.00	29
Registered voters/turnout	–	50.01					
Source: Marche Region – Results

Popular vote by party
FdI	27.41%
PD	22.50%
FI	8.60%
Lega	7.37%
Ricci	7.34%
M5S	5.08%
MpA	4.25%
CpA	2.59%
MV	1.92%
UdC	1.91%
NM	1.64%
Avanti	1.43%
PSL	1.13%
Others	2.68%

Popular vote by president
Acquaroli	52.43%
Ricci	44.44%
Others	3.13%

Seat summary
Centre-right	64.52%
Centre-left	35.48%

=== Turnout ===
Voter turnout
Constituency	Sunday, September 28			Monday, September 29	Previous Election	
Constituency	12:00 PM	19:00 PM	23:00 PM	15:00 PM	Previous Election	
Ancona	9.60%	30.08%	37.72%	50.41%	60.50%	▼10.11%
Ascoli Piceno	10.33%	29.09%	36.26%	48.97%	57.70%	▼8.70%
Fermo	10.90%	30.64%	38.37%	51.22%	61.20%	▼9.95%
Macerata	10.15%	28.28%	35.82%	47.02%	56.60%	▼9.58%
Pesaro-Urbino	12.35%	32.84%	40.07%	52.38%	62.30%	▼9.89%
(Marche) Total	10.59%	30.23%	37.71%	50.01%	59.75%	▼9.74%

=== Analysis ===
Acquaroli defeated Ricci by 8 points, with greater support in southern Marche and a majority overall in the region, including 7 of the 11 cities with populations over 30,000. Ricci's support was concentrated in northern Marche, particularly in Ancona and his hometown of Pesaro. South of Ancona, he won in 13 municipalities, including Grottammare and Monteprandone, both with populations over 10,000.

While Ricci was elected as the second-place presidential candidate, he chose not to take his seat and remained in the European Parliament.

Acquaroli V Ricci by province
Province	Matteo Ricci	Francesco Acquaroli	Others
Pesaro-Urbino	69,005 45.29%	78,226 51.34%	5,124 3.36%
Ancona	98,901 49.85%	92,344 46.54%	7,160 3.61%
Macerata	51,646 38.72%	77,186 57.86%	4,568 3.42%
Fermo	27,575 37.13%	44,943 60.51%	1,750 2.36%
Ascoli Piceno	39,082 45.67%	44,980 52.57%	1,506 1.76%

Acquaroli V Ricci by major cities
City	Matteo Ricci	Francesco Acquaroli	Others
Ancona	21,662 53.14%	17,673 43.35%	1,431 3.51%
Pesaro	21,774 51.11%	19,143 44.93%	1,686 3.96%
Fano	12,729 47.07%	13,547 50.10%	764 2.83%
San Benedetto del Tronto	9,178 47.38%	9,822 50.70%	373 1.93%
Ascoli Piceno	8,309 40.00%	12,102 58.26%	362 1.74%
Senigallia	11,245 54.69%	8,671 42.17%	647 3.15%
Civitanova Marche	7,284 41.17%	9,734 55.02%	673 3.80%
Macerata	8,343 46.04%	9,129 50.38%	649 3.58%
Jesi	9,482 55.29%	6,984 40.72%	684 3.99%
Fermo	6,356 30.96%	10,454 60.79%	388 2.26%
Osimo	7,077 47.24%	7,476 49.91%	427 2.85%

=== Elected councilors ===
Party / List	Councilor elected	Preference votes	Constituency
Brothers of Italy	Francesco Acquaroli	President-Elect	
Brothers of Italy	Francesco Baldelli	6,447	Pesaro and Urbino
Brothers of Italy	Nicola Barbieri	4,412	Pesaro and Urbino
Brothers of Italy	Marco Ausili	4,235	Ancona
Brothers of Italy	Giacomo Bugaro	4,073	Ancona
Brothers of Italy	Corrado Canafoglia	3,396	Ancona
Brothers of Italy	Silvia Luconi	3,953	Macerata
Brothers of Italy	Pierpaolo Borroni	3,834	Macerata
Brothers of Italy	Andrea Putzu	6,005	Fermo
Brothers of Italy	Francesca Pantaloni	8,407	Ascoli Piceno
Brothers of Italy	Andrea Cardilli	7,358	Ascoli Piceno
Forza Italia	Tiziano Consoli	2,200	Ancona
Forza Italia	Gianluca Pasqui	4,043	Macerata
Forza Italia	Jessica Marcozzi	1,818	Fermo
Lega	Enrico Rossi	3,436	Pesaro and Urbino
Lega	Renzo Marinelli	2,847	Macerata
Lega	Andrea Maria Antonini	2,822	Ascoli Piceno
Marchigiani for Acquaroli President	Paolo Calcinaro	9,311	Fermo
Civics Marche	Giacomo Rossi	2,604	Pesaro and Urbino
Union of the Centre	Luca Marconi	1,067	Macerata
Democratic Party	Matteo Ricci	Elected as the second-place presidential candidate, but chose not to take his seat	
Democratic Party	Micaela Vitri	6,337	Pesaro and Urbino
Democratic Party	Valeria Mancinelli	8,050	Ancona
Democratic Party	Maurizio Mangialardi	4,078	Ancona
Democratic Party	Leonardo Catena	3,996	Macerata
Democratic Party	Fabrizio Cesetti	4,141	Fermo
Democratic Party	Enrico Piergallini	6,560	Ascoli Piceno
Civic List Ricci for President	Massimo Seri	1,501	Pesaro and Urbino
Civic List Ricci for President	Antonio Mastrovincenzo	2,051	Ancona
Five Star Movement	Marta Carmela Raimonda Ruggeri	2,630	Pesaro and Urbino
Greens and Left Alliance	Andrea Nobili	1,961	Ancona
Marche Alive Project	Michele Caporossi (Note: Gained a seat after Matteo Ricci chose not to take his seat)	1,577	Ancona

== See also ==
- 2025 Italian local elections
