= 2015 Italian regional elections =

← 2014	31 May 2015	2018 →

Presidents and regional assemblies of Veneto, Liguria, Tuscany, Marche, Umbria, Campania and Apulia
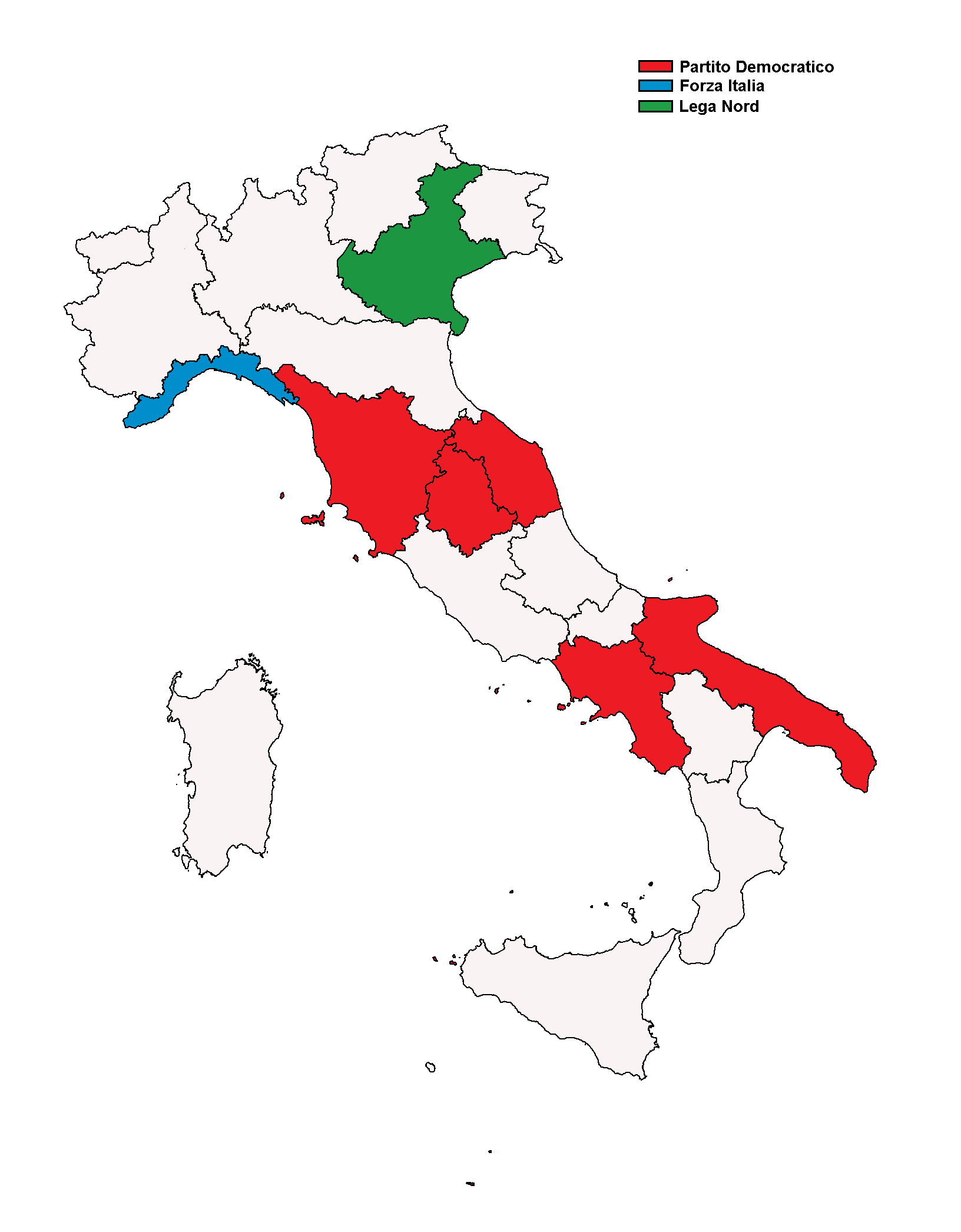
- Elected Presidents: Democratic Party Northern League Forza Italia

A large round of regional elections were held in Italy on 31 May 2015 in seven of the twenty regions composing the country, including four of the ten largest ones: Campania, Veneto, Apulia and Tuscany. The other three regions holding elections were Liguria, Marche, Umbria.

== Overall results ==
=== Regional councils ===
Alliance	Votes	%	Seats
Centre-left coalition	3,307,310	39.00	138 / 277
Centre-right coalition	3,006,482	35.46	85 / 277
Five Star Movement	1,327,685	15.66	38 / 277
Others	835,448	9.85	16 / 277
Total	8,476,925	100	277 / 277

Party	Votes	Seats
Democratic Party (PD)	2,134,229	100 / 277
Five Star Movement (M5S)	1,327,394	37 / 277
Northern League (LN)	1,192,230	42 / 277
Forza Italia (FI)	958,871	28 / 277
Brothers of Italy (FdI)	330,566	7 / 277
Popular Area (AP)	319,649	8 / 277
Left Ecology Freedom (SEL)	294,665	9 / 277

=== Presidents of the regions ===
Region	Election day	Outgoing			Elected		
Region	Election day	President	Party	Alliance	President	Party	Alliance
Veneto	31 May 2015	Luca Zaia	LN	Centre-right	Luca Zaia	LN	Centre-right
Liguria	31 May 2015	Claudio Burlando	PD	Centre-left	Giovanni Toti	FI	Centre-right
Marche	31 May 2015	Gian Mario Spacca	PD	Centre-left	Luca Ceriscioli	PD	Centre-left
Tuscany	31 May 2015	Enrico Rossi	PD	Centre-left	Enrico Rossi	PD	Centre-left
Umbria	31 May 2015	Catiuscia Marini	PD	Centre-left	Catiuscia Marini	PD	Centre-left
Campania	31 May 2015	Stefano Caldoro	FI	Centre-right	Vincenzo De Luca	PD	Centre-left
Apulia	31 May 2015	Nichi Vendola	SEL	Centre-left	Michele Emiliano	PD	Centre-left

== Summary by region ==
=== Veneto ===
President				Regional council			
Candidate	Party	Votes	%	Alliance	Votes	%	Seats
Luca Zaia	LN	1,108,065	50.1	Centre-right	965,994	52.2	29
Alessandra Moretti	PD	503,147	22.7	Centre-left	432,629	23.4	12
Jacopo Berti	M5S	262,749	11.9	M5S	192,630	10.4	5
Flavio Tosi	LTV	262,569	11.9	LTV–AP	199,177	10.8	5
Others		75,674	3.4	Others	60,575	3.3	0
Voters: 2,296,862 — Turnout: 57.2%

=== Liguria ===
President				Regional council			
Candidate	Party	Votes	%	Alliance	Votes	%	Seats
Giovanni Toti	FI	226,710	34.4	Centre-right	203,326	37.7	16
Raffaella Paita	PD	183,272	27.8	Centre-left	163,647	30.4	8
Alice Salvatore	M5S	163,527	24.8	M5S	120,219	22.3	6
Luca Pastorino	Ind	61,988	9.4	AET	35,593	6.6	1
Others		22,674	3.6	Others	16,465	3.0	0
Voters: 688,014 — Turnout: 50.7%

=== Tuscany ===
President				Regional council			
Candidate	Party	Votes	%	Alliance	Votes	%	Seats
Enrico Rossi	PD	656,920	48.0	Centre-left	637,629	47.6	25
Claudio Borghi	LN	273,795	20.0	LN–FdI	265,582	19.8	7
Giacomo Giannarelli	M5S	205,818	15.1	M5S	200,771	15.0	5
Stefano Mugnai	FI	124,432	9.1	Centre-right	120,654	9.0	2
Tommaso Fattori	Ind	85,870	6.3	AET	83,187	6.2	2
Others		20,767	1.6	Others	19,156	1.5	0
Voters: 1,441,504 — Turnout: 48.3%

=== Umbria ===
President				Regional council			
Candidate	Party	Votes	%	Alliance	Votes	%	Seats
Catiuscia Marini	PD	159,869	42.8	Centre-left	152,159	43.3	13
Claudio Ricci	Ind	146,752	39.3	Centre-right	135,594	38.6	6
Andrea Liberati	M5S	53,458	14.3	M5S	51,203	14.6	2
Others		13,594	3.8	Others	12,740	3.8	0
Voters: 391,210 — Turnout: 55.4%

=== Marche ===
President				Regional council			
Candidate	Party	Votes	%	Alliance	Votes	%	Seats
Luca Ceriscioli	PD	251,050	41.1	Centre-left	231,143	43.6	19
Giovanni Maggi	M5S	133,178	21.8	M5S	100,202	18.9	5
Francesco Acquaroli	FdI	116,048	19.0	FdI–LN	103,591	19.5	4
Gian Mario Spacca	Ind	86,848	14.2	Centre-right	75,320	14.2	3
Others		24,212	4.0	Others	20,266	3.8	0
Voters: 645,941 — Turnout: 49.8%

=== Campania ===
President				Regional council			
Candidate	Party	Votes	%	Alliance	Votes	%	Seats
Vincenzo De Luca	PD	987,927	41.2	Centre-left	917,395	40.3	31
Stefano Caldoro	FI	921,379	38.4	Centre-right	904,881	39.7	13
Valeria Ciarambino	M5S	420,839	17.5	M5S	387,546	17.0	7
Others		70,637	2.9	Others	67,332	2.9	0
Voters: 2,578,767 — Turnout: 51.9%

=== Apulia ===
President				Regional council			
Candidate	Party	Votes	%	Alliance	Votes	%	Seats
Michele Emiliano	PD	793,831	47.1	Centre-left	772,708	48.3	30
Antonella Laricchia	M5S	310,304	18.4	M5S	275,114	17.2	8
Francesco Schittulli	Ind	308,168	18.3	AP–FdI	296,752	18.5	8
Adriana Poli Bortone	Ind	242,641	14.4	Centre-right	231,540	14.5	5
Others		29,725	1.8	Others	24,205	1.5	0
Voters: 1,825,613 — Turnout: 51.2%
