= Lega Marche =

- Secretary: Giorgia Latini
- Ideology: Regionalism; Federalism; Populism
- National affiliation: Lega Nord (1991–2020); Lega per Salvini Premier (2020–present)
- Legislative Assembly of Marche: 8 / 31

Website
- https://www.legamarchesalvinipremier.it

Lega Marche (English: League Marche), whose complete name is Lega Marche per Salvini Premier (English: League Marche for Salvini Premier), is a regionalist political party active in Marche. The party was a "national" section of Lega Nord (LN) from 1991 to 2020 and has been the regional section of Lega per Salvini Premier (LSP) in Marche since 2020.

The party's long-time leader was Luca Rodolfo Paolini, member of the Chamber of Deputies in 2008–2013 and 2018–2022. The current leader is Giorgia Latini, member of the Chamber in 2018–2020 and since 2022, elected during a party congress in June 2023.

== Recent history ==
After the 2010 regional election the party entered the Legislative Assembly of Marche for the first time with two regional councillors, while in 2015 regional election it obtained its best result so far (13.0%) and, despite a reduction of the Assembly's numbers, obtained one more councillor. In the 2020 regional election the party obtained 22.4% of the vote and 8 councillors.

In the 2019 European Parliament election the party obtained a record 38.0% of the vote.

Following the formation of Lega per Salvini Premier and the 2019 federal congress of the LN, after which the latter became practically inactive, in February 2020 the LNM was re-established as Lega Marche per Salvini Premier in order to become the regional section of the new party. The founding members of the new LM were Massimo Agostinelli, Giorgia Latini and Tullio Patassini. In June 2023, during a party congress, Latini was unanimously elected secretary.

== Popular support ==
The party is a tiny one among the national sections of the LN, but it is recently gaining clout. In the 2015 regional election it won 13.0% of the vote in the region, its best result ever. While being usually stronger in the province of Pesaro and Urbino, the northern province which has historically been part of Romagna, in 2015 it obtained its best score in Macerata (17.2%).

The electoral results of Lega Nord Marche in the region are shown in the table below.

1990 regional	1992 general	1994 general	1995 regional	1996 general	1999 European	2000 regional	2001 general	2004 European	2005 regional	2006 general	2008 general	2009 European	2010 regional
0.3	1.3	-	0.5	1.5	0.4	0.3	-	0.9	0.9	1.0	2.2	5.5	6.3

2013 general	2014 European	2015 regional	2018 general	2019 European	2020 regional	2022 general	2024 European
0.7	2.7	13.0	17.3	38.0	22.4	7.9	8.2

== Electoral results ==
Legislative Assembly of Marche

Election year	Votes	%	Seats	+/−
1985	5,433 (10th)	0.6	0 / 40	–
1990	2,440 (13th)	0.3	0 / 40	–
1995	4,252 (13th)	0.5	0 / 40	–
2000	2,124 (16th)	0.3	0 / 40	–
2005	6,866 (12th)	0.8	0 / 40	–
2010	45,726 (4th)	6.3	2 / 41	▲2
2015	62,065 (3rd)	13.0	3 / 31	▲1
2020	139,148 (2nd)	22.4	8 / 31	▲5

== Leadership ==
- Secretary: Luca Rodolfo Paolini (1995–2017), Paolo Arrigoni (commissioner 2017–2020), Riccardo Marchetti (commissioner 2020–2023), Mauro Lucentini (commissioner 2023), Giorgia Latini (2023–present)
- President: unknown (1995–2002), Stefano Gaetani (2002–2007), Giordano Giampaoli (2012–2017)
