= Marche 2020 =

Marche 2020 – Party of Marche Marche 2020 – Partito delle Marche
- Leader: Vittoriano Solazzi
- Founded: December 2014
- Dissolved: 2015
- Split from: Democratic Party
- Ideology: Regionalism; Centrism

Website
- www.marche2020.it/

Marche 2020 – Party of Marche (Italian: Marche 2020 – Partito delle Marche, M20 or M2020) was a regional centrist and Christian-democratic political party in Marche, Italy.

The party was formed, out of an association, in December 2014 by Gian Mario Spacca (President of Marche since 2005), Vittoriano Solazzi (President of the Regional Council of Marche since 2010) and other defectors from the Democratic Party (PD), mainly former Christian Democrats (both Spacca and Solazzi had been members of Christian Democracy, the Italian People's Party and Democracy is Freedom – Daisy). The decision to leave the PD was taken when it was clear that the party would not have let Spacca run for a third-consecutive term as President in the 2015 regional election.

M20 flirted with the idea of taking part to the centre-left primary, but finally decided to part ways with the PD. Spacca was thus chosen as the party's candidate for President and secured the support of Forza Italia and the New Centre-Right, the two main centre-right parties. M20 was soon endorsed also by the Italian Republican Party, which has in Marche one of its strongholds under the leadership of Luciana Sbarbati, and by the representatives of various civic lists.

Eventually, the joint list of M20 and Popular Area (comprising only the New Centre-Right, without the Union of the Centre) won 4.0% of vote in the regional election.
