= Popular Area =

Popular Area Area Popolare
- Leader: Angelino Alfano
- Founded: 11–16 December 2014
- Dissolved: 21–29 March 2017
- Preceded by: New Centre-Right – Union of the Centre
- Succeeded by: Popular Civic List
- Ideology: Christian democracy Social conservatism Pro-Europeanism
- Political position: Centre to centre-right
- European affiliation: European People's Party
- European Parliament group: EPP Group

Popular Area (Italian: Area Popolare, AP) was a centre-right and mainly Christian-democratic coalition, which included two parliamentary groups active in each house of the Italian Parliament: the Chamber of Deputies and the Senate.

"Popular" was a reference to popolarismo, the Italian variety of Christian democracy.

== History ==
The groups, launched in December 2014, originally included 34 deputies and 36 senators, comprising the New Centre-Right (NCD), the Union of the Centre (UdC), some dissidents from Civic Choice (SC) and a splinter from the Five Star Movement (M5S). The UdC and most former SC members were previously affiliated to the For Italy groups.

In the 2015 regional elections, Popular Area ran lists in Veneto, Liguria and Tuscany. In Campania and Umbria the names "Popular Campania" and "For Popular Umbria" were used, respectively. Finally, in Marche and Apulia, the NCD (without the UdC) formed a joint list with Marche 2020 and Francesco Schittulli's movement, respectively, under the Popular Area banner. The best results were obtained in Apulia (6.0%), Campania (4.0%) and Marche (4.0%); in Apulia and Marche the UdC, which was in alliance with the centre-left Democratic Party (PD), scored 6.0% and 3.4%, respectively.

In the run-up of the 2016 constitutional referendum the UdC campaigned for the "No", while the NCD was among the keenest supporters of the "Yes". After the referendum, which saw a huge defeat of the "Yes" side, the UdC left Popular Area altogether. However, some UdC splinters, notably including Pier Ferdinando Casini, Gianpiero D'Alia and Gian Luca Galletti, launched an alternative party named Centrists for Europe (CpE) and confirmed their alliance with the NCD within Popular Area.

In March 2017 the NCD was dissolved into Popular Alternative (AP) and also Popular Area was set aside.

== Composition ==
The alliance was originally composed by the following two parties:

Party	Ideology	Leader
New Centre-Right (NCD)	Conservatism; Christian democracy	Angelino Alfano
Union of the Centre (UdC)	Christian democracy Social conservatism	Pier Ferdinando Casini; Lorenzo Cesa

Since December 2016, the alliance is composed by the following parties:

Party	Ideology	Leader
New Centre-Right (NCD)	Conservatism; Christian democracy	Angelino Alfano
Centrists for Europe (CpE)	Christian democracy Centrism	Pier Ferdinando Casini; Gianpiero D'Alia

== Electoral results ==
=== Regional Councils ===
Region	Latest election	# of overall votes	% of overall vote	# of overall seats won
Abruzzo	2014	40,219 (#4)	5.9	1 / 31
Apulia	2015	101,817 (#7)	6.4	4 / 51
Calabria	2014	101,817	8.2	3 / 30
Campania	2015	68,594 (#5)	5.9	1 / 51
Emilia-Romagna	2014	31,635 (#7)	2.6	0 / 50
Liguria	2015	9,269 (#9)	1.7	1 / 31
Marche	2015	21,049 (#7)	4.0	1 / 31
Piedmont	2014	49,059 (#7)	2.5	0 / 50
Tuscany	2015	15,808 (#8)	1.2	0 / 41
Umbria	2015	9,285 (#9)	2.6	0 / 20
Veneto	2015	37,937 (#11)	2.0	1 / 51

== Leadership ==
- Group Leader in the Chamber of Deputies: Nunzia De Girolamo (2014–2015), Maurizio Lupi (2015–2017)
- Group Leader in the Senate: Maurizio Sacconi (2014–2015), Renato Schifani (2015–2016), Laura Bianconi (2016–2017)
