= Giorgia Latini =

Italian politician

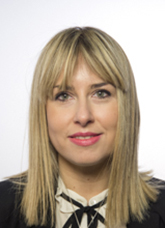

Member of the Parliament of Italy
- Incumbent
- Assumed office 19 March 2018
- Parliamentary group: Lega Nord
- Constituency: Marche

Personal details
- Born: 18 April 1980 (age 45)
- Occupation: Politician

Giorgia Latini is an Italian politician. She was elected to be a deputy to the Parliament of Italy in the 2018 Italian general election for the Legislature XVIII of Italy.

== Career ==
Latini was born on 18 April 1980 in Fabriano.

She was elected to the Italian Parliament in the 2018 Italian general election, to represent the district of Marche for Lega Nord.
