= Rodolfo Giampaoli =

Italian politician (1939–2026)

President of Marche
- In office 22 July 1990 – 19 July 1993
- Preceded by: Emidio Massi
- Succeeded by: Gaetano Recchi

Personal details
- Born: 30 July 1939 Pesaro, Italy
- Died: 19 June 2026 (aged 86)
- Party: DC
- Education: University of Urbino
- Occupation: Academic

Rodolfo Giampaoli (30 July 1939 – 19 June 2026) was an Italian politician. A member of Christian Democracy, he served as president of Marche from 1990 to 1993.

Giampaoli died on 19 June 2026, at the age of 86.
