= 1995 Marche regional election =

Italian regional elections

← 1990	23 April 1995	2000 →

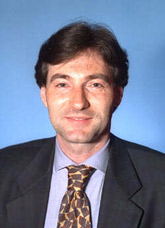
	Majority party	Minority party
Leader	Vito D'Ambrosio	Stefano Bastianoni
Party	PDS	Forza Italia
Alliance	Centre-left	Centre-right
Seats won	26	12
Popular vote	486,631	367,030
Percentage	51.6%	38.9%
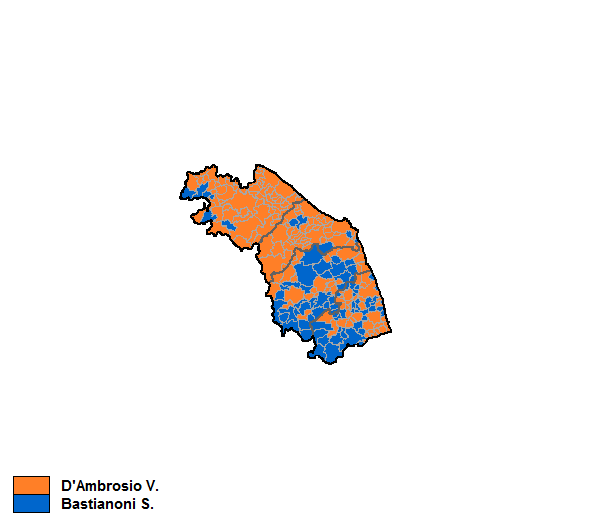
President of Marche before election
Gaetano Recchi
PSI
President of Marche
Vito D'Ambrosio
PDS

The Marche regional election of 1995 took place on 23 April 1995.

For the first time the President of the Region was directly elected by the people, although the election was not yet binding and the President-elect could have been replaced during the term.

Vito D'Ambrosio (Democratic Party of the Left) was elected President of the Region, defeating Stefano Bastianoni (Forza Italia) by a landslide.

== Results ==
Candidates	votes	votes (%)	seats reg. list	seats prov. lists
Vito D'Ambrosio	486,631	51.56	8	18
Democratic Party of the Left	283,429	33.64	→	12
Communist Refoundation Party	86,293	10.24	→	3
Pact of Democrats	38,695	4.59	→	1
Federation of the Greens	24,632	2.92	→	1
Italian Republican Party	16,866	2.00	→	1
Labour Federation	4,648	0.55	→	-
Stefano Bastianoni	367,030	38.89	-	12
Forza Italia – The People's Pole	164,829	19.57	→	6
National Alliance	129,220	15.34	→	5
Christian Democratic Centre	26,756	3.18	→	-
Paolo Polenta	60,401	6.40	-	2
Italian People's Party	51,057	6.06	→	2
Achille Castignani	10,962	1.16	-	-
Tricolour Flame	4,397	0.52	→	-
Ruggero Morresi	10,224	1.08	-	-
Pannella List	7,344	0.87	→	-
Luca Rodolfo Paolini	8,525	0.90	-	-
Lega Nord Marche	4,252	0.50	→	-
Total	943,773	100.00	8	32

Source: Ministry of the Interior
