= Gian Mario Spacca =

Italian politician (born 1953)

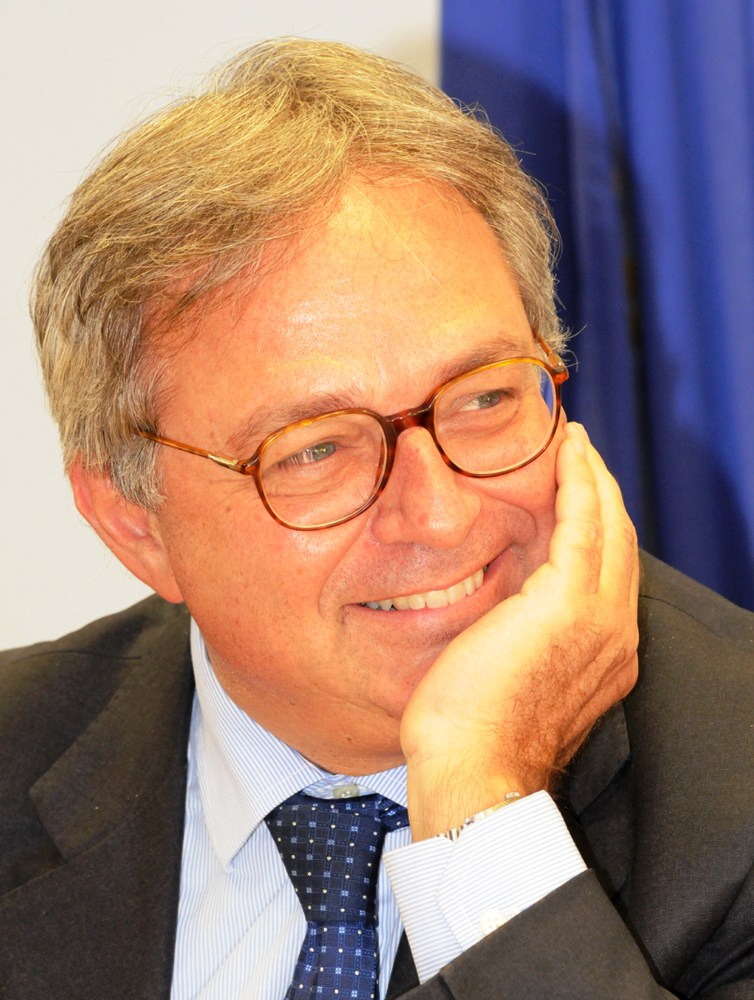

President of Marche
- In office 18 April 2005 – 12 June 2015
- Preceded by: Vito D'Ambrosio
- Succeeded by: Luca Ceriscioli

Personal details
- Born: 16 February 1953 (age 73) Fabriano, Italy
- Party: DC (1985–1994); PPI (1994–2002); DL (2002–2007); PD (2007–2012); Marche 2020 (since 2012)
- Education: Sapienza University of Rome
- Profession: Politician

Gian Mario Spacca (born 16 February 1953) is an Italian politician who served as the president of Marche from 2005 to 2015.

He was born in Fabriano, Marche, on 16 February 1953. In 1976, he graduated from Sapienza University of Rome with a degree in Political Science. His thesis director in Criminal Law and Procedure was Aldo Moro. In 1979, he joined the Research Department of the Merloni Finanziaria S.p.A. as a manager. He served on the board of directors of the Aristide Merloni Foundation and was coordinator of cultural activities and research from 1982 to 1990. Since 1982, he has been editor of the magazine Economia Marche, published by Il Mulino. From 1993 to 2000, he was Vice President of the Foundation Gioventù Chiesa e Speranza that collaborates in the organisation and execution of World Youth Day.

In 1990, he was elected a member of the Regional Council of Marche and became Chairman of the Committee on Planning and the Environment. In 1993, he was named Councillor for Crafts, Industry, Professional Training and Labour. In 1995, he was re-elected and nominated Councillor for Productive Activities. After being re-elected in 2000, he was nominated Vice-Chair of the Regional Government. He was affiliated with the centrist Margherita party. On 4 April 2005, he was elected President of Marche for the centre-left The Union coalition (of which Margherita was a member), with 57.75% of the vote or 499,793 votes. He also represented Marche on the European Union's Committee of Regions. On 29 March 2010, he was re-elected as President of the region with 53.17% of the vote.

He was affiliated with the Democratic Party (PD), into which the major components of The Union coalition merged in 2007, and formally left the party in 2012. In the run-up to the 2015 regional election, he ran independently as head of the centrist project Marche 2020, which ran joint lists with the centre-right Popular Area alliance. His candidacy for reelection was also supported by centre-right Forza Italia, but not his former party PD. He was defeated by the official PD candidate Luca Ceriscioli by a wide margin and was placed fourth, even behind the candidates of Five Star Movement and Lega Nord Marche. His presidential ballot won only 14.2% of the votes, and only 4.0% voted for his Marche 2020 list (most votes for his presidential bid coming from Forza Italia voters).
