= 2015 Marche regional election =

Italian regional election

- May 31, 2015

All 31 seats to the Regional Council of Marche
- Turnout: 49.78% (▼12.99%)
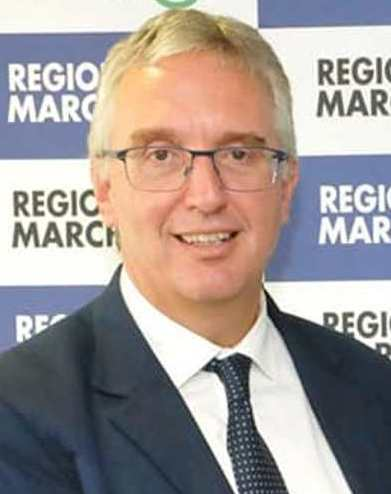

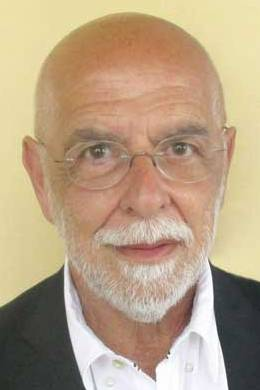

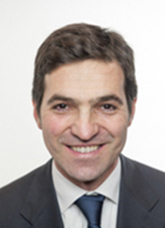
	Majority party	Minority party	Third party
Leader	Luca Ceriscioli	Giovanni Maggi	Francesco Acquaroli
Party	Democratic Party	Five Star Movement	Brothers of Italy
Alliance	Centre-left		Right-wing
Seats won	19	5	4
Seat change	▼7	New party	New coalition
Popular vote	251,050	133,178	116,048
Percentage	41.1%	21.8%	19.0%
Swing	▼12.1%	New party	New coalition
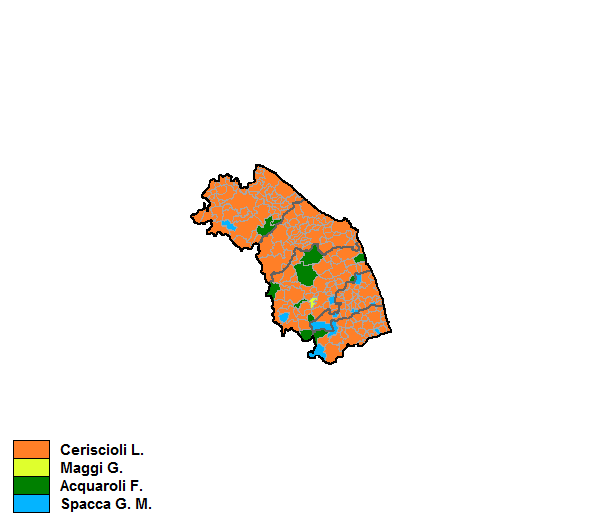
President before election
Gian Mario Spacca
Democratic Party
President-elect
Luca Ceriscioli
Democratic Party

The Marche regional election of 2015 took place on 31 May 2015.

Luca Ceriscioli of the Democratic Party (PD) was elected President by defeating a fractured field of opponents, notably including the incumbent President, Gian Mario Spacca, who had switched sides from the PD to a centre-right coalition led by Forza Italia.

== Results ==
31 May 2015 Marche regional election results
Candidates	Votes	%	Seats	Parties	Votes	%	Seats
Luca Ceriscioli	251,050	41.07	1	Democratic Party	186,357	35.13	15
Luca Ceriscioli	251,050	41.07	1	United for Marche (incl. PSI, FdV, IdV, SC)	26,677	5.03	2
Luca Ceriscioli	251,050	41.07	1	Marche Populars–UDC (incl. CD, DemoS)	18,109	3.41	1
Luca Ceriscioli	251,050	41.07	1	Total	231.143	43.57	18
Giovanni Maggi	133,178	21.78	–	Five Star Movement	100,202	18.89	5
Francesco Acquaroli	116,048	18.98	–	Lega Nord Marche	69,065	13.02	3
Francesco Acquaroli	116,048	18.98	–	Brothers of Italy	34,538	6.51	1
Francesco Acquaroli	116,048	18.98	–	Total	103,591	19.53	4
Gian Mario Spacca	86,848	14.21	–	Forza Italia	49,884	9.40	2
Gian Mario Spacca	86,848	14.21	–	Marche 2020–Popular Area	21,049	3.97	1
Gian Mario Spacca	86,848	14.21	–	Christian Democracy	4,388	0.83	–
Gian Mario Spacca	86,848	14.21	–	Total	75,320	14.20	3
Edoardo Mentrasti	24,212	3.96	–	Other Marche–United Left (incl. SEL, PRC, PCdI)	20,266	3.82	–
Invalid votes	34.605	–					
Total candidates	645,941	100.00	1	Total parties	530,522	100.00	30
Registered voters	1,297,485	49.78					
Source: Ministry of the Interior – Results

== See also ==
- 2015 Italian regional elections
