= 2005 Marche regional election =

Italian regional elections

- 3–4 April 2005
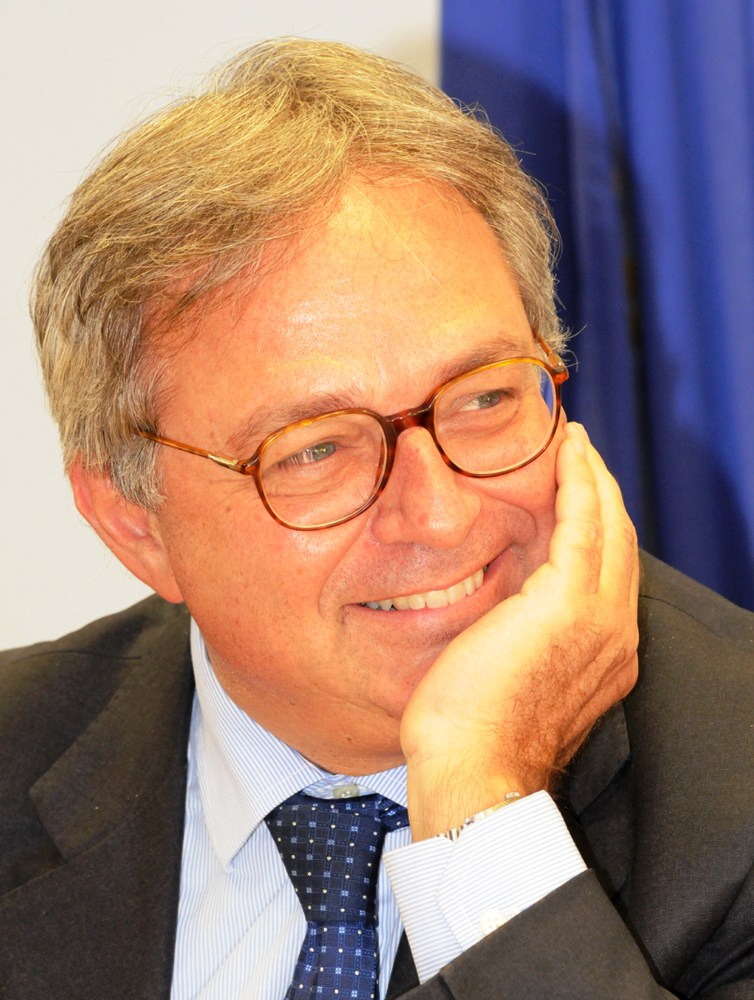

	Majority party	Minority party
Leader	Gian Mario Spacca	Francesco Massi
Party	The Daisy	Forza Italia
Alliance	The Union	House of Freedoms
Seats won	24	16
Seat change	▼1	▼1
Popular vote	499,381	333,181
Percentage	57.8%	38.5%
Swing	▲7.9%	▼5.7%
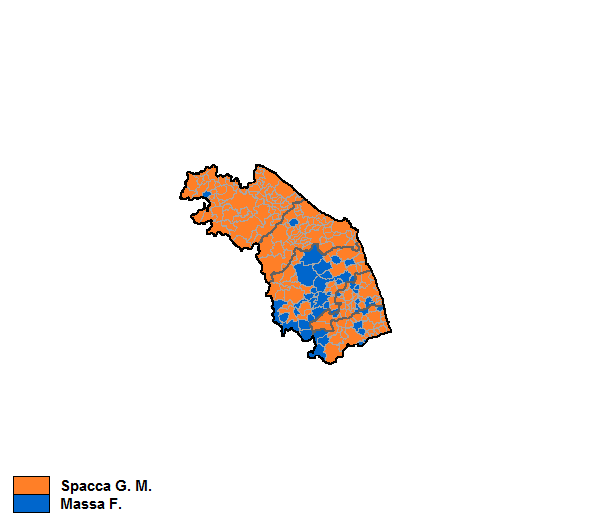
President of Marche before election
Vito D'Ambrosio
DS
President of Marche
Gian Mario Spacca
The Daisy

The Marche regional election of 2005 took place on 3–4 April 2005.

Gian Mario Spacca (The Daisy, then Democratic Party) defeated Francesco Massi (Union of Christian and Centre Democrats, at the time, now member of The People of Freedom) by a landslide.

== Results ==
Candidates & parties	votes	votes (%)	seats reg. list	seats prov. lists
Gian Mario Spacca	499,381	57.76	4	20
The Olive Tree	316,816	40.12	→	15
Communist Refoundation Party	49,989	6.33	→	2
Party of Italian Communists	31,316	3.97	→	1
Federation of the Greens	25,666	3.25	→	1
UDEUR	14,172	1.79	→	1
Italy of Values	11,136	1.41	→	0
Civic Lists	5,780	0.73	→	0
Francesco Massi	333,181	38.54	1	15
Forza Italia	142,058	17.99	→	8
National Alliance	102,107	12.93	→	5
Union of Christian and Centre Democrats	57,293	7.26	→	2
Lega Nord Marche	6,866	0.87	→	0
Michele Tiraboschi	19,778	2.29	-	-
Christian Democracy	10,857	1.37	→	0
New PSI–PRI–PLI–PSDI–Others	5,125	0.65	→	0
Vincenzo Rosini	12,239	1.42	-	-
Social Alternative	10,068	1.28	→	0
No Euro	390	0.05	→	0
Total	864,579	100.00	5	35

Source: Ministry of the Interior
