= 1975 Marche regional election =

The Marche regional election of 1975 took place on 15 June 1975.

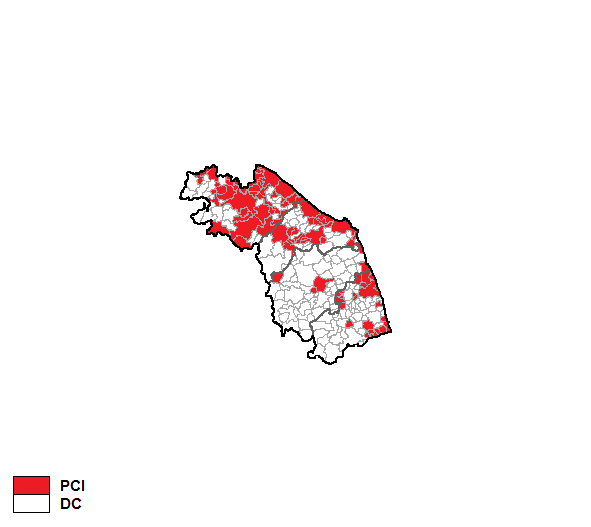
Largest party by municipality

== Events ==
The Italian Communist Party was the largest party, narrowly ahead of Christian Democracy. However, for a trick of the electoral law, it obtained less seats. So, after the election, Christian Democrat Adriano Ciaffi formed a government including also the Italian Socialist Party, the Italian Democratic Socialist Party and the Italian Republican Party (organic Centre-left). Emidio Massi took over from Ciaffi in 1978.

== Results ==
Parties	votes	votes (%)	seats
Italian Communist Party	350,018	36.9	15
Christian Democracy	346,092	36.4	16
Italian Socialist Party	92,958	9.8	4
Italian Democratic Socialist Party	50,666	5.3	2
Italian Social Movement	42,122	4.4	1
Italian Republican Party	32,595	3.4	1
Proletarian Unity Party	20,122	2.1	1
Italian Liberal Party	14,605	1.5	-
Total	949,018	100.0	40

Source: Ministry of the Interior
