= 1980 Marche regional election =

The Marche regional election of 1980 took place on 8 June 1980.

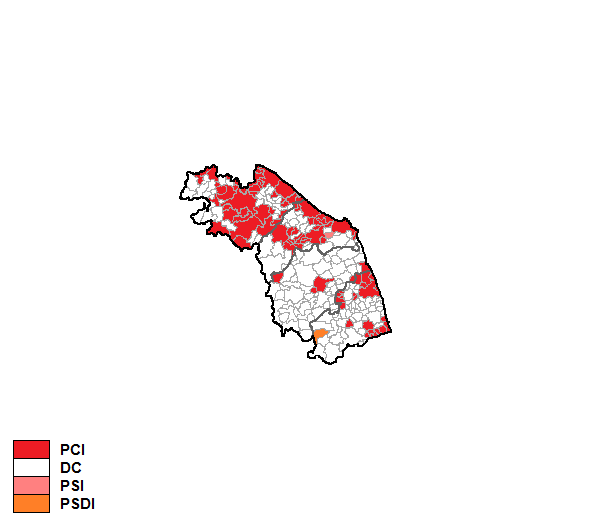
Largest party by municipality

== Events ==
The Italian Communist Party was the largest party, narrowly ahead of Christian Democracy, but again it obtained less seats for a trick of the electoral law. Consequently, after the election Emidio Massi, the incumbent Socialist President, formed a new government including also the Christian Democracy, the Italian Democratic Socialist Party and the Italian Republican Party (organic centre-left).

== Results ==
Parties	votes	votes (%)	seats
Italian Communist Party	355,444	37.2	15
Christian Democracy	354,478	37.1	16
Italian Socialist Party	95,989	10.1	4
Italian Democratic Socialist Party	42,770	4.5	1
Italian Social Movement	41,182	4.3	1
Italian Republican Party	36,274	3.8	1
Proletarian Unity Party	14,564	1.5	1
Italian Liberal Party	13,660	1.4	1
European Workers' Party	541	0.1	-
Total	954,902	100.0	40

Source: Ministry of the Interior
