= 2020 Marche regional election =

Regional council election in Italy

- 20–21 September 2020

All 31 seats to the Legislative Assembly of Marche
- Turnout: 59.75% (▲9.97%)
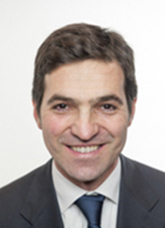

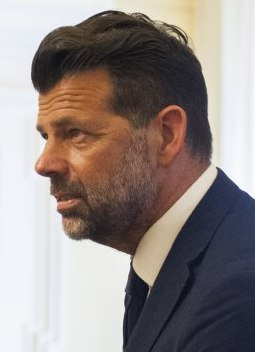
	Majority party	Minority party
Leader	Francesco Acquaroli	Maurizio Mangialardi
Party	Brothers of Italy	Democratic Party
Alliance	Centre-right	Centre-left
Seats won	20	9
Seat change	▲13	▼10
Popular vote	361,186	274,152
Percentage	49.13%	37.29%
Swing	▲15.94%	▼3.78%
President before election
Luca Ceriscioli
Democratic Party
President
Francesco Acquaroli
Brothers of Italy

The 2020 Marche regional election in Marche, Italy, took place on 20–21 September. It was originally scheduled to take place on 31 May 2020, but was delayed due to the coronavirus pandemic in Italy.

The centre-right coalition candidate, senator and former mayor of Potenza Picena Francesco Acquaroli, defeated the Democratic candidate, Maurizio Mangialardi, who was serving as Mayor of Senigallia. Acquaroli was the first centre-right candidate elected president in the history of the region and was elected with 49.3% of the regional popular vote, winning 20 of 31 seats in the regional council. The election generated some controversy because the centre-right candidate was present at a dinner to commemorate the March on Rome on 28 October 2019, with other far-right Italian politicians. It was the first election during the COVID-19 pandemic in Italy in the Marche region.

== Parties and candidates ==
Political party or alliance	Constituent lists	Previous result		Candidate
Political party or alliance	Constituent lists	Votes (%)	Seats	Candidate
Centre-left coalition	Democratic Party (PD)	35.1	15	Maurizio Mangialardi
Centre-left coalition	Mangialardi for President List (incl. Action and MRE)	—N/a	—N/a	Maurizio Mangialardi
Centre-left coalition	Italia Viva – Italian Socialist Party – Solidary Democracy – Marche Civics	3.2	1	Maurizio Mangialardi
Centre-left coalition	Rebirth Marche (More Europe – Civics – Greens)	—N/a	—N/a	Maurizio Mangialardi
Centre-left coalition	Brave Marche (incl. Art.1, IiC and M5S dissidents)	—N/a	—N/a	Maurizio Mangialardi
Centre-left coalition	Our Marche and the Centre	—N/a	—N/a	Maurizio Mangialardi
Centre-right coalition	League	13.0	3	Francesco Acquaroli
Centre-right coalition	Forza Italia – Civics for Marche	9.4	2	Francesco Acquaroli
Centre-right coalition	Brothers of Italy	6.5	1	Francesco Acquaroli
Centre-right coalition	Marche Populars – Union of the Centre	3.4	1	Francesco Acquaroli
Centre-right coalition	Civitas – Civics	2.1	1	Francesco Acquaroli
Centre-right coalition	Movement for Marche (incl. PRI, FV and M5S dissidents)	0.9	—N/a	Francesco Acquaroli
Five Star Movement		18.9	6	Gian Mario Mercorelli
Depend on Us (incl. SI and PRC)		3.8	–	Roberto Mancini
Communist! (incl. PC and PCI)		—N/a	—N/a	Fabio Pasquinelli
Vox Italia (incl. Human Value Party)		—N/a	—N/a	Sabrina Banzato
Reconquer Italy		—N/a	—N/a	Alessandra Contigiani
3V Movement		—N/a	—N/a	Anna Rita Iannetti

== Opinion polls ==
=== Candidates ===
Date	Polling firm/ client	Sample size	Mangialardi	Acquaroli	Mercorelli	Others	Undecided	Lead
28 Aug–2 Sep 2020	SWG	1,100	37.0	51.0	8.5	3.5	—N/a	14.0
28–30 Aug 2020	Ipsos	750	35.8	49.0	10.1	5.1	17.2	13.2
26 Aug 2020	Tecnè	2,000	35–39	43–47	13–17	2–4	—N/a	4–12
25–27 Aug 2020	Scenari Politici–Winpoll	1,000	36.1	51.8	8.9	3.2	—N/a	15.7
24 Aug–2 Sep 2020	Noto	—N/a	35–39	47–51	9–13	1–5	—N/a	8–16

==== Hypothetical candidates ====
Date	Polling firm/ client	Sample size	Mangialardi	Acquaroli	Other centre-right	Mercorelli	Others	Undecided	Lead
30–31 Jul 2020	Tecnè	1,000	38.0	45.5	—N/a	14.5	2.0	14.8	7.5
26 Jun 2020	Noto	–	40.0	48.0	—N/a	9.0	3.0	—N/a	8.0
12–14 Jun 2020	Sylla (Note: This poll was commissioned by a political party.)	500	42.3	40.7	—N/a	17.0	—N/a	—N/a	1.6
12–14 Jun 2020	Sylla	500	46.3	—N/a	36.3 (Note: Massimo Bacci)	17.4	—N/a	—N/a	10.0
12–14 Jun 2020	Sylla	500	39.9	—N/a	44.3 (Note: Fabrizio Ciarapica)	15.8	—N/a	—N/a	4.4
12–14 Jun 2020	Sylla	500	55.0	45.0	—N/a	w. Mangialardi	—N/a	—N/a	10.0
12–14 Jun 2020	Sylla	500	59.0	—N/a	41.0	w. Mangialardi	—N/a	—N/a	18.0
12–14 Jun 2020	Sylla	500	50.0	—N/a	50.0	w. Mangialardi	—N/a	—N/a	Tie
20 Feb 2020	Tecnè	–	47.4	50.6	—N/a	w. Mangialardi	2.0	47.2	3.2

=== Parties ===
Date	Polling firm	Sample size	Centre-left							M5S	Centre-right				Others	Undecided	Lead
Date	Polling firm	Sample size	PD	SI	IV	+Eu	A	EV	Other	M5S	Lega	FI	FdI	Other	Others	Undecided	Lead
28 Aug–2 Sep 2020	SWG	1,100	29.0	—N/a	2.0	—N/a	—N/a	—N/a	5.0	9.0	25.0	5.5	18.0	2.0	2.5	—N/a	4.0
28–30 Aug 2020	Ipsos	750	19.0	—N/a	2.3	—N/a	—N/a	—N/a	14.5	10.1	25.7	3.5	16.7	3.1	5.1	20.8	6.7
25–27 Aug 2020	Scenari Politici–Winpoll	1,000	22.8	—N/a	4.1	—N/a	—N/a	—N/a	9.2	8.9	23.3	4.0	18.1	6.4	3.2	—N/a	0.5
12–14 Jun 2020	Sylla	500	22.0	5.0	3.5	3.5	2.5	1.5	—N/a	15.5	20.5	6.5	12.0	5.5	2.0	—N/a	1.5

== Results ==
20–21 September 2020 Marche regional election results
Candidates	Votes	%	Seats	Parties	Votes	%	Seats
Francesco Acquaroli	361,186	49.13	1	League	139,438	22.38	8
Francesco Acquaroli	361,186	49.13	1	Brothers of Italy	116,231	18.66	7
Francesco Acquaroli	361,186	49.13	1	Forza Italia – Civics for Marche	36,716	5.89	2
Francesco Acquaroli	361,186	49.13	1	Populars Marche – Union of the Centre	14,067	2.26	1
Francesco Acquaroli	361,186	49.13	1	Civitas – Civics	12,958	2.08	1
Francesco Acquaroli	361,186	49.13	1	Movement for Marche	5,730	0.92	–
Francesco Acquaroli	361,186	49.13	1	Total	325,140	52.19	19
Maurizio Mangialardi	274,152	37.29	1	Democratic Party	156,394	25.11	7
Maurizio Mangialardi	274,152	37.29	1	Italia Viva	19,742	3.17	–
Maurizio Mangialardi	274,152	37.29	1	Rebirth Marche	17,268	2.77	1
Maurizio Mangialardi	274,152	37.29	1	Mangialardi for President List	12,884	2.07	–
Maurizio Mangialardi	274,152	37.29	1	Our Marche and the Centre	11,625	1.87	–
Maurizio Mangialardi	274,152	37.29	1	Brave Marche	9,270	1.49	–
Maurizio Mangialardi	274,152	37.29	1	Total	227,183	36.48	8
Gian Mario Mercorelli	63,355	8.62	–	Five Star Movement	44,330	7.12	2
Roberto Mancini	16,879	2.30	–	Depends on Us	11,834	1.90	–
Fabio Pasquinelli	10,381	1.41	–	Communist!	8,184	1.31	–
Sabrina Paola Banzato	4,121	0.56	–	Vox Italia	2,954	0.47	–
Anna Rita Ianetti	3,984	0.54	–	3V Movement	2,689	0.43	–
Alessandra Contigiani	1,142	0.16	–	Reconquer Italy	640	0.10	–
Blank and invalid votes	–	–					
Total candidates	735,200	100.00	2	Total parties	622,954	100.00	29
Registered voters/turnout	–	59.75					
Source: Marche Region – Results

Popular vote (party)
PD	25.11%
Lega	22.38%
FdI	18.66%
M5S	7.12%
FI	5.89%
IV	3.17%
Others	17.67%

President
Acquaroli	49.13%
Mangialardi	37.29%
Mercorelli	8.62%
Others	4.97%

Seat summary
Centre-right	64.52%
Centre-left	29.03%
M5S	6.45%

=== Results by province ===
Province	Francesco Acquaroli	Maurizio Mangialardi	Others
Ancona	96,494 42.27	98,933 43.34	32,861 14.4
Ascoli Piceno	50,395 51.72	34,415 35.32	12,637 12.97
Fermo	45,372 54.57	27,030 32.51	10,737 12.91
Macerata	86,418 56.96	45,523 30.01	19,775 13.04
Pesaro and Urbino	82,507 47.25	68,251 39.09	23,852 13.67
Total	361,186 49.13	274,152 37.29	99,862 13.59

=== Turnout ===
Region	Time			
Region	20 Sep			21 Sep
Region	12:00	19:00	23:00	15:00
Marche	13.42%	32.97%	42.72%	59.74%
Province	Time			
Province	20 Sep			21 Sep
Province	12:00	19:00	23:00	15:00
Ancona	14.00%	33.76%	42.96%	60.50%
Ascoli Piceno	12.32%	30.12%	41.07%	57.67%
Fermo	12.78%	32.43%	43.05%	61.17%
Macerata	12.41%	31.18%	40.51%	56.60%
Pesaro and Urbino	14.59%	35.61%	45.34%	62.27%
Source: Marche Region – Turnout

== See also ==
- 2020 Italian regional elections
