= 2010 Marche regional election =

- March 29, 2010

All 43 seats to the Regional Council of Marche
- Turnout: 62.77% (▼6.49%)
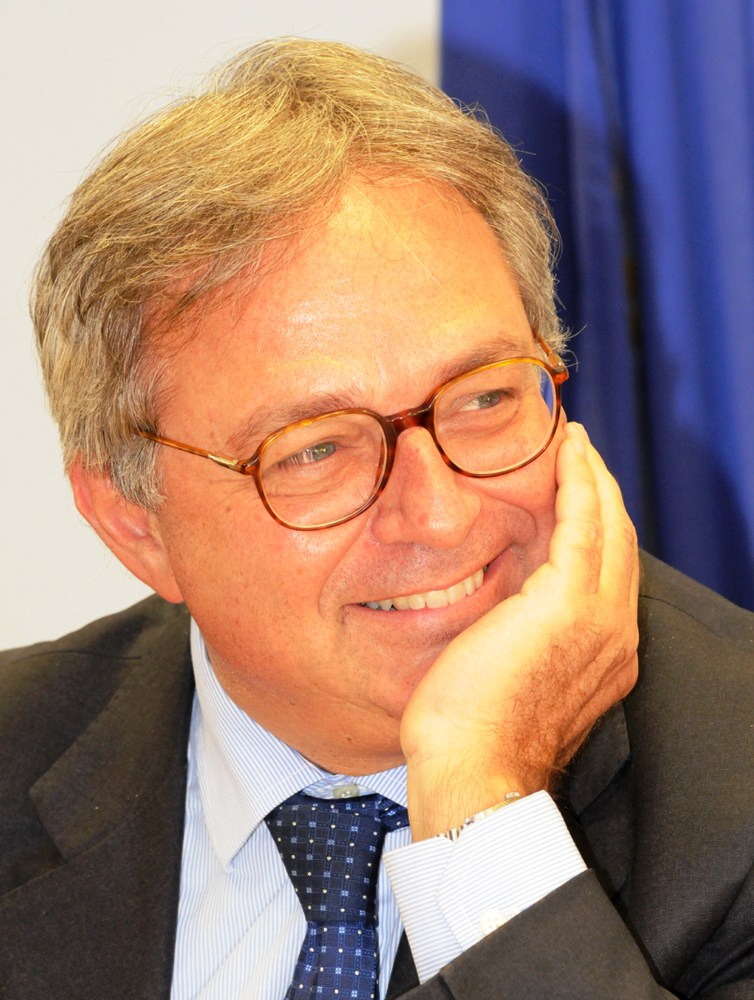

	Majority party	Minority party
Leader	Gian Mario Spacca	Erminio Marinelli
Party	Democratic Party	People of Freedom
Alliance	Centre-left	Centre-right
Last election	28 seats, 57.7%	17 seats, 38.6%
Seats won	26	15
Seat change	▼3	▼3
Popular vote	409,823	306,076
Percentage	53.2%	39.7%
Swing	▼4.5%	▲1.1%
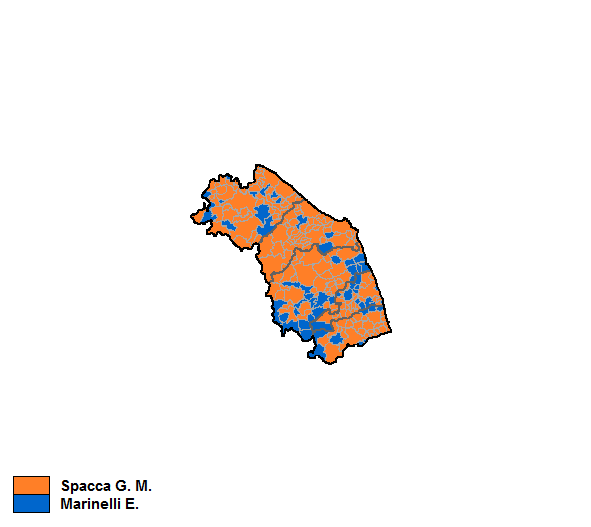
President of Marche before election
Gian Mario Spacca
Democratic Party
President of Marche
Gian Mario Spacca
Democratic Party

The Marche regional election of 2010 took place on 28–29 March 2010.

Gian Mario Spacca of the Democratic Party, supported also by the Union of the Centre and Alliance for Italy, defeated by a comfortable margin his centre-right opponent Erminio Marinelli and, thus, secured a second consecutive term as President. The People of Freedom was narrowly the largest party in the region.

== Results ==
Candidates & parties	votes	votes (%)	seats
Gian Mario Spacca	409,823	53.17	25
Democratic Party	224,897	31.12	15
Italy of Values	65,536	9.07	4
Union of the Centre	41,989	5.81	3
Reformist Alliance (PSI–MRE–UPC)	19,701	2.73	1
Alliance for Italy	14,554	2.01	1
Federation of the Greens	12,641	1.75	1
Civic Lists	6,274	0.87	0
Erminio Marinelli	306,075	39.71	14
The People of Freedom	225,472	31.20	12
Northern League Marche	45,726	6.33	2
Together for the President	9,555	1.32	1
The Right	9.178	1.27	0
Massimo Rossi	54,851	7.12	2
Federation of the Left	27,975	3.87	1
Left Ecology Freedom	19,108	2.64	1
Total	770,750	100.00	41

Source: La Repubblica
