= 2000 Marche regional election =

Italian election

- 16 April 2000

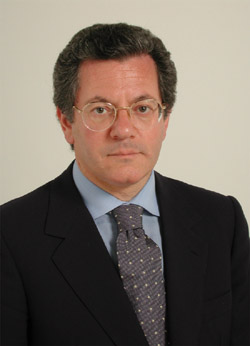
	Majority party	Minority party
Leader	Vito D'Ambrosio	Maurizio Bertucci
Party	DS	Forza Italia
Alliance	The Olive Tree	Pole for Freedoms
Seats won	25	15
Seat change	▼1	▲3
Popular vote	429,288	380,116
Percentage	49.9%	44.2%
Swing	▼8.1%	▲5.3%
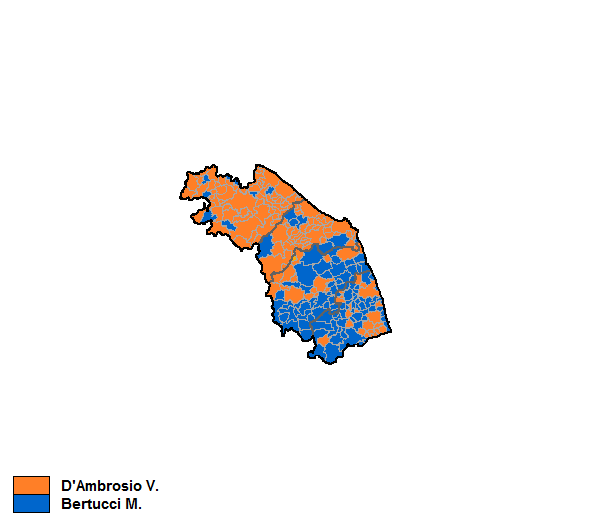
President of Marche before election
Vito D'Ambrosio
DS
President of Marche
Vito D'Ambrosio
DS

The Marche regional election of 2000 took place on 16 April 2000.

Vito D'Ambrosio (Democrats of the Left) was re-elected President, defeating Maurizio Bertucci (Forza Italia).

== Results ==
Candidates & parties	votes	votes (%)	seats reg. list	seats prov. lists
Vito D'Ambrosio	429,288	49.92	8	17
Democrats of the Left	216,933	26.79	→	9
Communist Refoundation Party	52,660	6.50	→	2
Italian People's Party–UDEUR	42,585	5.26	→	2
The Democrats	34,879	4.31	→	1
Federation of the Greens	20,762	2.56	→	1
Party of Italian Communists	19,712	2.43	→	1
Italian Democratic Socialists	19,334	2.39	→	1
Maurizio Bertucci	380,116	44.20	1	14
Forza Italia	158,705	19.60	→	7
National Alliance	131,177	16.20	→	5
United Christian Democrats	39,610	4.89	→	1
Christian Democratic Centre	28,195	3.48	→	1
The Liberals Sgarbi	7,610	0.94	→	0
Lega Nord Marche	2,124	0.26	→	0
Marcello Crivellini	20,441	2.38	-	-
Bonino List	15,065	1.86	→	0
Luciana Sbarbati	19,083	2.22	-	-
Italian Republican Party	13,381	1.65	→	0
Enrico Buoncompagni	11,106	1.29	-	-
Viva le Marche	7,085	0.87	→	0
Total	860,034	100.00	9	31

Source: Ministry of the Interior
