= 1990 Marche regional election =

The Marche regional election of 1990 took place on 6 and 7 May 1990.

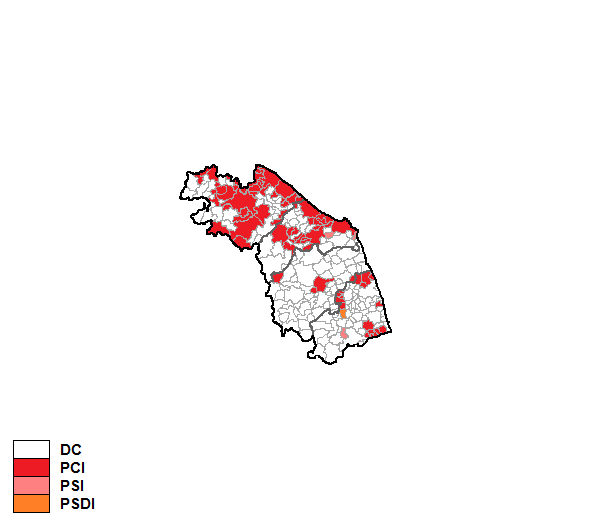
Largest party by municipality

== Events ==
Christian Democracy was the largest party. After the election Christian Democrat Rodolfo Giampaoli formed a new government including also the Italian Socialist Party, the Italian Democratic Socialist Party and the Italian Republican Party (organic Centre-left). Gaetano Recchi took over from Giampaoli in 1993.

== Results ==
Parties	votes	votes (%)	seats
Christian Democracy	359,360	36.3	15
Italian Communist Party	296,838	30.0	13
Italian Socialist Party	125,510	12.7	5
Italian Social Movement	38,880	3.9	1
Italian Republican Party	36,706	3.7	1
Green List	34,370	3.5	1
Italian Democratic Socialist Party	24,549	2.5	1
Hunting Fishing Environment	20,700	2.1	1
Italian Liberal Party	16,736	1.7	1
Rainbow Greens	14,026	1.4	1
Proletarian Democracy	9,570	1.0	-
Antiprohibitionists on Drugs	8,945	0.9	-
Centre League Marche	2,440	0.3	-
Pensioners Democratic Action	1,734	0.2	-
Total	990,464	100.0	40
Source:Ministry of the Interior
