= Francesco Acquaroli (politician) =

Italian politician (born 1974)

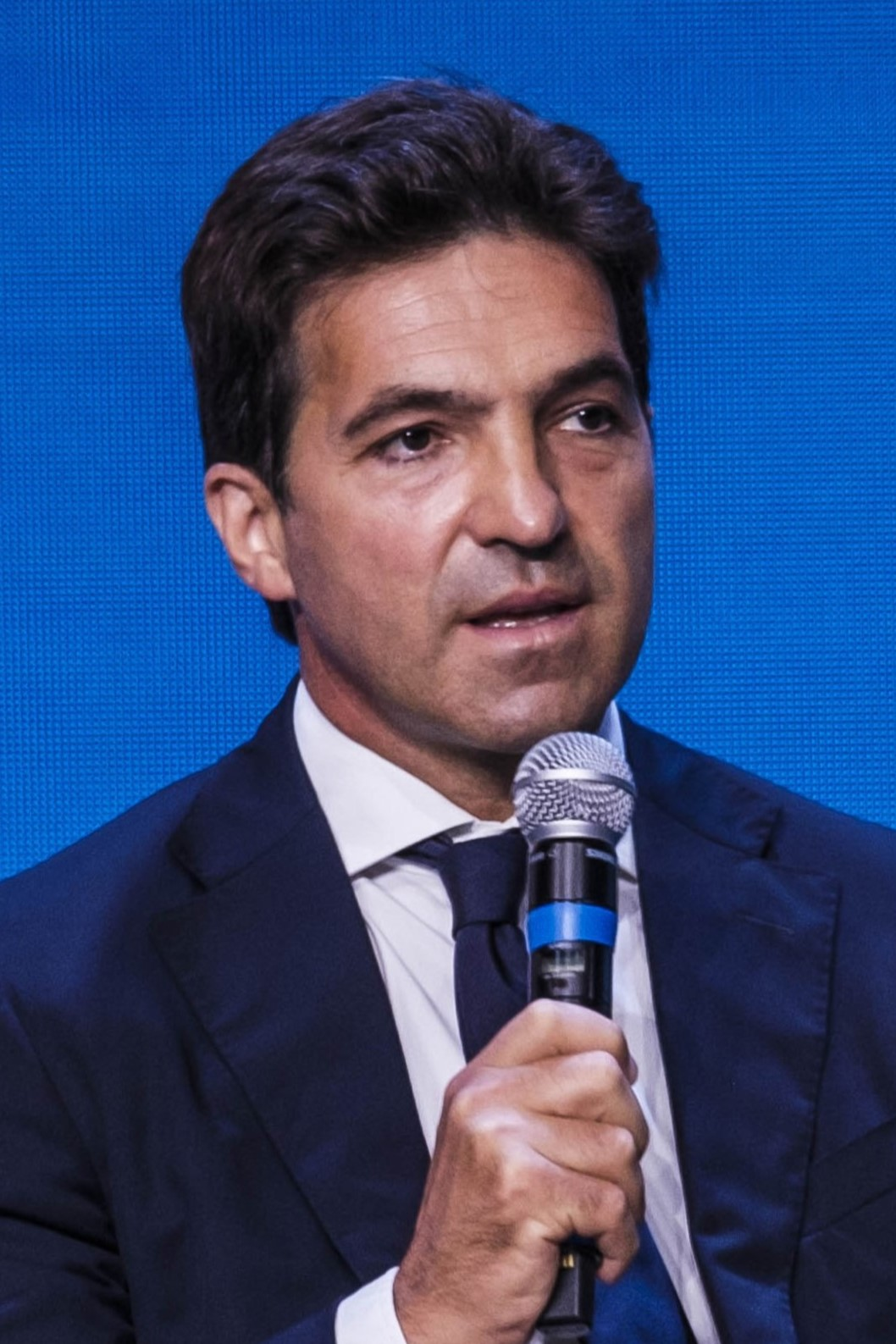
- Acquaroli in 2021

President of Marche
- Incumbent
- Assumed office 30 September 2020
- Preceded by: Luca Ceriscioli

Member of the Chamber of Deputies
- In office 23 March 2018 – 22 October 2020
- Constituency: Marche

Mayor of Potenza Picena
- In office 9 June 2014 – 8 June 2018
- Preceded by: Sergio Paolucci
- Succeeded by: Noemi Tartabini

Personal details
- Born: 25 September 1974 (age 51) Macerata, Marche, Italy
- Party: MSI (till 1995); AN (1995–2009); PdL (2009–2012); FdI (since 2012)
- Spouse: Lucia Appignanesi
- Education: University of Macerata

Francesco Acquaroli (born 25 September 1974) is an Italian politician of the Brothers of Italy (FdI).

== Education ==
Following his graduation from high school, he studied economics and business administration at the University of Macerata.

== Political career ==
He began his political commitment at a very young age as a member of municipal council of Potenza Picena.

In the regional elections in the Marches in 2010 he was a candidate for the regions council on the list of The People of Freedom (PdL) in support of the candidate for president Erminio Marinelli, resulting elected. He soon left the PdL and became a member of the newly founded Brothers of Italy following which his friendship with the leader of Brothers of Italy Giorgia Meloni began.

In 2014, Acquaroli was a candidate for Mayor of Potenza Picena and was elected on the 8 June 2014. Following his election as Mayor, he resigned from his post as a member of the regional council. In the parliamentary elections of 2018, he was elected deputy of the Brothers of Italy. Following his election he resigned from the office of Mayor of Potenza Picena in June 2018.

On 22 June 2020 he was proposed as the Brothers of Italy candidate for the presidency of the Marche in the 2020 regional elections within a center-right coalition of BdI, Lega Nord and Forza Italia. He was elected the president of Marche on the 20 September 2020.

=== 2025 Marche presidential re-election campaign ===
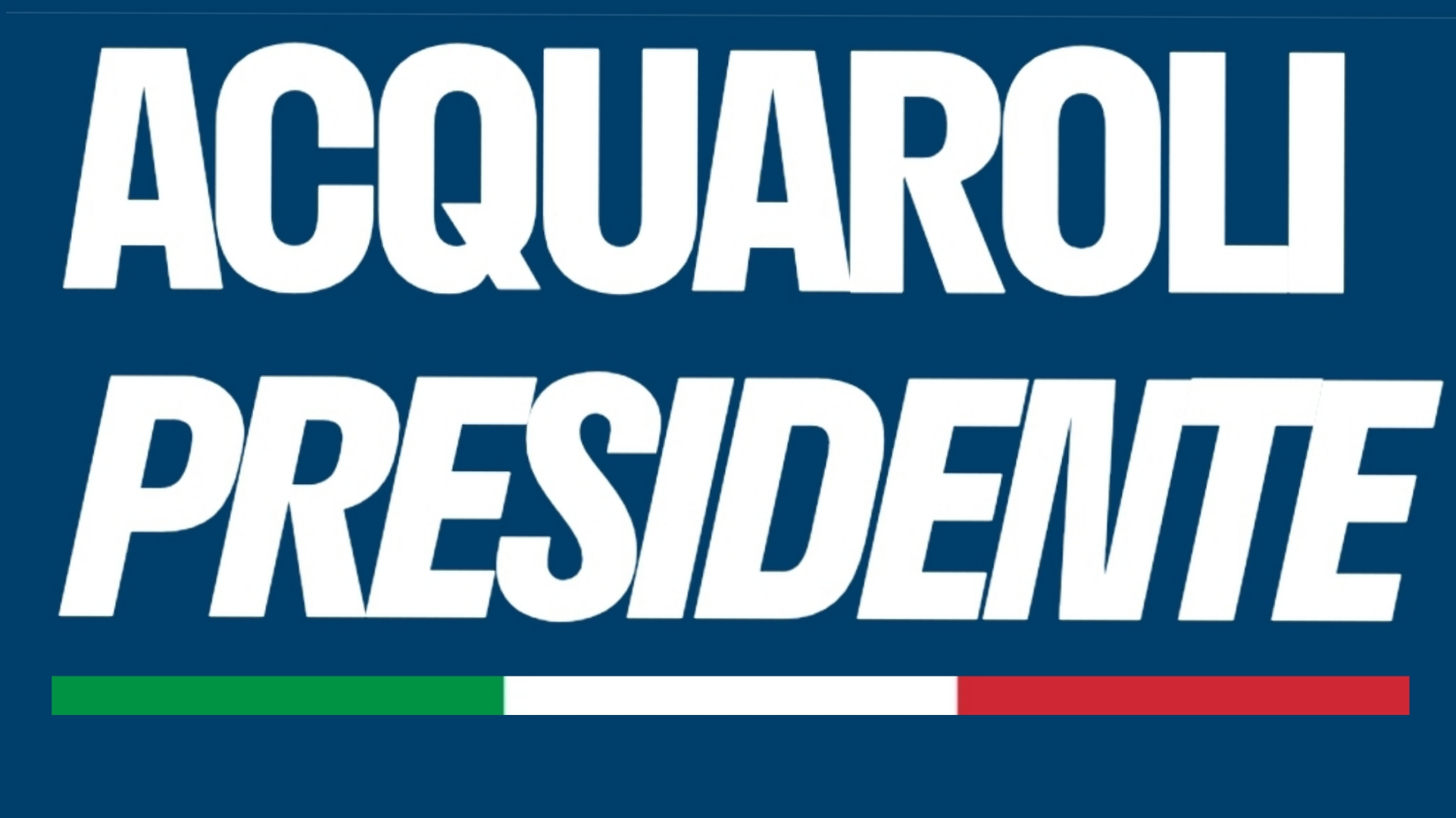

== Personal life ==
He is married to Lucia Appignanesi and is a fan of Inter Milan. He also has a brother.

== Controversy ==
On 28 October 2019, Aquaroli was present at a dinner in Acquasanta Terme organized by the provincial secretary of FdI to celebrate the March on Rome led by Benito Mussolini in 1922. The march on Rome was the beginning of the fascist dictatorship in Italy. Together with Acquaroli, the mayor of Ascoli Piceno, Marco Fioravanti, was also present at that dinner.
