= Montelabbate =

- Comune
- Comune di Montelabbate
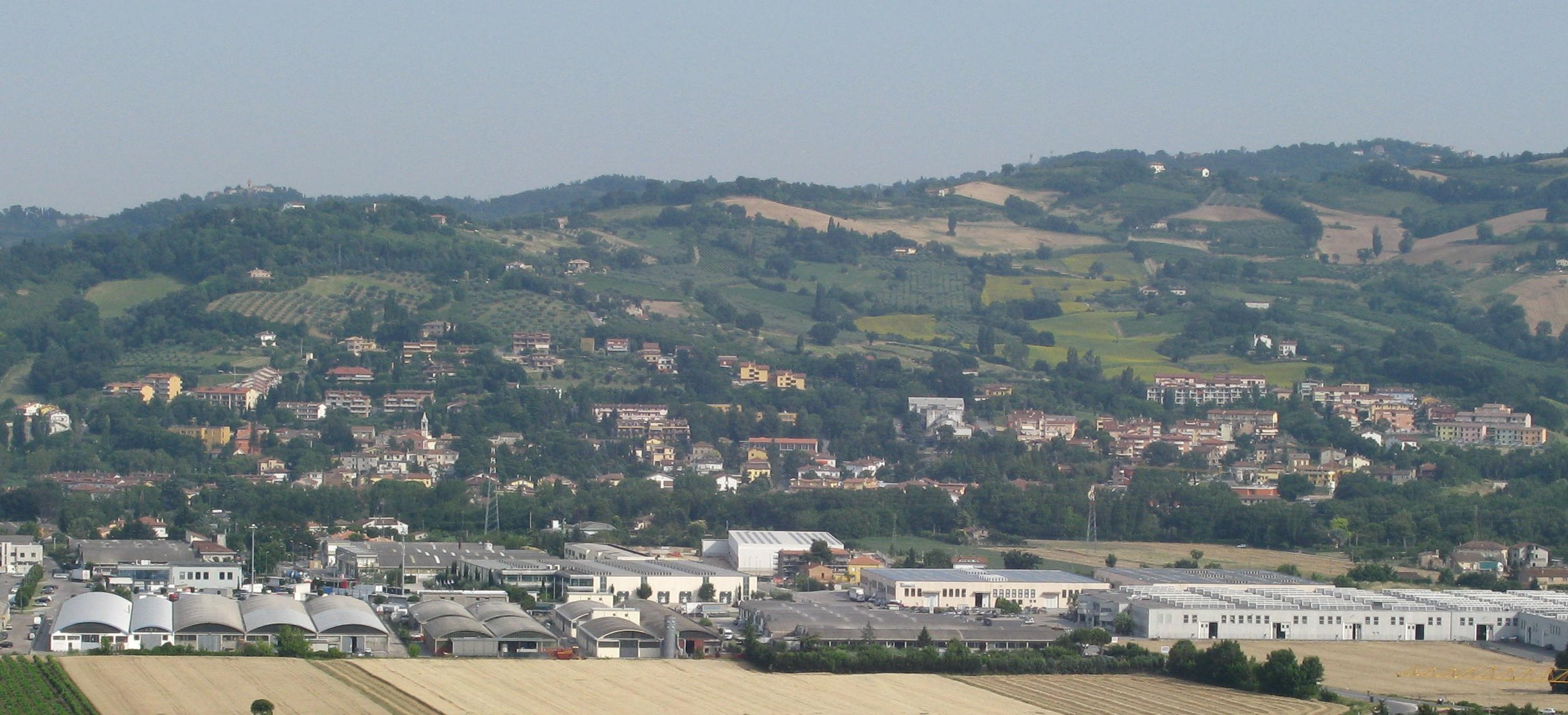
- View of Montelabbate

- Location within Italy Location within Marche
- Coordinates: 43°51′N 12°47′E
- Country: Italy
- Region: Marche
- Province: Pesaro e Urbino (PU)
- Frazioni: Montelabbate, Apsella, Osteria Nuova, Farneto, and Ripe

Government
  - Mayor: Cinzia Ferri

Area
  - Total: 19.6 km^{2} (7.6 sq mi)
- Elevation: 65 m (213 ft)

Population (31 October 2020)
  - Total: 7,013
  - Density: 358/km^{2} (927/sq mi)
- Demonym: Montelabbatesi
- Time zone: UTC+1 (CET)
  - Summer (DST): UTC+2 (CEST)
- Postal code: 61025
- Dialing code: 0721
- Website: Official website

Montelabbate is a comune (municipality) in the Province of Pesaro e Urbino in the Italian region Marche, located about 60 kilometres (37 mi) northwest of Ancona and about 12 kilometres (7 mi) southwest of Pesaro.

Montelabbate borders the following municipalities: Colbordolo, Pesaro, Sant'Angelo in Lizzola, Tavullia, Urbino, Vallefoglia.
