= Montegridolfo =

- Comune
- Comune di Montegridolfo
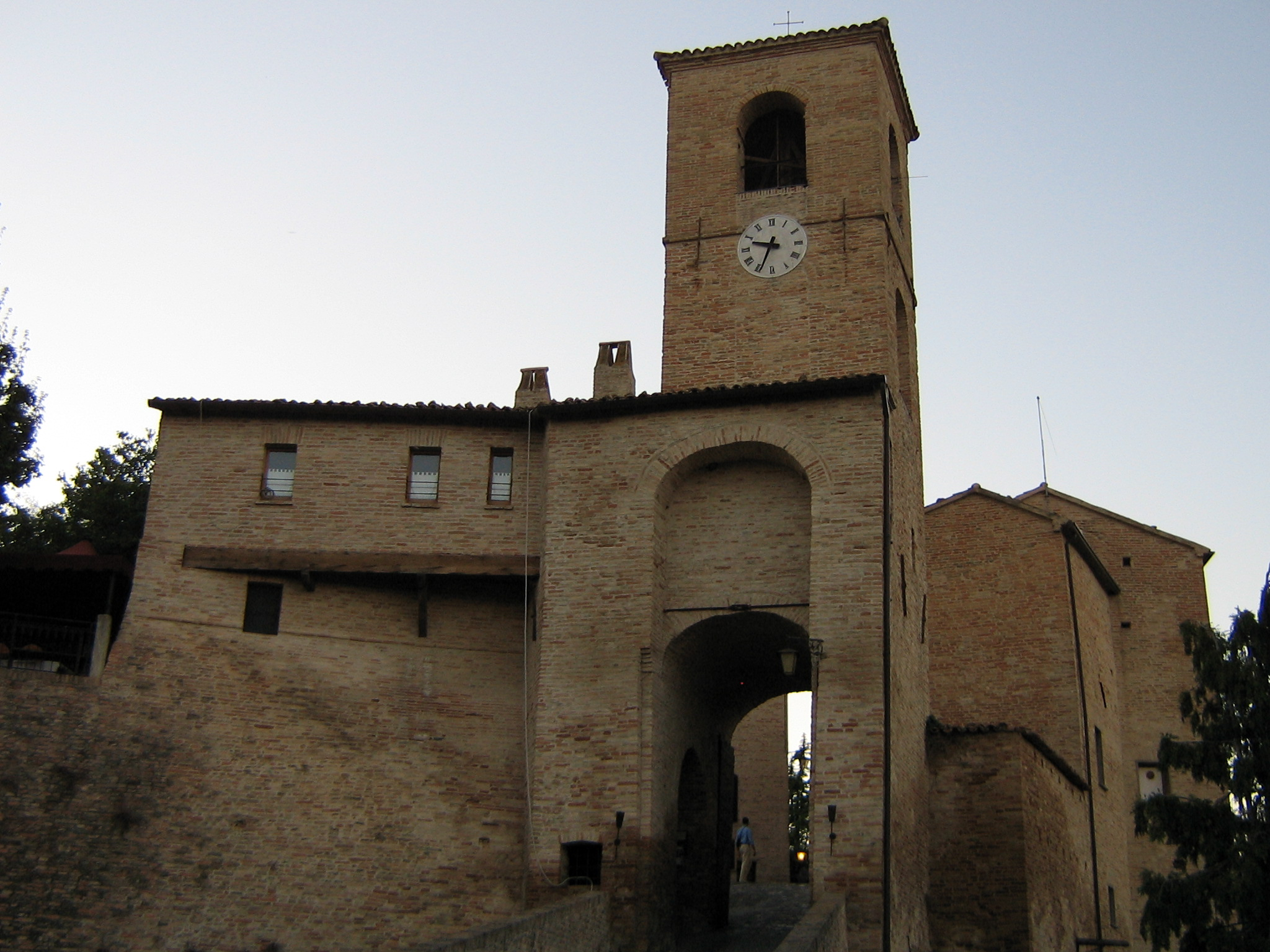
- Porta del Cassero ("Castle's Gate").

- Location within Italy Location within Emilia-Romagna
- Coordinates: 43°52′N 12°41′E
- Country: Italy
- Region: Emilia-Romagna
- Province: Rimini (RN)
- Frazioni: Ca'baldo, San Pietro, Trebbio, Ca'Fornaci, Pozze

Government
  - Mayor: Renzi Alessandro

Area
  - Total: 6.8 km^{2} (2.6 sq mi)
- Elevation: 290 m (950 ft)

Population (10 October 2011)
  - Total: 1,029
  - Density: 150/km^{2} (390/sq mi)
- Demonym: Montegridolfesi
- Time zone: UTC+1 (CET)
  - Summer (DST): UTC+2 (CEST)
- Postal code: 47837
- Dialing code: 0541
- Patron saint: St. Roch
- Saint day: August 16
- Website: Official website

Montegridolfo (Romagnol: Mun't Gridòlf) is a comune (municipality) in the Province of Rimini in the Italian region Emilia-Romagna, located about 130 kilometres (81 mi) southeast of Bologna and about 20 kilometres (12 mi) southeast of Rimini. It is one of I Borghi più belli d'Italia ("The most beautiful villages of Italy"), an association of small Italian towns deemed worthy of visiting.

The municipality of Montegridolfo contains the frazioni (subdivisions, mainly villages and hamlets) Cabaldo, San Pietro, and Trebbio. Montegridolfo borders the following municipalities: Mondaino, Saludecio, Sant'Angelo in Lizzola, Tavullia. The town itself is surrounded by fortified city walls and at its entrance is a tower and gateway from the medieval times.

== History ==
In the Middle Ages, Montegridolfo was a cassero (fortified burg, known from 1148) fought over by the Montefeltro and Malatesta families. In 1137 it was largely rebuilt to its present state after being destroyed by Ferrantino Novello Malatesta, who had allied with the Montefeltro. After a short period under Cesare Borgia, it was acquired by the Republic of Venice, which in turn ceded it to the Papal States in the early 1509–10.

During World War II, Montegridolfo was across the Gothic Line.

On December 16, 1976, Montegridolfo was declared an important hamlet by the Italian government.

== City walls ==
The town's defensive walls were built by the Malatesta family. They completely encircle the town, with the only entrance a tower and gate that dates to the 16th century.

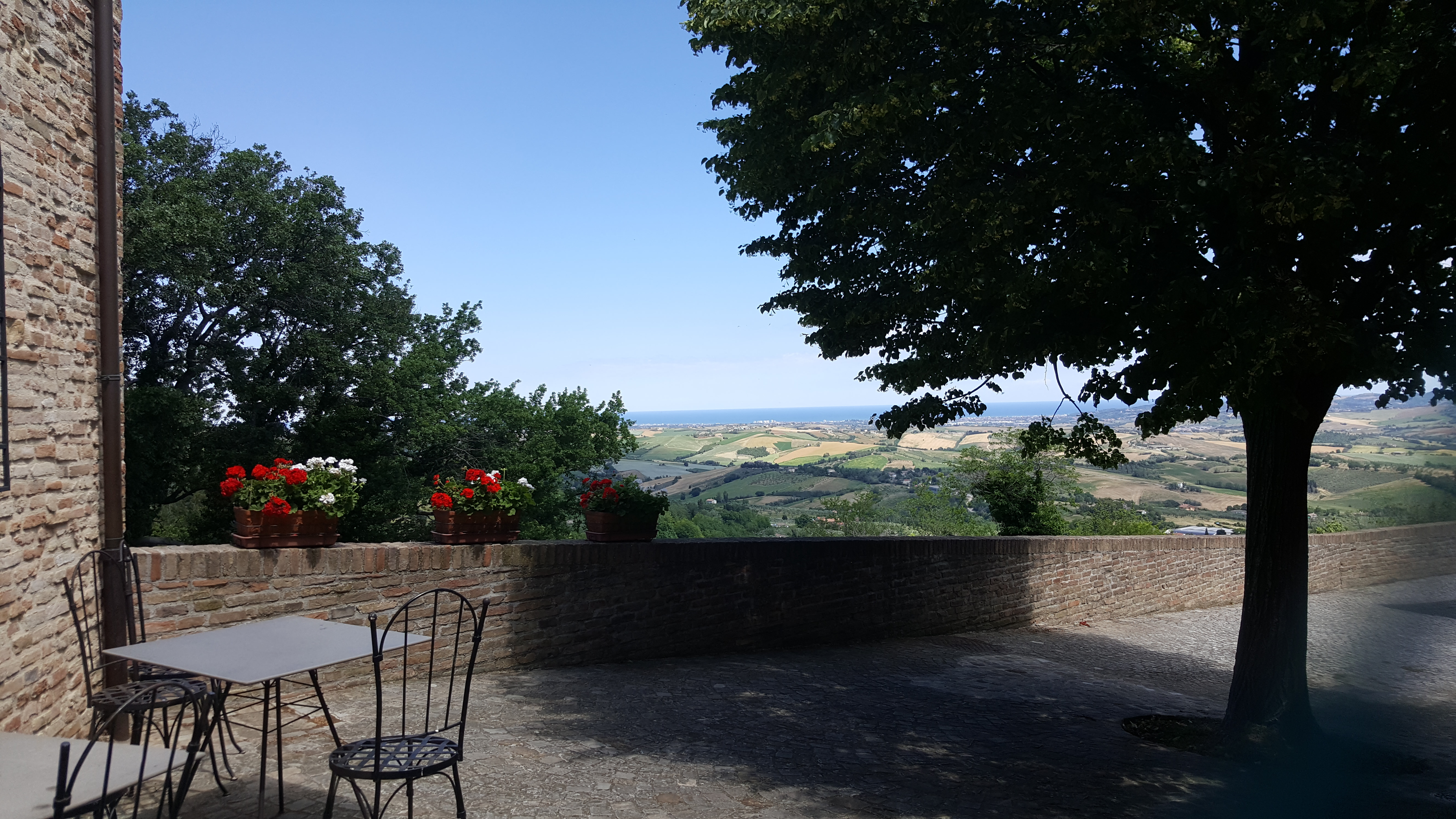
The city walls

== Main sights ==
Outside the city walls is the Church of San Rocco, located next to a former leper hospital. It houses three paintings of Madonna with Child with Saints Roch and Sebastian from different ages (early 15th century, c. 1520 and 1623).

The Museum of the Gothic Line (Italian: Museo della Linea dei Goti) is dedicated to Gerard Ross Norton.

The sanctuary of Beata Vergine delle Grazie, in the frazione of Trebbio has a 1549 painting by Pompeo Morganti.

== Demographic evolution ==
Historical population

Year	Pop.	±%
1861	926	—
1871	1,005	+8.5%
1881	1,058	+5.3%
1901	1,100	+4.0%
1911	1,248	+13.5%

Year	Pop.	±%
1921	1,269	+1.7%
1931	1,215	−4.3%
1936	1,248	+2.7%
1951	1,167	−6.5%
1961	1,041	−10.8%

Year	Pop.	±%
1971	868	−16.6%
1981	874	+0.7%
1991	874	+0.0%
2001	930	+6.4%

Source: Data from ISTAT
