= Giovanni Santi =

Italian painter and poet (c. 1435–1494)

- Born: c. 1435; Colbordolo, Duchy of Urbino, Italy
- Died: August 1, 1494 (aged 58–59); Italy
- Children: Raphael

Giovanni Santi (c. 1435 – 1 August 1494) was an Italian painter and poet, father of Raphael Sanzio. He was born in 1435 at Colbordolo in the Duchy of Urbino. He studied under Piero della Francesca and was influenced by Fiorenzo di Lorenzo. He was court painter to the Duke of Urbino and painted several altarpieces among other things. He died in Urbino.

== Life and painting ==
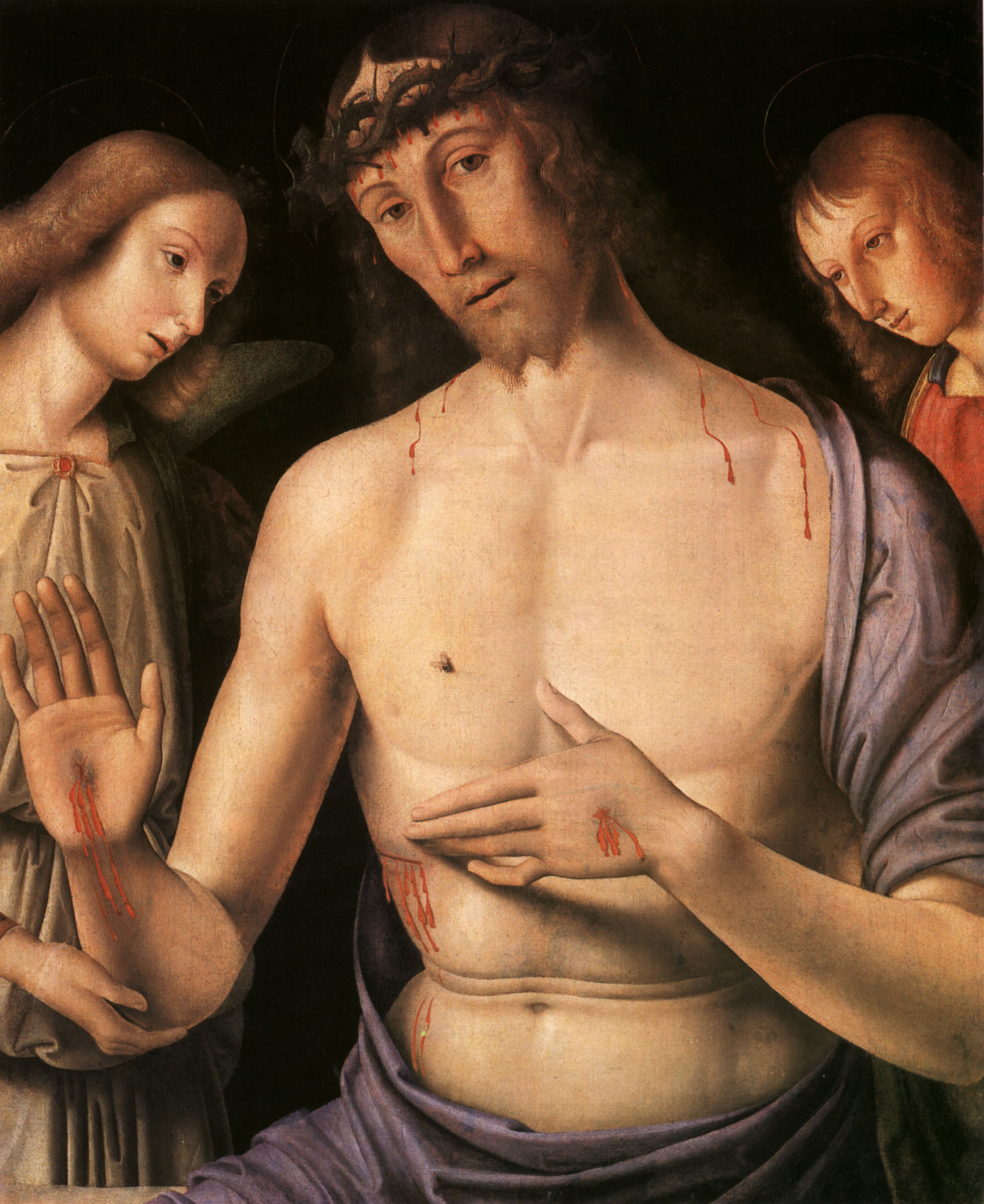
Christ supported by two angels, c. 1490 (Museum of Fine Arts, Budapest

Santi was born in 1435 at Colbordolo in the Duchy of Urbino to Sante di Peruzzolo and Elisabetta di Matteo. He was a petty merchant for a time; he then studied under Piero della Francesca. He was influenced by Fiorenzo di Lorenzo, and seems to have been an assistant and friend of Melozzo da Forlì. He was court painter to Duke of Urbino Federico da Montefeltro and painted several altarpieces, two now in the Berlin Museum, a Madonna in the church of San Francesco in Urbino, one at the church of Santa Croce in Fano, one in the National Gallery at London, and another in the gallery at Urbino; an Annunciation at the Brera in Milan; a resurrected Christ in the Museum of Fine Arts, Budapest; and a Jerome in the Lateran.

The reputation of the court had been established by Federico da Montefeltro. The emphasis of Federico's court was more literary than artistic, but Santi was a poet of sorts as well as a painter, and had written a rhymed chronicle of the life of Federico, and both wrote the texts and produced the decor for masque-like court entertainments. His poem to Federico shows him as keen to show awareness of the most advanced North Italian painters, and Early Netherlandish artists as well. In the very small court of Urbino he was probably more integrated into the central circle of the ruling family than most court painters.

Federico, who died in 1482, was succeeded by his son Guidobaldo da Montefeltro, who married Elisabetta Gonzaga. Under them, the court continued as a centre for literary culture. In 1483, Santi's son Raphael was born. Santi died in Urbino in 1494.

== Poetry and list of 15th-century painters ==
His poetry includes an epic in honor of one of his patrons, Federico da Montefeltro, followed by a discourse on painting. The event commemorates a visit to Mantua, where the Duke marveled at the skill of Andrea Mantegna, he then goes on to comment that "In this splendid and gentle art/ so many have been famous in our century/ that it make others seem destitute".

Santi then goes on to list famous names in painting, as known to him, this constitutes a remarkably concise list of 27 prominent painters of late 15th-century Italy and the Flanders, as one painter would have known. Santi's list reproduced in no order:

- Fra Angelico
- Domenico Ghirlandaio
- Piero and Antonio del Pollaiuolo
- Sandro Botticelli
- Leonardo da Vinci
- Filippino Lippi
- Pietro Perugino
- Luca Signorelli
- Gentile Bellini
- Giovanni Bellini
- Andrea Mantegna
- Andrea del Castagno
- Cosimo Tura
- Piero della Francesca
- Ercole de' Roberti
- Francesco di Pesello or Pesellino
- Masaccio
- Paolo Uccello
- Pisanello
- Domenico Veneziano
- Melozzo da Forlì
- Gentile da Fabriano
- Antonello da Messina
- Jan van Eyck
- Rogier van der Weyden
