= Giorgio Tornati =

Italian politician

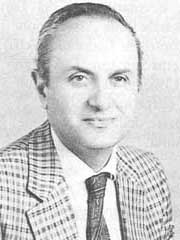

Member of the Senate
- In office 9 July 1987 – 22 April 1992

Mayor of Pesaro
- In office 1978–1987
- Preceded by: Marcello Stefanini
- Succeeded by: Aldo Amati

Personal details
- Born: 5 November 1937 (age 88) Pesaro, Marche, Italy
- Party: Italian Communist Party

Giorgio Tornati (born 5 November 1937) is an Italian politician who served as a Senator (1987–1992) and Mayor of Pesaro for three terms (1978–1980, 1980–1985, 1985–1987).

== Biography ==
In 1965, he served as a city councilor in Pesaro. Beginning in 1968, he served as councilor for public works, sports, and public housing in the administration led by Mayor Giorgio De Sabbata.

From 1975 to 1978, he served as secretary of the Provincial Federation of the Italian Communist Party in Pesaro and Urbino.

Giorgio Tornati served as mayor of Pesaro from 1978 to 1987.

He was elected to the Senate of the Republic (Italy) on the Italian Communist Party ticket from 1987 to 1992. As a senator, he served on the 13th Standing Committee (Territory, Environment, and Environmental Assets) from August 1, 1987, to September 27, 1989, and from September 27, 1989, to April 22, 1992, a member of the Executive Committee of the Communist Group from September 17, 1987, to August 2, 1989, and a member of the Committee on European Communities Affairs from August 1, 1987, to April 22, 1992.

In 1999, he ran for mayor of Pesaro as a candidate for the Democrats, receiving 8.6% of the vote.
