= Matteo Ricci (politician) =

Italian politician (born 1974)

Matteo Ricci MEP
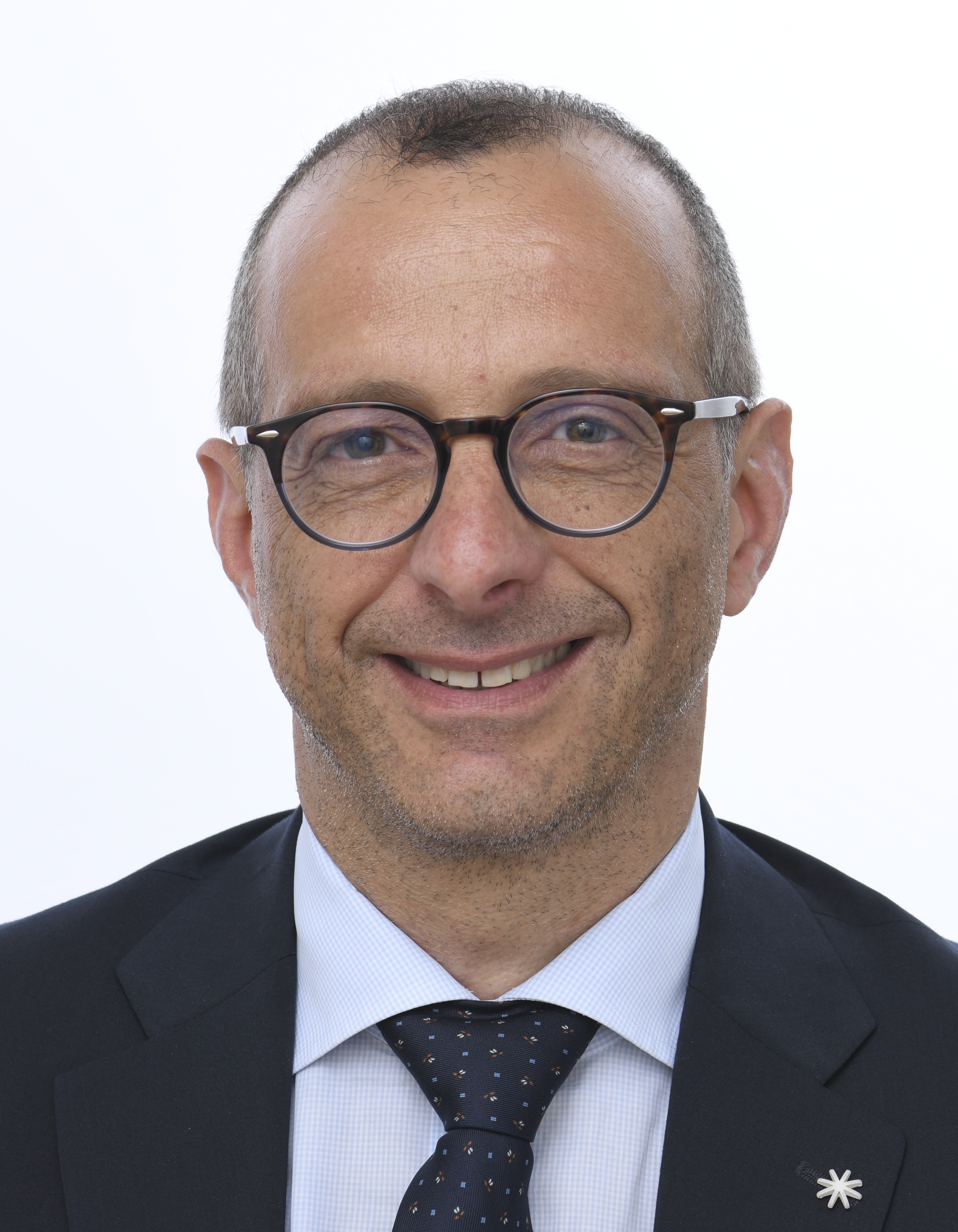

Member of the European Parliament for Central Italy
- Incumbent
- Assumed office 16 July 2024
- Parliamentary group: S&D

Mayor of Pesaro
- In office 30 May 2014 – 13 June 2024
- Preceded by: Luca Ceriscioli
- Succeeded by: Andrea Biancani

President of the Province of Pesaro and Urbino
- In office 8 June 2009 – 23 June 2014
- Preceded by: Palmiro Ucchielli
- Succeeded by: Daniele Tagliolini

Personal details
- Born: 18 July 1974 (age 52) Pesaro, Italy
- Party: PD (since 2007); DS (1999–2007)
- Education: University of Urbino
- Profession: Politician

Matteo Ricci (born 18 July 1974) is an Italian politician and former mayor of Pesaro. He began his career in the Democrats of the Left (DS). From 2009 to 2014, he was also the president of the province of Pesaro and Urbino with the Democratic Party (PD). After being elected mayor in 2014, he was re-elected in 2019.

== Early life and education ==
Ricci was born in Pesaro, in the Marche region of Central Italy. He graduated in political science at the University of Urbino.

== Career ==
Ricci began his political career in the DS. He then joined the PD and served as president of the province of Pesaro and Urbino from 2009 to 2014. He was elected mayor of Pesaro on 25 May 2014 in the first round, with 60 percent of the votes, and took office on 30 May 2014. In November 2014, Ricci was elected to the board of ANCI, of which he also became vice-president with responsibility for reforms. From 15 December 2013 to 7 May 2017, he was the PD vice-president under the leadership of Matteo Renzi. In October 2016, he took on responsibility for the party's Local Authorities, and also joined the national secretariat. In 2019, Ricci was re-elected in the first round for a second term as mayor of Pesaro with 57 percent of the votes.

Term-limited in 2024, Ricci ran for the European Parliament on the PD list in Central Italy constituency. He received 105 841 preference votes and was elected.

=== 2025 Marche presidential campaign ===
Ricci is running in the 2025 regional election to become the President of Marche, leading the centre-left "Alleanza del Cambiamento", an alliance of 19 parties and civic lists, including the PD, M5S, Italia Viva, PRC, +Europa, Volt and Europa Verde.

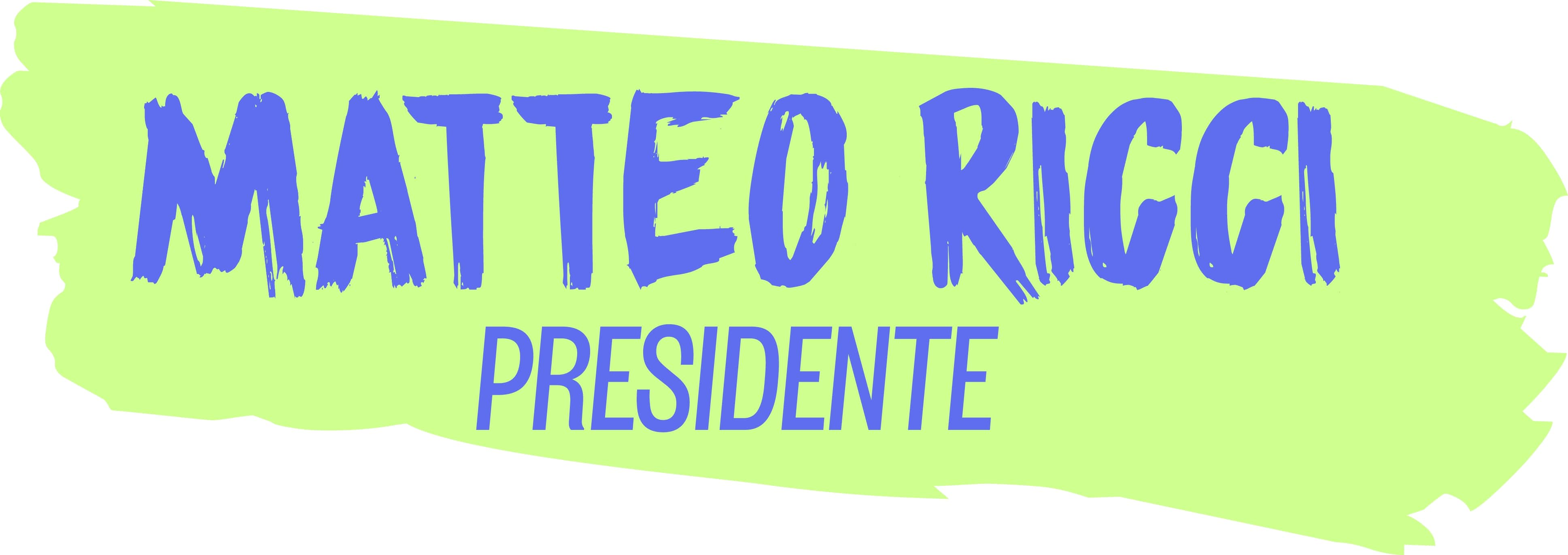
2025 presidential campaign slogan of Matteo Ricci

Ricci conceded the race to Acquaroli by 8 points, while having support concentrated in northern Marche, particularly in Ancona and his hometown of Pesaro. In Southern Marche, he won in just 13 municipalities, including Grottammare and Monteprandone, both with populations over 10,000.

After the election, he chose not to take his seat in the regional council, and remained in the European Parliament.

== Electoral history ==
2009 President of the Province of Pesaro and Urbino election
Party	Candidate	Votes	%
Democratic Party	Matteo Ricci	114,584	52.05%
People of Freedom	Roberto Giannotti	60,294	27.39%
Lega Nord	Giorgio Cancellieri	20,459	9.29%
Union of the Centre	Marcello Mei	11,130	5.06%
Bresciani Presidente	Antonio Bresciani	5,585	2.54%
La Destra / Altri	Giacomo Rossi	4,023	1.83%
Italia Centro	Fabrizio Dini	2,587	1.18%
Forza Nuova	Davide Ditommaso	1,484	0.67%
Total votes		220,146	100.00%

2014 Pesaro mayoral election
Party	Candidate	Votes	%
Democratic Party	Matteo Ricci	32,068	60.51%
Centre-right	Roberta Crescentini	9,472	17.87%
Five Star Movement	Fabrizio Pazzaglia	8,707	16.43%
Total votes		(see source for full list and totals)	100.00%

2019 Pesaro mayoral election
Party	Candidate	Votes	%
Democratic Party	Matteo Ricci	30,573	57.32%
Centre-right	Nicola Baiocchi	15,948	29.90%
Five Star Movement	Francesca Frenquellucci	4,967	9.31%
Total votes		(see source for full list and totals)	100.00%

2024 — Central Italy constituency (selected PD preferences)
Party	Candidate	Votes	%
Democratic Party	Elly Schlein	171,114	
Democratic Party	Nicola Zingaretti	130,210	
Democratic Party	Dario Nardella	118,784	
Democratic Party	Matteo Ricci	105,841	
Democratic Party	Camilla Laureti	64,095	
Democratic Party	Marco Tarquinio	43,445	
Total votes		(full circoscrizione results and all candidate preferences available at the cited source)	100.00%

2025 President of Marche election
Party	Candidate	Votes	%
Brothers of Italy	Francesco Acquaroli	337,679	52.43%
Democratic Party	Matteo Ricci	286,209	44.44%
Total votes		(see official regional tally and media summaries)	100.00%

== See also ==
- 2014 Italian local elections
- 2019 Italian local elections

Political offices
Preceded by Luca Ceriscioli	Mayor of Pesaro; 2014–2024	Succeeded by Andrea Biancani
Preceded by Palmiro Ucchielli	President of the Province of Pesaro and Urbino; 2009–2014	Succeeded by Daniele Tagliolini
