= André Todescato =

Brazilian footballer (born 1982)

Personal information
- Full name: André Todescato Caibi
- Date of birth: October 21, 1982 (age 44)
- Place of birth: Caxias do Sul, Brazil
- Height: 1.81 m (5 ft 11 in)
- Position: Defender

Senior career*
Years	Team	Apps	(Gls)
1998–2003	Esporte Clube Juventude	-	(-)
2004	América Futebol Clube (MG)	-	(-)
2004	Clube do Remo	-	(-)
2005	Vall de Uxó	-	(-)
2005–2006	CD Leganés	-	(-)
2006	NK Zadar	-	(-)
2007	AGOVV	13	(0)
2008–2009	Skonto FC	18	(0)
2009	FC Politehnica Iași	3	(0)
2010	Real Montecchio	-	(-)
2011	Murata	5	(3)
2012–2013	Esportivo	-	(-)
2012	→ Esporte Clube Internacional (loan)	-	(-)
- * Club domestic league appearances and goals as of 15 March 2019

André Todescato (born October 21, 1982) is a Brazilian former footballer. He also holds an Italian passport.
