= Montecalvo in Foglia =

- Comune
- Comune di Montecalvo in Foglia
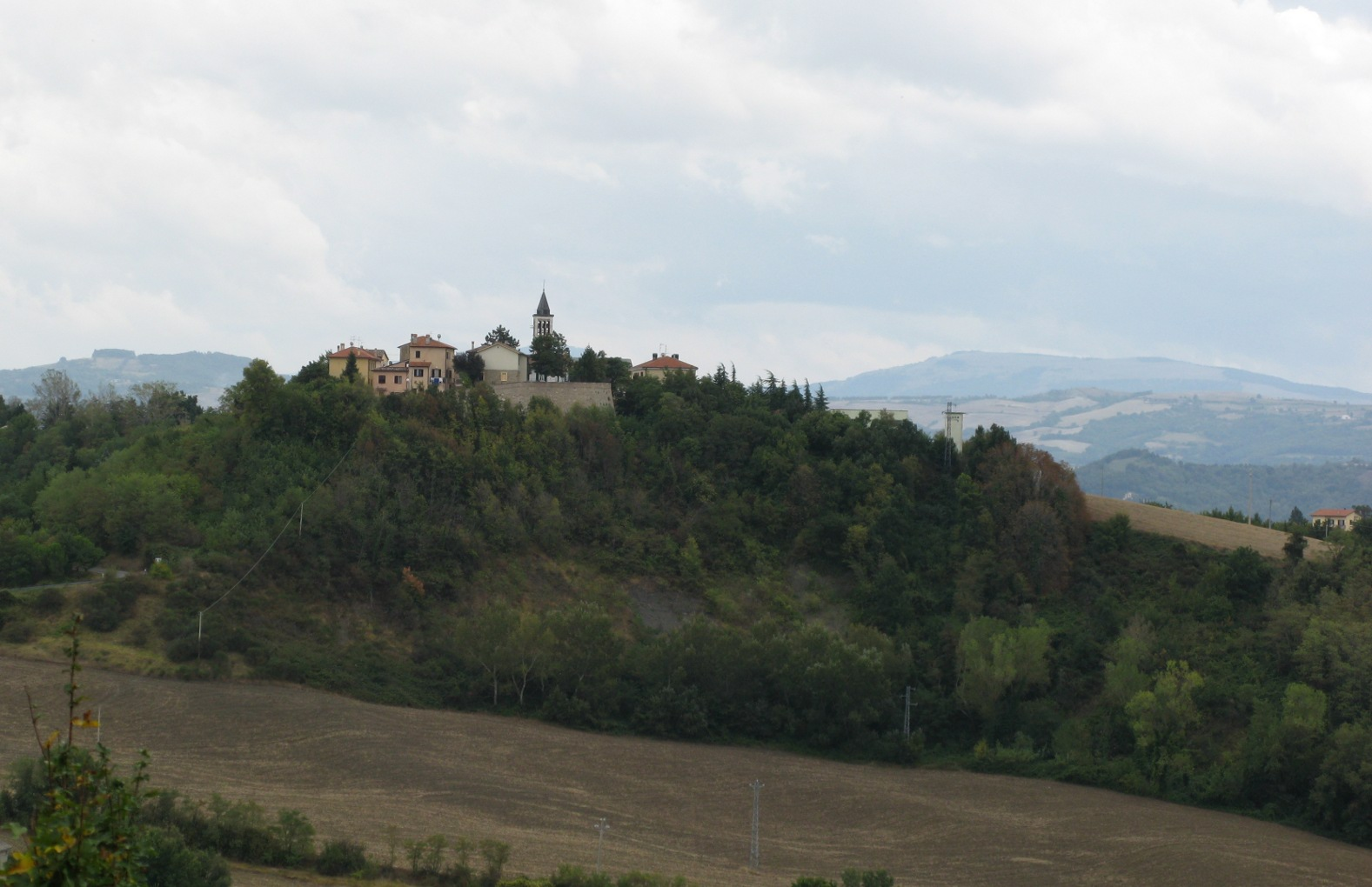
- View of Montecalvo in Foglia

- Coat of arms

- Location within Italy Location within Marche
- Coordinates: 43°49′N 12°38′E
- Country: Italy
- Region: Marche
- Province: Pesaro e Urbino (PU)
- Frazioni: Borgo Massano, Ca' Gallo

Government
  - Mayor: Donatella Paganelli

Area
  - Total: 18.2 km^{2} (7.0 sq mi)
- Elevation: 345 m (1,132 ft)

Population (30 November 2017)
  - Total: 2,747
  - Density: 151/km^{2} (391/sq mi)
- Demonym: Montecalvesi
- Time zone: UTC+1 (CET)
  - Summer (DST): UTC+2 (CEST)
- Postal code: 61020
- Dialing code: 0722
- Patron saint: St. Nicholas
- Saint day: 6 December
- Website: Official website

Montecalvo in Foglia is a comune (municipality) in the Province of Pesaro e Urbino in the Italian region Marche, located about 70 kilometres (43 mi) northwest of Ancona and about 25 kilometres (16 mi) southwest of Pesaro.

Montecalvo in Foglia borders the following municipalities: Mondaino, Tavullia, Urbino, Vallefoglia.
