= Tavullia =

- Comune
- Comune di Tavullia
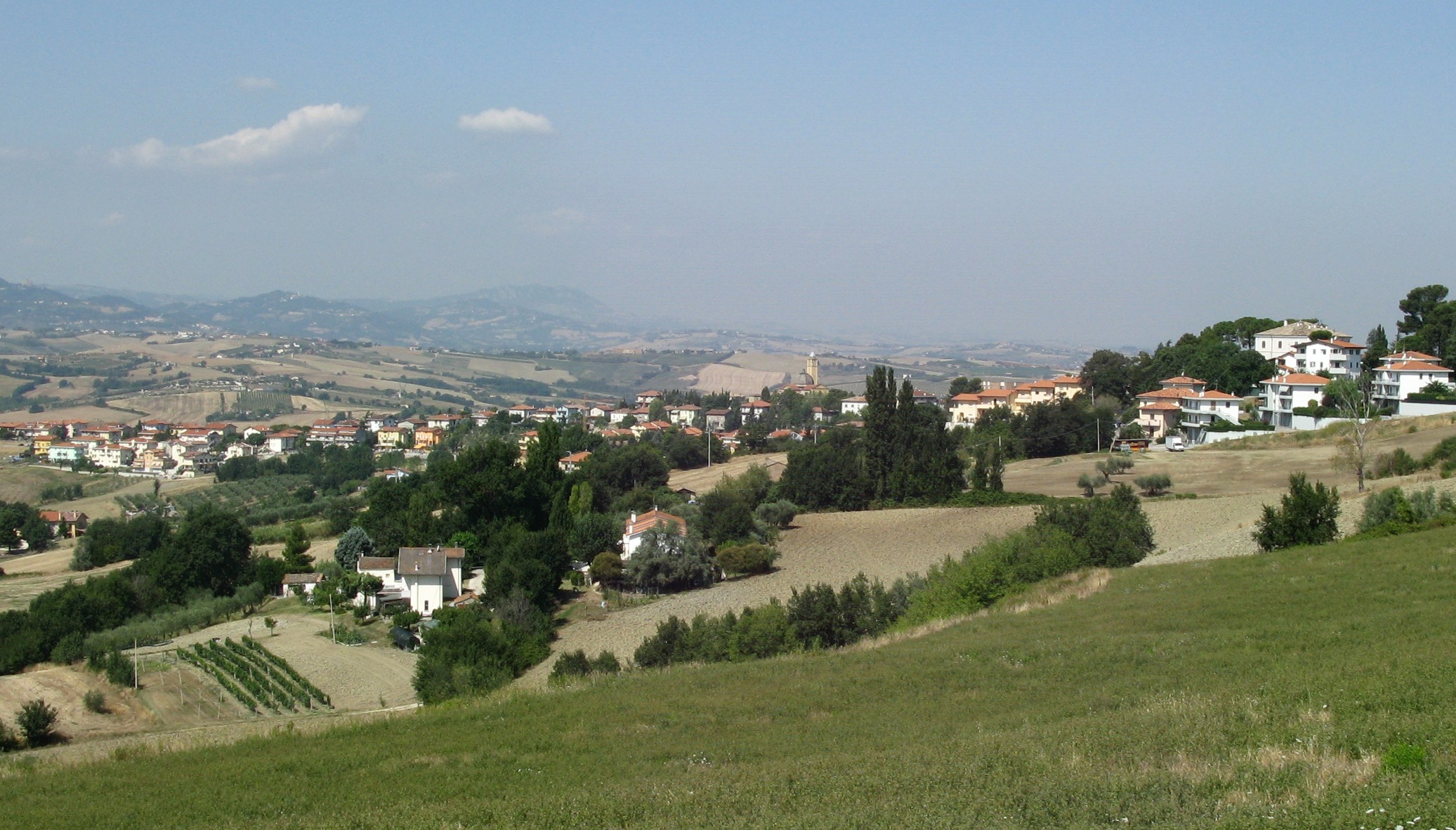
- View of Tavullia

- Location within Italy Location within Marche
- Coordinates: 43°53′53″N 12°45′09″E
- Country: Italy
- Region: Marche
- Province: Province of Pesaro e Urbino (PU)
- Frazioni: Babbucce, Belvedere Fogliense, Case Bernardi, Monteluro, Padiglione, Picciano, Pirano Alto, Pirano Basso, Rio Salso, San Germano

Government
  - Mayor: Francesca Paolucci

Area
  - Total: 42 km^{2} (16 sq mi)
- Elevation: 170 m (560 ft)

Population (30 November 2016)
  - Total: 8,001
  - Density: 190/km^{2} (490/sq mi)
- Demonym: Tavulliesi
- Time zone: UTC+1 (CET)
  - Summer (DST): UTC+2 (CEST)
- Postal code: 61010
- Dialing code: 0721
- Patron saint: St. Lawrence
- Saint day: August 10
- Website: Official website

Tavullia is a comune (municipality) in the Province of Pesaro and Urbino in the Marche region of Italy, located about 70 kilometres (43 mi) northwest of Ancona and about 15 kilometres (9 mi) southwest of Pesaro. Until 13 December 1938, it was known as Tomba di Pesaro.

Tavullia is the home town of nine-time world motorcycle champion Valentino Rossi. His family built a dirt oval racetrack close to the town. The town is considered by some to be part of the historical region of Romagna.

== Geography ==
Tavullia is 70 kilometres (43 mi) northwest of Ancona, 15 kilometres (9 mi) from Pesaro and 30 kilometres (19 mi) from Rimini. Tavullia borders the following municipalities: Gradara, Mondaino, Montecalvo in Foglia, Montegridolfo, Montelabbate, Pesaro, Saludecio, San Giovanni in Marignano, Vallefoglia.

== History ==
The area of Tavullia was likely inhabited before the Middle Ages, though the first mentioned settlement is a castle situated on the slopes of Monte Peloso, the "Castrum Montis Pilos Tumbao". It was the location of violent clashes between the Malatesta family (Guelphs who ruled over the city of Rimini) and that of Montefeltro (Ghibellines). The largest battle was fought in 1443 at Monteluro: the Sforza intervention in favor of the Malatesta led to their victory. The territory was always littered with castles, many of which are now disappeared: that of Monteluro was subject of numerous battles for its strategic importance and now only a few ruins remain.

== Gallery ==
Position of Tavullia in the Province of Pesaro and Urbino

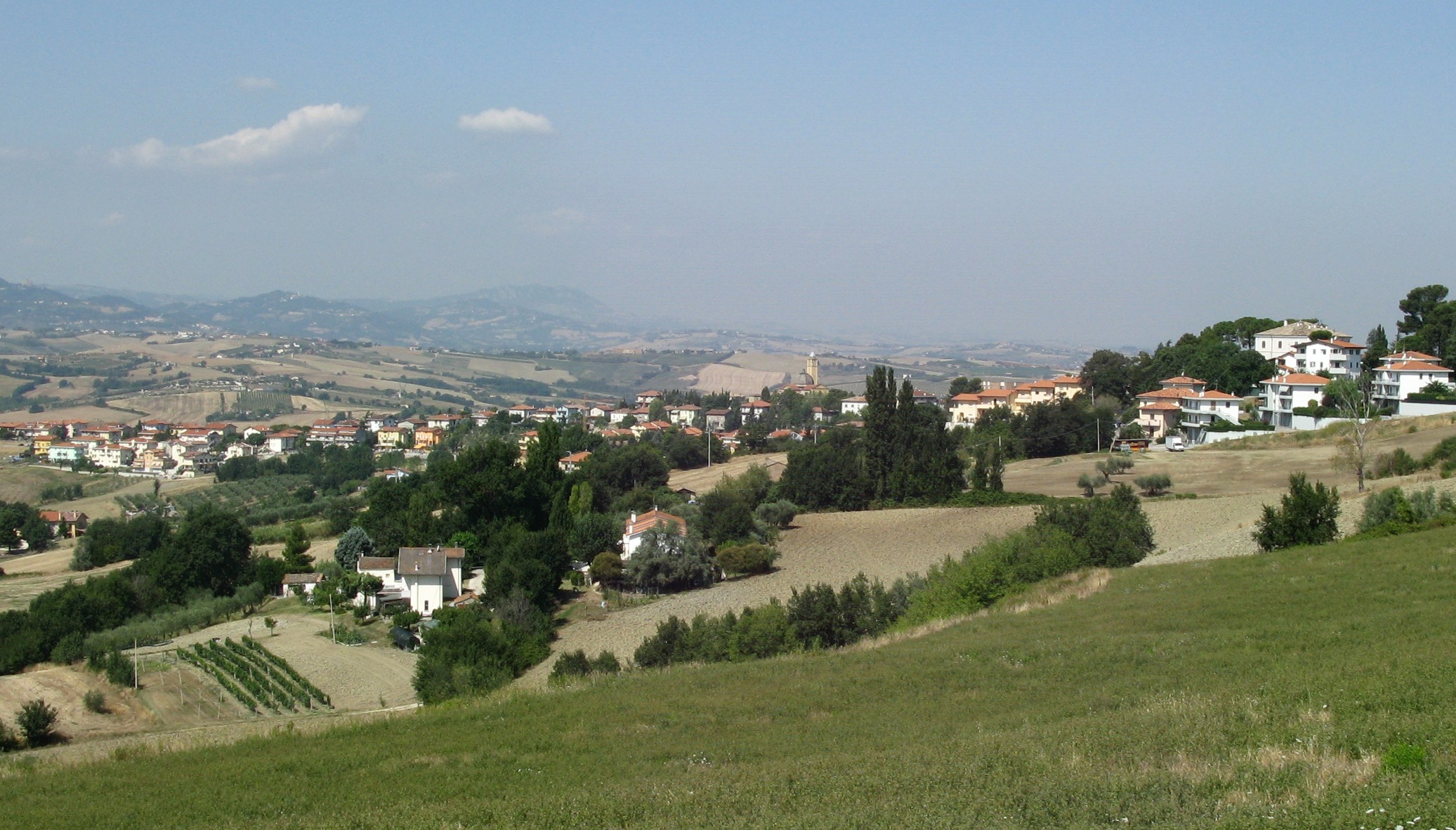
Panoramic view

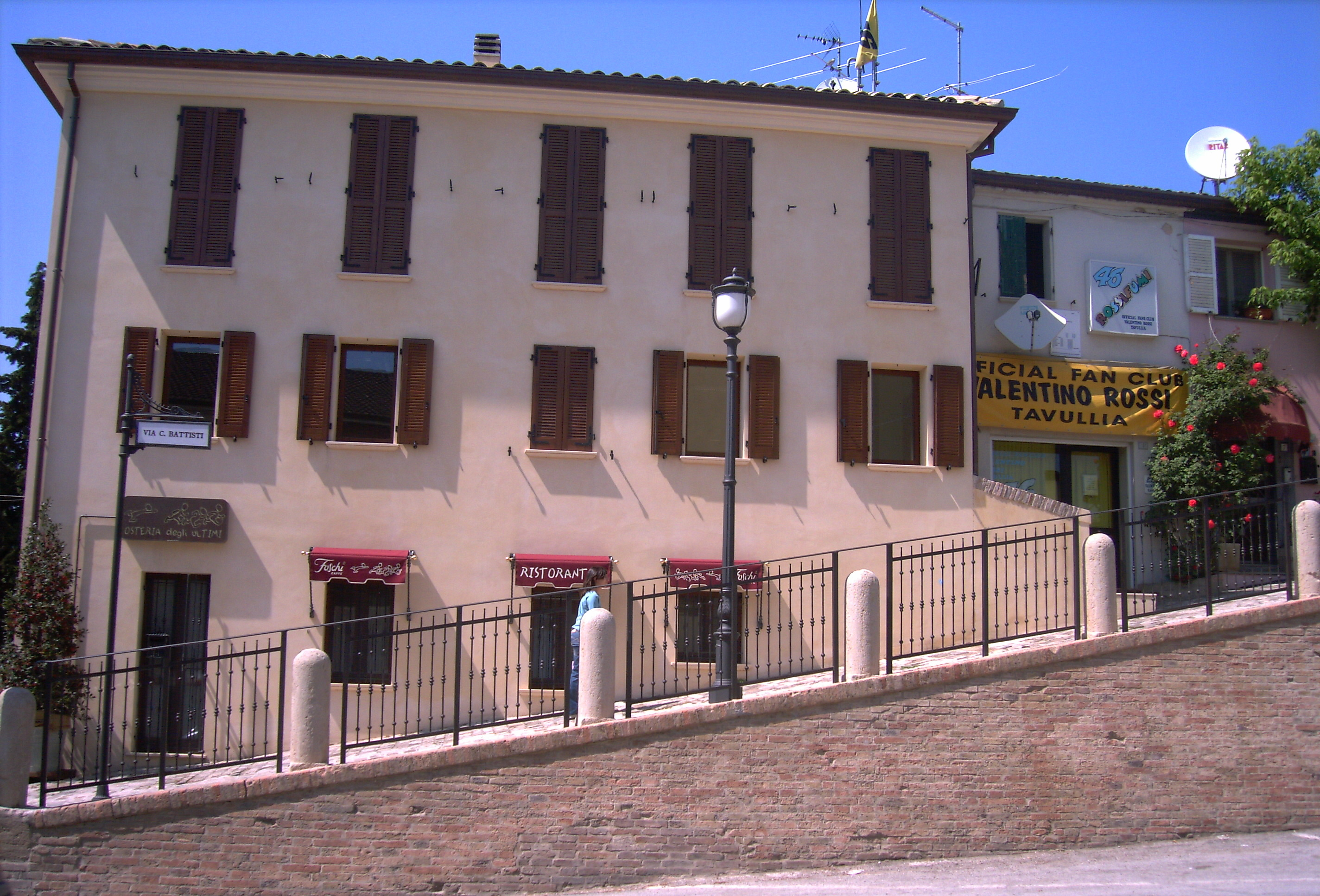
Fanshop of Valentino Rossi

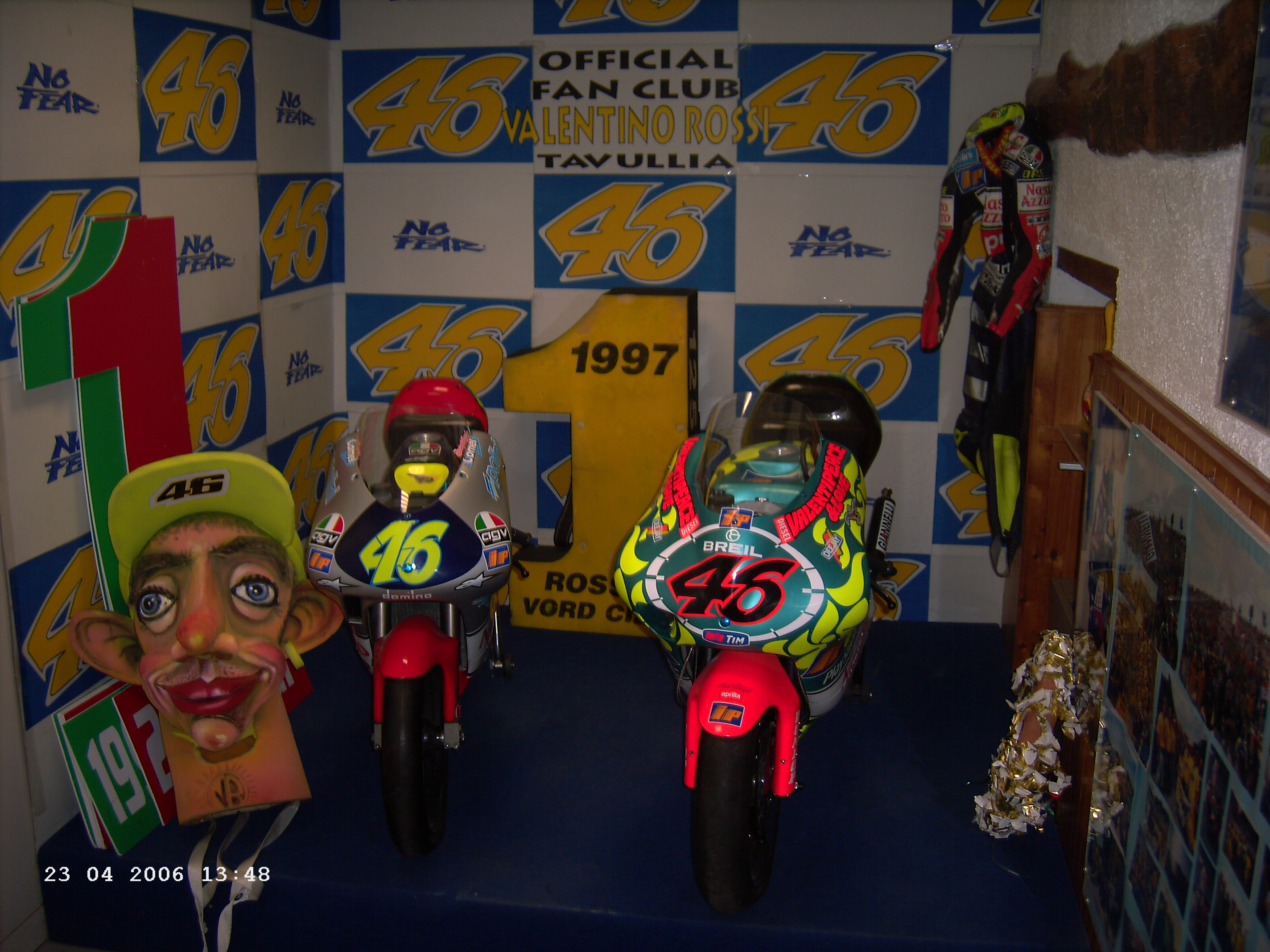
Bikes of Valentino Rossi in the fanshop

== People ==
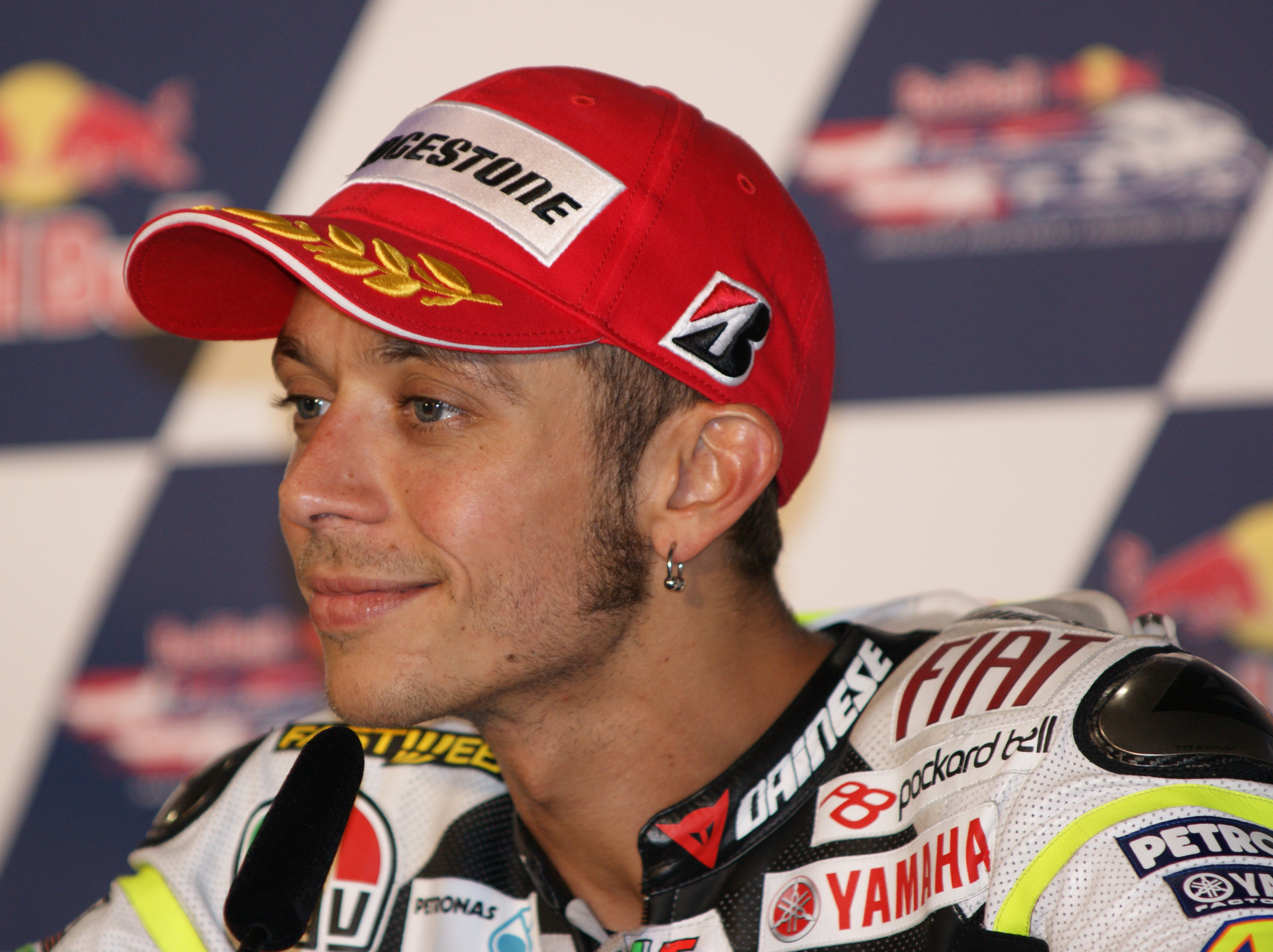
Valentino Rossi in 2010

- Valentino Rossi (1979), Motorcycle Racer 9 times World Champion.
- Graziano Rossi (1954), Motorcycle Racer and father of Valentino Rossi.
