= Oriano Giovanelli =

Italian politician

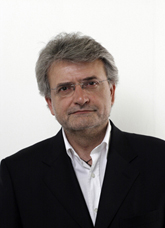

Mayor of Pesaro
- In office 28 September 1992 – 14 June 2004
- Preceded by: Aldo Amati
- Succeeded by: Luca Ceriscioli

Member of the Chamber of Deputies
- In office 3 May 2006 – 14 March 2013

Personal details
- Born: 24 December 1957 (age 68) Urbino, Marche, Italy
- Party: Italian Communist Party (1980-1991); Democratic Party of the Left (1991-1998); Democrats of the Left (1998-2007); Democratic Party (since 2007)
- Profession: employee

Oriano Giovanelli (born 24 December 1957) is an Italian politician who served as Mayor of Pesaro (1992–2004) and Deputy for two legislatures (2006–2008, 2008–2013).

Political offices
Preceded by Aldo Amati	Mayor of Pesaro; 1992–2004	Succeeded by Luca Ceriscioli
