= Mondaino =

- Comune
- Comune di Mondaino
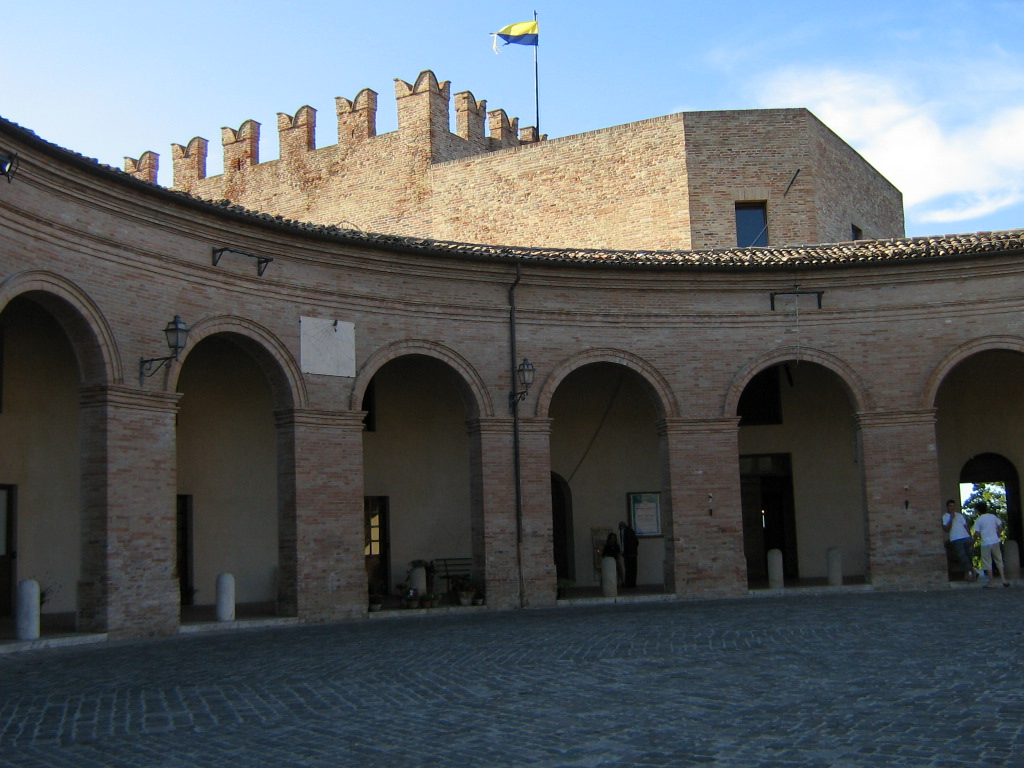

- Location within Italy Location within Emilia-Romagna
- Coordinates: 43°51′N 12°40′E
- Country: Italy
- Region: Emilia-Romagna
- Province: Rimini (RN)
- Frazioni: Pieggia, San Teodoro, Montespino, Laureto

Government
  - Mayor: Massimo Giorgi

Area
  - Total: 19.84 km^{2} (7.66 sq mi)
- Elevation: 420 m (1,380 ft)

Population (31 October 2020)
  - Total: 1,343
  - Density: 67.69/km^{2} (175.3/sq mi)
- Demonym: Mondainesi
- Time zone: UTC+1 (CET)
  - Summer (DST): UTC+2 (CEST)
- Postal code: 47836
- Dialing code: 0541
- Website: Official website

Mondaino (Romagnol: Mundaìn) is a comune (municipality) in the Province of Rimini in the Italian region Emilia-Romagna, located about 130 kilometres (81 mi) southeast of Bologna and approximately 25 kilometres (16 mi) southeast of Rimini.

Mondaino borders the following municipalities: Montecalvo in Foglia, Montefiore Conca, Montegridolfo, Saludecio, Tavoleto, Tavullia, Urbino.

The town was largely destroyed during an engagement on the Gothic Line in the Second World War.
