= Pompeo Morganti =

Italian painter

Pompeo Morganti, also known as Pompeo da Fano (circa 1494 - 1568) was an Italian painter, active in the Marche.

He was born in Fano, the son of the painter Bartolomeo Morganti, also known as Bartolomeo di Matteo de' Marescalchi. Pompeo contributed a somewhat ghostly painting depicting the Apparition of the Virgin for the Sanctuary of the Beata Vergine delle Grazie in Montegridolfo. Vasari mentions that he (Pompeo da Fano) was briefly the teacher of Taddeo Zuccaro, while others mention his father Ottaviano. He painted a Raising Lazarus and St Michael defeats Satan, now in the museum of the Art gallery of Fano.
