= Giuseppe Paolini =

Italian politician (born 1954)

President of the Province of Pesaro and Urbino
- In office 31 October 2018 – 25 May 2026
- Preceded by: Daniele Tagliolini
- Succeeded by: Alberto Alessandri

Mayor of Isola del Piano
- In office 30 March 2010 – 24 May 2026
- Preceded by: Adriano Paolo Battistoni
- Succeeded by: Massimo Bartolomeoli

Personal details
- Born: 15 May 1954 (age 72) Isola del Piano, Province of Pesaro and Urbino, Italy

Giuseppe Paolini (born 15 May 1954) is an Italian politician who served as president of the Province of Pesaro and Urbino from 2018 to 2026.

== Life and career ==
Paolini was born in Isola del Piano, in the province of Pesaro and Urbino, in 1954. In 1977 he became a founding member of the cooperative Alce Nero, together with Gino Girolomoni, one of the pioneers of organic farming in Italy.

He began his political career in 1995, when he was elected for the first time as a municipal councillor of Isola del Piano as part of a centre-left coalition. From 2000 to 2005 he served as assessor and as deputy mayor. Paolini was elected mayor of the municipality in March 2010 and was subsequently re-elected in 2015 and 2020. Together with the association Libera, he supported the creation of the Fattoria della Legalità, a project established on a confiscated property previously linked to organized crime, which became a centre for civic education and anti-mafia activities.

Paolini joined the Provincial Council of Pesaro and Urbino from 2017 to 2018. In the 2018 provincial presidential election, held on 31 October, he became president of the province, receiving 32,796 weighted votes. In February 2022, he was elected president of UPI Marche. Paolini was re-elected for a second term as president of the province on 18 December 2022. He served until his resignation in May 2026, leaving office to the vice president Laura Giombini.
