= Emidio Massi =

Italian politician

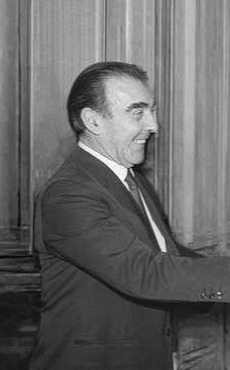
- Massi in 1987.

President of Marche
- In office 8 September 1978 – 22 July 1990
- Preceded by: Adriano Ciaffi
- Succeeded by: Rodolfo Giampaoli

Personal details
- Born: 5 August 1922 Ascoli Piceno, Marche, Italy
- Died: 13 August 2016 (aged 94) Ancona, Marche, Italy
- Party: Italian Socialist Party

Emidio Massi (5 August 1922 – 13 August 2016) was an Italian Socialist politician and former President of Marche from 1978 until 1990.

Born in Ascoli Piceno, Massi was president of Marche for 12 years, between 1978 and 1990. Previously, between 1970 and 1978, he had served as vice president of the Regional Committee and as assessor for Industry, Crafts and Labour.
