= Saludecio =

- Comune
- Comune di Saludecio
- Porta Marina.

- Coat of arms

- Location within Italy Location within Emilia-Romagna
- Coordinates: 43°52′N 12°40′E
- Country: Italy
- Region: Emilia-Romagna
- Province: Rimini (RN)
- Frazioni: Cerreto, Meleto, San Rocco, Santa Maria del Monte, Sant' Ansovino

Government
  - Mayor: Dilvo Polidori

Area
  - Total: 34.27 km^{2} (13.23 sq mi)
- Elevation: 350 m (1,150 ft)

Population (31 October 2020)
  - Total: 3,023
  - Density: 88.21/km^{2} (228.5/sq mi)
- Demonym: Saludecesi
- Time zone: UTC+1 (CET)
  - Summer (DST): UTC+2 (CEST)
- Postal code: 47835
- Dialing code: 0541
- Patron saint: Beato Amato Ronconi
- Saint day: May 8
- Website: Official website

Saludecio (Romagnol: Saludécc) is a comune (municipality) in the Province of Rimini in the Italian region Emilia-Romagna, about 130 kilometres (81 mi) southeast of Bologna and about 20 kilometres (12 mi) southeast of Rimini. It borders the municipalities of Mondaino, Montefiore Conca, Montegridolfo, Morciano di Romagna, San Giovanni in Marignano, Tavoleto and Tavullia.

== Main sights ==
- Porta Marina, a fortified gate built by Sigismondo Pandolfo Malatesta.
- Torre Civica ("Civic Tower").
- Church of San Biagio, housing 17th-century paintings by Claudio Ridolfi, Guido Cagnacci and others, as well as the remains of Saint Amato Ronconi.
- Palazzo Albini, a local palace.
- Porta Montanara, another entrance gate.
- Town Hall, built on the ruins of a former castle.
- Castle of Cerreto, a rural fortified village (burg) located in the Rimini territory.
