= Amato Ronconi =

Christian saint

Saint Amato Ronconi O.F.S.
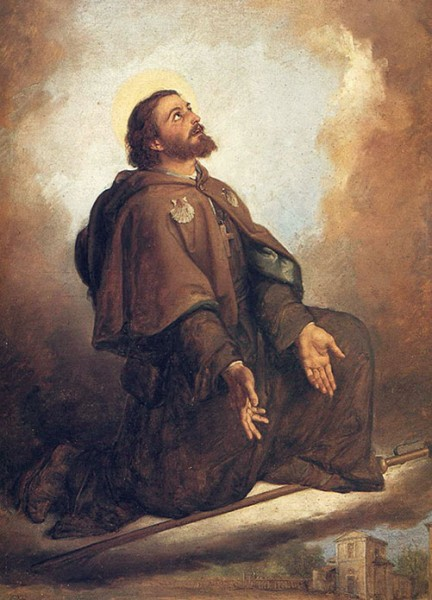

Layman
- Born: 1226; Saludecio, Papal States
- Died: 8 May 1292 (aged 67); Saludecio, Papal States
- Resting place: San Biagio, Italy
- Venerated in: Catholic Church
- Beatified: 17 April 1776, Rome, Papal States by Pope Pius VI
- Canonized: 23 November 2014, Saint Peter's Square, Vatican City by Pope Francis
- Feast: 8 May
- Attributes: Franciscan habit; Staff
- Patronage: Saludecio

Amato Ronconi (1226 – 8 May 1292) was an Italian Catholic who became a professed member of the Secular Franciscan Order. Ronconi lived a life of penitence and dedicated all his works to the poor through the construction of chapels and hospitals – one such hospital still exists in his home of Rimini. The residents in this town recognised his good deeds and hailed Ronconi as a saint in his own lifetime.

The confirmation of his popular local "cultus" – or enduring veneration – allowed for Pope Pius VI to celebrate his beatification on 17 April 1776 while Pope Francis canonized Ronconi centuries later on 23 November 2014 in Saint Peter's Square.

== Life ==
Amato Ronconi was born in 1225 in Saludecio, near Rimini, to a noble and wealthy household. He was orphaned in childhood and raised in the home of his older brother, Giacomo. As the younger son of a landowner, he had no fortune, so he worked as a farmhand. He had at least one sister named Chiara.

Ronconi's sister-in-law urged him to find a woman to wed but Ronconi had decided to serve the Lord as a hermit. His sister-in-law Lansberga came to dislike him as a result of this for she wanted him to wed her younger sister so as to keep her estate intact among familial relations and not amongst outsiders. She first asked Giacomo to have Ronconi change his mind but to keep the peace her husband gave his brother a house with a bit of land as part of his inheritance. He lived there with his sister, working the land. It was located on the road from Rimini to Rome. Ronconi turned it into a hospice for pilgrims which further infuriated his sister-in-law. Lansberga wanted revenge and so began a slanderous rumor – knowing how close he was with his sister Chiara – that both brother and sister were engaging in incestuous relations which was proven false after an investigation.

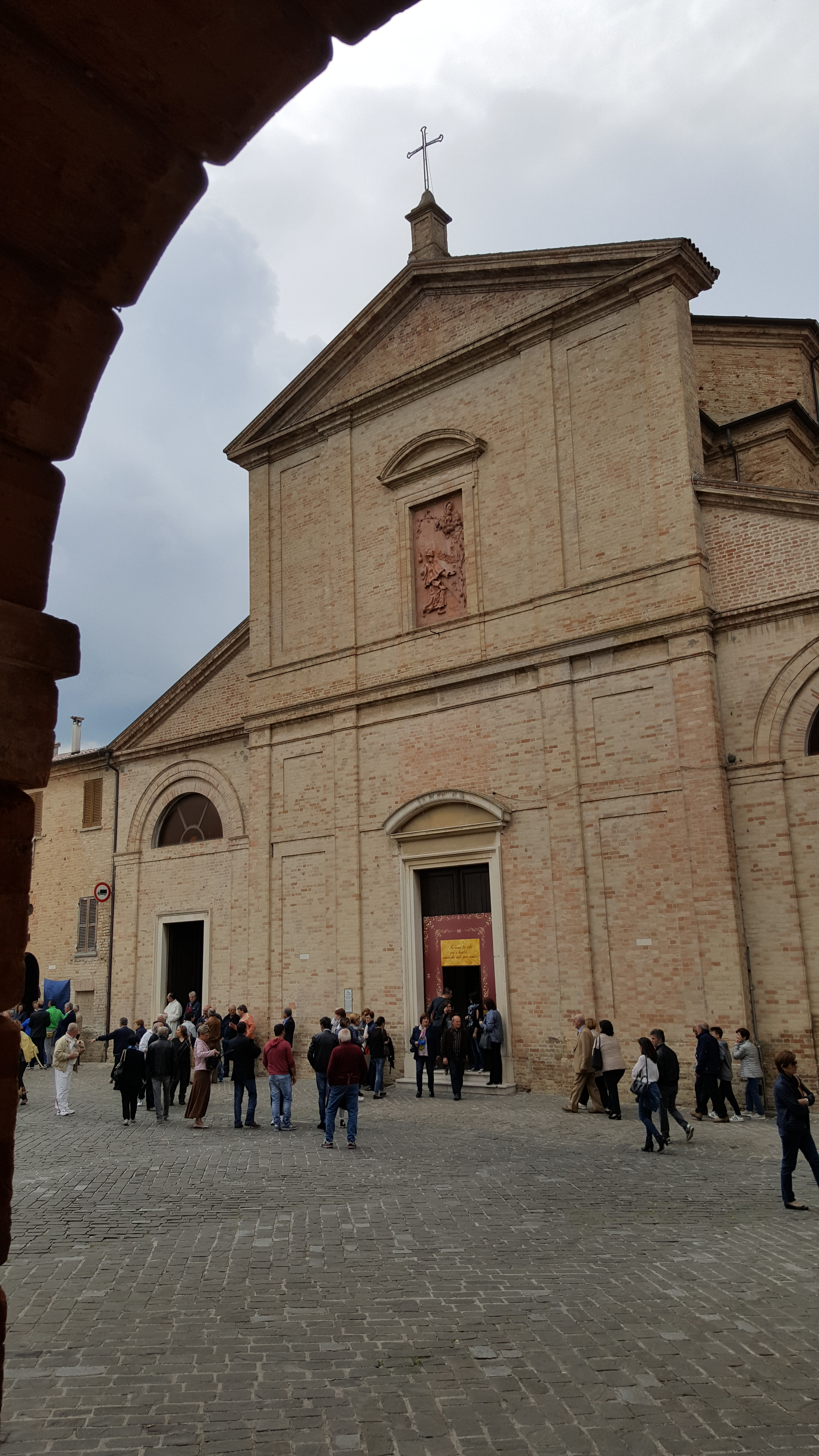
Santuario di Santo Amato Ronconi

Feeling a call to serve God he devoted his life to catering to the needs of the poor and assisting pilgrims and in doing so gave up all his possessions which he passed on to the poor people of the area. He worked the fields in order to support the hospice and the poor. He joined the Secular Franciscan Order and adopted the life of a hermit. He later emerged from his hermitage and constructed various chapels and shelters for pilgrims; some of those places still exist at present including a hospital in Rimini. The hospice is now the Casa di Riposo Pia Beato Amato Ronconi.

Ronconi made a pilgrimage to Rimini to the tomb of Gaudentius of Rimini, to Monte Titano to the cave of Marinus, and four times to Spain to visit the tomb of James the Apostle at Santiago de Compostela. Several miracles were reported on these pilgrimages. He attempted a fifth pilgrimage to Santiago de Compostela but never made it for an angel reportedly appeared to him and told him he would soon die so had to return to his home; he did so and stopped at the Benedictine convent of San Giuliano in Rimini where he gave them the remainder of his possessions on 10 January 1292.

Ronconi died in 1292. His remains are in the church of San Biagio in his home town of Saledecio after being transferred in May 1330 after his original resting place was razed due to fire.

== Canonisation ==
Pope Pius VI beatified Ronconi by the confirmation of his cult on 17 April 1776. In 1997, the parish of San Biagio in Saludécio and La Pia Unione del Beato Amato revived the process of canonisation of Amatus. Pope Francis canonized Ronconi on 23 November 2014 in Saint Peter's Square.
