= Taddeo Zuccari =

Italian painter (1529–1566)

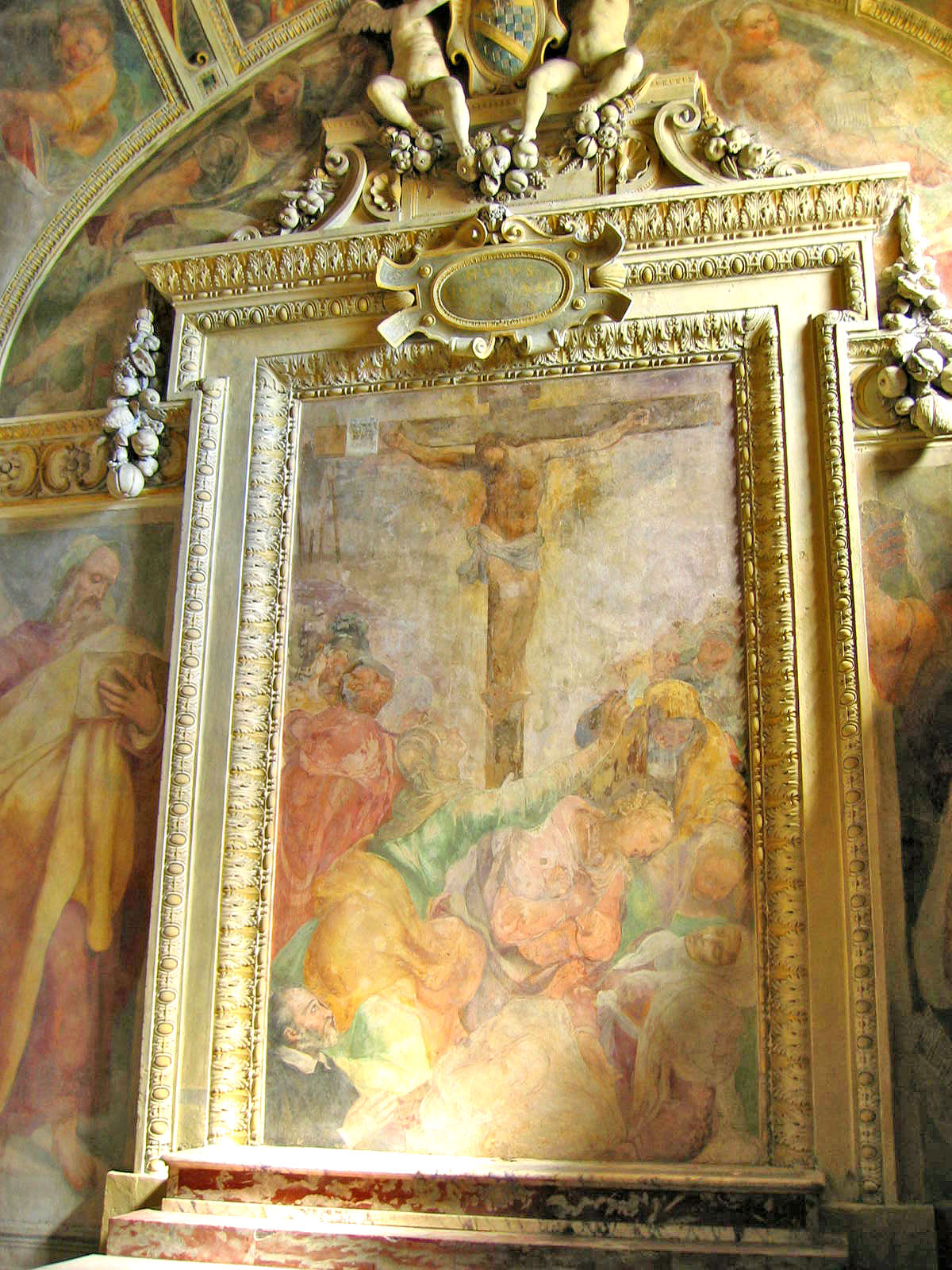
Crocifissione, Cappella Mattei, Santa Maria della Consolazione, Rome (1556)

Taddeo Zuccaro (or Zuccari) (1 September 1529 – 2 September 1566) was an Italian painter, one of the most popular members of the Roman mannerist school.

== Biography ==
Zuccaro was born in Sant'Angelo in Vado, near Urbino, the son of Ottaviano Zuccaro, an almost unknown painter. His brother Federico, born around 1540, was also a painter and architect. As a young man Taddeo was to be encouraged by Pompeo da Fano.

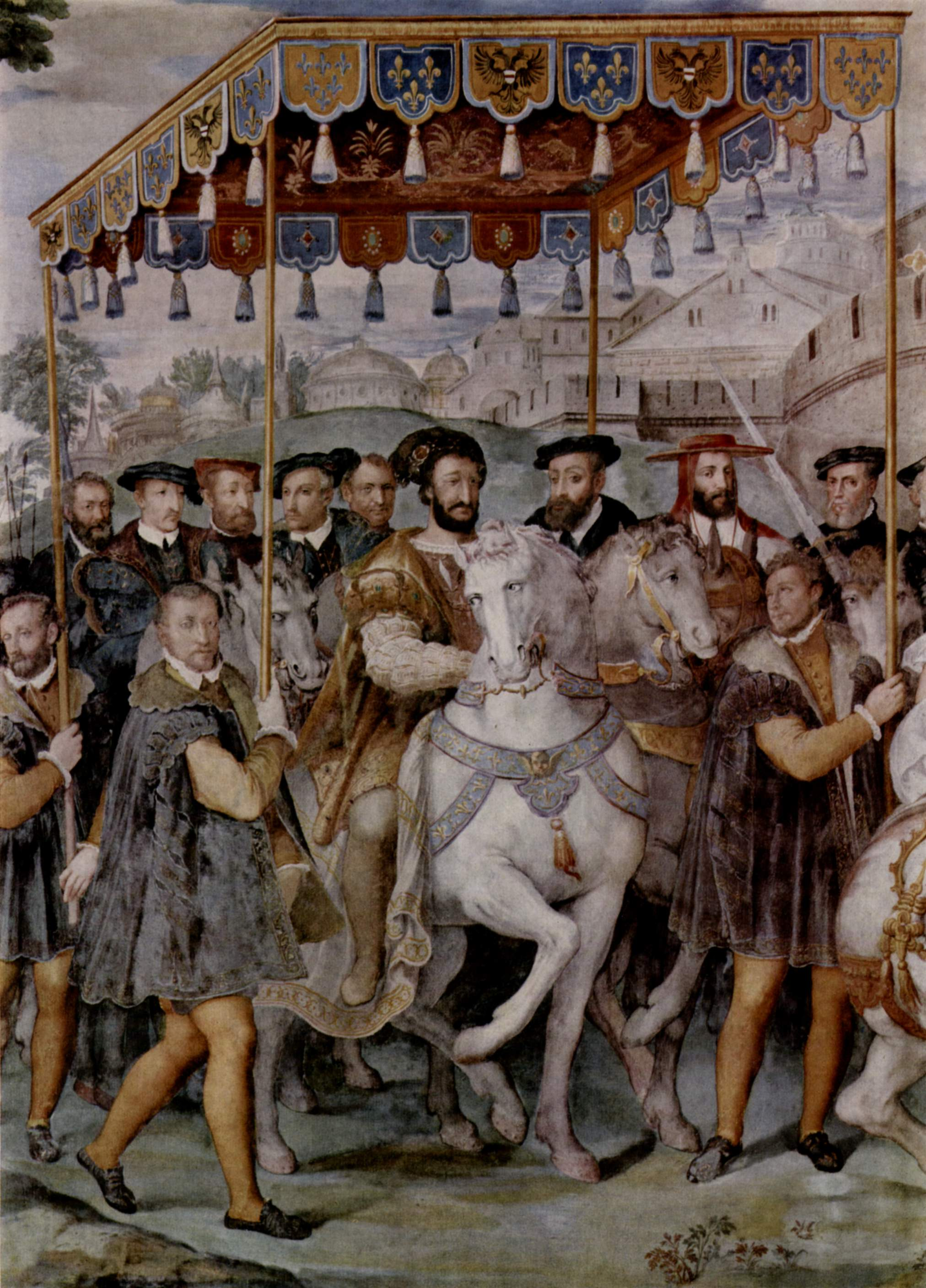
Royal Entry of Emperor Charles V, Francis I of France, and Alessandro Cardinal Farnese into Paris, Villa Farnese (1559).

Zuccaro moved to Rome by age 14, and mainly trained himself by copying earlier masters. He succeeded at an early age in gaining a knowledge of painting and in finding patrons to employ him. The principal formative influences on him were the façade decorations of Polidoro da Caravaggio. When he was seventeen a pupil of Correggio, named Daniele da Parma, engaged him to assist in painting a series of frescoes in a chapel at Vitto near Sora, on the borders of the Abruzzi (not corroborated by Freedberg). Zuccaro returned to Rome in 1548, and began his career as a fresco painter, by executing a series of scenes in monochrome from the life of Marcus Furius Camillus on the front of the palace of a wealthy Roman named Jacopo Mattei. From that time his success was assured, and he was largely employed by the popes Julius III and Paul IV, by the della Rovere duke of Urbino, and by other rich patrons. He is documented to have worked alongside Prospero Fontana in decorating the Villa Giulia. In 1556, he painted frescoed Scenes of the Passion in the "Cappella Mattei" of Santa Maria della Consolazione.

His best frescoes were a historical series in quadro riportato painted on the walls and ceiling of Villa Farnese at Caprarola, built for Cardinal Alessandro Farnese, for which Zuccaro also designed a great quantity of rich decorations in stucco relief after the style of Giulio Romano and other pupils of Raphael. He also painted Histories of Alexander in the Castello Orsini at Bracciano. Nearly all his paintings were large, rapidly executed frescos, often in chiaroscuro or monochrome.

Zuccaro borrowed elements from both the High Renaissance style and Mannerism, combining figures of natural proportion and idealized form with intense emotion. Stylistically, he also displays a Mannerist taste for sculpted physicality characteristic of Michelangelo. Vasari praised his compositional skill and the refined fluidity and vigour of his style, singling out his treatment of heads, hands and nudes.

Zuccaro's easel pictures are less common than his decorative frescoes. A small painting on copper of the Adoration of the Shepherds, formerly in the collection of James II, is now at Hampton Court Palace. The Caprarola frescoes were engraved and published by Prenner, Illustri Fatti Farnesiani Coloriti nel Real Palazzo di Caprarola (Rome, 1748–50).

Around 1558, he painted a ceiling fresco, The Martyrdom of Saint Paul, in the Frangipani Chapel in San Marcello al Corso in Rome.

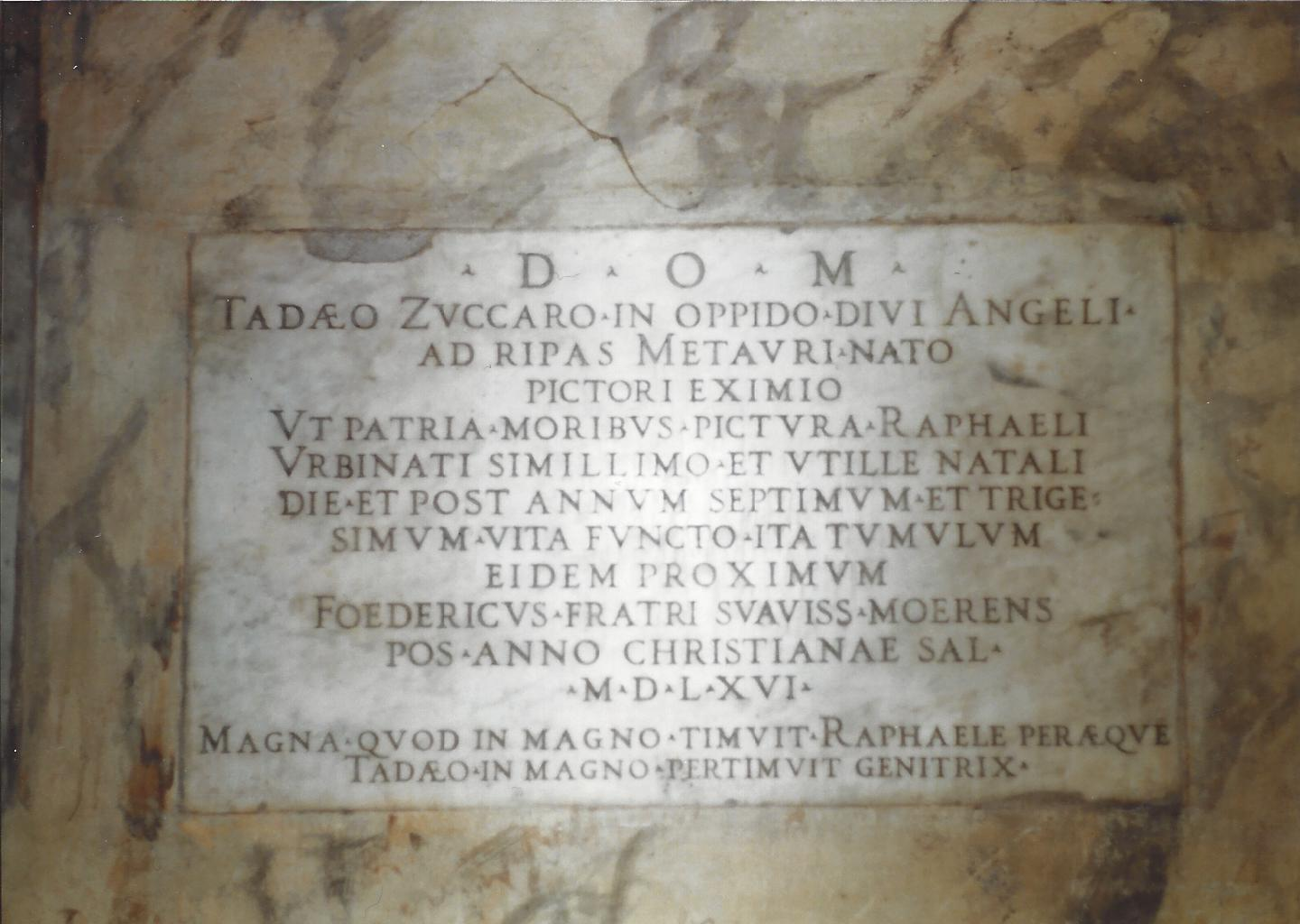
The tomb of Taddeo and Federico Zuccaro in The Pantheon in Rome, Italy

He died in Rome in 1566, and was buried in the Pantheon, not far from Raphael.
