= K-Sport Montecchio Gallo =

Italian football club

Real Montecchio
- Full name: Società Sportiva Real Montecchio
- Founded: 1965
- Ground: Stadio G. Spadoni, Sant'Angelo in Lizzola, Italy
- Capacity: 1,610
- Chairman: Maurizio Mazzoli
- League: Seconda Categoria
- 2013–14: Prima Categoria, 16th (relegated)
Home colours	Away colours

Società Sportiva Real Montecchio is an Italian association football club located in Montecchio, frazione of Sant'Angelo in Lizzola, Marche. It currently plays in Seconda Categoria. Its colors are white and red.

Real Montecchio faced a successive relegation in 2012, 2013 and 2014, which relegated it from Eccellenza Marche, Promozione, Prima Categoria to Seconda Categoria. Real Montecchio was relegated from Serie D in 2010.
