= Luca Ceriscioli =

Italian politician (born 1966)

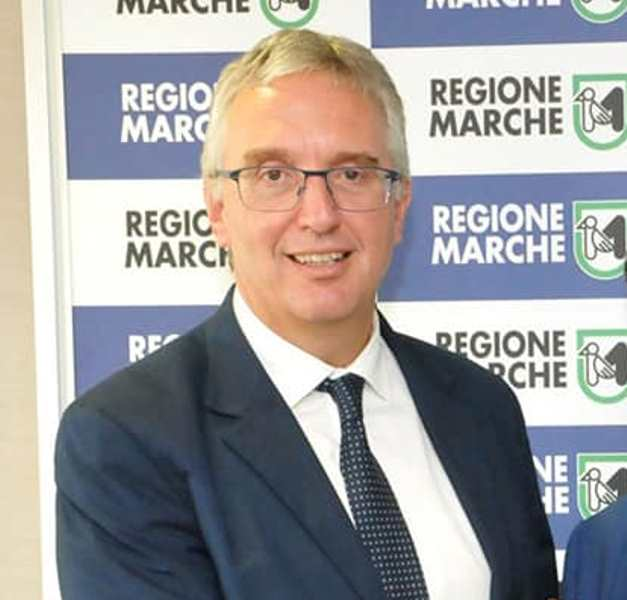

President of Marche
- In office 12 June 2015 – 30 September 2020
- Preceded by: Gian Mario Spacca
- Succeeded by: Francesco Acquaroli

Mayor of Pesaro
- In office 14 June 2004 – 30 May 2014
- Preceded by: Oriano Giovanelli
- Succeeded by: Matteo Ricci

Personal details
- Born: 15 March 1966 (age 60) Pesaro, Marche, Italy
- Party: Democratic (since 2007)
- Other political affiliations: PDS (until 1998); DS (1998–2007)
- Education: University of Bologna
- Profession: Politician, teacher

Luca Ceriscioli (born 15 March 1966 in Pesaro) is an Italian politician. He is a former mayor of Pesaro and former President of the Marche region.

== Biography ==
Graduated in mathematics from the University of Bologna, he was a Mathematics teacher at the Urbino Industrial Technical Institute.

In 1995 he was elected councilor in the IV district of the municipality of Pesaro for the Progressives list.

From 2000 to 2004 he was a municipal Assessor of Pesaro with the delegation of public works. In 2004 he was elected Mayor of Pesaro with the 56.1% of preferences; in 2009 he was re-confirmed with the 52.3% of preferences.

=== President (2015–2020) ===
In the 2015 Marche regional election Ceriscioli has been a candidate for the Partito Democratico and was elected President of the Marche region with the 41.1% of the preferences.

Political offices
Preceded by Oriano Giovanelli	Mayor of Pesaro; 2004–2014	Succeeded by Matteo Ricci
