= Alberto Alessandri =

Italian politician (born 1962)

President of the Province of Pesaro and Urbino
- Incumbent
- Assumed office 13 July 2026
- Preceded by: Giuseppe Paolini

Mayor of Cagli
- Incumbent
- Assumed office 26 May 2014
- Preceded by: Patrizio Catena

Personal details
- Born: 26 July 1962 (age 63) Cagli, Province of Pesaro and Urbino, Italy
- Occupation: Entrepreneur

Alberto Alessandri (born 26 July 1962) is an Italian politician who has served as president of the Province of Pesaro and Urbino since July 2026.

== Life and career ==
Alessandri was born in Cagli, in the province of Pesaro and Urbino, on 26 July 1962. He graduated from the "Torelli" Scientific High School in Pergola and subsequently worked in the commercial sector.

Alessandri was elected to the Cagli municipal council in 2009. He was elected mayor of Cagli in 2014 and was re-elected in 2019 and 2024. From 2014 to 2019, he also served as a member of the Provincial Council of Pesaro and Urbino.

Alessandri was elected president of the Province of Pesaro and Urbino in the provincial election held on 12 July 2026. Running as the centre-right candidate, he defeated the mayor of Urbino, Maurizio Gambini, an independent politician from the same political area, by 44,748 weighted votes (56.16%) to 34,943 (43.84%).
