= Palmiro Ucchielli =

Italian politician (born 1950)

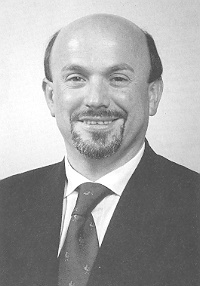

Mayor of Vallefoglia
- Incumbent
- Assumed office 26 May 2014
- Preceded by: Office established

President of the Province of Pesaro and Urbino
- In office 14 June 1999 – 8 June 2009
- Preceded by: Umberto Bernardini
- Succeeded by: Matteo Ricci

Member of the Senate of the Republic
- In office 9 May 1996 – 5 October 1999
- Constituency: Marche

Member of the Chamber of Deputies
- In office 15 April 1994 – 8 May 1996
- Constituency: Marche

Personal details
- Born: 26 January 1950 (age 76) Urbino, Italy
- Party: PCI (until 1991); PDS (1991–1998); DS (1998–2007); PD (since 2007)

Palmiro Ucchielli (born 26 January 1950) is an Italian politician who served as president of the Province of Pesaro and Urbino from 1999 to 2009, and as a member of the Chamber of Deputies and the Senate of the Republic.

In 2014 he was elected the first mayor of the newly established municipality of Vallefoglia.
