= San Gaudenzio, Vallefoglia =

Church building in Vallefoglia, Italy

Coordinates: 43°48′47″N 12°41′57″E

San Gaudenzio is a Romanesque-style, Roman Catholic pieve or parish church located in the hamlet-neighborhood of Montefabbri, now subsumed under the commune of Vallefoglia, province of Pesaro and Urbino, region of Marche, Italy.

== History ==
A church dates to the c.6th or 7th centuries, dedicated to the former bishop of Rimini, who died at the year c. 360. The first documented mentions of the church dates to 1033 and 1046.

The church dates to 1570, and the interior stucco decorations date to the 17th-century. The altar stucco depicts St Francis of Paola in prayer (1687). The church also has a putative link to the Blessed Sante da Urbino (d. 1394 - 1394), known al secolo as Giansante Brancorsini, who was born in the parish. The crypt, dating to the 12th-century, houses the putative relics of the fourth-century Saint Marcellina; these were moved here in 1666, although she appears to no have had links to the town in life. The 15th century belltower rises to the left of the apse.

== Gallery ==
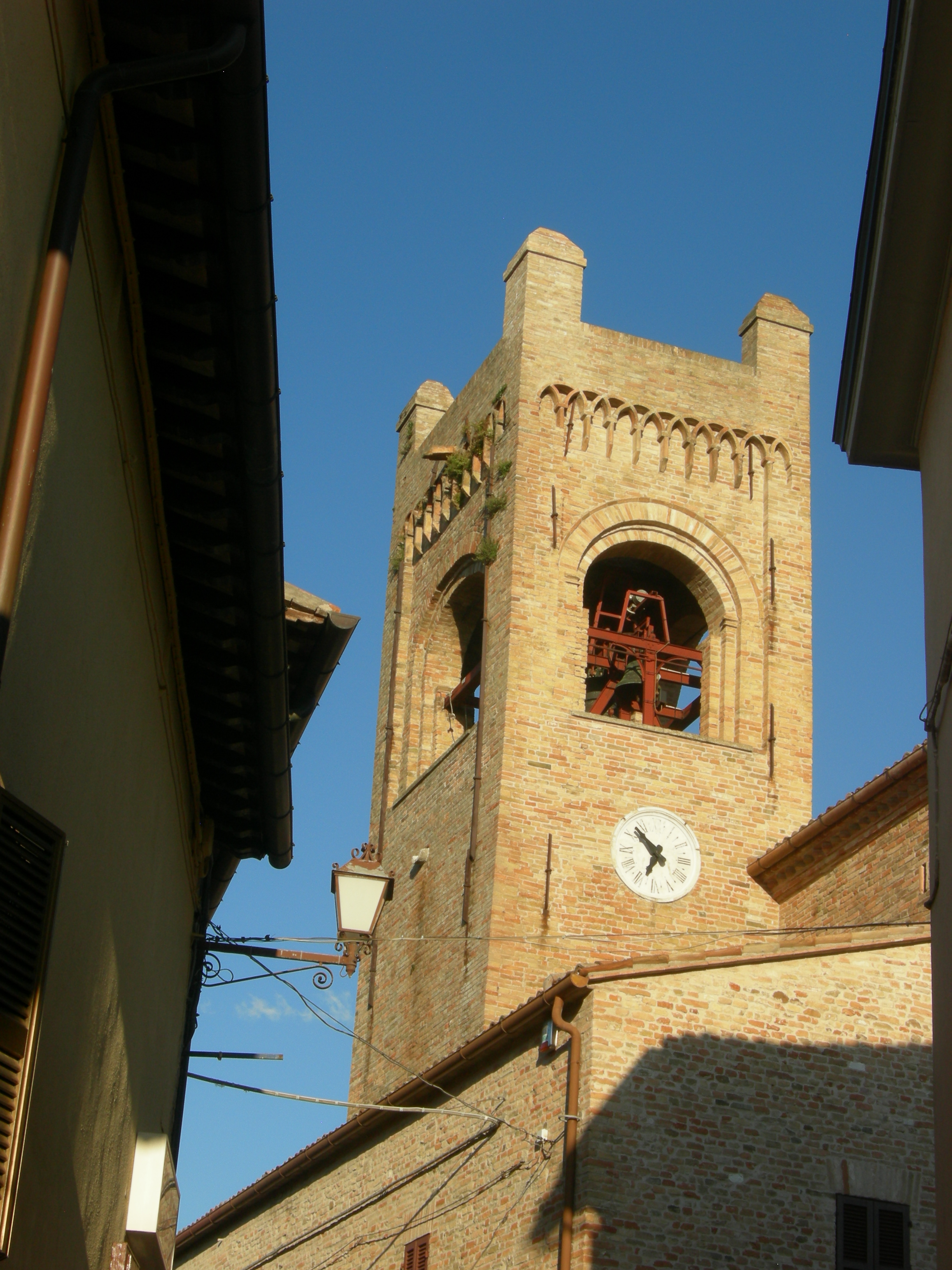
The church's outside

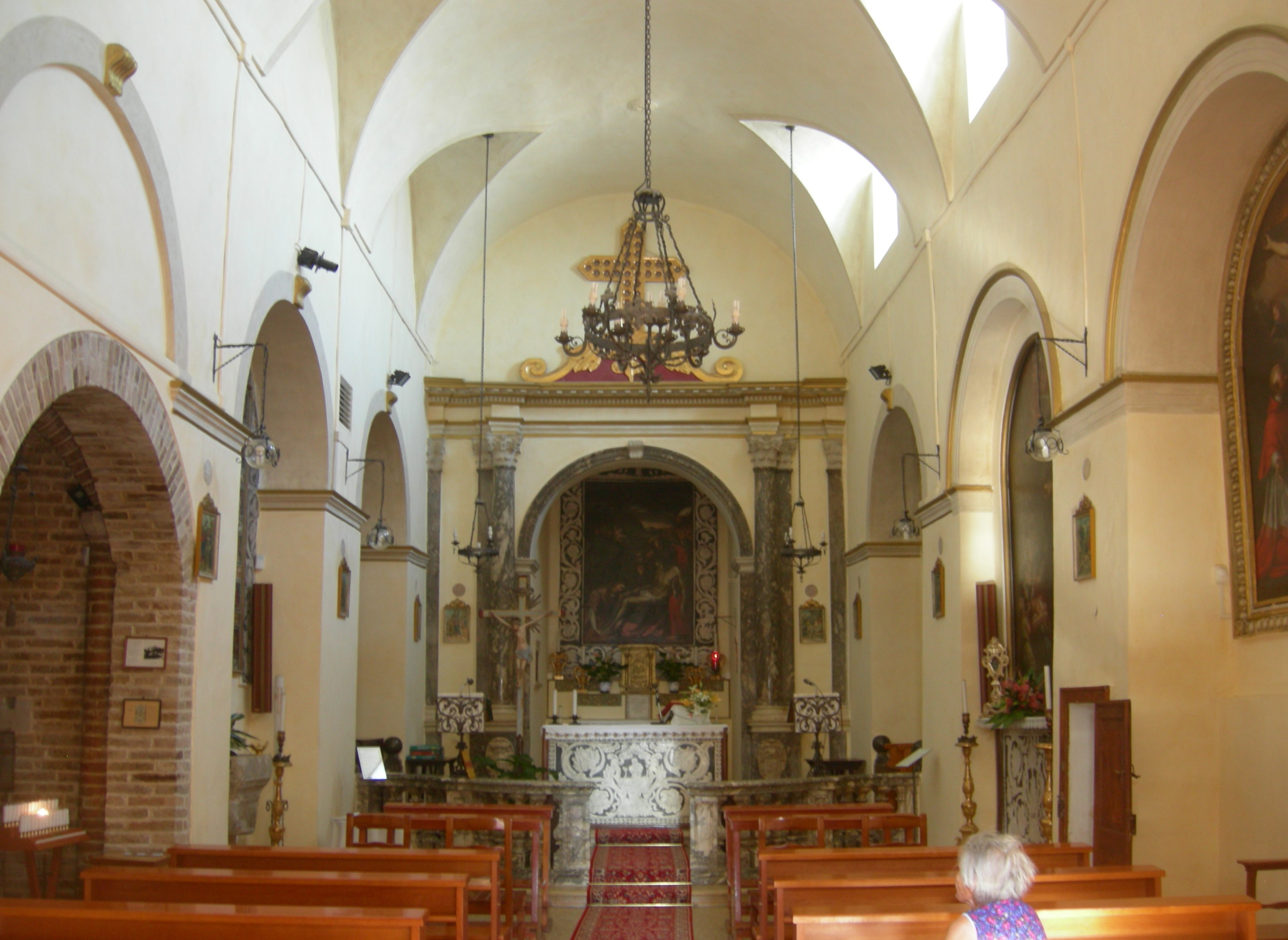
The church's inside
