= Vito Rosaspina =

Italian politician (1932–2018)

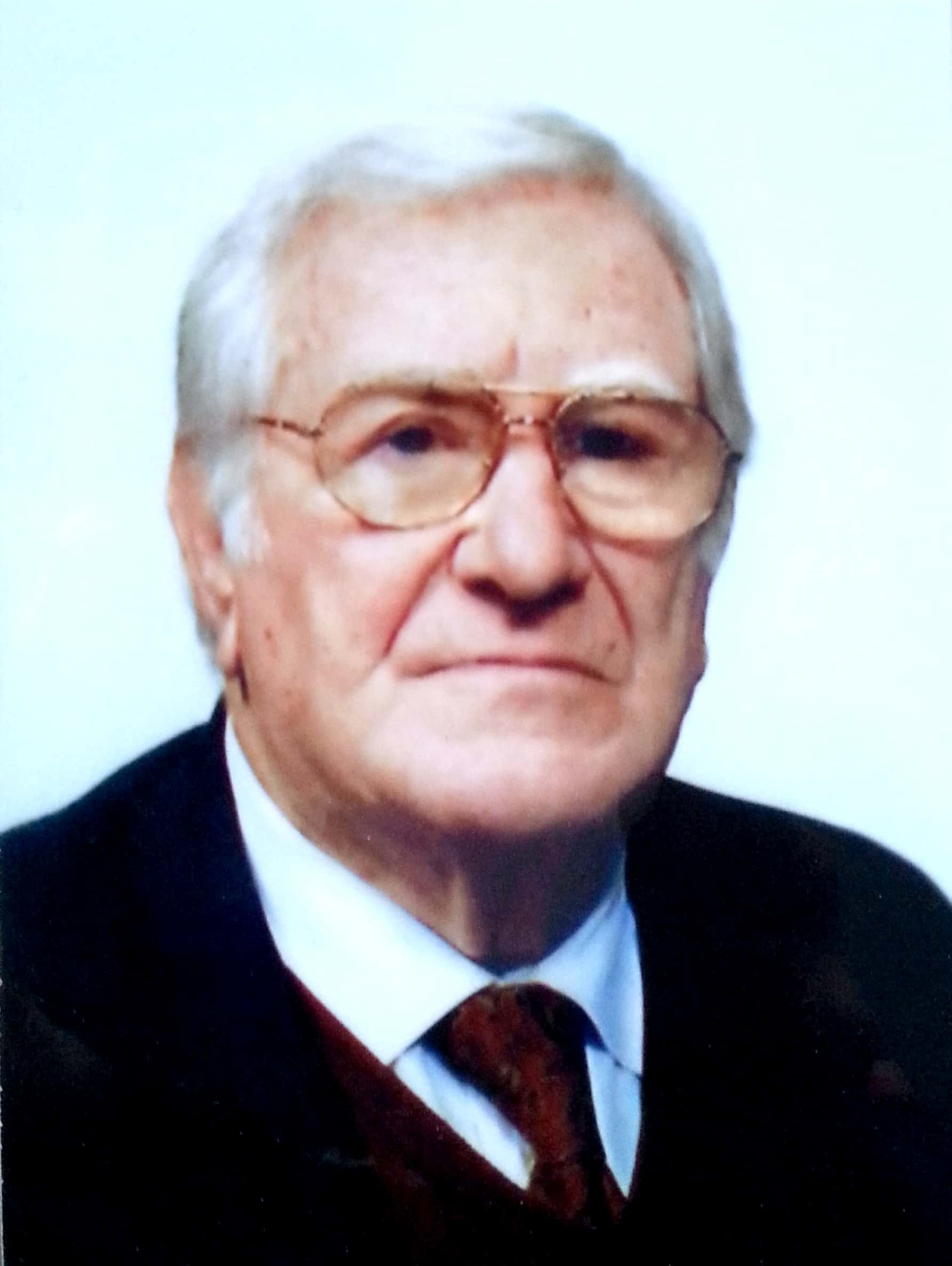

President of the Province of Pesaro and Urbino
- In office 1980 – 5 March 1993
- Preceded by: Salvatore Vergari
- Succeeded by: Umberto Bernardini

Regional assessor for Budget and Finance of Marche
- In office 20 December 1972 – 10 September 1975
- President: Dino Tiberi

Member of the Regional Council of Marche
- In office 7 June 1970 – June 1975

Personal details
- Born: 13 March 1923 Piandimeleto, Province of Pesaro and Urbino, Kingdom of Italy
- Died: 3 August 2018 (aged 95) Pesaro, Italy
- Party: Italian Socialist Party
- Profession: Veterinarian

Vito Rosaspina (13 March 1923 – 3 August 2018) was an Italian politician who served as president of the Province of Pesaro and Urbino from 1980 to 1993 and as a member of the Regional Council of Marche.
