= Giorgio De Sabbata =

Italian politician (1925–2013)

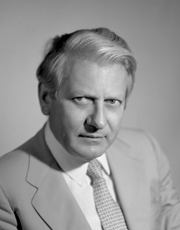
- De Sabbata in 1982

Mayor of Pesaro
- In office 1959–1970
- Preceded by: Renato Fastigi
- Succeeded by: Marcello Stefanini

Member of the Chamber of Deputies
- In office 1972–1976

Member of the Senate of the Republic
- In office 1976–1987

Personal details
- Born: 2 July 1925
- Died: 27 July 2013 (aged 88)
- Political party: Partito Comunista Italiano (until 1991); Partito Democratico della Sinistra (since 1991)

Giorgio De Sabbata (2 July 1925 – 27 July 2013) was an Italian politician who served as Mayor of Pesaro (1959–1970), Deputy (1972–1976), and Senator (1976–1987).
