= San Michele Arcangelo in Sant'Angelo in Lizzola =

Roman Catholic Church in Italy

Coordinates: 43°49′38″N 12°48′10″E

San Michele Arcangelo is a Roman Catholic parish church located on Via Morselli#2 in the hamlet of Sant'Angelo in Lizzola, a neighborhood of Vallefoglia in the province of Pesaro e Urbino, region of Marche, Italy.

== History ==
A church in this town was present in early medieval towns. The church of San Michele, a dedication favored by the Lombards, replaced an earlier parish church dedicated to San Andrea. The first documentation of the church dates to 1290-1292. Documents recall a papal visit in 1574. The present church structure was erected in 1705; and in 1718 the pope Clement XI elevated the church to a Collegiate church.

The church houses a notable wooden choir stalls, and a marble baptismal font dating to 18th century. There are also some 17th-century reproductions of works by Guido Reni, Correggio and Federigo Barocci.
