= Umberto Bernardini =

Italian politician (1942–2013)

President of the Province of Pesaro and Urbino
- In office 30 March 1993 – 14 June 1999
- Preceded by: Vito Rosaspina
- Succeeded by: Palmiro Ucchielli

Member of the Regional Council of Marche
- In office 31 July 1985 – 21 March 1990

Mayor of Monte Grimano Terme
- In office 14 June 2004 – 8 June 2009
- Preceded by: Gilberto Ottaviani
- Succeeded by: Daniele D'Antonio

Personal details
- Born: 27 July 1942 Urbino, Kingdom of Italy
- Died: 4 October 2013 (aged 71) Urbino, Italy
- Party: PCI (until 1991); PDS (1991–1998); DS (1998–2013)
- Education: University of Urbino
- Profession: Philosopher, university professor

Umberto Bernardini (27 July 1942 – 4 October 2013) was an Italian philosopher and politician who served as president of the Province of Pesaro and Urbino, mayor of Monte Grimano Terme, and member of the Regional Council of Marche.

A professor of moral philosophy at the University of Urbino, Bernardini began his political activity in the Italian Communist Party and later joined the Democratic Party of the Left.
