= San Biagio, Saludecio =

Roman Catholic church in Rimini province, Italy

Coordinates: 43°52′22.0″N 12°40′06.4″E

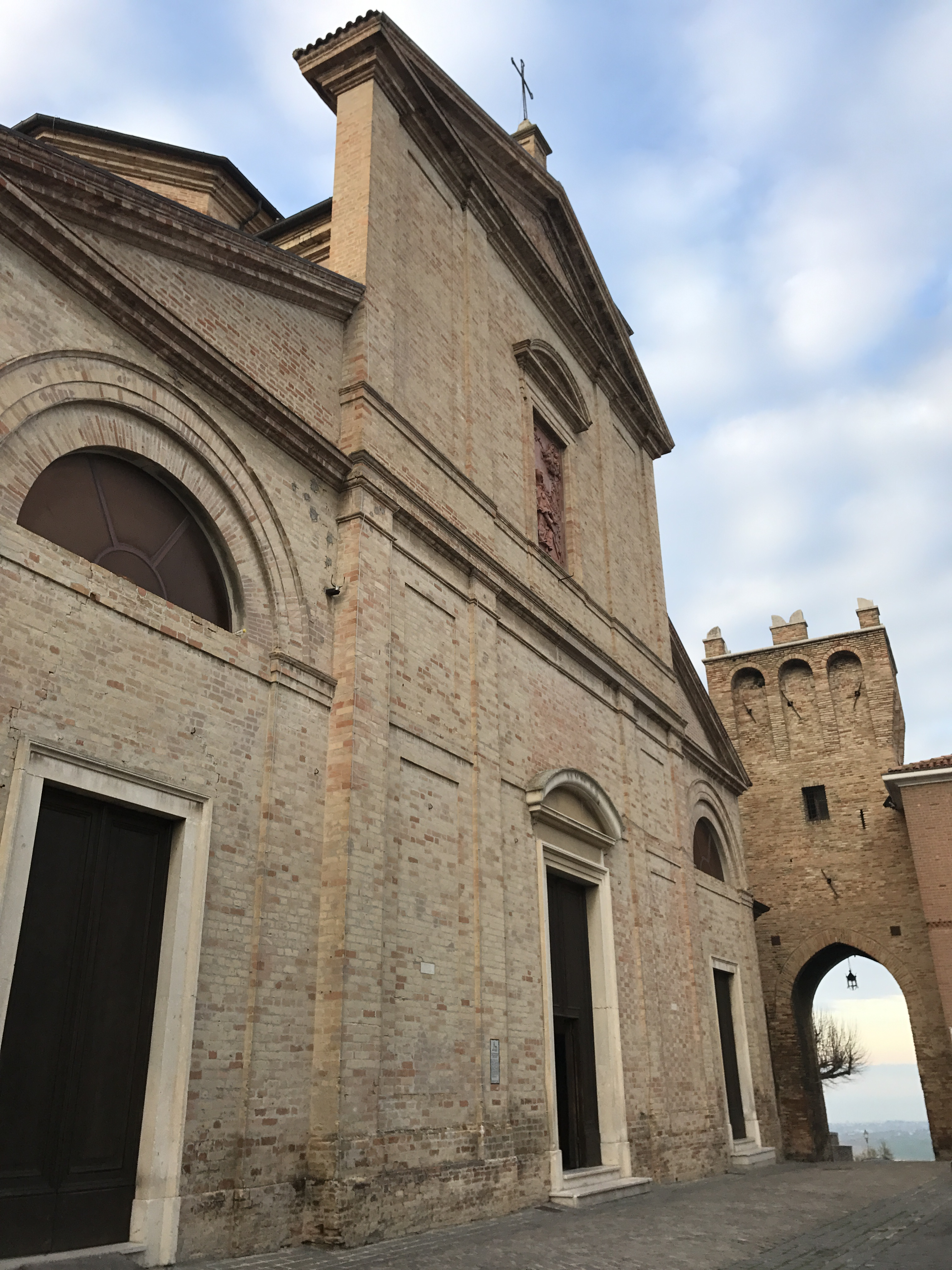

San Biagio is a Neoclassical Roman Catholic parish church in Saludecio, province of Rimini, region of Emilia-Romagna, Italy.

A new church was designed by the architect Giuseppe Achilli, and reconstruction occurred in 1804. The layout is in the shape of a Greek Cross. The interior heavily decorated with stucco, has works by Antonio Trentanove, Guido Cagnacci, Claudio Ridolfi, and il Centino. Since 1930, the church now houses the incorruptible body of Saint Amato Ronconi (born 1225); he was declared blessed by Pope Pius VI in 1776. He was recently canonized by Pope Francis in 2014.
