= List of presidents of the Province of Pesaro and Urbino =

President of the Province of Pesaro and Urbino
- Presidente della Provincia di Pesaro e Urbino
- Incumbent; Alberto Alessandri since 13 July 2026
- Term length: 4 years
- Inaugural holder: Augusto Guidi
- Formation: 1889

The president of the Province of Pesaro and Urbino is the head of the provincial government in Pesaro and Urbino, Marche, Italy. The president oversees the administration of the province, coordinates the activities of the municipalities, and represents the province in regional and national matters.

Since July 2026, the office has been held by Alberto Alessandri, a centre-right independent.

== List ==
=== Presidents of the Provincial Deputation (1889–1926) ===
| No. | Portrait | Name | Term start | Term end | Party |
|---|---|---|---|---|---|
| 1 | | Augusto Guidi | 1889 | 1891 | |
| 2 | | Ostilio Martori Savini | 1891 | 1893 | |
| 3 | | Faustolo Masini Pallazzi | 1893 | 1899 | |
| 4 | | Alessandro Rossi | 1899 | 1914 | |
| 5 | | Pietro Fonti | 1914 | ? | |

=== Presidents of the Province (1951–present) ===
| No. | Portrait | Name | Term start | Term end | Party |
|---|---|---|---|---|---|
| | | ? | ? | ? | ? |
| | | Salvatore Vergari | 1970 | 1980 | Italian Socialist Party |
| | | Vito Rosaspina | 1980 | 5 March 1993 | Italian Socialist Party |
| | | Umberto Bernardini | 30 March 1993 | 24 April 1995 | Democratic Party of the Left |
| | | Umberto Bernardini | 24 April 1995 | 14 June 1999 | Democratic Party of the Left |
| | | Palmiro Ucchielli | 14 June 1999 | 14 June 2004 | Democrats of the Left; Democratic Party |
| | | Palmiro Ucchielli | 14 June 2004 | 8 June 2009 | Democrats of the Left; Democratic Party |
| | | Matteo Ricci | 8 June 2009 | 23 June 2014 | Democratic Party |
| – | | Massimo Galuzzi (acting) | 23 June 2014 | 13 October 2014 | Democratic Party |
| | | Daniele Tagliolini | 13 October 2014 | 31 October 2018 | Democratic Party |
| | | Giuseppe Paolini | 31 October 2018 | 19 December 2022 | Democratic Party |
| | | Giuseppe Paolini | 19 December 2022 | 25 May 2026 | Democratic Party |
| – | | Laura Giombini (acting) | 25 May 2026 | 13 July 2026 | Democratic Party |
| | | Alberto Alessandri | 13 July 2026 | Incumbent | Independent (centre-right) |

== Sources ==
- "Storia amministrativa dell'ente". Ministero dell'Interno.
- Menichini, Piera (2005). "I presidenti delle Province dall'Unità alla Grande guerra: repertorio analitico". Storia Amministrazione Costituzione (13): 275–276.
