= Daniele Tagliolini =

Italian politician (1977–2022)

President of the Province of Pesaro and Urbino
- In office 13 October 2014 – 31 October 2018
- Preceded by: Matteo Ricci
- Succeeded by: Giuseppe Paolini

Mayor of Peglio
- In office 14 June 2004 – 27 May 2019
- Preceded by: Lidia Amatori Martelli
- Succeeded by: Cristina Belpassi

Personal details
- Born: 22 October 1977 Sassocorvaro, Province of Pesaro and Urbino, Italy
- Died: 9 March 2022 (aged 44) Rimini, Italy
- Party: DS; PD

Daniele Tagliolini (22 October 1977 – 9 March 2022) was an Italian politician who served as president of the Province of Pesaro and Urbino from 2014 to 2018.

== Life and career ==
Tagliolini was born in Sassocorvaro and lived in Peglio, where he was elected mayor for the first time with the Democrats of the Left in 2004. As mayor, he promoted policies related to renewable energy, environmental sustainability and European territorial projects. He was re-elected in 2009 and in 2014.

From 2009 to 2014 he was a member of the Provincial Council of Pesaro and Urbino, serving as group leader of the Democratic Party. In October 2014 he was elected president of the Province of Pesaro and Urbino. During his presidency, Tagliolini focused on school infrastructure, roads and the reorganization of provincial administration after the reform of Italian provinces.

In November 2020, he was appointed president of Marche Multiservizi by mayor Matteo Ricci.

He died suddenly on 9 March 2022 at the age of 44.
