= List of mayors of Pesaro =

Mayor of Pesaro
- Sindaco di Pesaro
- Incumbent; Andrea Biancani (PD) since 13 June 2024
- Appointer: Popular election
- Term length: 5 years, renewable once
- Formation: 1861
- Website: Official website

The mayor of Pesaro is an elected politician who, along with the Pesaro's city council, is accountable for the strategic government of Pesaro in Marche, Italy.

The current mayor is Andrea Biancani (PD), who took office on 13 June 2024.

== Overview ==
According to the Italian Constitution, the mayor of Pesaro is member of the city council.

The mayor is elected by the population of Pesaro, who also elect the members of the city council, controlling the mayor's policy guidelines and is able to enforce his resignation by a motion of no confidence. The mayor is entitled to appoint and release the members of his government.

Since 1995 the mayor is elected directly by Pesaro's electorate: in all mayoral elections in Italy in cities with a population higher than 15,000 the voters express a direct choice for the mayor or an indirect choice voting for the party of the candidate's coalition. If no candidate receives at least 50% of votes, the top two candidates go to a second round after two weeks. The election of the City Council is based on a direct choice for the candidate with a preference vote: the candidate with the majority of the preferences is elected. The number of the seats for each party is determined proportionally.

== Republic of Italy (since 1946) ==
=== City Council election (1946-1995) ===
From 1946 to 1995, the Mayor of Pesaro was elected by the City Council.

	Mayor	Term start	Term end	Party
1	Renato Fastigi (1904–1997)	1946	1959	PCI
2	Giorgio De Sabbata (1925–2013)	1959	1970	PCI
3	Marcello Stefanini (1938–1994)	1970	1978	PCI
4	Giorgio Tornati (b. 1937)	1978	1987	PCI
5	Aldo Amati (b. 1944)	1987	1992	PCI
6	Oriano Giovanelli (b. 1957)	1992	1995	PDS

=== Direct election (since 1995) ===
Since 1995, under provisions of new local administration law, the Mayor of Pesaro is chosen by direct election, originally every four, then every five years.

	Mayor	Term start	Term end	Party	Coalition	Election
(6)	Oriano Giovanelli (b. 1957)	8 May 1995	14 June 1999	PDS; DS	The Olive Tree (PDS-PdD)	1995
(6)	Oriano Giovanelli (b. 1957)	14 June 1999	14 June 2004	PDS; DS	The Olive Tree (DS-PPI-SDI-PRC)	1999
7	Luca Ceriscioli (b. 1966)	14 June 2004	10 June 2009	DS; PD	The Olive Tree (DS-DL-PRC-PdCI)	2004
7	Luca Ceriscioli (b. 1966)	10 June 2009	30 May 2014	DS; PD	PD • IdV • PRC	2009
8	Matteo Ricci (b. 1974)	30 May 2014	30 May 2019	PD	PD and leftist lists	2014
8	Matteo Ricci (b. 1974)	30 May 2019	13 June 2024	PD	PD and leftist lists	2019
9	Andrea Biancani (b. 1971)	13 June 2024	incumbent	PD	PD • M5S • AVS	2024
