= Marcello Stefanini =

Italian politician (1938–1994)

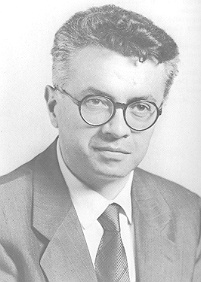
Marcello Stefanini

Marcello Stefanini (11 January 1938 – 29 December 1994) was an Italian politician who served as Mayor of Pesaro (1970–1978), Deputy (1987–1992), and Senator (1992–1994).
