= President of Marche =

- Seal of Marche

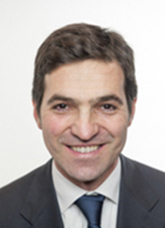
- Incumbent; Francesco Acquaroli since 30 September 2020
- Term length: Five years, no term limits
- Inaugural holder: Giuseppe Serrini (1970)
- Formation: Italian Constitution
- Website: Region of Marche

The president of Marche is the supreme authority of Marche. It was originally appointed by the Regional Council of Marche. The incumbent is Francesco Acquaroli who is serving a second term.

== Election ==
Originally appointed by the Regional Council of Marche, since 1995 de facto and 2000 de jure, he is elected by popular vote every five years under universal suffrage: the candidate who receives a plurality of votes, is elected.

His office is connected to the Regional Council, which is elected contextually: a majority bonus hugely increases the number of his supporters in the assembly. The council and the president are linked by an alleged relationship of confidence: if the president resigns or he is dismissed by the council, a snap election is called for both the legislative and the executive offices, because in no case the two bodies can be chosen separately.

The popular election of the president and the relationship of confidence between him and the legislature, allow to identify the Lombard model of government as a particular form of semi-presidential system.

== Powers ==
The president of Marche promulgates regional laws and regulations. He can receive special administrative functions by the national government. The president is one of the eighty members of the Regional Council and, in this capacity, he can propose new laws.

The president appoints and dismiss the Regional Cabinet (called Giunta Regionale in Italian). The Cabinet is composed by no more than sixteen regional assessors (assessori, literally "aldermen" (Note: According to Google Translate)) who can be members of the Council at the same time. Assessors should not be confused with the ministers: according to Italian administrative law, assessors only receive delegations from the president to rule a bureau or an agency, the Region being a single legal person, not divided in ministries. One assessor can be appointed vice president. The president can also appoint four under-secretaries (sottosegretari) to help the president in his functions.

The Regional Cabinet prepares the budget, appoints the boards of public regional agencies and companies, manages assets, develops projects of governance, and resorts to the Constitutional Court of Italy if it thinks that a national law may violate regional powers. The president and the Cabinet are two different authorities of the Region: in matters within its competence, the Cabinet has the power to vote to give its approval.

== Officeholders ==
Presidents elected by the Regional Council
Officeholder	Party	Tenure	
Officeholder	Party	From	To
Giuseppe Serrini (1917-1994)	Christian Democracy	1 August 1970	19 December 1972
Dino Tiberi (1923-2013)	Christian Democracy	19 December 1972	10 September 1975
Adriano Ciaffi (1936)	Christian Democracy	10 September 1975	7 September 1978
Emidio Massi (1922-2016)	Italian Socialist Party	7 September 1978	18 November 1980
Emidio Massi (1922-2016)	Italian Socialist Party	19 November 1980	21 October 1985
Emidio Massi (1922-2016)	Italian Socialist Party	21 October 1985	22 July 1990
Rodolfo Giampaoli (1939)	Christian Democracy (Italy)	22 July 1990	19 July 1993
Gaetano Recchi (1934)	Italian Socialist Party	19 July 1993	19 June 1995
Presidents elected by direct election
Vito D'Ambrosio (1943)	Democratic Party of the Left	19 June 1995	15 May 2000
Vito D'Ambrosio (1943)	Democrats of the Left	15 May 2000	18 April 2005
Gian Mario Spacca (1953)	La Margherita	18 April 2005	8 April 2010
Gian Mario Spacca (1953)	Democratic Party	8 April 2010	12 June 2015
Luca Ceriscioli (1966)	Democratic Party	12 June 2015	30 September 2020
Francesco Acquaroli (1974)	Brothers of Italy	30 September 2020	29 September 2025
Francesco Acquaroli (1974)	Brothers of Italy	30 September 2025	incumbent

== See also ==
- Politics of Marche
- Legislative Assembly of Marche
