= Colbordolo =

- Comune
- Comune di Colbordolo
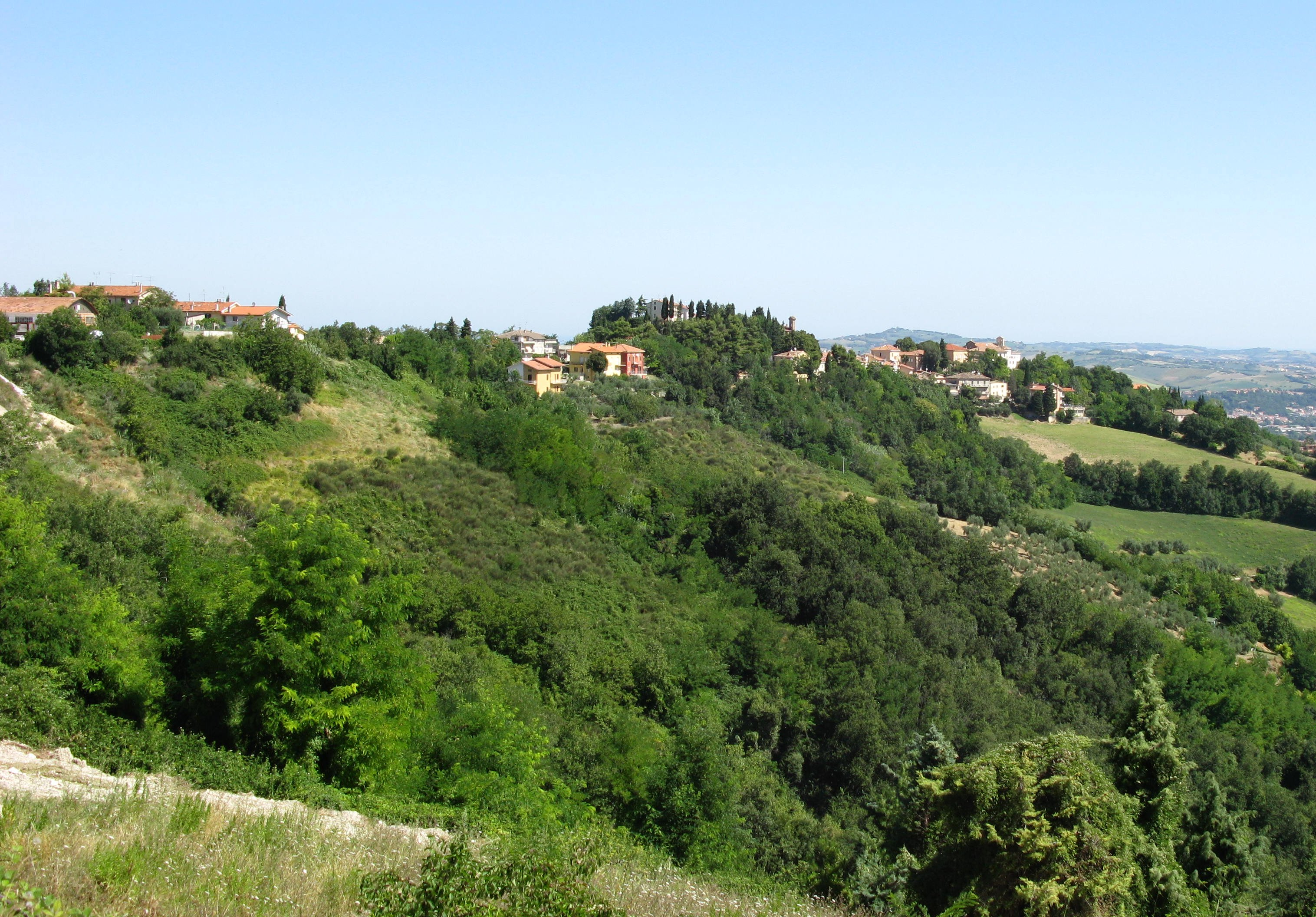
- View of Colbordolo

- Location within Italy Location within Marche
- Coordinates: 43°49′N 12°43′E
- Country: Italy
- Region: Marche
- Province: Pesaro e Urbino (PU)

Area
  - Total: 27.84 km^{2} (10.75 sq mi)
- Elevation: 293 m (961 ft)

Population (31 December 2010)
  - Total: 6,236
  - Density: 224.0/km^{2} (580.1/sq mi)
- Demonym: Colbordolesi
- Time zone: UTC+1 (CET)
  - Summer (DST): UTC+2 (CEST)
- Postal code: 61022
- Dialing code: 0721
- Patron saint: St. John the Baptist
- Saint day: 24 June
- united to Sant'Angelo in Lizzola 1 january 2014

Colbordolo is a frazione of the comune of Vallefoglia in the Province of Pesaro e Urbino in the Italian region Marche. It was a separate comune until 2013.
