= Vallefoglia =

- Comune
- Comune di Vallefoglia
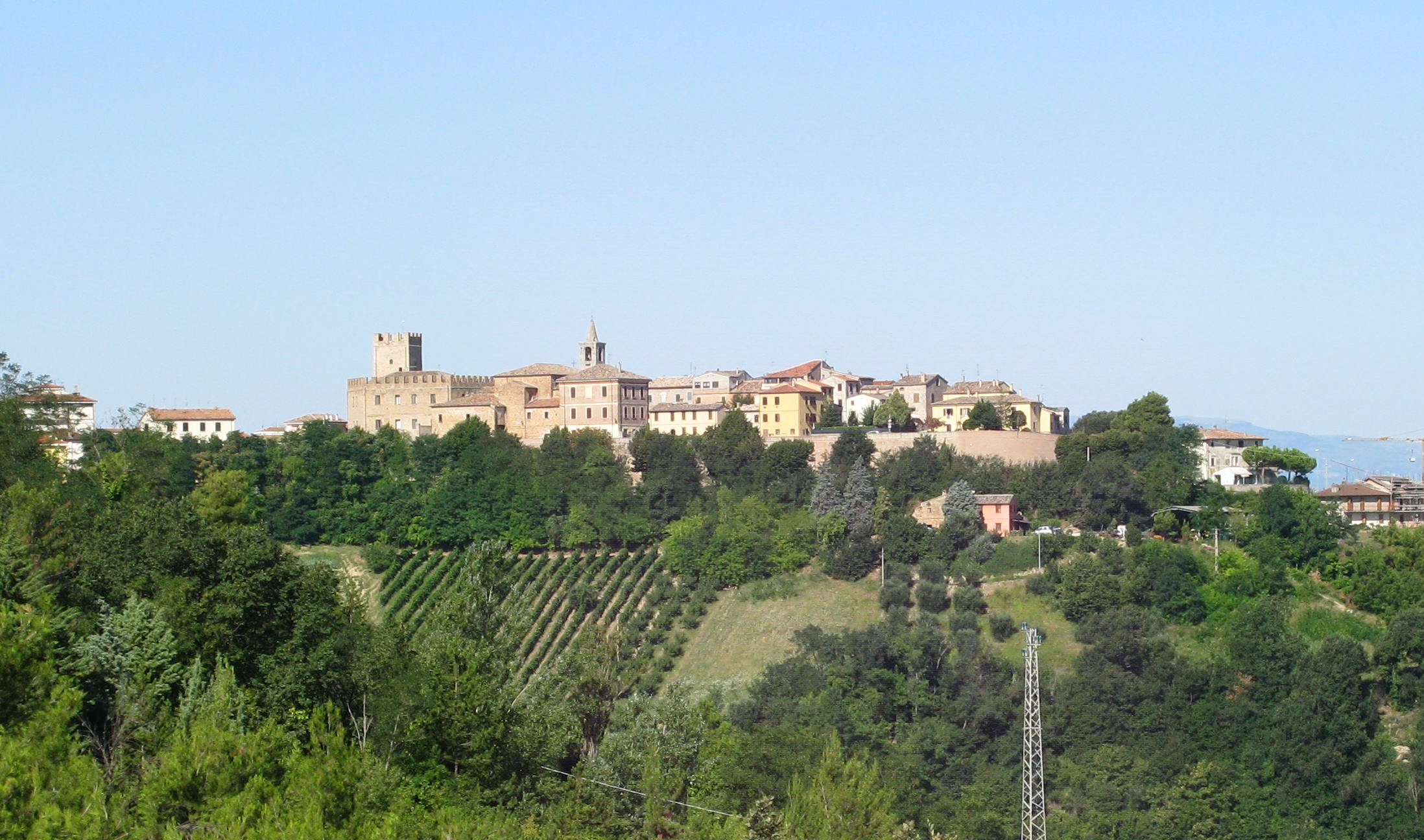
- View of Sant'Angelo in Lizzola, the municipal seat.

- Location within Italy Location within Marche
- Coordinates: 43°49′40″N 12°48′06″E
- Country: Italy
- Region: Marche
- Province: Province of Pesaro and Urbino (PU)
- Frazioni: Colbordolo, Montecchio, Montefabbri, Morciola, Sant'Angelo in Lizzola (town hall), Talacchio

Government
  - Mayor: Palmiro Ucchielli

Area
  - Total: 39.3 km^{2} (15.2 sq mi)
- Elevation ISTAT: 280 m (920 ft)

Population (30 June 2017)ISTAT
  - Total: 14,876
  - Density: 379/km^{2} (980/sq mi)
- Time zone: UTC+1 (CET)
  - Summer (DST): UTC+2 (CEST)
- Postal code: 61022
- Dialing code: 0721
- Website: http://www.comune.vallefoglia.pu.it/

Vallefoglia is a comune in the province of Pesaro and Urbino, in the Italian region Marche, created in 2014 from the merger of the communes of Colbordolo and Sant'Angelo in Lizzola, after 76,3% of the population approved the unification in a referendum.

The 16th-century parish church of the hamlet of Montefabbri is titled San Gaudenzio. The name comes from Italian valle ("valley") + Foglia (the name of the river), thus ("Foglia valley"). Its frazione of Montefabbri is one of I Borghi più belli d'Italia ("The most beautiful villages of Italy").
