= Sant'Angelo in Lizzola =

- Frazione
- Former Comune di Sant'Angelo in Lizzola
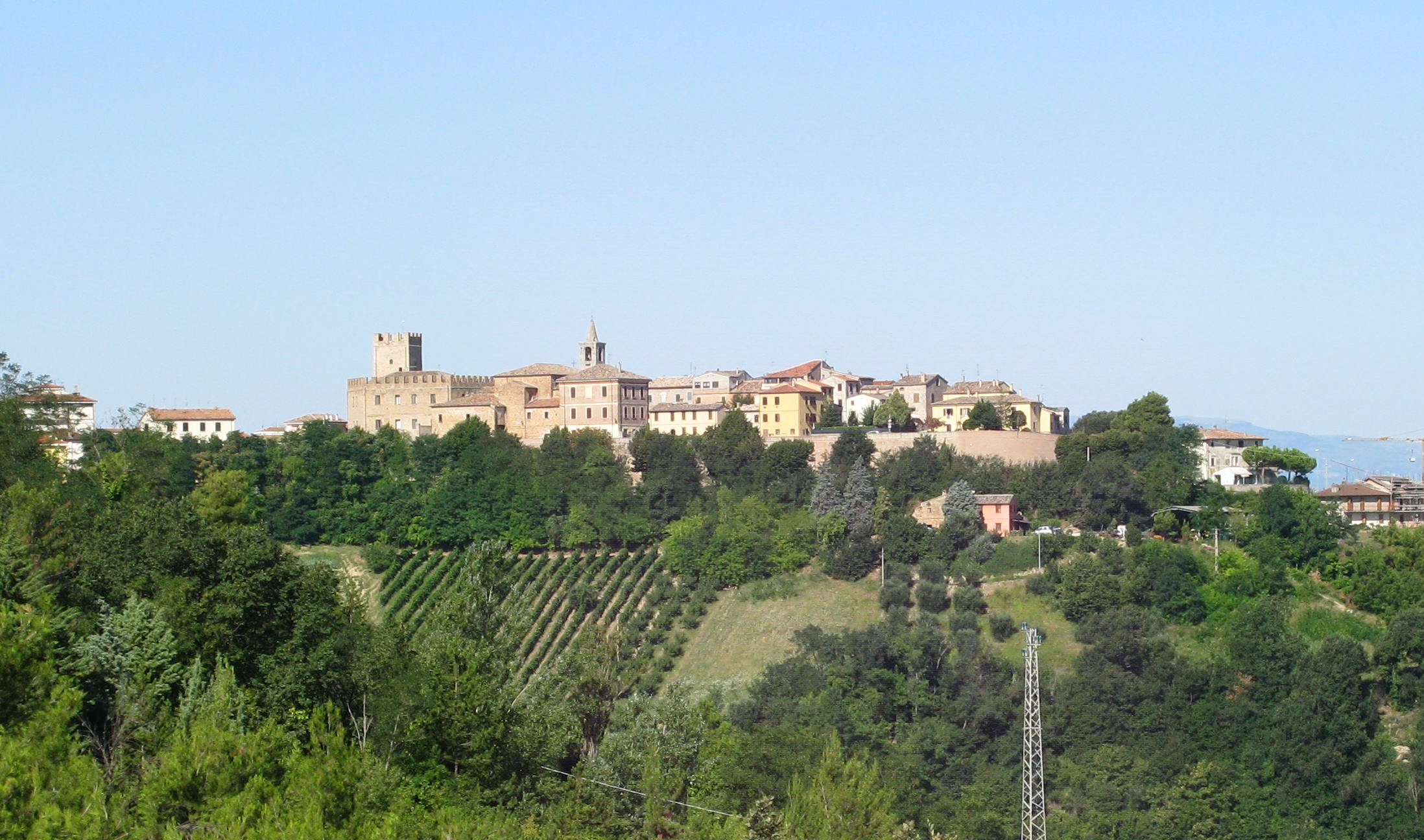
- View of Sant'Angelo in Lizzola

- Location of Sant'Angelo in Lizzola in Italy
- Coordinates: 43°50′N 12°48′E
- Country: Italy
- Region: Marche
- Province: Pesaro e Urbino (PU)
- Comune: Vallefoglia

Area
  - Total: 11.8 km^{2} (4.6 sq mi)

Population (31 December 2010)
  - Total: 8,749
  - Density: 741/km^{2} (1,920/sq mi)
- Demonym: Santangiolesi
- Time zone: UTC+1 (CET)
  - Summer (DST): UTC+2 (CEST)
- Postal code: 61020
- Dialing code: 0721
- Patron saint: St. Michael Archangel
- Saint day: May 8
- united to Colbordolo 1 january 2014

Sant'Angelo in Lizzola is a frazione of the comune of Vallefoglia in the province of Pesaro e Urbino in the Italian region Marche. It was a separate comune until 2013.

The main parish church is the former collegiate church of San Michele Arcangelo.
