= Deaths in April 2018 =

The following is a list of notable deaths in April 2018.

Entries for each day are listed alphabetically by surname. A typical entry lists information in the following sequence:

- Name, age, country of citizenship at birth, subsequent country of citizenship (if applicable), reason for notability, cause of death (if known), and reference.

== April 2018 ==
=== 1 ===
- Amsale Aberra, 64, Ethiopian-born American fashion designer, uterine cancer.
- Françoise Adret, 97, French ballerina and choreographer.
- Bob Beattie, 85, American skiing coach (national team) and sports commentator (ABC Sports, ESPN).
- Steven Bochco, 74, American television producer and writer (Hill Street Blues, L.A. Law, NYPD Blue), 10-time Emmy winner, leukemia.
- Gil Brealey, 85, Australian film director and producer (Sunday Too Far Away, Annie's Coming Out).
- Ricardo Pedro Chaves Pinto Filho, 79, Brazilian Roman Catholic prelate, Bishop of Leopoldina (1990–1996) and Archbishop of Pouso Alegre (1996–2014).
- Foster Diebold, 85, American academic, President of the University of Alaska system (1977–1979) and Edinboro University of Pennsylvania (1979–1996).
- Edward Digby, 12th Baron Digby, 93, British peer and Army officer.
- Gabriel Dover, 80, British geneticist, chest infection.
- Robert F. Gatje, 90, American architect, stroke.
- Kazimierz Gierżod, 81, Polish pianist.
- Michiko Hirayama, 94, Japanese singer.
- Almerindo Jaka Jamba, 69, Angolan politician and rebel leader (UNITA), stroke.
- Etelka Keserű, 92, Hungarian politician, Minister of Light Industry (1971–1980).
- Audrey Morris, 89, American jazz singer and pianist.
- Brian Moynahan, 77, British journalist and historian.
- Vladimir Nakoryakov, 82, Russian physicist, absorptive heat pump theorist.
- Jocelyn Newman, 80, Australian politician, Senator for Tasmania (1986–2002), Minister for Social Security (1996–1998) and Family and Community Services (1998–2001), Alzheimer's disease.
- Aimo Nieminen, 77, Finnish Olympic weightlifter.
- John Pretlove, 85, English cricketer (Kent).
- C. V. Rajendran, 81, Indian film director.
- Wilfrid Rall, 95, American neuroscientist.
- Efraín Ríos Montt, 91, Guatemalan military officer and politician, President (1982–1983), heart attack.
- Avichai Rontzki, 66, Israeli general, Chief Military Rabbi of the Israel Defence Forces (2006–2010), colorectal cancer.
- Michel Sénéchal, 91, French tenor.
- Ruth Sonntag Nussenzweig, 89, Austrian-Brazilian immunologist.
- Scott Sowers, 54, American actor (Cracker, Erin Brockovich, Money Train), heart attack.
- Efraín Trelles, 64, Peruvian historian of Spanish colonialism and sports commentator, heart attack.
- Julia Vargas-Weise, 76, Bolivian photographer, screenwriter, and film director (Sealed Cargo).

=== 2 ===
- Susan Anspach, 75, American actress (Five Easy Pieces, Play It Again, Sam, Blume in Love), heart failure.
- Clyde Billington Jr., 83, American politician, member of the Connecticut House of Representatives (1971–1979).
- P. L. Thibaut Brian, 87, American chemical engineer.
- Wes Buller, 89, American football coach.
- Alton Ford, 36, American basketball player (Phoenix Suns, Houston Rockets), lymphoma.
- Anthony Freeman, 29, American Roman Catholic religious brother and author, dilated cardiomyopathy.
- Sara Ginaite, 94, Lithuanian-born Canadian author and resistance fighter.
- Morris Halle, 94, Latvian-born American linguist.
- Claus Heß, 84, German Olympic rower (1956).
- Michael M. T. Henderson, 75-76, American linguist.
- Evert Kroon, 71, Dutch water polo player, Olympic bronze medalist (1976).
- Tuiloma Pule Lameko, 83, Samoan politician.
- Connie Lawn, 73, American journalist, longest-serving White House correspondent, Parkinson's disease.
- Winnie Madikizela-Mandela, 81, South African anti-apartheid activist and politician, MP (since 2009), complications of diabetes.
- Ahmed Janka Nabay, 54, Sierra Leonean Bubu musician.
- Elie Onana, 66, Cameroonian footballer (Canon Yaoundé, national team).
- Bill Rademacher, 75, American football player (New York Jets, New England Patriots, Northern Michigan Wildcats).
- Bo Rather, 67, American football player (Chicago Bears, Miami Dolphins).
- Laura Roslof, 69, American illustrator (Dungeons & Dragons).
- Bill Royer, 88, American politician.
- Fufi Santori, 85, Puerto Rican Olympic basketball player (1960) and writer.
- Paul Sinibaldi, 96, French footballer (Reims).
- Burton Smith, 77, American computer scientist, complications from heart disease.
- Ahmed Khaled Tawfik, 55, Egyptian novelist.
- Wilbur Ternyik, 92, American civic leader and politician.
- Minoru Uchida, 91, Japanese actor (Royal Space Force: The Wings of Honnêamise).
- Bhai Vaidya, 89, Indian politician.
- Velga Vīlipa, 78, Latvian actress.

=== 3 ===
- Bujari Ahmed, 65, Sahrawi diplomat and independentism leader, Permanent Representative of Polisario to the UN (since 1992).
- Ogilvy Berlouis, 67, Seychellois politician, Minister of Home Affairs (1977–1979), Minister of Defence (1979–1986).
- Ron Dunbar, 78, American songwriter ("Give Me Just a Little More Time", "Band of Gold", "Patches"), Grammy winner (1971).
- David Edgerton, 90, American entrepreneur, co-founder of Burger King, complications from surgery.
- David J. Foulis, 87, American mathematician.
- Seymour Glanzer, 91, American lawyer.
- Pam Golding, 89, South African real estate developer.
- Eugene M. Grant, 99, American real estate mogul.
- Mary Hatcher, 88, American actress (The Big Wheel), bile duct cancer.
- Dale Haupt, 88, American football coach (Chicago Bears, Philadelphia Eagles).
- Kelly Lai Chen, 84, Hong Kong actor.
- Lill-Babs, 80, Swedish singer ("En tuff brud i lyxförpackning", "Är du kär i mej ännu Klas-Göran?") and actress, cancer and heart failure.
- Hashem Mahameed, 73, Israeli politician, member of Knesset (1990–2003).
- Stuart Matchett, 67, Australian broadcaster, cancer.
- Charles McDew, 79, American civil rights activist.
- Howard T. Owens Jr., 83, American politician and judge.
- Arrigo Petacco, 88, Italian journalist and writer.
- Irma Rapuzzi, 107, French politician.
- Jacques Tixier, 93, French archaeologist and prehistorian.
- Zollie Toth, 94, American football player (New York Yanks, Dallas Texans, Baltimore Colts).
- Tomas Villa, 34, Mexican boxer, traffic collision.
- Leonard Gilchrist Wilson, 89, Canadian-born American science historian.
- Noela Young, 88, Australian illustrator (The Muddle-Headed Wombat, Finders Keepers).

=== 4 ===
- Ignatius Peter VIII Abdalahad, 87, Syrian Syriac Catholic hierarch, Patriarch of Antioch and all the East (2001–2008).
- Andres Ammas, 56, Estonian politician.
- David Bonetti, 71, American art critic.
- Burt Boyar, 90, American voice actor (Archie Andrews) and author.
- Don Cherry, 94, American singer ("Band of Gold") and golfer.
- Elton Georges, 74, British Virgin Islands politician, Deputy Governor (1983–2003, 2007–2008).
- Gertrude Jeannette, 103, American actress (Shaft).
- Li Zhengyou, 82, Chinese agronomist and politician, Vice-Governor of Yunnan Province.
- John Lynch, 91, British historian of Latin America.
- C. Shannon Mallory, 81, American Anglican prelate, Bishop of Botswana (1972–1978) and El Camino Real (1980–1990), leukemia.
- Tom Morrow, 79, American football player (Oakland Raiders).
- Jim Nielsen, 79, Canadian politician, MLA (1975–1986).
- Soon-Tek Oh, 85, South Korean-American actor (The Man with the Golden Gun, Mulan, M*A*S*H), Alzheimer's disease.
- Jonathan Pitre, 17, Canadian advocate for raising awareness of epidermolysis bullosa, complications from septic shock.
- Stuart Pottasch, 86, American astronomer.
- Raobail, 80, Indian cartoonist.
- Joaquín del Real, 76, Spanish Olympic rower.
- Leonid Sokov, 76, Russian artist and sculptor.
- Johnny Valiant, 71, American Hall of Fame professional wrestler (The Valiant Brothers) and manager (WWF, AWA), traffic collision.
- Clément Vincent, 86, Canadian politician, MP (1962–1966).
- Ron White, 64, Canadian actor (Copper, Unforgiven, Republic of Doyle), cancer.
- Ray Wilkins, 61, English football player (Chelsea, Manchester United) and manager (Queens Park Rangers), heart attack.

=== 5 ===
- Yuri Abramochkin, 81, Russian photographer and photojournalist.
- Grady Alderman, 79, American football player (Minnesota Vikings).
- Eric Bristow, 60, English Hall of Fame darts player, world champion (1980, 1981, 1984, 1985, 1986), heart attack.
- George Bryanchaninov, 98, Russian-Australian priest in the Russian Greek Catholic Church.
- Cynthia Chalk, 104, Canadian photographer.
- Charles de Chassiron, 69, British diplomat, cancer.
- Martin Cockerham, 67, British singer-songwriter (Spirogyra).
- Geoffrey M. Footner, 94, American maritime historian, heart failure.
- Cola Franzen, 95, American writer and translator.
- Dieter Freise, 73, German field hockey player, Olympic champion (1972).
- Lars Hall, 79, Swedish advertiser and art director.
- Ajith Kollam, 55, Indian actor, stomach illness.
- Jun Morinaga, 80, Japanese photographer.
- Tim O'Connor, 90, American actor (Peyton Place, General Hospital, Buck Rogers in the 25th Century), cancer.
- Bolette Sutermeister Petri, 97, Danish-Swiss travel writer. (death announced on this date)
- Jim Pietrzak, 65, American football player (New York Giants, New Orleans Saints, Kansas City Chiefs).
- Branislav Pokrajac, 71, Serbian handball player, Olympic champion (1972).
- Frederick D. Reese, 88, American civil rights activist.
- Saw O Moo, 42–43, Burmese environmental activist, shot.
- Mete Sozen, 87, Turkish-born American structural engineer.
- Isao Takahata, 82, Japanese film director, producer and screenwriter (Grave of the Fireflies, Only Yesterday, The Tale of the Princess Kaguya), co-founder of Studio Ghibli, lung cancer.
- Cecil Taylor, 89, American jazz pianist and poet.
- Jaime Thorne León, 74, Peruvian politician, Minister of Defense (2010–2011).
- Irina Tokmakova, 89, Russian writer.
- Raymonde Vergauwen, 90, Belgian Olympic swimmer (1952).

=== 6 ===
- Daniel Akaka, 93, American educator and politician, member of the U.S. House of Representatives from Hawaii's 2nd district (1977–1990) and Senate (1990–2013), organ failure.
- Daniel Chavarría, 84, Uruguayan-born Cuban author.
- Dorothy Garlock, 98, American historical romance author.
- Aby Gartmann, 87, Swiss Olympic bobsledder.
- Billy Gustafsson, 70, Swedish politician, MP (2002–2014).
- Jacques Higelin, 77, French pop singer.
- Raj Kishore, 85, Indian actor (Sholay), heart attack.
- Aleksandr Kurlovich, 56, Belarusian weightlifter, Olympic champion (1988, 1992).
- Senteni Masango, 37, Swazi royal, 8th wife of Mswati III of Eswatini.
- Donald McKayle, 87, American dancer and choreographer (The Great White Hope, Bedknobs and Broomsticks, The Jazz Singer).
- Colin McLeod, 96, New Zealand civil engineer, Commissioner of Works (1973–1981).
- Yaser Murtaja, 30, Palestinian journalist, shot.
- Pavol Paška, 60, Slovak politician, MP (since 2002), Speaker of the Slovak National Council (2006–2010, 2012–2014).
- Acácio Pereira Magro, 85, Portuguese politician, economist and academic, Minister of Social Affairs (1978–1979) and Commerce and Tourism (1979–1980).
- Mary Lou Sallee, 87, American politician.
- Henryk Skolimowski, 87, Polish philosopher.
- Lewis Van Bergen, 79, American actor (Bugsy, Sable).
- Edla Van Steen, 81, Brazilian playwright, actress and journalist.
- Ted Washburn, 75, American Olympic rower.
- Urbano Zea, 49, Mexican Olympic swimmer (1988), heart attack.

=== 7 ===
- Brigitte Ahrenholz, 65, German rower, Olympic champion (1976). (body discovered on this date)
- Ai Xing, 93, Chinese mechanical engineer, member of the Chinese Academy of Engineering.
- Agni Vlavianos Arvanitis, 82, American biologist.
- Gerald Ayres, 82, American studio executive (Columbia Pictures) and film producer (The Last Detail, Cisco Pike), complications from dementia.
- Munin Barua, 71, Indian film director.
- John D. Biggers, 94–95, British biologist and physiologist.
- Petr Braiko, 98, Soviet soldier, Hero of the Soviet Union.
- Petr Černý, 84, Czechoslovak-born Canadian mineralogist.
- Francisco D'Alessandri, 87, Argentine Olympic equestrian.
- Eric England, 84, American sniper.
- Peter Grünberg, 78, German physicist, co-discoverer of giant magnetoresistance, Nobel Prize laureate (2007).
- Robert C. Hicks, 91, American football player and coach.
- Gerd Honsik, 76, Austrian writer and Holocaust denier.
- Ed Kissell, 88, American football player (Pittsburgh Steelers).
- Koichi, 37, Japanese kickboxer, traffic collision.
- Li Zhen, 93, Chinese politician, Chairman of the Shandong People's Congress (1985–1996).
- Samuel B. McKinney, 91, American civil rights activist and pastor.
- Ángel Peralta Pineda, 92, Spanish rejoneador, respiratory failure.
- Božidar Smiljanić, 81, Croatian actor.
- Wang Wusheng, 73, Chinese photographer.

=== 8 ===
- Leila Abashidze, 88, Georgian actress (Keto and Kote), film director and screenwriter, stroke.
- Tate Adams, 96, Northern Irish-born Australian printmaker.
- António Barros, 68, Portuguese footballer (Benfica, national team).
- William Sperry Beinecke, 103, American philanthropist.
- Nathan Davis, 81, American jazz musician.
- Michael Goolaerts, 23, Belgian racing cyclist, heart attack.
- Juraj Herz, 83, Czech film director, actor, writer and scenic designer.
- Barbora Horáčková, 49, Czech Olympic archer (2008).
- Efraín Jara Idrovo, 92, Ecuadorian writer and existentialist poet, Premio Eugenio Espejo (1999).
- Viacheslav Koleichuk, 77, Russian sound artist.
- Fjodor Koltšin, 61, Estonian Olympic skier (1980).
- Sir Peter Le Cheminant, 97, British air chief marshal, Lieutenant Governor of Guernsey (1980–1985).
- André Lerond, 87, French footballer (Lyon, Stade Français, national team).
- Chuck McCann, 83, American voice actor (DuckTales, G.I. Joe: A Real American Hero, Fantastic Four), heart failure.
- Joe McConnell, 79, American sports announcer (Minnesota Vikings, Indiana Pacers, Chicago White Sox).
- John Miles, 74, British racing driver, complications from a stroke.
- Gunnar Persson, 84, Swedish cartoonist.
- Guy Lyon Playfair, 83, British author and paranormal researcher.
- Óscar Saavedra San Martín, 77, Bolivian physicist, astrophysicist and academic.
- R. Stephen White, 97, American physicist.

=== 9 ===
- Fredy Brupbacher, 83, Swiss Olympic alpine skier.
- Felix Chen, 75, Taiwanese conductor.
- Pierre Descoteaux, 66, Canadian lawyer and politician.
- Liam Devally, 85, Irish singer, television presenter and lawyer.
- Barney A. Ebsworth, 83, American business executive (Build-A-Bear Workshop) and art collector.
- James Endres, 86, American politician.
- Jonathan M. Hess, 52, American philologist, aneurysm.
- Dewey Martin, 94, American actor (The Big Sky, Land of the Pharaohs, Ten Thousand Bedrooms).
- Jigjidiin Mönkhbat, 76, Mongolian wrestler, Olympic silver medalist (1968).
- Gerard S. Naples, 80, American politician.
- Ira Philip, 92, Bermudian writer and politician.
- Silviniaco Conti, 12, French racehorse, team chasing accident.
- Kimberly G. Smith, 69, American biologist.
- Ruth Stewart, 101, American operatic soprano.
- Felipe Tejeda García, 83, Mexican Roman Catholic prelate, Auxiliary Bishop of México (2000–2010).
- Edward Von der Porten, 84, American scholar.
- Rob Walton, 69, Canadian ice hockey player (Minnesota Fighting Saints, Vancouver Blazers, Calgary Cowboys).

=== 10 ===
- Peter Bayley, 73, British scholar.
- Alex Beckett, 35, English actor (Twenty Twelve, W1A, I Live with Models), suicide by hanging.
- Danarto, 76, Indonesian writer and artist.
- John Dlugos, 89, Canadian football player (Edmonton Eskimos).
- F'Murr, 72, French comics artist (Le Génie des alpages).
- Samir Gharbo, 93, Egyptian Olympic water polo player (1948, 1952).
- Viliam Karmažin, 95, Slovak composer and conductor.
- Andre de Krayewski, 84, Polish-American graphic artist.
- John Lambie, 77, Scottish football player (Falkirk, St Johnstone) and manager (Partick Thistle).
- Li Dawei, 47, Chinese director (The Story of a Noble Family), intrahepatic cholangiocarcinoma.
- Li Yaowen, 99, Chinese admiral and diplomat, Political Commissar of the PLA Navy (1980–1990).
- Jean Marzollo, 75, American children's author (I Spy).
- J. D. McClatchy, 72, American poet, cancer.
- Fergie McCormick, 78, New Zealand rugby union player (Canterbury, national team), throat cancer.
- Richard Muth, 90, American economist, gallbladder cancer.
- Alastair Rellie, 83, British intelligence officer.
- Matthew Stark, 88, American civil rights activist.
- Sauro Tomà, 92, Italian football player (Torino F.C.).
- Wu Nansheng, 95, Chinese politician, party chief of Shenzhen.
- Yang Gui, 89, Chinese politician, chief designer of the Red Flag Canal.

=== 11 ===
- Gillian Ayres, 88, British abstract artist.
- Jim Caine, 91, Manx jazz pianist and radio presenter.
- Karen Dawisha, 68, American political scientist and writer (Putin's Kleptocracy), lung cancer.
- Bruce M. Fischer, 82, American actor (Escape from Alcatraz, The Outlaw Josey Wales).
- Mary Giles, 73, American fiber artist, ovarian cancer.
- Jumana El Husseini, 86, Palestinian artist.
- Li Tian, 79, Chinese physicist and aircraft designer.
- Tania Lineham, 52, New Zealand educator, complications from primary sclerosing cholangitis.
- Jorge Lozada Stanbury, 87, Peruvian agricultural engineer and politician, Member of the Congress (1963–1965), constituent deputy (1978–1980) and Speaker of the Senate (1988).
- Aimo Mäenpää, 81, Finnish Olympic wrestler.
- Robert Matthews, 56, British athlete, Paralympic champion (1984, 1988, 1992, 2000), brain tumor.
- Patrick F. McManus, 84, American writer.
- Mauro Panaggio, 90, American basketball coach (SUNY Brockport, Rochester Zeniths, Quad City Thunder).
- Polixeni Papapetrou, 57, Australian photographer, breast cancer.
- Phillip Pipersburg, 62, Belizean Olympic sprinter.
- Theo Ramos, 89, Spanish-born British painter.
- André Richer, 90, Brazilian Olympic rower.
- Michael Schlesinger, 75, American climatologist.
- Jean-Claude Servan-Schreiber, 100, French politician and journalist, MP (1965–1967).
- Mitzi Shore, 87, American comedy club owner (The Comedy Store), Parkinson's disease.
- Zola Skweyiya, 75, South African politician, Minister of Public Service and Administration (1994–1999) and Social Development (1999–2009), High Commissioner to the UK (2009–2014).
- Carmen Stănescu, 92, Romanian actress, cardiopulmonary arrest.
- Alexander Welsh, 84, American literary scholar.
- Kevin Wortman, 49, American ice hockey player (Calgary Flames, JYP Jyväskylä, Schwenninger Wild Wings).

=== 12 ===
- Gyula Babos, 68, Hungarian jazz guitarist.
- Heinrich Brändli, 79, Swiss engineer.
- Giuliano Cenci, 86, Italian animated film director (The Adventures of Pinocchio), injuries due to a fall.
- Naseem Mirza Changezi, 108, Indian independence activist.
- Ronald Chesney, 97, British comedy screenwriter (On the Buses, The Rag Trade, Romany Jones).
- Deborah Coleman, 61, American blues musician, complications from bronchitis and pneumonia.
- Stuart Devlin, 86, Australian goldsmith.
- Spas Dzhurov, 73, Bulgarian Olympic decathlete.
- Irwin Gage, 78, American pianist.
- Carlos Enrique Gómez Centurión, 93, Argentine politician, geologist and diplomat, Governor of San Juan (1971–1973, 1987–1991).
- Hu Chengzhi, 100, Chinese palaeontologist and palaeoanthropologist, discoverer of Keichousaurus.
- Rafael Grossman, 84, American rabbi.
- Brij Bhushan Kabra, 81, Indian classical slide guitar player (Call of the Valley).
- Juozas Karvelis, 83, Lithuanian politician, co-signatory of the Act of the Re-Establishment.
- Zoran Krasić, 62, Serbian politician, Minister of Trade (1998–2000).
- Alan Lloyd, 91, British writer and journalist.
- Oliver Lozano, 77, Filipino lawyer and politician.
- Nestor Mata, 92, Filipino journalist.
- John Melcher, 93, American politician, member of the U.S. House of Representatives from Montana's 2nd district (1969–1977) and Senate (1977–1989).
- Mark Merrill, 62, American football player (New York Jets, Denver Broncos, Buffalo Bills).
- Neil Nugent, 91, British field hockey player, Olympic bronze medalist (1952).
- Len Okrie, 94, American baseball player and coach (Washington Senators, Boston Red Sox).
- Bob Pickens, 75, American wrestler and football player (Chicago Bears).
- Sergio Pitol, 85, Mexican novelist and translator, Miguel de Cervantes Prize (2005), aphasia.
- Dame Daphne Sheldrick, 83, Kenyan-British conservationist, breast cancer.
- Włodzimierz Smoliński, 80, Polish Olympic wrestler.
- Kiyoko Takeda, 100, Japanese scholar.

=== 13 ===
- Yogesh Atal, 80, Indian sociologist.
- Art Bell, 72, American author (The Coming Global Superstorm) and radio host (Coast to Coast AM, Art Bell's Dark Matter), chronic obstructive pulmonary disease.
- Zbigniew Bujarski, 84, Polish composer.
- Cesarino Cervellati, 88, Italian football player and manager (Bologna).
- Ron Cooper, 79, English footballer (Peterborough United).
- Isa Degener, 93, German-born American plant collector and botanist.
- Barrie Dexter, 96, Australian diplomat and public servant.
- J. Harold Ellens, 84, American psychologist and theologian.
- Walter Fink, 87, German entrepreneur and music patron.
- Miloš Forman, 86, Czech-American film director (One Flew Over the Cuckoo's Nest, Amadeus, The People vs. Larry Flynt), Oscar winner (1976, 1985).
- Joy Laville, 94, English-Mexican artist, National Prize for Arts and Sciences (2012).
- André Maman, 90, French politician and Romance philologist, Senator (1992–2001).
- Graeme Mitchison, 73, English mathematician.
- William Nack, 77, American journalist (Newsday, Sports Illustrated) and author.
- Tata Subba Rao, 75–76, Indian-born British statistician.
- Lidia Redondo de Lucas, 52, Spanish librist and politician, Senator (2005–2008).
- Jesús Rodríguez, 84, Spanish Olympic weightlifter.
- Marc Rowell, 80, Australian politician, member of the Queensland Legislative Assembly for Hinchinbrook (1989–2006).
- Clive Stanbrook, 70, British barrister.
- Joan Staniswalis, 60, American statistician.
- Fernando Tamayo Tamayo, 68, Colombian economist and politician, MP (1994–2010) and Senator (since 2010), cancer.
- Owen Webster, 89, American chemist.
- Gus Weill, 85, American political writer and strategist.

=== 14 ===
- Rajendra Bhalekar, 66, Indian cricketer, multiple organ failure.
- Isabella Biagini, 74, Italian actress (Love Italian Style, Il clan dei due Borsalini, The Future Is Woman), complications from a stroke.
- Colin Bland, 80, South African cricketer (national team).
- Stewart M. Brandborg, 93, American conservation activist.
- Frank Bren, 74, Australian actor and playwright.
- David Buckel, 60, American LGBT rights lawyer, suicide by self-immolation.
- Daedra Charles, 49, American basketball player (Los Angeles Sparks), Olympic bronze medalist (1992).
- Hal Greer, 81, American Hall of Fame basketball player (Philadelphia 76ers), NBA champion (1967).
- Sam Hamill, 74, American poet and publisher.
- Michael D. Healy, 91, American military officer.
- Robert Holmes, 72, American football player (Kansas City Chiefs, Houston Oilers).
- Ram Kumar, 93, Indian artist.
- Jean-Claude Malgoire, 77, French conductor.
- Jon Michelet, 73, Norwegian author (Orion's Belt), cancer.
- Gerald Nachman, 80, American journalist and author.
- Roger G. Newton, 93, German-born American physicist.
- Stan Reynolds, 92, British jazz musician.
- Armando Salgado, 80, Mexican photographer and photojournalist (Corpus Christi massacre), pancreatic cancer.
- Neil Shand, 84, British comedy writer (Q..., The Russ Abbot Show) and journalist (Daily Mail).
- Kirk Simon, 63, American documentarian (Strangers No More, Chimps: So Like Us, Rehearsing a Dream), Oscar winner (2011), cardiac arrest.
- André Sterling, 94, Belgian civil engineer.
- Frank Varga, 74, Hungarian-born American sculptor, cancer.

=== 15 ===
- Shirley Barrie, 72, Canadian writer.
- Hadassa Ben-Itto, 91, Polish-born Israeli judge and writer.
- Maksim Borodin, 32-33, Russian journalist, complications after falling from his fifth-floor balcony.
- Bob Braden, 84, American computer scientist.
- Rinaldo Fidel Brédice, 85, Argentine Roman Catholic prelate, Bishop of Santa Rosa (1992–2008).
- Philip D'Antoni, 89, American film producer (The French Connection, Bullitt, The Seven-Ups), Oscar winner (1972).
- Frank Drowota, 79, American judge, Chief Justice of the Tennessee Supreme Court (1989–1990; 2000–2005).
- R. Lee Ermey, 74, American actor (Full Metal Jacket, Mississippi Burning, Toy Story) and military drill instructor, complications from pneumonia.
- Michael Halliday, 93, English-born Australian linguist.
- Beatrix Hamburg, 94, American psychiatrist, Alzheimer's disease.
- Frank Heiss, 46, American electronic record producer.
- Luise Hercus, 92, German-born Australian linguist.
- Judy Kennedy, 73, American politician, Mayor of Newburgh, New York (since 2012), ovarian cancer.
- Kenneth Matiba, 85, Kenyan politician, MP (1972–1990, 1992–1997).
- Boki Milošević, 86, Serbian clarinetist.
- Miriam Naveira, 83, Puerto Rican jurist, first woman Associate Justice (1985–2003) and Chief Justice of the Supreme Court (2003–2004).
- George Oster, 77, American biologist.
- Domenico Pittella, 86, Italian politician, Senator (1972–1983), complications from a broken hip.
- Edward Diego Reyes, 88, Guamanian politician, Lieutenant Governor of Guam (1983–1987).
- Neena Schwartz, 91, American endocrinologist.
- Waqar Ahmad Shah, 74, Indian politician, MLA (1993–2017).
- Frank Skartados, 62, Greek-born American politician, member of the New York State Assembly (2009–2010, since 2012), pancreatic cancer.
- Vittorio Taviani, 88, Italian film director (Padre Padrone, Kaos, Caesar Must Die).
- Raquel Trindade, 81, Brazilian artist, folklorist, and writer, complications from surgery.
- Tüvdiin Tserendondov, 83, Mongolian Olympic sport shooter.
- Stefano Zappalà, 77, Italian politician, MEP (1999–2009), respiratory failure.
- H. Dieter Zeh, 85, German theoretical physicist.

=== 16 ===
- Harry Anderson, 65, American actor (Night Court, Dave's World, It) and magician, stroke.
- Gustav Victor Rudolf Born, 96, German-born British pharmacologist.
- Vic Bubas, 91, American college basketball coach (Duke Blue Devils).
- Carlos Chasseing, 91, Argentine politician, De facto Federal Interventor of Córdoba (1976–1979).
- Choi Eun-hee, 91, South Korean actress (The Lovers and the Despot).
- Florea Dumitrescu, 91, Romanian politician and diplomat, Minister of Finance (1969–1978), Governor of the National Bank (1984–1989).
- Sir Roger Elliott, 89, British theoretical physicist.
- Beverley Farmer, 77, Australian novelist and short story writer.
- Giant's Causeway, 21, American racehorse and sire.
- Pamela Gidley, 52, American actress (The Pretender, Twin Peaks: Fire Walk with Me, CSI: Crime Scene Investigation) and model.
- Earl B. Gustafson, 90, American judge and politician, member of the Minnesota House of Representatives (1963–1967, 1969–1971), dementia.
- Fred Haberlein, 73, American artist.
- Ken Hottman, 69, American baseball player (Chicago White Sox).
- Henri Landwirth, 91, Belgian hotelier and philanthropist, founder of Give Kids the World Village.
- Dona Ivone Lara, 97, Brazilian singer and composer.
- Robert M. Lindholm, 82, American photographer.
- Lü Chuanzan, 85, Chinese politician, Chairman of Hebei Provincial People's Congress (1993–1998).
- Ivan Mauger, 78, New Zealand motorcycle speedway rider, world champion (1968, 1969, 1970, 1972, 1977, 1979).
- Matthew Mellon, 54, American billionaire investor, heart attack.
- Napsiah Omar, 74, Malaysian politician, liver cancer.
- Alejandro Rojas Wainer, 73, Chilean politician and academic, President of University of Chile Student Federation (1970–1973) and deputy (1973).
- Richard Rothstein, 74-75, American screenwriter (Universal Soldier, Bates Motel) and television producer (The Hitchhiker).
- Sax Man, 65, American street saxophonist.
- George N. Skene, 92, American politician.
- Paul Singer, 86, Austrian-born Brazilian economist, co-founder of Partido dos Trabalhadores.
- Lynn A. Stout, 60, American legal scholar, cancer.
- Rein Tölp, 76, Estonian Olympic middle-distance runner (1964).
- Martin J. Whitman, 93, American investment advisor.

=== 17 ===
- John Amirante, 83, American anthem singer (New York Rangers).
- Rosemary Bamforth, 93, British pathologist and code breaker.
- Big Tom, 81, Irish country music singer.
- Barbara Bush, 92, American political matriarch and literacy advocate, First Lady (1989–1993) and Second Lady (1981–1989), complications from COPD and heart failure.
- Joan Chase, 81, American novelist.
- Gérard Desanghere, 70, Belgian footballer (R.S.C. Anderlecht, R.W.D. Molenbeek).
- Ken Dolan, 75, American journalist and broadcaster, cancer.
- Dick Fichtner, 78, American college basketball coach (Occidental Tigers, Pacific Tigers).
- David Edward Foley, 88, American Roman Catholic prelate, Bishop of Birmingham (1994–2005), bone cancer.
- Peter Guidi, 68, Italian jazz saxophonist and flutist, Creutzfeldt–Jakob disease.
- Marcia Hafif, 88, American artist.
- Carl Kasell, 84, American radio journalist (Morning Edition) and quiz show judge (Wait Wait... Don't Tell Me!), complications from Alzheimer's disease.
- Amoroso Katamsi, 79, Indonesian actor (Pengkhianatan G30S/PKI).
- Nils Malmer, 89, Swedish ecologist.
- Richard Oldenburg, 84, Swedish museum curator, Director of the Museum of Modern Art (1972–1995).
- Vel Phillips, 94, American attorney and politician, Secretary of State of Wisconsin (1979–1983).
- Philibert Randriambololona, 90, Malagasy Roman Catholic prelate, Bishop of Antsirabe (1989–1992) and Archbishop of Fianarantsoa (1992–2002).
- Karl Rawer, 104, German physicist.
- Judith Révész, 102, Hungarian-Dutch potter and sculptor.
- Randy Scruggs, 64, American music producer, songwriter ("Angel in Disguise", "Love Has No Right", "We Danced Anyway") and guitarist, multiple Grammy winner.
- T. V. R. Shenoy, 76, Indian journalist (Malayala Manorama).
- Maurice Sion, 90, Yugoslav-born American-Canadian mathematician.

=== 18 ===
- Karl Wolfgang Boer, 92, German-born American physicist.
- Robert F. Chapman, 91, American judge.
- Kevin Colson, 80, Australian actor.
- Frank B. Dilley, 86, American philosopher.
- Sir Clive Elliott, 72, British ornithologist and civil servant, cancer.
- Jean Flori, 82, French medieval historian.
- Grigory Gamarnik, 88, Soviet-born Ukrainian Olympic wrestler (1960).
- Jerry Green, 79, American politician, member of the New Jersey General Assembly (since 1992).
- Tsuyoshi Hiroshige, 70, Japanese martial artist.
- John Hope, 47, American baseball player (Pittsburgh Pirates).
- Paul Jones, 75, American professional wrestler and manager (JCP, PNW, CWF).
- Joan Konner, 87, American academic and journalist, Dean of the Columbia School of Journalism, leukemia.
- George Lefferts, 96, American television writer.
- Luisa Pastor Lillo, 69, Spanish politician, President of Province of Alicante (2011–2015) and Mayor of Sant Vicent del Raspeig (2001–2015), cancer.
- Howard Sachar, 90, American historian.
- Bruno Sammartino, 82, Italian-American Hall of Fame professional wrestler (WWWF), longest-reigning Heavyweight Champion (1963–1971, 1973–1977), multiple organ failure.
- Joël Santoni, 74, French film director (Scrambled Eggs) and screenwriter.
- Willibald Sauerländer, 94, German art historian.
- Henk Schouten, 86, Dutch footballer (Feyenoord, national team).
- James Whelan, 81, American politician, member of the Pennsylvania House of Representatives (1974–1976).
- Jeanne Wilson, 92, American Olympic swimmer (1948).
- Dale Winton, 62, English radio DJ and television presenter (Dale's Supermarket Sweep, Hole in the Wall, The National Lottery: In It to Win It).
- Alphonse Yanghat, 70, Congolese Olympic sprinter.

=== 19 ===
- Graciela Agudelo, 72, Mexican pianist and composer.
- Olivia Arévalo, 81, Peruvian Shipibo-Conibo plant medicine healer, and environmental and cultural rights activist, shot.
- Allan M. Campbell, 88, American microbiologist.
- John Carroll, 93, Irish labor union leader.
- Evžen Čermák, 85, Czech Olympic alpine skier.
- Dharam Pal Choudhary, 66, Indian politician, liver disease.
- Stuart Colman, 73, English musician, record producer and broadcaster, cancer.
- Sören Danielsson, 88, Swedish Olympic boxer.
- John Duffie, 72, American baseball player (Los Angeles Dodgers).
- Darrell Eastlake, 75, Australian television presenter and sports commentator (Nine Network), Alzheimer's disease and emphysema.
- Arnold Eidslott, 91, Norwegian poet.
- Christine Floss, 56, German-born American cosmochemist.
- Pat Heenan, 80, American football player (Washington Redskins).
- Joseph Hoover, 85, American actor (The Man Who Shot Liberty Valance, Hell Is for Heroes, Stagecoach).
- Cornelius Jakobs, 93, Estonian Russian Orthodox hierarch, Metropolitan Bishop of Tallinn and all Estonia (since 1992).
- Zacharias Jimenez, 70, Filipino Roman Catholic prelate, Bishop of Pagadian (1994–2003) and Auxiliary Bishop of Butuan (2003–2009).
- Donald C. Leidel, 90, American diplomat.
- Soso Lorho, 79, Indian politician.
- Vladimir Lyakhov, 76, Ukrainian-born Russian cosmonaut (Soyuz 32, Soyuz T-9, Soyuz TM-6).
- Pepe Mediavilla, 77, Spanish voice actor.
- Luis Montes Mieza, 68–69, Spanish anesthetist and pro-euthanasia activist, heart attack.
- Walter Moody, 83, American convicted murderer, execution by lethal injection.
- Herbert Pilch, 91, German linguist and celtologist.
- Saleh Ali al-Sammad, 39, Yemeni politician, President of the Houthi Supreme Political Council (since 2016), air strike.
- Gil Santos, 80, American sportscaster (New England Patriots, WBZ).
- Mark Vallance, 72, British rock climber and mountaineer, complications from Parkinson's disease.
- Agnès-Marie Valois, 103, French nun and World War II nurse.
- Abraham Viruthakulangara, 74, Indian Roman Catholic prelate, Bishop of Khandwa (1977–1998) and Archbishop of Nagpur (since 1998).

=== 20 ===
- George Alusik, 83, American baseball player (Kansas City Athletics, Detroit Tigers).
- Avicii, 28, Swedish electronic musician, DJ and record producer ("Wake Me Up", "Hey Brother", "Levels"), suicide by exsanguination.
- Roy Bentley, 93, English footballer (Chelsea, Fulham, national team).
- Eddie Blackburn, 61, English footballer (Hull City, Hartlepool United, York City).
- Earle Bruce, 87, American football coach (Ohio State), Alzheimer's disease.
- Leopoldo Cantancio, 54, Filipino Olympic boxer (1984, 1988), Asian Games silver (1986) and bronze medalist (1990), traffic collision.
- Khurshid Drabu, 72, Indian-born English judge and Muslim community leader.
- Pedro Erquicia, 75, Spanish journalist.
- Bob Gale, 84, English cricketer (Middlesex).
- Anne Gibson, Baroness Gibson of Market Rasen, 77, British trade unionist and life peer.
- Tom Jones, 87, Australian rules footballer (Carlton, Footscray).
- Grace Jelagat Kipchoim, 56, Kenyan politician, member of the National Assembly (since 2013), cancer.
- James Ajongo Mawut, 57, South Sudanese army commander.
- Nie Bichu, 90, Chinese politician, mayor of Tianjin (1993–1998).
- Jim Novak, 62, American comic book letterer (Avengers, Doctor Strange, Fantastic Four).
- John Petercuskie, 93, American football coach (Dartmouth College, Princeton).
- Rajinder Sachar, 94, Indian judge.
- James F. Sirmons, 100, American broadcasting executive (CBS).
- John Stride, 81, British actor (The Main Chance, The Omen, A Bridge Too Far).
- Pavel Šrut, 78, Czech poet, writer and translator.
- Al Swift, 82, American broadcaster and politician, member of the U.S. House of Representatives from Washington's 2nd district (1979–1995), idiopathic pulmonary fibrosis.
- John Waller, 77, American fight director.
- Shane Yarran, 28, Australian footballer (Fremantle, Subiaco), suicide.
- Charles Zwick, 91, American civil servant, Director of the Bureau of the Budget (1968–1969).

=== 21 ===
- Fadi Mohammad al-Batsh, 35, Palestinian engineer and academic, shot.
- Anwara Begum, 83, Bangladeshi academic and First Lady (2002–2009).
- Zoran Bojović, 81–82, Serbian architect.
- Robert M. Blakeman, 92, American politician, member of the New York State Assembly (1961–1966).
- Pierre Ceyrac, 71, French politician, MEP (1989–1994).
- Nina Doroshina, 83, Russian actress (Love and Pigeons).
- William F. Dowd, 74, American politician, member of the New Jersey General Assembly.
- Dee Hardison, 61, American football player (Buffalo Bills, New York Giants, San Diego Chargers).
- Ron Hayter, 81, Canadian politician.
- Robert Kates, 89, American geographer.
- Firmin Le Bourhis, 67, French author, heart attack.
- Neff Maiava, 93, American Samoan professional wrestler.
- Jim Miceli, 83, American politician, member of the Massachusetts House of Representatives (since 1977), heart attack.
- Les Pearce, 94, Welsh rugby league player and coach (Halifax).
- Desmond Saunders, 91, British film and television director.
- Nelson Pereira dos Santos, 89, Brazilian filmmaker (Vidas Secas, How Tasty Was My Little Frenchman), liver cancer.
- Nabi Tajima, 117, Japanese supercentenarian, world's oldest living person and last living verified person born in the 19th century.
- Huguette Tourangeau, 79, Canadian operatic mezzo-soprano.
- Verne Troyer, 49, American actor (Austin Powers, The Imaginarium of Doctor Parnassus, Harry Potter and the Philosopher's Stone), suicide by alcohol poisoning.
- Paul Younger, 55, British hydrogeologist and environmental engineer.

=== 22 ===
- Wakil Hussain Allahdad, 32, Afghan wrestler, bombing.
- Keith Ashfield, 66, Canadian politician, MP (2008–2015) and MLA (1999–2008).
- Demeter Bitenc, 95, Slovenian actor (Outsider).
- Wiam Dahmani, 34, Moroccan singer and actress, heart attack.
- Per K. Enge, 64, Norwegian-born American engineer.
- Roy Haggerty, 58, English rugby league player (St Helens, Barrow).
- Ken Hofmann, 95, American businessman and sports team owner (Oakland Athletics).
- Richard Jenrette, 89, American investor (Donaldson, Lufkin & Jenrette), cancer.
- Gary Jordan, 76, English rugby league footballer.
- Nino Khurtsidze, 42, Georgian Grandmaster chess player, International Master (1999), cancer.
- Dave Nelson, 73, American baseball player (Texas Rangers, Cleveland Indians) and broadcaster (Milwaukee Brewers), liver cancer.
- Ivan Neumyvakin, 89, Russian physician.
- Terence T. O'Malley, 73, American politician.
- Balantrapu Rajanikanta Rao, 98, Indian writer, composer and musicologist.
- Charlie Rice, 98, American jazz drummer.
- Kona Schwenke, 25, American football player (Notre Dame Fighting Irish).
- Hoyt Patrick Taylor Jr., 94, American politician, Lieutenant Governor of North Carolina (1969–1973).

=== 23 ===
- Liri Belishova, 91, Albanian politician and resistance member during World War II.
- Don Bustany, 89, American radio and television broadcaster (American Top 40).
- Bennie Cunningham, 63, American football player (Pittsburgh Steelers), cancer.
- Anne Dickson-Waiko, 67, Papua New Guinean historian and academic.
- Haddon Donald, 101, New Zealand Army lieutenant colonel and politician, MP for Wairarapa (1963–1969).
- Bob Dorough, 94, American pianist, singer and composer (Schoolhouse Rock!).
- Giovanni Galloni, 90, Italian politician.
- Don Hall, 78, Australian rules footballer (Carlton).
- Lyall Hanson, 88, Canadian politician.
- Isamu Imoto, 92, Japanese politician, Governor of Saga Prefecture (1991–2003).
- Sachio Kinugasa, 71, Japanese baseball player, colon cancer.
- Al Lavan, 71, American football player (Atlanta Falcons) and coach (Dallas Cowboys, Baltimore Ravens).
- Gennady Leonov, 71, Russian mathematician and mechanic.
- Béla Magyari, 68, Hungarian air force colonel (Hungarian Astronautical Society).
- Patrick James McGlinchey, 89, Irish Roman Catholic missionary, myocardial infarction and kidney failure.
- Jerrold Meinwald, 91, American chemist.
- Donald O'Brien, 87, French-Irish actor.
- Alice Provensen, 99, American children's illustrator and writer.
- Herman Rubin, 91, American statistician and mathematician.
- Arthur B. Rubinstein, 80, American film composer (WarGames, Stakeout, Lost in America), cancer.
- Traudl Ruckser, 93, Austrian Olympic gymnast.
- Bob Schermerhorn, 75, American college basketball coach (Riverside City Tigers, Southern Utah Thunderbirds, Arizona State Sun Devils).
- Art Simmons, 92, American jazz pianist, stomach cancer.
- Doreen Simmons, 85, British sumo wrestling commentator.
- Arthur R.G. Solmssen, 89, American novelist.
- Edward W. Tayler, 87, American literary scholar.
- Henk Temming, 94, Dutch footballer (VV DOS).
- Vladimír Weiss, 78, Slovak footballer (Inter Bratislava), Olympic silver medalist (1964).
- Barrie Williams, 79, British football coach and manager (Sutton United).
- Leland B. Yeager, 93, American economist.

=== 24 ===
- Belal Chowdhury, 79, Bangladeshi poet.
- Angelos Delivorrias, 80, Greek art historian and academic (University of Athens), Director of Benaki Museum (1973–2015) and member of the Academy of Athens (since 2016).
- Rick Dickinson, 61, British industrial designer, cancer.
- Arthur Eustace, 92, New Zealand sprinter, British Empire Games bronze medalist (1950), and sports administrator.
- Victor Garaigordóbil Berrizbeitia, 102, Spanish Roman Catholic prelate, Bishop of Los Rios (1963–1982).
- Dinu C. Giurescu, 91, Romanian historian.
- Paul Gray, 54, Australian musician (Wa Wa Nee), myeloma.
- Lee Howard, 94, American baseball player (Pittsburgh Pirates).
- Christine Jewitt, 91, Canadian baseball player (AAGPBL).
- Anders Kvissberg, 89, Swedish Olympic sport shooter.
- Ilja Matouš, 87, Czech Olympic cross-country skier (1956).
- Henri Michel, 70, French football player (Nantes) and coach (national team).
- Maria Oeyen, 87, Belgian Olympic swimmer.
- Hariton Pushwagner, 77, Norwegian artist.
- Marv Rackley, 96, American baseball player (Brooklyn Dodgers).
- Susan Shadburne, 75, American screenwriter (The Adventures of Mark Twain) and film director Shadow Play).
- Quentin Sickels, 91, American football player (Michigan Wolverines).
- Leszek Skorupa, 66, Polish Olympic weightlifter.
- Emma Smith, 94, English author (Maidens' Trip).
- André Tarallo, 92, French businessman (Elf Aquitaine).
- Susan Williams, 66, American marine biologist, traffic collision.

=== 25 ===
- Abbas, 74, Iranian photographer.
- Shuhrat Abbosov, 87, Uzbek actor, film director (Mahallada duv-duv gap), screenwriter (The Mischievous Boy) and film producer.
- Adebayo Adedeji, 87, Nigerian politician and diplomat.
- Laura Aguilar, 58, American photographer, complications from diabetes.
- Michael Anderson, 98, British film director (The Dam Busters, Around the World in 80 Days, Logan's Run), heart disease.
- Rolla Anderson, 97, American football and basketball player and coach.
- Issi Baran, 90, Finnish Olympic sprinter.
- Dick Bate, 71, English football player and manager (Southend United).
- Bill Brown, 92, American track athlete, Pan-American champion (1951).
- Margo Buchanan-Oliver, New Zealand academic.
- Paul N. Carlin, 86, American businessman, Postmaster General (1985–1986), bronchitis and pneumonia.
- Gregorio Casal, 82, Mexican actor (La Choca).
- Jacquelyn Crowell, 30, American racing cyclist, brain cancer.
- David Edwards, 89, British Anglican priest, Chaplain to the Speaker of the House of Commons (1972–1978), Dean of Norwich (1978–1983), Provost of Southwark (1983–1994).
- Madeeha Gauhar, 61, Pakistani actress (Burqavaganza) and founder of Ajoka Theatre, cancer.
- Yeshayahu Hadari, 84, Israeli rabbi, first rosh yeshiva of Yeshivat HaKotel.
- Bjørn Hansen, 79, Norwegian football coach (Rosenborg BK).
- Fredric Hobbs, 86, American artist and filmmaker.
- Inuka, 27, Singaporean polar bear, first born in the tropics, euthanized by anaesthesia.
- Kato Khandwala, 47, American record producer (My Chemical Romance, Breaking Benjamin, Papa Roach), injuries sustained in traffic collision.
- Hans-Reinhard Koch, 88, German Roman Catholic prelate, Auxiliary Bishop of Erfurt (1985–2004).
- Jerry L. Larson, 81, American judge, Justice of the Iowa Supreme Court (1978–2008).
- Lisiate Lavulo, 56, Tongan Olympic boxer.
- Edith MacArthur, 92, Scottish actress (Take the High Road).
- Steven Marcus, 89, American literary critic and scholar.
- Alberto Marson, 93, Brazilian basketball player, Olympic bronze medalist (1948).
- Cveto Pretnar, 61, Slovenian Olympic ice hockey player (1984).
- Rollin Putzier, 52, American football player (Pittsburgh Steelers, San Francisco 49ers).
- Bill Stokes, 89, American college basketball coach (Middle Tennessee Blue Raiders).
- M. S. Rajeswari, 86, Indian playback singer.
- Anam Vivekananda Reddy, 67, Indian politician, MLA for Nellore Rural (1999–2009), prostate cancer.
- Donald Seldin, 97, American nephrologist.
- Soni Wolf, 69, American lesbian activist, co-founder of Dykes on Bikes.

=== 26 ===
- Noble Craig, 69, American actor (Big Trouble in Little China, A Nightmare on Elm Street 5: The Dream Child, The Blob).
- Robert diGrazia, 90, American police officer.
- Jean Duprat, 81, French politician, member of the National Assembly (1981–1986).
- A. Theodore Eastman, 89, American Episcopal prelate, Bishop of Maryland (1986–1994), Parkinson's disease.
- Jon Engen, 61, American Olympic skier.
- Betty Hall, 97, American politician, four-time member of the New Hampshire House of Representatives.
- Philip H. Hoff, 93, American politician, Governor of Vermont (1963–1969).
- Yoshinobu Ishii, 79, Japanese football player and manager.
- Shamsul Islam, 86, Bangladeshi politician, Minister of Information (1991–1996, 2001–2006).
- Félix Mata, 67, Venezuelan Olympic sprinter.
- Sean McPherson, 47, American politician, member of the South Dakota House of Representatives (since 2017), cancer.
- David Mitchell, 77, New Zealand architect.
- Charles Neville, 79, American saxophonist (The Neville Brothers), Grammy winner (1990), pancreatic cancer.
- Jordan Nikolić, 84, Serbian folk singer.
- Henk Numan, 62, Dutch judoka, Olympic bronze medallist (1980).
- Elvira Orphée, 95, Argentine writer, Guggenheim Fellow (1988).
- Gianfranco Parolini, 93, Italian film director (Francis the Smuggler, Kiss Kiss, Kill Kill, If You Meet Sartana Pray for Your Death).
- Pierre Plateau, 94, French Roman Catholic prelate, Archbishop of Bourges (1984–2000).
- Donald Whitton, 94, Canadian concert cellist and teacher.
- Wolfgang Zapf, 81, German sociologist.

=== 27 ===
- Álvaro Arzú, 72, Guatemalan politician, President (1996–2000), Mayor of Guatemala City (1986–1990, since 2004), heart attack.
- Yukiji Asaoka, 82, Japanese actress, Alzheimer's disease.
- Earl Balfour, 85, Canadian ice hockey player (Chicago Blackhawks, Toronto Maple Leafs), cancer.
- Livio Besso Cordero, 70, Italian politician, Senator (1996–2001).
- Bob Gessner, 85, American artist.
- Donald Keats, 88, American composer.
- Maya Kuliyeva, 97, Turkmen operatic soprano and actress.
- Michael Luscombe, 64, Australian chief executive (Woolworths Limited), Creutzfeldt–Jakob disease.
- Gildo Mahones, 88, American jazz pianist.
- George Mulhall, 81, Scottish football player (Aberdeen, Sunderland, national team) and manager.
- Kristin Nelson, 72, American actress, painter and author, heart attack.
- Juan Carlos Olivas, 34, Mexican actor (El Chapo), cancer.
- Paul Junger Witt, 77, American film and television producer (Dead Poets Society, The Golden Girls, Soap), cancer.
- Bernard Woma, 51, Ghanaian gyile player.
- Roy Young, 83, British singer and pianist.

=== 28 ===
- Roberto Angleró, 88, Puerto Rican music composer and singer.
- Bob Byler, 87, American jazz journalist.
- James H. Cone, 79, American Methodist theologian (Black theology).
- Larry Harvey, 70, American artist, philanthropist and activist, founder of the Burning Man festival, complications from a stroke.
- James Hylton, 83, American stock car racing driver (NASCAR, ARCA) and race team owner (James Hylton Motorsports), traffic collision.
- Hollis Jeffcoat, 65, American painter, ovarian cancer.
- Akhumzi Jezile, 29, South African television presenter and actor, traffic collision.
- Brooks Kerr, 66, American jazz pianist.
- Eric Koch, 98, German-born Canadian author, broadcaster and academic.
- Gerson Leiber, 96, American painter, heart attack.
- Judith Leiber, 97, Hungarian-born American fashion designer and businesswoman, Holocaust survivor.
- Ramón López Carrozas, 80, Spanish-born Brazilian Roman Catholic prelate, Auxiliary Bishop (1979–1989) and Bishop of Bom Jesus do Gurguéia (1989–2014).
- Ken Messer, 86, British painter.
- Tetsuro Miura, 62, Japanese football player and manager, lung cancer.
- Art Paul, 93, American graphic designer (Playboy), pneumonia.
- Montse Pérez, 61, Spanish actress (Plats Bruts).
- Carlos del Pozo, 75, Cuban Olympic basketball player (1968).
- Russell Renfrey, 94, Australian football player.
- Agildo Ribeiro, 86, Brazilian actor.
- Art Shay, 96, American photographer (Sports Illustrated, Life) and writer, heart failure.
- Morag Crichton Timbury, 87, Scottish virologist.
- Yevgeny Titarenko, 82, Russian writer.
- Karl Toft, 81, Canadian sex offender, lung cancer.
- Bruce Tulloh, 82, British athlete, European champion (1962), cancer.

=== 29 ===
- Eliudis Benítez, 63, Puerto Rican Olympic judoka.
- Richard L. Collins, 84, American aviation journalist.
- Ewa Dyakowska-Berbeka, 61, Polish painter and graphic and stage designer.
- Luis García Meza, 88, Bolivian general and politician, President (1980–1981), heart attack.
- Bill Hay, 83, Australian rules footballer (Hawthorn).
- Baki İlkin, 74, Turkish diplomat.
- Derek Keys, 86, South African executive (ASEA, Sandvik, Sappi) and politician, Minister of Finance (1992–1994).
- Rose Laurens, 65, French singer-songwriter ("I Dreamed a Dream", "Africa").
- Robert Mandan, 86, American actor (Soap, The Best Little Whorehouse in Texas, Three's a Crowd).
- Michael Martin, Baron Martin of Springburn, 72, British politician, MP (1979–2009) and Speaker of the House of Commons (2000–2009).
- William D. Naftel, 77, Canadian writer and historian.
- Andrzej Orłoś, 84, Polish Olympic equestrian (1960).
- Lester James Peries, 99, Sri Lankan film producer, director, and screenwriter.
- Trevor Preston, 79, British screenwriter.
- Jan Salter, 82, British artist and animal sanctuary keeper.
- Reginald C. Stuart, 74, Canadian historian.
- Edward Szmidt, 86, Polish Olympic sprinter (1956).
- Bruce Taafe, 73, Australian rugby union player.
- Aaron Traywick, 28, American life extension activist, drowned.

=== 30 ===
- Tim Calvert, 52, American rock guitarist (Nevermore, Forbidden), amyotrophic lateral sclerosis.
- Jan Cameron, 71, Australian swimmer and coach, Olympic silver (1964) and Commonwealth Games triple medalist (1966).
- Geneviève Claisse, 82, French abstract painter.
- Manfredo do Carmo, 89, Brazilian mathematician (differential geometry).
- Frank Ernaga, 87, American baseball player (Chicago Cubs).
- Hortensio Fucil, 79, Venezuelan Olympic runner.
- Neil D. Humphrey, 89, American academic.
- Elisa Izaurralde, 58, Uruguayan biochemist.
- Anatole Katok, 73, Russian-born American mathematician.
- Joel Kovel, 81, American environmentalist and anti-war activist.
- Idris Hasan Latif, 94, Indian military officer, Chief of Air Staff (1978–1981).
- Terry Mackenroth, 68, Australian politician, Deputy Premier of Queensland (2000–2005), lung cancer.
- Shah Marai, 40, Afghan photojournalist (Agence France-Presse), bombing.
- Jhoon Rhee, 86, South Korean taekwondo practitioner.
- Gajendra Narayan Singh, Indian musicologist.
- Naresh Sohal, 78, Indian composer.
- Ralph Stephan, 89, American Olympic rower (1948).
- Sir John Treacher, 93, British Royal Navy Admiral, Commander-in-Chief Fleet (1975–1977).
- David Wiegand, 70, American journalist (San Francisco Chronicle).
