= Endres =

Endres is a German surname. The name is well established and quite distinguished in the Franconia region in the Southern German State of Bavaria. This area is likely where the name originated, as there are also spelling variations in this area such as Endress, and more rarely Endrass. Although the name is not restricted to this area exclusively, as families have moved over the centuries to other regions within Germany, the majority are still found in Franconia and the southern and western areas of Germany.

Notable people with the surname include:

Surname Endres

- Daniel Endres (born 1985), German footballer
- Gustavo Endres (born 1975), Brazilian volleyball player
- Hans Endres (1911–2004), German academic and writer
- Hans-Edgar Endres (1894–?), German bobsledder
- James Endres (1931–2018), American politician
- Johann Nepomuk Endres (1730-1791), German theologian
- John Endres, American civil engineer
- Karl Endres (1911–1993), German baseball player
- Marc Endres (born 1991), German footballer
- Matthias Endres (1852–?), American lawyer and politician
- Michael Endres (born 1961), German classical pianist
- Murilo Endres (born 1981), Brazilian volleyball player
- Ronja Endres (born 1986), German politician
- Theodor Endres (1876–1956), German general
- Thomas Endres (born 1969), German fencer

Surname Endress

- Al Endress (1929–2023), American football defensive end
- Edgar Endress (born 1970), Chilean artist
- Georg Endress (1924–2008), German-Swiss entrepreneur
- Ned Endress (1918–2010), American basketball player
- Vic Endress (1903–1970), American football blocking back

Surname Endrass

- Engelbert Endrass (1911–1941), German U-boat Commander

Surname Endreß

- Artur Endreß (1932–2025), German ice hockey player
- Jochen Endreß (born 1972), German football player

== See also ==
- 7361 Endres, a main-belt asteroid
