= Häberlin =

Häberlin, anglicized Haberlin or Haeberlin, is a Germanic surname common in Germany, Austria, and Switzerland. Through widespread diffusion of ethnic Germans during the late 1700s to early 1900s across Northeastern Europe, the name is also common in countries such as the Czech Republic, Poland, and Lithuania. The name has its origins in an Old German term meaning 'grower of oats'. In Switzerland it is often rendered as Haeberli. It may refer to:

- Brian Haberlin (born 1963), comic book creator
- Eduard Häberlin (1820–1884), Swiss politician
- Friedrich Heinrich Häberlin (1834–1897), Swiss politician, brother of Eduard
- Georg Heinrich Häberlin (1644–1699), German Lutheran theologian
- Heinrich Häberlin (1868–1947), Swiss politician, son of Friedrich Heinrich and nephew of Eduard
- Paul Häberlin (1878–1960), Swiss philosopher
- Carl Haeberlin (1870–1954), sometimes also spelled Häberlin, German physician and natural historian
- Herman Karl Haeberlin (1890–1918), German-American anthropologist
- Paul Haeberlin (1923–2008), French chef
- Carl von Häberlin (1832–1911), German painter

== See also ==
- Haber
- Häberli
- Heaberlin
- Fred Haberlein (1944–2018), American muralist, painter, and sculptor
