= April 2018 Kabul suicide bombing =

April 2018 Kabul suicide bombing may refer to:

- 22 April 2018 Kabul suicide bombing
- 30 April 2018 Kabul suicide bombings
