= Haberl =

Haberl is a surname. Notable people with the surname include:

- Aladár Háberl (1898–1990), Hungarian skier
- Charles G. Häberl (born 1976), American professor
- Franz Xaver Haberl (1840–1910), German musicologist
- Raimund Haberl (born 1949), Austrian rower

== See also ==
- Jim Haberl Hut, an alpine hut located in Tantalus Range near Squamish, British Columbia
- Häberli
