= Brändli =

Brändli or Braendli is a surname. Notable people with the surname include:

- Andrea Brändli (born 1997), Swiss ice hockey player
- Christoffel Brändli (born 1943), Swiss politician
- Heinrich Brändli (1938–2018), Swiss engineer and professor
- Paul Braendli, Swiss intellectual property administrator
