= Velga =

Female given name

- Gender: Female
- Name day: August 13

Origin
- Meaning: From veldzēt (“to refresh")
- Region of origin: Latvia

Velga is a Latvian feminine given name. Its name day is August 13.

== Notable people named Velga ==
- Velga Krile (1945–1991), Latvian poet
- Velga Vīlipa (1940–2018), Latvian actress
