= Bob Byler =

American jazz journalist, archivist and professor

Robert Harris Byler Jr.
- Born: June 28, 1930; Sycamore, Illinois U.S.
- Died: April 28, 2018 (aged 87); Venice, Florida, U.S.
- Occupations: jazz journalist, archivist and journalism professor

Bob Byler (June 28, 1930 – April 28, 2018) was a journalism professor and jazz journalist and archivist, known primarily for his long association as a writer and contributing editor for The Mississippi Rag and his extensive documentation of jazz performances taken with his wife Ruth Byler. Byler was a longtime professor at Bowling Green State University.

== Biography ==
Born on June 28, 1930, in Sycamore, Illinois, Robert Harris Byler Jr. became enamored with jazz at age 12 while listening to radio broadcasts of Stan Kenton.

Byler attended Illinois Wesleyan University and was awarded a bachelor’s degree in journalism in 1952 and went on to complete a master’s degree at the University of Missouri School of Journalism in 1954. During his studies in both Bloomington, Indiana, and Columbia, Missouri, Byler worked as a reporter, photographer and classified ad salesman for daily newspapers.

After graduating with his master’s, Byler served in the United States Army Signal Corps as a motion picture photographer for nearly two years.

In 1965, Byler relocated to Evansville, Indiana, where he worked as a public information officer at Mead Johnson and continued his work with daily newspapers as a photographer and reporter. During this time, Byler also founded Evansville Indiana Area Jazz Club, which produced four jazz festivals and several performances for the public.

In 1968, Byler was named head of the journalism department at the University of Evansville. Byler left UE in 1973 after being recruited by the journalism department at Bowling Green State University. Byler ultimately earned his PhD in speech communication at BGSU and was subsequently tenured in 1982. He was a professor of journalism until he retired in 1990.

Byler also began writing for The Mississippi Rag in 1973, writing primarily about Dixieland jazz and other traditional jazz styles. By the time the publication ran its last issue in 2008, his output for the publication amounted to thousands of photographs and over 300 articles.

In the late 1980s, Byler and his wife Ruth began videographing and photographing jazz performances around the world. Through hundreds of hours of film, the Bylers documented rare performances, including footage of prolific rhythm guitarist and banjoist Danny Barker shortly before his death.

Two years after his wife Ruth died, Byler began publicly sharing the extensive footage on his Youtube channel, Bob and Ruth Byler Archival Jazz Videos. In addition to Youtube, some of his archives are housed at the Selby Public Library’s Sarasota Music Archive, Bowling Green State University Center for Archival Collections and the Marr Sound Archives at the University of Missouri–Kansas City.

Byler died in hospice care in his home in Venice, Florida, on April 28, 2018, of cancer.
