= Foster Diebold =

American academic (1932–2018)

Foster F. Diebold

President of the University of Alaska System
- In office 1977–1979
- Preceded by: Neil D. Humphrey
- Succeeded by: Jay Barton

President of Edinboro University of Pennsylvania
- In office 1979–1996
- Preceded by: Chester McNerney
- Succeeded by: Frank G. Pogue

Personal details
- Born: October 24, 1932 Orange, New Jersey, U.S.
- Died: April 1, 2018 (aged 85) Miami, Florida
- Spouse: Patricia Diebold
- Education: Monmouth University; Seton Hall University; Rutgers University

Foster F. Diebold (October 24, 1932 – April 1, 2018) was an American academic. He was the President of the University of Alaska System (1977–79) and Edinboro University of Pennsylvania (1979–96).

During his tenure, Edinboro State College was renamed Edinboro University of Pennsylvania through the creation of the State System of Higher Education in Pennsylvania via Act 188 of 1983. The Diebold Center for the Performing Arts at Edinboro University was named in his honor in 1992, and he was inducted into the Edinboro University Athletics Hall of Fame in 2006. He was an alumnus of Monmouth University, Seton Hall University, and Rutgers University (Doctor of Education, Labor Studies and Collective Bargaining).
