= Yahya Modarresi =

Iranian linguist

Yahya Modarresi Tehrani
- Born: 1945; Tehran
- Education: University of Kansas (PhD)
- Scientific career
- Fields: linguistics
- Institutions: Institute for Humanities and Cultural Studies (I.H.C.S.)
- Thesis: A Sociolinguistic Analysis of Modern Persian (1978)
- Doctoral advisor: James W. Hartman
- Other academic advisors: David A. Dinnen; Michael M. T. Henderson

Yahya Modarresi Tehrani (Persian: یحیی مدرسی تهرانی; born 1945) is an Iranian linguist and Professor of Linguistics at the Institute for Humanities and Cultural Studies (I.H.C.S.), Tehran, Iran. He is best known for his works on sociolinguistics. He won the Iranian Book of the Year Award for his book An Introduction to Sociolinguistics.

== Books ==
- An Introduction to Sociolinguistics, Tehran: IHCS 1989
- Language and Migration (2015)
