= Heaberlin =

Heaberlin is a surname, an Americanized variant of the Swiss surname Häberlin. Notable people with the surname include:

- Bryane Heaberlin (born 1993), American soccer player
- Stanley Heaberlin (1908–1989), American politician
- Brian Heaberlin, (born 1963) American comic book artist

== See also ==
- Häberlin, a surname, the original Swiss form
