= André Sterling =

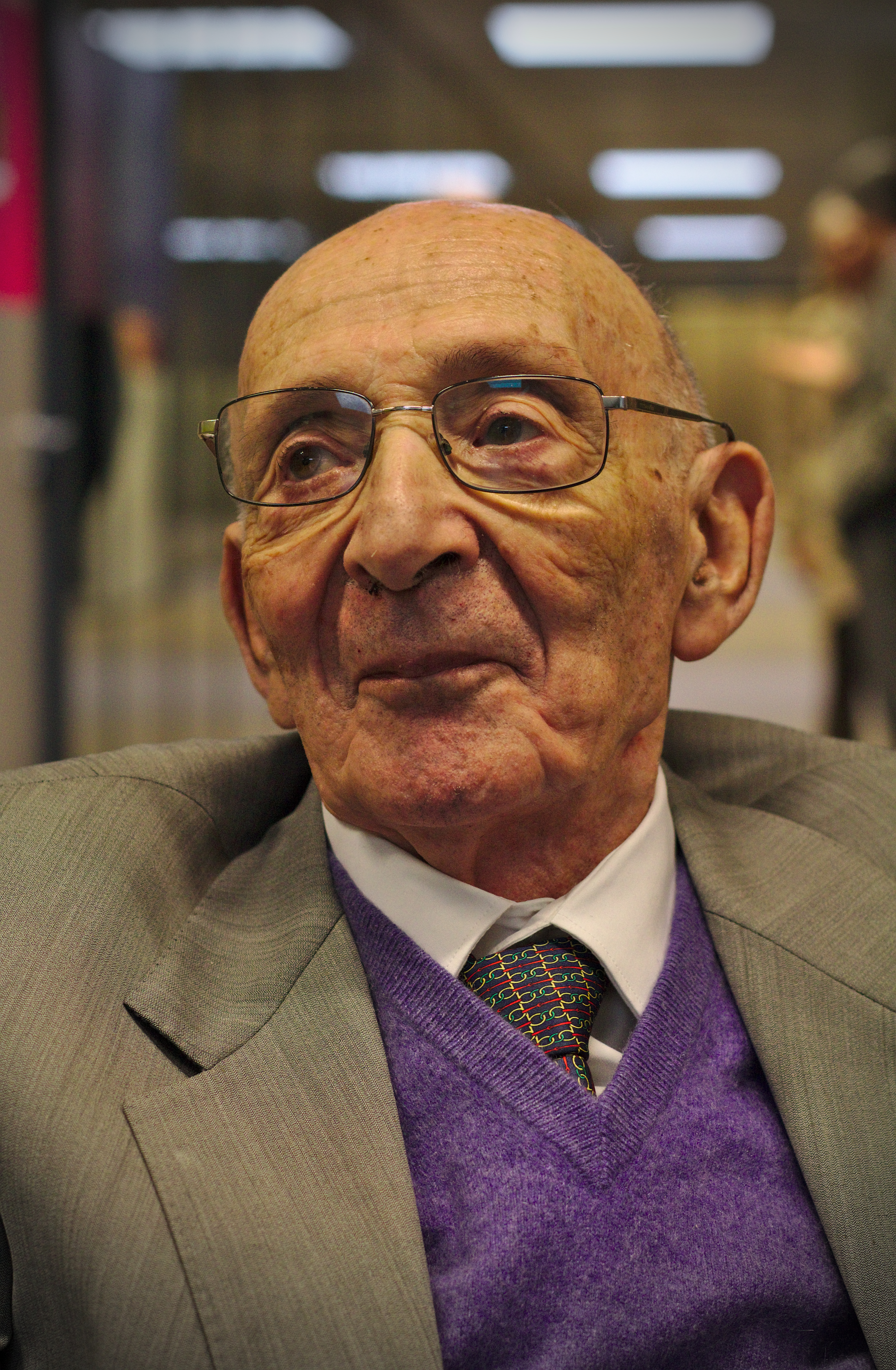
A. Sterling in December 2015

André Sterling (March 30, 1924 – April 14, 2018) was a Belgian civil engineer, professor emeritus at the Université libre de Bruxelles and academician of the Belgian Royal Academy for Overseas Sciences, the last Belgian federal academy.

== Career ==
Sterling was lead engineer during the works that have succeeded the floodings of 1953 (that were responsible for hundreds of death in the Netherlands and about 60 deaths in Belgium). He became director of the Belgian state hydraulic laboratory (once in Borgerhout, Belgium) and was the founder of the Walloon hydraulic laboratory and secretary general of the Ministry of public works.

His entire work is being digitized and will be put online under a CC BY-SA licence compatible with Wikipedia in a Digithèque (much as Digithèque Pierre Gilbert) that will be inaugurated in Brussels on 5 December 2015.

He was a member of the Belgian Royal Academy for Overseas Sciences (ARSOM). and later became director of this Academy.

Sterling died on April 14, 2018.
