= Viliam Karmažin =

Slovak composer and conductor

- Born: September 23, 1922; Leopoldov
- Died: April 10, 2018 (aged 95); Sereď
- Occupation(s): Composer; Conductor

Viliam Karmažin (September 23, 1922 – April 10, 2018) was a Slovak composer and conductor. He was the longest-serving conductor in the world.
