= Morag Crichton Timbury =

Scottish biologist, bacteriologist and virologist

Morag Crichton Timbury FRCPG FRCPath FRSE FRCP
- Born: Morag Crichton McCulloch; 29 September 1930
- Died: 28 April 2018 (aged 87); Edinburgh
- Education: University of Glasgow
- Medical career
- Field: virology, bacteriology
- Institutions: Ruchill Hospital; University of Glasgow; Glasgow Royal Infirmary; Public Health Laboratory Service

Morag Crichton Timbury (née McCulloch; 29 September 1930 – 28 April 2018) was a Scottish medical virologist, bacteriologist and science writer.

== Early life and education ==
Morag Crichton McCulloch was born on 29 September 1930. Her parents were Dr Esther Sinclair McCulloch (née Hood) and William McCulloch. She attended St Bride's High School in East Kilbride before studying medicine at University of Glasgow. She graduated from the university with a MB ChB in 1953 and MD in 1960, and received her PhD in 1976.

== Career ==
After graduation, she worked from 1960 to 1963 at the Regional Virtus Laboratory, in Ruchill Hospital, Glasgow as the Sir Maurice Bloch Research Fellow in Virology. She was a lecturer (1963–1965) and senior lecturer (1965–1976) in bacteriology at the University of Glasgow, and subsequently a Reader in virology (1976–78). She went on to become Professor of Bacteriology and William Teacher Lecturer (1978–88) at the university, and head of the Department of Bacteriology at Glasgow Royal Infirmary. In 1988, Timbury was appointed director of the Central Public Health Laboratory of the Public Health Laboratory Service, and she held that position until 1995.

She was a visiting associate professor at Baylor College of Medicine in Houston, Texas, United States (1975), visiting Mayne Guest Professor at the University of Queensland, Brisbane, Australia (1990) and Honorary Visiting Professor of Virology at Imperial College School of Medicine (1997–99).

In 1998, Timbury was a committee member on the Independent Review Group for the Review of Food-related Scientific Services in Scotland. The resulting report of the Group, The Timbury Report, was named for her.

== Selected works ==
She has authored or co-authored many articles and books including the following:

- Notes on Medical Microbiology by Morag C. Timbury, A. Christine McCartney, Bishan Thakker, and Katherine N. Ward (authors); August 2002 (ISBN 0443071640)
- Medical Virology, February 1991 (ISBN 0-443-04148-2)
- Notes on Medical Bacteriology (co-author: J. Douglas Sleigh) January 1981 (ISBN 0-443-02264-X) January 1986 (ISBN 0-04-430332-7)
- Essentials of Immunology and Microbiology (co-author: Robert G. White) January 1973 (ISBN 0-273-00171-X/ISBN 0-397-58127-0)

== Awards and honours ==
- Fellow of the Royal College of Physicians and Surgeons of Glasgow, 1974
- Fellow of the Royal College of Pathologists, 1976
- Fellow of the Royal Society of Edinburgh, 1979
- Fellow of the Royal College of Physicians, 1994

== Personal life ==
She was married to Professor Gerald Charles Timbury (d.1985), Dean of post-graduate medicine at the University of Glasgow, consultant psychiatrist, and Physician Superintendent at Gartnavel Royal Hospital, Glasgow from 1965 to 1980. Together they had one daughter, Judith. Timbury died in Edinburgh on 28 April 2018.
