= Bob Gessner =

American artist

I always say my designs have won two World Series, two Stanley Cups and a national championship.

— Bob Gessner,

Robert Gessner (1933 – April 27, 2018) was an American freelance artist, from Pittsburgh, Pennsylvania, who created many of the logos for the city's athletic teams. In addition to producing logos, Gessner also provided the artwork for the local teams' programs. After studying at the Art Institute of Pittsburgh, Duquesne University and the University of Pittsburgh, Gessner fought in the Korean War with the U.S. Army before returning to Pittsburgh to begin his freelance artist career. He is credited for providing logos to the Pittsburgh Penguins, Pittsburgh Pirates, Pittsburgh Hornets and the Pitt Panthers.

== Logo work ==
=== University of Pittsburgh ===
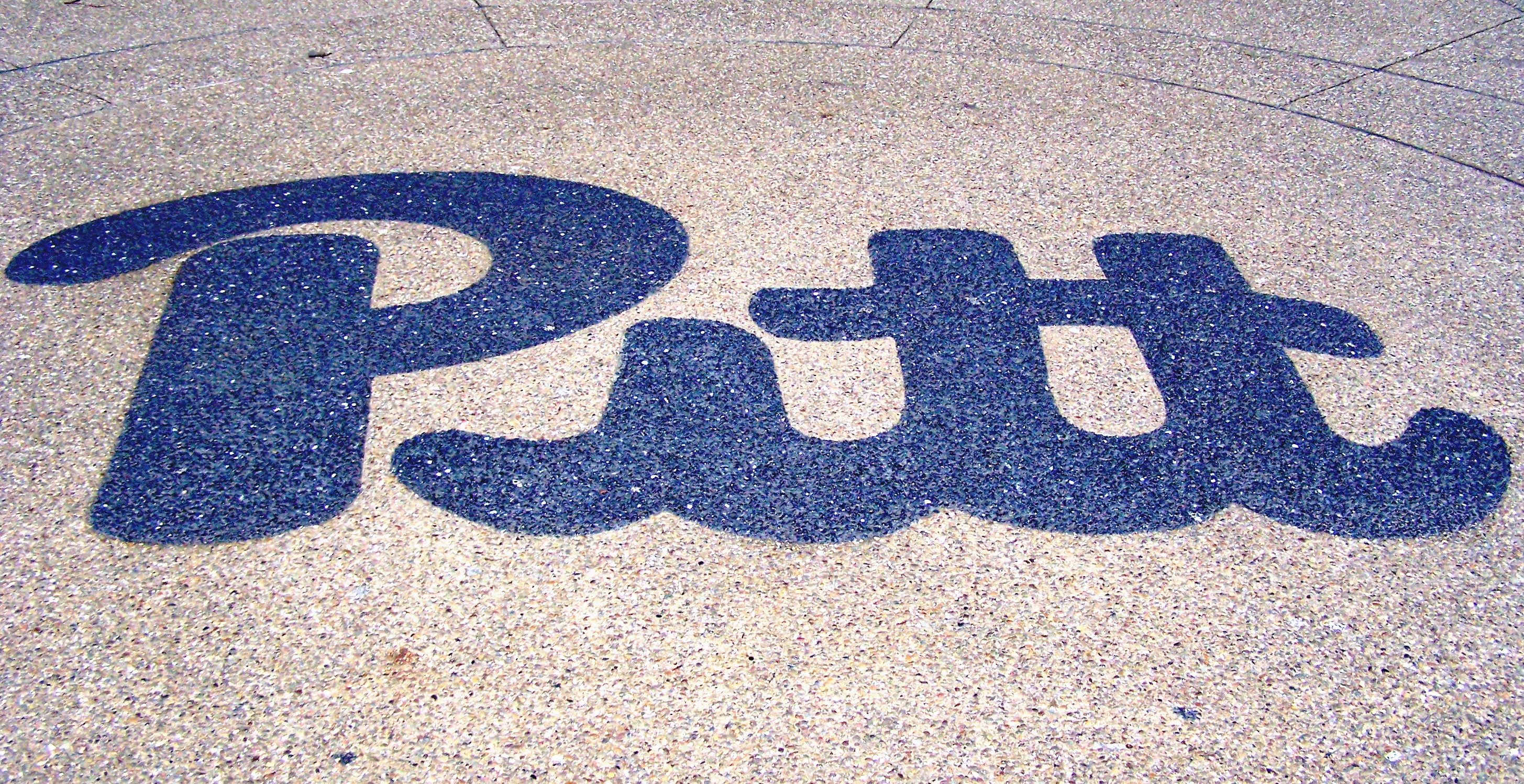
The "Pitt Script" logo designed by Gessner, seen here embedded in the plaza outside of the William Pitt Union, served as the primary logo from 1973 until 1997 and again from 2019 to present is a popular trademark

He designed the University of Pittsburgh's script "Pitt" logo first used on their football helmets in 1973. Pitt's script logos became the most dominant logo for the university and athletic teams starting with its adoption onto the football helmets of the university in 1973. While earning his degree at Pitt, Gessner became friends with Beano Cook, the University's sports information director. Cook gave Gessner some freelance illustration jobs for athletic programs, newspapers and other Panthers' publications. Gessner's "Pitt" script logo is actually a stylized version of the signature of William Pitt, the British Secretary of State during the French and Indian War, and later Prime Minister, for whom Fort Pitt and later Pittsburgh were named.

=== Pittsburgh Hornets ===
In 1961, Beano Cook helped Gessner get the job for creating the new logo for the Pittsburgh Hornets of the American Hockey League. He was hired to make the Hornets logo look tougher, since the team suspended operations from 1955-1960. In addition, he also did all of the artwork for the team's programs. Gessner work with the Hornets carried over to him getting the logo job for the expansion Pittsburgh Penguins in 1967.

=== Pittsburgh Penguins ===
In 1967 Gessner created the first logo for the Pittsburgh Penguins of the National Hockey League. He was paid $1,500 for providing the Penguins with their logo. The first logo featured a skating penguin with a scarf holding a hockey stick in front of a golden triangle symbolic of the city's Golden Triangle. The team's original colors were to be black and white. However a protest from the Boston Bruins, who claimed that the black and white colors were owned by the Bruins, forced the Penguins to change their colors to Columbia blue, white and navy blue. The logo changed in 1968 to allow for the skating penguin to look meaner. Gessner's "skating penguin" was used until 1992, however it was revived in 2000 and is still the basis of the team's current logo, only with different colors. On September 27, 2010 it was announced that the original scarf-wearing version of the skating penguin will be featured on the Penguins new alternate jersey that the team will debut at the 2011 NHL Winter Classic, to be held at Heinz Field. This marks the first time, the scarf penguin will be featured on a jersey.

=== Pittsburgh Pirates ===
Gessner also drew the "friendly pirate" emblem used by the Pittsburgh Pirates of baseball's National League from 1968 until 1987.

== Retirement ==
Gessner retired in 1996 and lived in St. Augustine, Florida until his on April 27, 2018. He suffered a stroke on April 10, 2015, but recovered.
