= Mary Lou Sallee =

American politician

Mary Lou Sallee (May 10, 1930 – April 6, 2018) was an American Republican politician who served in the Missouri House of Representatives.

Born in Seymour, Missouri, she attended Springfield Senior High School, Southwest Missouri State University, Drury College, and the University of Illinois. She previously worked as a teacher and coach for Ava High School in Ava, Missouri.
