= Matthew Stark =

American civil rights activist (1930–2018)

Matthew Stark (January 27, 1930 – April 10, 2018) was a noted civil rights activist in Minneapolis, Minnesota, and Lee County, Florida. Stark was born to a Jewish family in Brooklyn, New York. He graduated from Ohio University in 1951 with a Bachelor of Arts degree in English and a Bachelor of Science degree in education. He graduated from the University of Minnesota in 1959 with a master's degree in Educational Psychology. Stark received his Ph.D. in Educational Administration and Counseling in June, 1963 from Case Western Reserve University. He was dean of students at Moorhead State University 1962–63. He was assistant professor and coordinator of human relations programs at the University of Minnesota, 1963–1970.

== American Civil Liberties Union involvement ==
Stark left the University of Minnesota in 1973 to head the American Civil Liberties Union of Minnesota, then known as the Minnesota Civil Liberties Union (MCLU). Stark was elected president of the MCLU in 1966. Until then, the board of the MCLU had taken an accommodationist position on religion in the schools, but Stark persuaded them in 1967 to take a separationist position. Stark claimed to have been "greatly inspired" by the leading church-state separationist in Minnesota, Samuel Scheiner of the Jewish-Christian Community Relations Council of Minnesota. From then on, he was "the undisputed leader" of the church-state separation movement in the state. In 1980, Stark filed suit against the school district of Bloomington, Minnesota, challenging its practice of having a religious invocation at high school graduation. The suit was dismissed because Stark lacked standing in Bloomington. The debacle highlighted the MCLU's frequent inability to find live plaintiffs for its lawsuits. (Ibid). Stark has often been a critic of organized religion. "I think the Roman Catholic church is the major institution pushing for restrictions on other peoples' civil liberties," he told an interviewer in 1980, "and the Mormon church is second." "One of Stark's trademarks," a journalist noted in 1988, "has been holding MCLU press conferences on Sunday ... to seek maximum coverage." During his time heading the MCLU, Stark was "denounced from pulpits as an agent of the devil and from police headquarters as a stooge for pornographers."

The losing side of the 1967 board election and policy change, among them longtime editor and activist Bernard Casserly, alleged that Stark's "vociferousness and his inability to separate civil liberties from [radical] political sentiment" caused a severe split in the organization and changed its focus from one "committed to civil liberties to one steeped in radical politics, one that endorsed political candidates, came out against the Vietnam War, and supported the impeachment of Richard Nixon." They claim that Stark "orchestrated the 1967 board election so that the MCLU was, in effect, purged of those members opposed to political activism." The organization also lost members over well-publicized national battles of the ACLU, especially its defense of a Nazi march in Skokie, Illinois, in 1977, and a Ku Klux Klan rally in Tupelo, Mississippi. Stark claimed in retrospect that those controversies were good for the organization. "[Skokie] was a great issue," he said in 1980. "It cleansed the ACLU."

In 1985, a rival slate of activists ran for the MCLU board to challenge Stark's leadership, accusing him of "being domineering and manipulative in his treatment of the 36-member MCLU board," which they contended had led to "serious organizational problems," but the slate was defeated. Some board members denied that Stark was a dictator. "Matt is regularly voted down by the board on substantive issues," said Lynn Castner, president of MCLU from 1974 to 1980.

In mid-1987, Stark went to half-time status at the MCLU but resumed his former role as board president and continued to oversee the staff. He only renewed the contracts of one of the four executive directors who served under him during this time. Stark resigned from the MCLU board in 1995. In March 1996, a pro-Stark faction of the board voted in six new board seats, and elected members to fill them for terms as long as six years. However, the national ACLU rejected these bylaw changes as "undemocratic."

== Awards and recognition ==
The University of Minnesota established the Dr. Matthew Stark Civil Rights and Civil Liberties Faculty and Student Award to recognize contributions to civil rights and liberties. It annually presents an award to both a faculty member and a student. The Hennepin County Bar Association awarded Stark its Advancement of Justice award in 1987. In 2008, Stark presided as grand marshal of the Twin Cities Gay Pride Festival and Parade and received the Pride award from Twin Cities Pride. He won the medal of merit from the Ohio University Alumni Association in 2011.

== Personal life ==
Stark married Terri Stark in 1985. They have no children. Stark wintered in Florida, where he continued to be active in the ACLU chapter in Lee County and in the local Gay Social Network and serves on the ACLU national advisory council. He died on April 10, 2018, at the age of 88.

== Bibliography ==
- Berg, Steve (January 18, 1980). "Matthew Stark: Champion of civil rights – or plain troublemaker?". Minneapolis Tribune. p. 1C.
