= Juozas Karvelis =

Lithuanian politician

Juozas Karvelis (18 April 1934 – 12 April 2018) was a Lithuanian politician. In 1990 he was among those who signed the Act of the Re-Establishment of the State of Lithuania.

== Biography ==
After attending school in Inkakliai from 1942 to 1944 and then in Švėkšna, near Šilutė, in 1949–50, he studied at the Lithuanian Maritime Academy in Klaipėda from 1950 to 1952. He continued his studies at the Naval College of Murmansk, where he graduated in 1954. Karvelis studied at the University of Vilnius in 1960–63. He worked in Murmansk in 1954–58, and then in Klaipėda since 1959. He was Second Assistant to the Head of the Lithuanian Maritime Transport and Captain. He worked as a maritime captain at the trade port in Klaipėda in 1986–90.

A member of Sąjūdis, Karvelis became a member of the Fifth Seimas in 1990, being also a member of the Economic Committee. He did not seek re-election after 1992.

== Family ==
Karvelis was married to Janina (b. 1934) and had three children.
