= Häberli =

Haeberli
Origin
- Region of origin: Switzerland

Other names
- Variant form: Häberlin

Haeberli (or Häberli) is a surname of Swiss origin. Notable people with the surname include:

- Brigitte Häberli-Koller (born 1958), Swiss politician
- Paul Haeberli, American computer graphics researcher
- Thomas Häberli (born 1974), Swiss football manager and player
- Willy Haeberli (1925–2021), Swiss-American physicist
