= Theo Ramos =

Spanish portrait painter

Theodore Sanchez de Pina Ramos (17 October 1928 - 11 April 2018) was a Spanish portrait painter who became a naturalised British subject and painted Queen Elizabeth the Queen Mother, Queen Elizabeth II, and the Duke of Edinburgh.
