= Team chasing =

Team chasing is a British equestrian sport, contested between teams of four riders over a cross-country course of about two miles, with about 25 fences to be jumped. It is a dangerous sport, and a number of injuries have occurred. The teams set off at intervals and race against the clock, the time of the third member of each team being taken as the time of the team.

== History ==
Team chasing was invented by Douglas Bunn (the Master of Hickstead) in 1974 as a spectator sport for television, and has had a small but enthusiastic following ever since. Teams, many of whom have been in existence for some time, have been creative in finding names, such as the Boring Gorings (one of the first teams to compete, in 1974, and the oldest team still chasing), the Cunning Stunts, the Ankle Biting Butt Munchers, the Marston Misfits (founded in 1980), and many others. The sport has enjoyed a revival in the 21st Century, and has recently come to public attention by featuring in the BBC Radio series The Archers.
