= Domenico Pittella =

Italian politician (1932–2018)

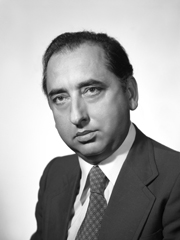
- Pittella in 1976

President of the Hygiene and Health Commission of the Senate of the Republic
- In office 2 July 1980 – 11 July 1983
- Preceded by: Biagio Pinto
- Succeeded by: Adriano Bompiani

Member of the Senate of the Republic
- In office 25 May 1972 – 11 July 1983
- Constituency: Basilicata (Lagonegro)

Personal details
- Born: Domenico Pittella; 7 February 1932 Lauria, Italy
- Died: 15 April 2018 (aged 86) Lauria, Italy
- Party: Italian Socialist Party
- Spouse: Laurita
- Children: Gianni; Marcello
- Education: University of Naples Federico II
- Occupation: Politician, surgeon

Domenico Pittella (7 February 1932 – 15 April 2018) was an Italian politician who was a member of the Senate of the Republic from 1972 to 1983. A member of the Italian Socialist Party, Pittella began his career in the late 1960s and 1970s, emerging as one of the most popular members of the Regional Council of Basilicata. As a member of Basilicata's regional council, he was successfully elected to the Senate of the Republic.

In addition to politics, Pittella was a trained surgeon, which costed him a conviction when he treated Natalia Ligas, a fugitive member of the Red Brigades. As a result of the Ligas affair, he was expelled from the party and subsequently joined and founded various minor parties to establish a Southern League inspired by the Northern League. Before the final sentence in 1993, Pittella fled to France and Belgium. In 1999, he returned to Italy to complete his sentence, which was further reduced by a partial pardon and officially ended in 2000. His two sons Gianni and Marcello Pittella are also politicians. Referred to as the Pittellas, they are considered a political dynasty in the Basilicata region.

== Early life and career ==
Pittella was born on 7 February 1932 in Lauria, a small town of the Southern Italian region Basilicata. He was the son of pharmacist Giovanni Pittella and an elementary school teacher from San Chirico Raparo. He was the second child and only son of four children. Due to his lively character, Pittella soon abandoned the Jesuit college in Naples and returned to Lauria, where he completed his elementary studies and prepared himself privately for middle school. In 1945, he obtained his diploma in Salerno. He continued his studies at the high school of Castrovillari and began working as a nurse in a practice in Lauria after his graduation. In 1956, he graduated in medicine and surgery at the University of Naples Federico II.

== Political career ==
Pittella was a member of the Italian Socialist Party. He approached politics in 1968, when he supported some municipal councilors of the Italian Communist Party who were elected. He made himself well-liked in local political circles and ran for office in the 1970 Basilicata regional election, from which he emerged as councillor with broad consensus (5,300 votes in his municipality alone). In the 1972 Italian general election, he ran for the Senate of the Republic with the Italian Socialist Party. In the Lagonegro constituency, he obtained 26.4% of the votes, behind Bonaventura Picardi of Christian Democracy who garnered 46.2%; both were elected senators. At the end of the electoral campaign, on the holiday of 1 May 1972 and in the presence of the then Italian Socialist deputy Luigi Bertoldi, future Minister of Labor and Social Security, Pittella inaugurated the first part of his hospital with a capacity of seventy beds.

In the Lauria constituency at the 1976 Italian general election, Pittella received 25.0% of the votes, this time coming third, once again behind Bonaventura Picardi (41.0%), as well as Luigi Grezzi of the Italian Communist Party (26.5%); by a technicality, he was the only one of the three to be elected. He was re-elected a third time in the 1979 Italian general election, when he got 28.0% of the votes against 40.6% for Anzilotta, who was not elected. Pittella involvement in the Ligas affair received wide coverage in the national press precisely at the start of the electoral campaign for the 1983 Italian general election. According to subsequent declarations by Pittella, this was intended to favour the rise of the then Italian Socialist Party secretary Bettino Craxi as the prime minister of Italy.

In 1984, it was decided to expel Pittella from the party. While awaiting the final ruling of Italy's Supreme Court of Cassation and after his expulsion from the Southern League, of which he had been honorary president, he decided to create a new party and his own movement. On 7 May 1991, he formed in Rome the Italian League, together with other associates, among them the former Propaganda Due member and retired prefect Bruno Rozzera, the former Italian Social Movement member Alfredo Esposito, the publicist journalist Enrico Viciconte, and the head of the Propaganda Due Masonic lodge Licio Gelli. In the 1992 Italian general election, Pittella ran for both the Senate of the Republic in the Lagonegro constituency, where he obtained 12.6% of the votes, and for the Chamber of Deputies in the Potenza–Matera constituency, where he garnered 4,881 votes, not enough to be elected. For the election, Pittella's Italian League had formed a coalition with other parties and movements, including the Southern Front and the National Popular League of Stefano Delle Chiaie and Tomaso Staiti di Cuddia delle Chiuse, and formed an electoral list called the League of Leagues, close to the right-wing circles of the Italian Social Movement, inspired by the Northern League led by Umberto Bossi.

== Personal life and Ligas affair ==
In 1957, aged 25, Pittella married Laurita. Together, they had two children, who were born in 1958 and 1962. His younger son Marcello Pittella went on to become president of Basilicata from 2013 to 2018, while his eldest son Gianni Pittella held the positions of deputy, senator, and member of the European Parliament, and are considered a significant political dynasty in the Italian region of Basilicata.

In the Ligas affair, Pittella was accused of subversive association and participation in an armed gang for having made Sanatrix, his clinic in Lauria, available to the Red Brigades. In 1981, he treated the fugitive terrorist Natalia Ligas without drawing up a report. Ligas had been wounded in the thigh in a firefight three weeks earlier (19 June 1981), during which some members of the Red Brigades had made an unsuccessful attempt on the life of Antonio De Vita, defense lawyer of the repentant terrorist Patrizio Peci, who defended himself by shooting his gun. Furthermore, Pittella was accused of having developed a plan with the Red Brigades to kidnap for extortion purposes Ferdinando Schettini, the vice-president of Basilicata and his political rival within the Italian Socialist Party, who as the region's health councilor had revoked the agreement with Pittella's clinic.

Pittella was arrested on 4 October 1983 and served the first two years and nine months of detention between his home and the Regina Coeli prison, after which he got paroled. Meanwhile, his private nursing home was put up for sale to the Basilicata region. The appeal trial between 1989 and 1990 confirmed the sentence of twelve years and one month in prison, of which almost three had already been served and another two had been pardoned. At the final sentence, handed down in the Moro Third trial of the Supreme Court of Cassation on 10 May 1993, Pittella made himself untraceable by fleeing to France. Based on what was told by Pittella himself, Ligas was in prison in Messina when she made a written statement to Carlo Taormina, lawyer of the partner of Ligas, in which she asserted that Pittella had never been part of the Red Brigades and that the contact with him, unaware of her real identity, had occurred only in the circumstance of the rescue; she thanked Pittella for his intervention, which saved her life.

After almost six years of being on the run in France (in the cities of Paris, Nice, and Cagnes-sur-Mer) and in Belgium, Pittella decided to turn himself in on 28 April 1999 at the Rebibbia prison. The debt with the Italian justice system, then reduced by a third due to a partial pardon granted on 18 November 1999 by Carlo Azeglio Ciampi, the then president of the Italian Republic, and already partially paid (approximately five years), was extinguished through entrustment to social services in 2000. Pittella fell and broke his hip on 14 February 2018. He died in Lauria on 15 April 2018, aged 86, of complications from the injury.
