= Velga Vīlipa =

Latvian actress (1940–2018)

Velga Vīlipa (4 February 1940 – 2 April 2018) was a Latvian film and theatre actress.

She was best known for her roles in the films Nauris and Šķēps un roze. She also performed at the acclaimed Dailes Theatre and the Youth Theatre.

== Family ==
The daughter of actress Elvīra Bramberga and poet Pāvils Vīlips, she had two sons, Tils and Kristaps, with her husband, actor Edgars Liepiņš.
