= Per K. Enge =

Norwegian-American engineer (1953–2018)

Per Kristian Enge (29 October 1953 – 22 April 2018) was a Norwegian-American engineer.

He earned a master's degree and doctorate in engineering from the University of Illinois. Enge then began teaching at Worcester Polytechnic Institute before joining the Stanford GPS Lab. He taught at Stanford as the Kleiner, Perkins, Caufield & Byers and Sequoia Capital Professor of Engineering, and later assumed the Vance D. and Arlene C. Coffman Professorship. Enge was named a fellow of the IEEE. The National Academy of Engineering granted Enge membership in 2005 "for leadership in the development of augmentations to marine and aviation global positioning systems that have become worldwide standards." He resided in Mountain View, California, where he died on 22 April 2018, aged 64.
