= Daniel Endres =

German footballer

Personal information
- Date of birth: 16 May 1985 (age 41)
- Place of birth: Offenbach am Main, West Germany
- Height: 1.84 m (6 ft 1/2 in)
- Position: Goalkeeper

Team information
- Current team: Bayern Alzenau
- Number: 16

Youth career
- –1995: Eintracht Frankfurt
- 1995–2005: Kickers Offenbach

Senior career*
Years	Team	Apps	(Gls)
2005–2010	Kickers Offenbach	17	(0)
2008–2012	Kickers Offenbach II	24	(0)
2011–2019	Kickers Offenbach	188	(0)
2019–2020	Bayern Alzenau	20	(0)
2020–2022	FSV Frankfurt	67	(0)
2022–	Bayern Alzenau	18	(0)
- * Club domestic league appearances and goals as of 12 November 2022

Daniel Endres (born 16 May 1985) is a German footballer who plays for Bayern Alzenau.

== Career ==
On 17 June 2019 FC Bayern Alzenau confirmed that they had signed Endres.
