= Nauris =

Male given name

- Gender: Male
- Language: Latvian
- Name day: 13 April

Origin
- Region of origin: Latvia

Nauris is a Latvian masculine given name.

People bearing the name Nauris include:

- Nauris Bulvītis (born 1987), Latvian footballer
- Nauris Miezis (born 1991), Latvian basketball player
- Nauris Petkevičius (born 2000), Lithuanian footballer
- Nauris Puntulis (born 1961), Latvian politician
- Nauris Sējējs (born 2001), Latvian ice hockey player
- Nauris Skraustiņš (born 1978), Latvian luger
