= Georg Heinrich Häberlin =

German theologian (1644–1699)

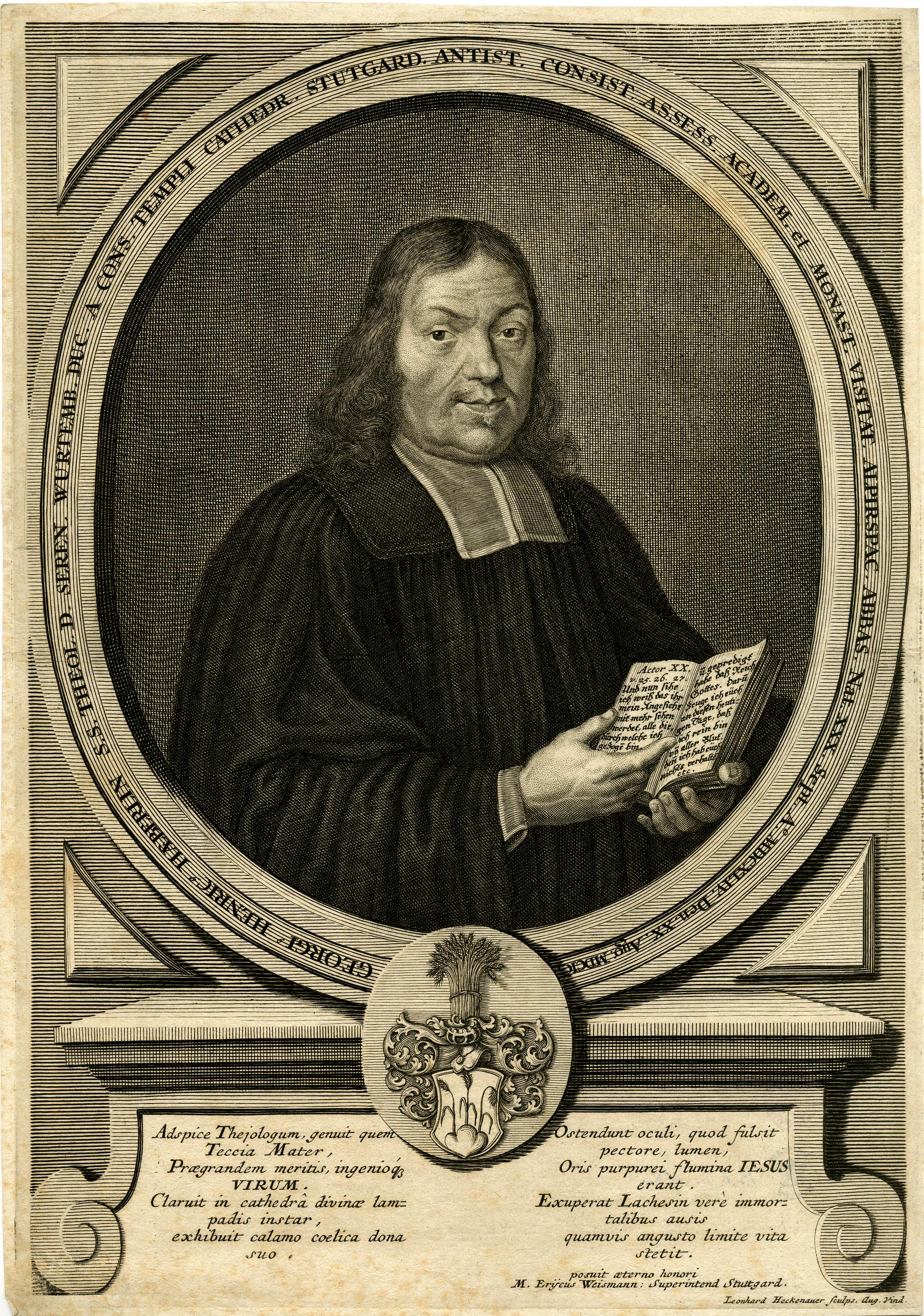
Copper engraving by Leonhard Heckenauer, c. 1699–1704

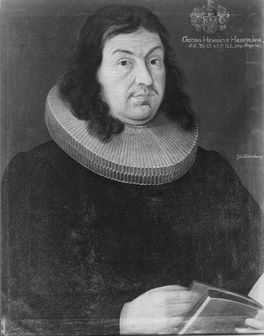
Portrait in Tübingen University

Georg Heinrich Häberlin (1644–1699) was a Lutheran theologian of Germany.

== Life ==
Georg Heinrich Häberlin was born at Stuttgart on 30 September 1644. He studied at Tübingen, became deacon in 1668, doctor and professor of theology in 1681, member of the consistory and preacher in 1692, and died on 20 August 1699.

== Works ==
- Specimen Theologicae Practicae;
- Conspectus Locorum Theologicorum;
- Theologia Corinthiaca in Forma Systematis Proposita;
- De Principio Fidei;
- De Unione Fidelium cum Christo;
- De Justificatione Hominis Coram Deo;
- De Satisfactione Christi;
- De Chiliasmo Hodierno;
- Fidei Christiane Rulina et Infidelitatis Judaicae Firmamento.

== Sources ==
- Pick, B. (1886). "Häberlin, Georg Heinrich". In McClintock, John; Strong, James (eds.). Cyclopædia of Biblical, Theological and Ecclesiastical Literature. Supplement.—Vol. 2. New York: Harper & Brothers. p. 504.
