= Don Hall (footballer) =

Australian rules footballer (1937–2018)

Personal information
- Full name: Donald John Hall
- Born: 7 June 1937; Trafalgar, Victoria
- Died: 23 April 2018 (aged 78); Warrnambool, Victoria
- Original team: Morwell
- Height: 183 cm (6 ft 0 in)
- Weight: 84 kg (185 lb)

Playing career^{1}
Years	Club	Games (Goals)
1958–60	Carlton	10 (4)
- ^{1} Playing statistics correct to the end of 1960.

Donald John Hall (7 June 1937 – 23 April 2018) was an Australian rules footballer who played with Carlton in the Victorian Football League (VFL).
