= Leonard Gilchrist Wilson =

Leonard Gilchrist Wilson (June 11, 1928, in Orillia, Ontario, Canada – April 3, 2018, in Oakdale, Minnesota) was a Canadian-American historian of science, specializing in the history of medicine and biology and the history of nineteenth century geology. He is best known for his 1972 biography of Charles Lyell.

== Biography ==
Leonard G. Wilson grew up in Orillia, Ontario. He graduated in 1949 with a bachelor's degree in biology from the University of Toronto. From 1950 to 1953 he taught as a lecturer at Mount Allison University in Sackville, New Brunswick. In 1955 he graduated with an M.Sc. from the University of London. He received his Ph.D. in 1958 from the University of Wisconsin–Madison. His Ph.D. thesis is entitled Theories of respiration in the seventeenth century. As a postdoc he was from 1958 to 1959 a visiting instructor in the history department of the University of California, Berkeley. From 1959 to 1960 he was an assistant professor in the history department of Cornell University. In the department of history of science and medicine of the Yale University School of Medicine, he was from 1960 to 1965 an assistant professor and 1965 to 1967 an associate professor. In the history of medicine department of the University of Minnesota, Wilson was a full professor and head of the department from 1967 until his retirement in 2001 as professor emeritus. He was the editor-in-chief of the Journal of the History of Medicine and Allied Sciences from 1973 to 1982. His successor as editor-in-chief was Robert J. T. Joy.

Wilson wrote many articles and book reviews about topics in the history of medicine and biology. He was particularly enthusiastic about the history of geology as it developed in the nineteenth century. He made several geological field trips in connection with his historical research. In addition to his internationally recognized works on Charles Lyell, he published on the history of "the species question, Archibald Geikie and the elevation of Scotland, and Lord Kelvin’s estimates of the age of the Earth."

Wilson was for the academic year 1984–1985 the president of the Minnesota Academy of Medicine. He was elected in 1987 a fellow of the American Association for the Advancement of Science. He received the 2013 Mary C. Rabbitt History And Philosophy of Geology Award from the Geological Society of America.

In June 1969 he married Adelia Katherine Hans (1937–2015). George Edward Hans Wilson, their only child, became the father of two children.

== Selected publications ==
=== Articles ===
- Wilson, Leonard G. (1960). "The Transformation of Ancient Concepts of Respiration in the Seventeenth Century". Isis. 51 (2): 161–172. doi:10.1086/348871. PMID 13845097. S2CID 22449269.
- Wilson, L. G. (1963). "Charles Lyell". The Yale Journal of Biology and Medicine. 36 (2): 193–194. PMC 2604524.
- Wilson, Leonard G. (1978). "Fevers and Science in Early Nineteenth Century Medicine". Journal of the History of Medicine and Allied Sciences. 33 (3): 386–407. doi:10.1093/jhmas/XXXIII.3.386. PMID 361813.
- Wilson, Leonard G. (1980). "Geology on the Eve of Charles Lyell's First Visit to America, 1841". Proceedings of the American Philosophical Society. 124 (3): 168–202. JSTOR 986369.
- Wilson, Leonard G. (1987). "The Early recognition of streptococci as causes of disease". Medical History. 31 (4): 403–414. doi:10.1017/S0025727300047268. PMC 1139783. PMID 3316876.
- Wilson, Leonard G. (1990). "The Historical Decline of Tuberculosis in Europe and America: Its Causes and Significance". Journal of the History of Medicine and Allied Sciences. 45 (3): 366–396. doi:10.1093/jhmas/45.3.366. PMID 2212609.
- Wilson, Leonard G. (1992). "The Rise and Fall of Tuberculosis in Minnesota: The Role of Infection". Bulletin of the History of Medicine. 66 (1): 16–52. JSTOR 44452078. PMID 1559028.
- Wilson, Leonard G. (1995). "The Crime of Saving Lives". Archives of Surgery. 130 (10): 1035–1039. doi:10.1001/archsurg.1995.01430100013002. PMID 7575112.
- Wilson, Leonard G. (1996). "Brixham Cave and Sir Charles Lyell's … the Antiquity of Man: The roots of Hugh Falconer's attack on Lyell". Archives of Natural History. 23: 79–97. doi:10.3366/anh.1996.23.1.79.
- Wilson, Leonard G. (2002). "A scientific libel: John Lubbock's attack upon Sir Charles Lyell". Archives of Natural History. 29: 73–87. doi:10.3366/anh.2002.29.1.73.
- Wilson, Leonard G. (2005). "Commentary: Medicine, population, and tuberculosis". International Journal of Epidemiology. 34 (3): 521–524. doi:10.1093/ije/dyh196. PMID 15465901.
- Wilson, L. G. (2007). "The geological travels of Sir Charles Lyell in Madeira and the Canary Islands, 1853–1854". Geological Society, London, Special Publications. 287 (1): 207–228. Bibcode:2007GSLSP.287..207W. doi:10.1144/sp287.17. S2CID 129581992.

=== Books ===
- Selected readings in the history of physiology, compiled by John Farquhar Fulton (1899–1960); completed by Leonard G. Wilson. Springfield, Illinois: C.C. Thomas. 1966. ASIN B000GHIZH2. LCCN 64024043.
- Wilson, Leonard G., ed. (1970). Sir Charles Lyell's scientific journals on the species question. New Haven: Yale University Press. ISBN 978-0-300-01231-6.
- Wilson, Leonard G. (1972). Charles Lyell, the years to 1841: the revolution in geology. New Haven: Yale University Press. ISBN 0300014864. LCCN 72075212; xiii+553 pages
- Wilson, Leonard G., ed. (1979). Benjamin Silliman and his circle: studies on the influence of Benjamin Silliman on science in America : prepared in honor of Elizabeth H. Thomson. New York: Science History Publications. ISBN 0882021745. LCCN 77021564.
- Wilson, Leonard G., ed. (1981). Madeline E. Stanton (WorldCat database entry). New Haven, Connecticut: Journal of the History of Medicine and Allied Sciences. ASIN B001G0WA4M.
- Wilson, Leonard G. (1989). Medical revolution in Minnesota: a history of the University of Minnesota Medical School. St. Paul, Minnesota: Midewiwin Press. pp. xi+612 pages. ISBN 0962088404. LCCN 88029563.
- Wilson, Leonard G. (1998). Lyell in America: transatlantic geology, 1841-1853. Baltimore: Johns Hopkins University Press. ISBN 080185797X. LCCN 98010319; xii+429 pages
- Wilson, Leonard G. (2012). Minnesota Academy of Medicine, 1887-2012: the story of the first one hundred twenty-five years (WorldCat database entry). Minnesota Academy of Medicine.
