= Joan Staniswalis =

American statistician (1957–2018)

Joan Georgette Staniswalis (July 25, 1957 – April 13, 2018) was an American statistician. She made significant contributions to the theory and biomedical applications of statistics, including the effects of air quality and racial inequality on health.

== Education and career ==
Staniswalis was born in Fort Lewis, Washington. Her father was in the U.S. Army, and she lived in Panama City, Panama during his periods of service.

She attended California State University, Fullerton beginning in 1975, and graduated in 1979 with high honors in mathematics and a minor in physics. She completed her Ph.D. in 1985 at the University of California, San Diego. Her dissertation, Local Bandwidth Selection for Kernel Estimates, was supervised by John A. Rice.

In 1984, she became a lecturer in business statistics at Virginia Commonwealth University (VCU). In the following year, she shifted to the department of biostatistics in VCU's Medical College of Virginia. She moved in 1990 to the University of Texas at El Paso (UTEP), where she was promoted to full professor in 1999. She remained at UTEP for the rest of her career, with the exception of a term in 2001 as visiting professor and interim associate dean at New Mexico State University. She retired to become a professor emeritus in 2016.

At UTEP, she directed the Statistical Consulting Laboratory from 1997 to 2003.

== Recognition ==
Staniswalis was elected as a Fellow of the American Statistical Association in 2001, "for important contributions to nonparametric regression and its application to biomedical research; for collaborative research accomplishments and administrative leadership in consulting; for mentoring of students and junior researchers".

== Selected publications ==
- Carter, Walter H.; Gennings, Chris; Staniswalis, Joan G.; Campbell, Eleanor D.; White, Kimber L. (December 1988), "A statistical approach to the construction and analysis of isobolograms", Journal of the American College of Toxicology, 7 (7): 963–973, doi:10.3109/10915818809014527, S2CID 120607418
- Staniswalis, Joan G. (1989), "The kernel estimate of a regression function in likelihood-based models", Journal of the American Statistical Association, 84 (405): 276–283, doi:10.1080/01621459.1989.10478766, JSTOR 2289874, MR 0999689
- Severini, Thomas A.; Staniswalis, Joan G. (1994), "Quasi-likelihood estimation in semiparametric models", Journal of the American Statistical Association, 89 (426): 501–511, doi:10.1080/01621459.1994.10476774, JSTOR 2290852, MR 1294076
- Staniswalis, Joan G.; Lee, J. Jack (1998), "Nonparametric regression analysis of longitudinal data", Journal of the American Statistical Association, 93 (444): 1403–1418, doi:10.1080/01621459.1998.10473801, JSTOR 2670055, MR 1666636
