= Marr Sound Archives =

Audiovisual archive in Missouri, United States

- Interactive map of Marr Sound Archives
- 39°2′6.1″N 94°34′35.5″W
- Location: 800 E 51st Street, Kansas City, Missouri, United States
- Established: 1987
- Affiliation: Miller Nichols Library
- Website: library.umkc.edu/sca/marr/

The Marr Sound Archives is an audiovisual archive, affiliated with the University of Missouri-Kansas City. The Marr Sound Archives is one of four departments comprising the Special Collections and Archives division housed at the Miller Nichols Library.

The collection includes extensive holdings of jazz, blues, country and popular music; historic voices and authors reading their own works; vintage radio programs; classical and opera. The Marr Sound Archives holds a wide range of historic formats including LPs, 78s, 45s, cylinders, transcription discs, instantaneous-cut discs, compact cassette tapes, and open-reel audiotapes. The archives maintain audiovisual materials for a number of archival collections shared with LaBudde Special Collections and The UMKC University Archives.

The archives were created from a donation of 42,000 items by Olga and Gaylord Marr in 1987. As of 2023, the archives hold over 400,000 recordings.

== Trivia ==
- The Marr Sound Archives was used as a filming location for the Hallmark movie A Grand Ole Opry Christmas.
- The Marr Sound Archives contributed original audio recordings of Charlie Parker to "Bird in Kansas City," from Verve Records.
