= Michael Schlesinger =

Michael Earl Schlesinger
- Born: February 23, 1943; Los Angeles, California, U.S.
- Died: April 11, 2018 (aged 75); Champaign, Illinois, U.S.
- Education: University of California, Los Angeles
- Scientific career
- Fields: Atmospheric science
- Workplaces: University of Illinois
- Thesis: A numerical simulation of the general circulation of atmospheric ozone (1976)

Michael Earl Schlesinger (February 23, 1943 – April 11, 2018) was an American climatologist who was Professor of Atmospheric Sciences and director of the Climate Research Group at the University of Illinois at Urbana-Champaign. He received his Ph.D. (meteorology) in 1976 from the University of California, Los Angeles.

Schlesinger was an expert in the modeling, simulation and analysis of climate and climate change, with interests in simulating and understanding the climates of the geologic past and possible future climates resulting from increased concentrations of greenhouse gases and human-made aerosols.

He was instrumental in developing a range of simple and complex climate models, which have been used by the Intergovernmental Panel on Climate Change and the Energy Modeling Forum. His research focused on: (1) simulating and understanding the effects on climate of a human-induced melting of the Greenland ice sheet; (2) simulating and understanding the coupled climate-chemistry system, including the influences of the Sun – both irradiance and energetic electron precipitation – and volcanoes; (3) understanding and reducing the uncertainty in the estimation of climate sensitivity and climate feedbacks; and (4) performing integrative assessment of climate change, including further development of the robust adaptive decision strategy for mitigating and adapting to human-induced climate change.

He is known for his work on oscillations in the global climate system, on estimating the climate sensitivity, and on seasonal climate change.

He edited four books, most recently Human-induced climate change: An interdisciplinary assessment. He regularly appeared in the media.
