= Michael M. T. Henderson =

American linguist

Michael Magnus Thyne Henderson
- Born: 1942
- Died: April 2, 2018
- Education: University of Wisconsin-Madison (PhD)
- Scientific career
- Fields: linguistics
- Institutions: University of Kansas
- Thesis: Dari (Kabul Persian) Phonology (1972)
- Doctoral advisor: Valdis J. Zeps
- Other academic advisors: John C. Street; Andrew L. Sihler
- Notable students: Yahya Modarresi

Michael Magnus Thyne Henderson (1942 - April 2, 2018) was an American linguist and Professor of Linguistics at the University of Kansas. He is best known for his works on Dari Persian. He was an executive director of the Kabul English Language Center in Afghanistan (1965-1968).
