= Shah Marai =

Afghan journalist and photographer

- Born: February 5, 1977; Kabul, Afghanistan
- Died: 30 April 2018; Kabul, Afghanistan
- Occupation: Journalist

Shah Marai (5 February 1977 - 30 April 2018) was an Afghan journalist and photographer. He was chief photographer for Agence France-Presse's Kabul Bureau from 1996 to his death in 2018. In total, AFP distributed more than 18,000 of his pictures. He was one of the casualties of the suicide bombing in Afghanistan on 30 April 2018. He had a wife and six children.

== Death ==
In a 2016 AFP blog post, Marai described his fear of becoming a victim of a bombing, writing, "Every morning as I go to the office and every evening when I return home, all I think of are cars that can be booby-trapped, or of suicide bombers coming out of a crowd. I can’t take the risk. So we don’t go out."

Marai was amongst 25 killed (including 8 journalists) in the suicide bombings in Kabul on 30 April 2018 carried out by the Islamic State of Iraq and the Levant.

=== Reaction ===
"Our friend, the great photographer Shah Marai, is among the dead of the second Kabul explosion this morning. He was doing his job, like he had over two decades," wrote New York Times correspondent Mujib Mashal. “This is a devastating blow, for the brave staff of our close-knit Kabul bureau and the entire agency,” Agence France-Presse's global news director Michèle Léridon said. “We can only honor the strength, courage, and generosity of a photographer who covered often traumatic, horrific events with sensitivity and consummate professionalism.”
