= Óscar Saavedra San Martín =

Bolivian physicist and academic (1940–2018)

Óscar Saavedra
- Born: 29 June 1940; La Paz, Bolivia
- Died: 8 April 2018 (aged 77); Bonvicino, Italy
- Education: University of Milan
- Known for: Studies on cosmic ray and Astroparticle physics
- Awards: Order of the Condor of the Andes M.A. Markov Prize
- Scientific career
- Fields: Astrophysics and Physics
- Workplaces: University of Turin; Higher University of San Andrés

Óscar Saavedra San Martín (29 June 1940 – 8 April 2018), was a Bolivian physicist and academic. His work focused on cosmic rays and neutrinos, with most of his academic career spent in Italy at the University of Torino.

== Early life ==
He was born in La Paz, Bolivia. He attended Colegio San Calixto as a teenager in La Paz, where he volunteered at the school's astronomical observatory. Upon recommendation from one of his instructors, he began work at the Mount Chacaltaya Laboratory.

== Scientific Career ==
Saavedra received his PhD in Physics from the University of Milan, Italy in 1964, for his thesis developed at the EURATOM (Nuclear Research Center of Europe): "No conservation of parity in strong interactions" (Parity non conservation in Strong Interactions).

After graduate study, Saavedra returned to Bolivia. In 1966, at the age of 25, he became the director of the Chacaltaya Cosmic Physics Laboratory, the youngest in the institution's history. He served in this position until returning to Italy to pursue research opportunities in 1968.

In Italy, his scientific activity focused on the physics of cosmic rays and neutrinos, including international collaborations.

Throughout his career, Saavedra was professor in University of Turin, Higher University of San Andrés, University of Tokyo and University of Kiel. He was awarded professor emeritus status from the University of Turin upon his retirement.

== Awards and recognition ==
For his scientific work, Saavedra received the Order of the Condor of the Andes, the highest distinction awarded by the government of Bolivia.

In 2007, Saavedra and two collaborators were awarded the M.A. Markov Prize by the Institute for Nuclear Research of the Russian Academy of Sciences for "... development of methods, creation of experimental facilities, detection of the neutrino signals from the collapse of massive star SN1987A and for outstanding contribution into the development of basic studies in the field of 'underground neutrino physics.'"
