= Artur Endreß =

German ice hockey player (1932–2025)

Personal information
- Nationality: German
- Born: 6 February 1932
- Died: 22 August 2025 (aged 93)

Sport
- Sport: Ice hockey

Artur Endreß (6 February 1932 – 22 August 2025) was a German ice hockey player. He competed in the men's tournament at the 1956 Winter Olympics.
