= Fred Haberlein =

American painter

Fred F. Haberlein
- Born: December 7, 1944
- Died: April 16, 2018 (aged 73)

Fred F. Haberlein was an American muralist, painter, and sculptor. He grew up at Conejos Ranch, a guest ranch in Conejos County, Colorado. He studied sculpture and printmaking in college, but he was best known for his murals throughout the western United States, predominantly in Colorado. He lived near Glenwood Springs, Colorado and died in 2018.

Haberlein was twice nominated for the Colorado Governor's Award for Excellence in the Arts. He taught art classes at Colorado Mountain College for eighteen years. His first mural was rendered in Oracle, AZ in 1977, and he completed over 130 murals since then. A Native American friend gave him the name "Lightning Heart," which he used professionally. Haberlein completed more single-handed murals than any other U.S. artist.

== List of murals by location ==
=== Colorado ===
==== San Luis Valley ====
===== Alamosa =====
Site	Title/Subject	Dimensions	Notes
U.S. Post Office	The San Luis Valley	4 x 48 ft.	
Crane Building, Main Street	Whooping Cranes and Wetlands	32 x 43 ft.	
Big A Auto Parts Motor Coach Bus	Mt. Blanca Sunrise	3 x 16 ft.	
Big A Auto Parts Motor Coach Bus	Sangre de Cristo Panorama	3 x 16 ft.	
Walsh Motel Bar	Toltec Gorge	6 x 8 ft.	
Valley-Wide Health Services	Sierra Vista	3 x 36 ft.	oil painting
KRZA Radio	Pictorial Logo	8 ft. circle	
Meriwether Photo Van	The High Country	6 x 34 ft.	wrap-around, no longer in existence
Sports Family Haircare	The Latir Lakes	4 x 7 ft.	no longer in existence
Trinidad State Junior College	The Great Thunder Bear	4.5 x 9 ft.	painted sculpture

===== Antonito =====
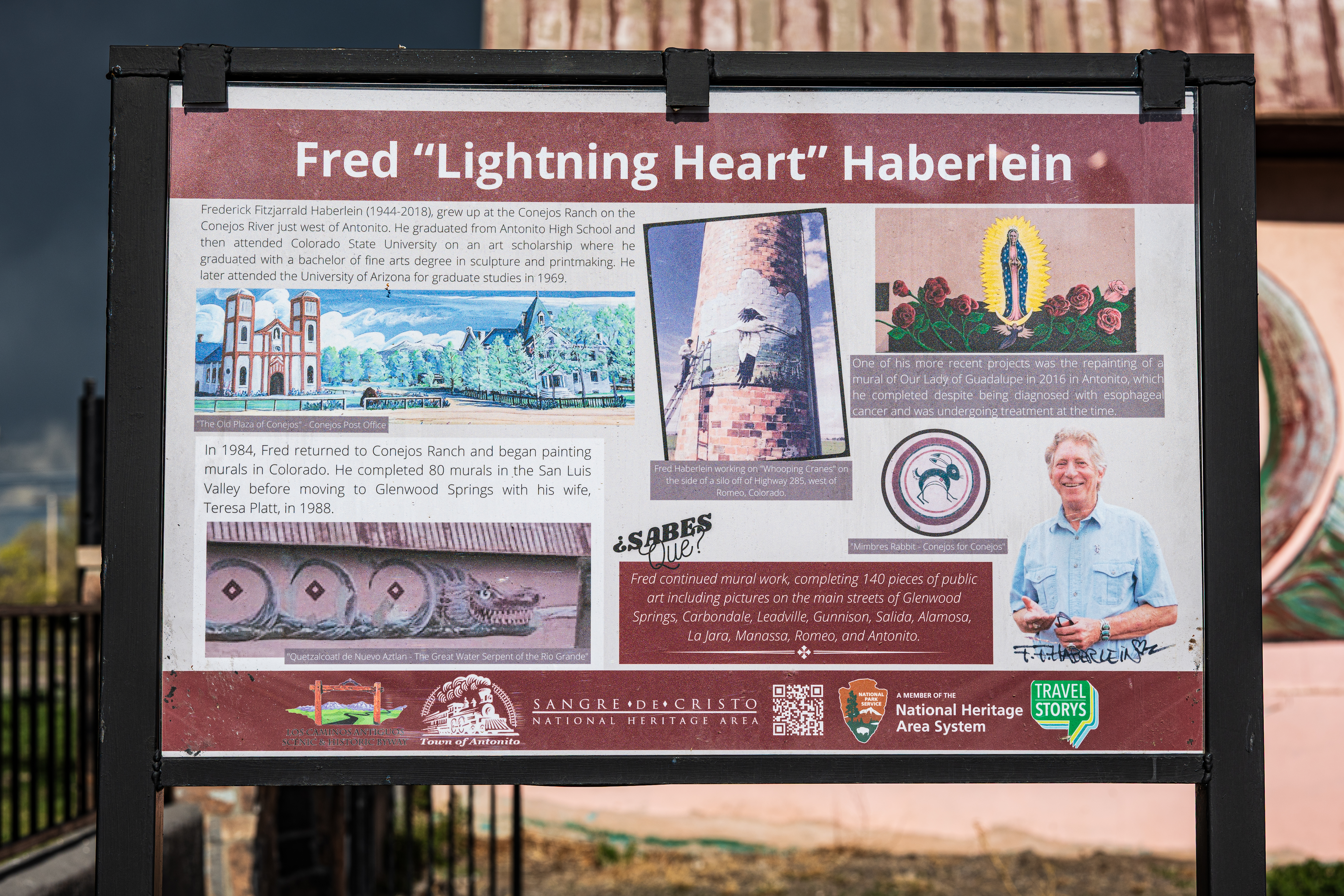
Sign in Antonito, CO summarizing the life and work of Fred Haberlein

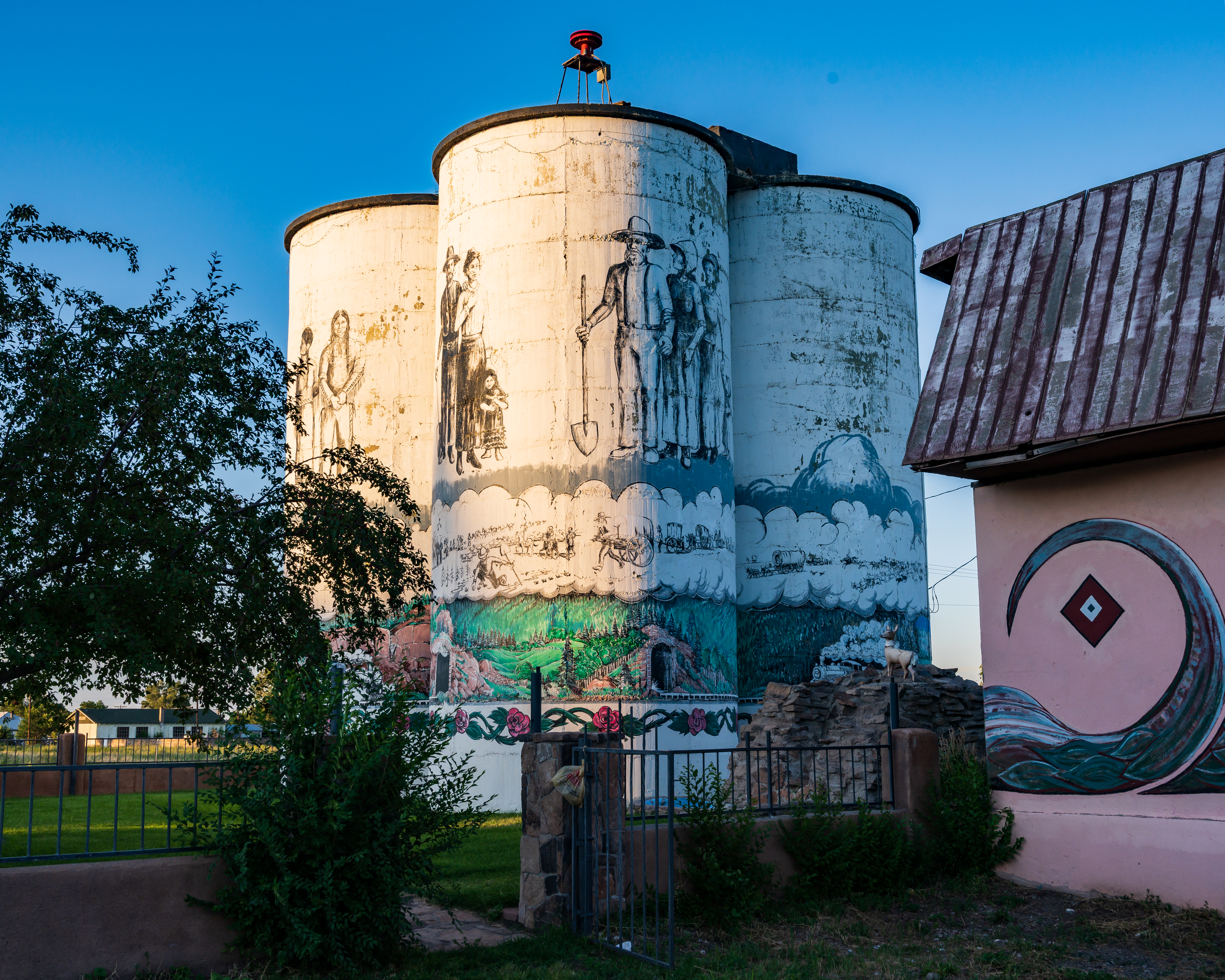
"The History of the San Luis Valley" at Silo Park, Antonito, CO.

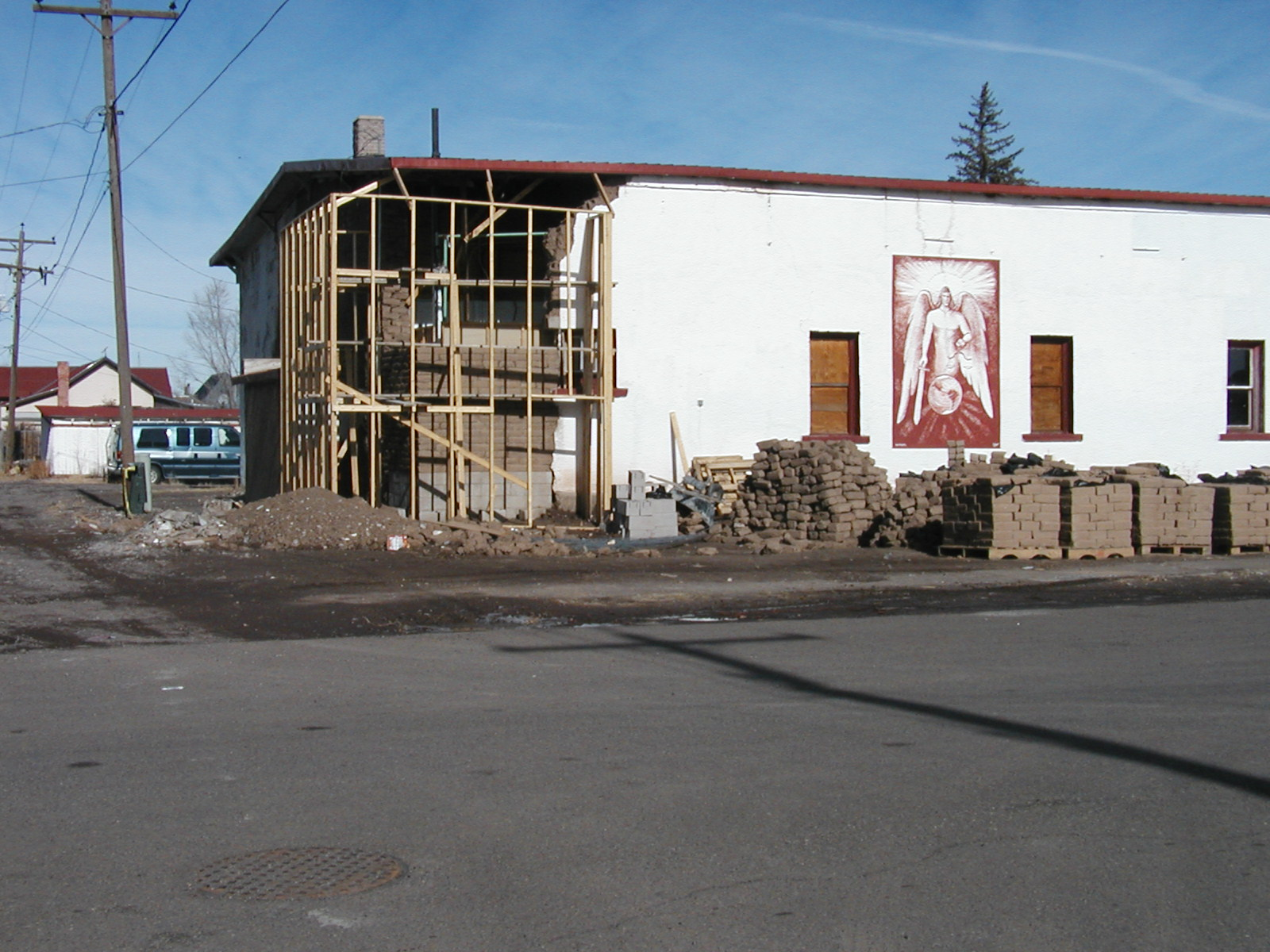
"San Miguel" as it appeared (circa 2005) during renovation of the S.P.M.D.T.U. in Antonito, CO.

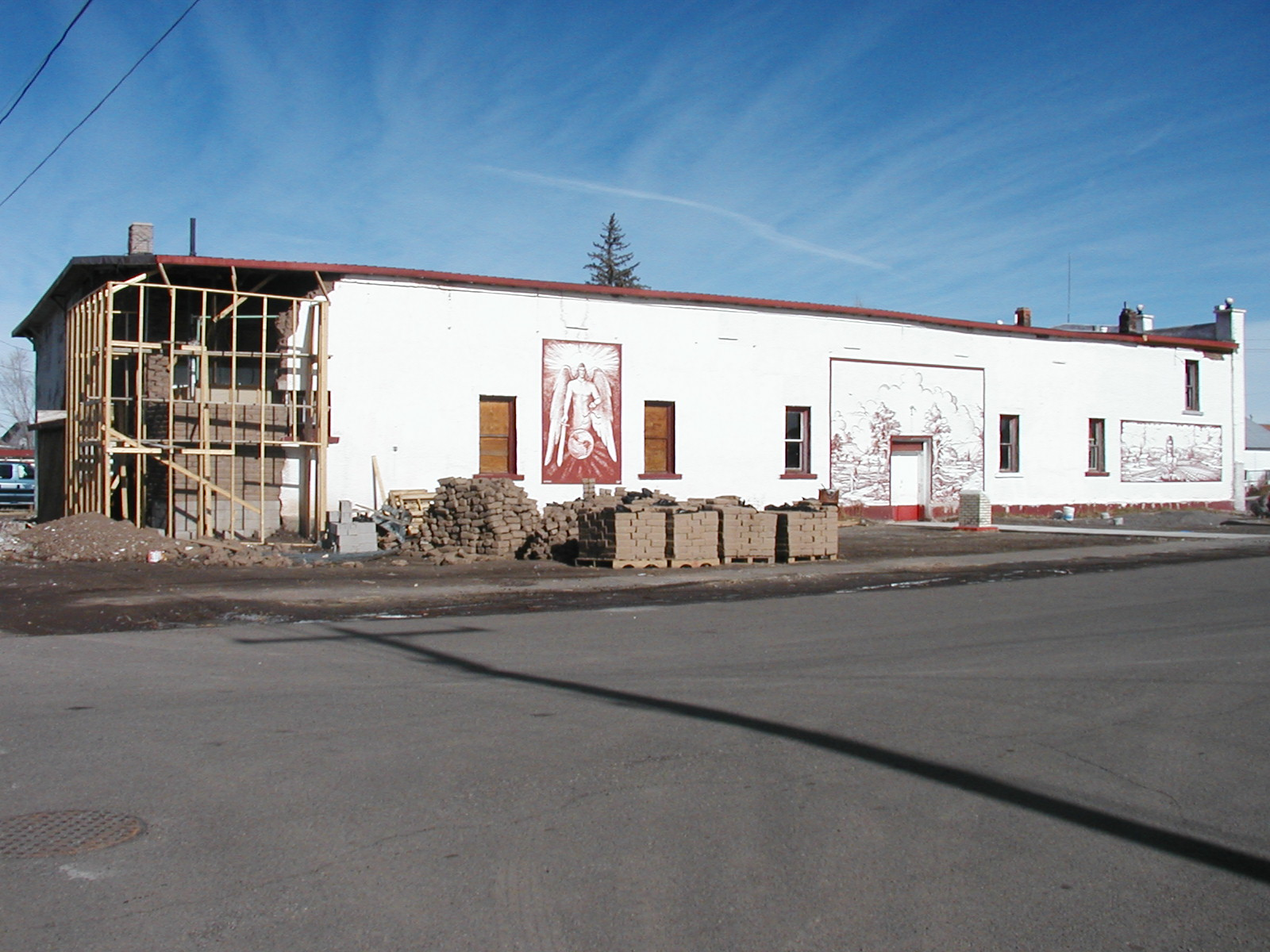
"San Miguel," "Los Trabajadores," and "La Alma - The Earth Mother" on the S.P.M.D.T.U. building in Antonito, CO (circa 2005) during renovation.

Site	Title/Subject	Dimensions	Notes
Antonito High School	Trojan Horse Design #1	4 x 6 ft.	no longer in existence
Antonito High School	Trojan Horse Design #2	4 x 6 ft.	no longer in existence
Antonito High School	Trojan Warrior	4 x 6 ft.	
Antonito High School	The Four Seasons	8 x 50 ft.	cafeteria/meeting rooms
Antonito High School	The Judgment of Paris	4 x 6 ft.	entry
Antonito High School	The Battle between Hector and Achilles	4 x 6 ft.	
Cristo El Rey Church	Dove of the Holy Spirit	4 x 10 ft.	altar mural
Cristo El Rey Church	Nine etched glass windows	2 x 8 ft. each	
Main Street	History of the Conejos River Region	16 x 100 ft.	
Main Street	Miracle at Tepeyac - Nuestra Señora del Valle de San Luis	7 x 28 ft.	
Main Street	Quetzalcoatl de Nuevo Aztlan - The Great Water Serpent of the Rio Grande	8 x 48 ft.	
Main Street	Mimbres Rabbit - Conejo for Conejos	14 ft. circle	
Main Street	Mimbres Trout - Truchas de Luz	10 ft. circle	
Main Street	Cattle Drive along the Cumbers and Toltec	4 x 8 ft.	oil, no longer in existence
Narrow Gauge Café	Sun/Eagle/Aspen	16 x 4 ft.	
Narrow Gauge Café	The Box Canyon of the Río San Antonio	4 x 6.5 ft.	
Narrow Gauge Motel	The Cumbers and Toltec Railroad - Four Seasons	4 x 23 ft.	
People's Drug Store (defunct)	The Main Street of Antonito - 199	4 x 18.5 ft.	
People's Drug Store (defunct)	Hayfield in the Bosque	4.5 x 32 ft.	no longer in existence
People's Drug Store (defunct)	San Antonio Mountain	4.5 x 42 ft.	no longer in existence
Private Homes		4 x 6 ft.	
Private Homes		4 x 8 ft.	
Private Homes		10 x 14 ft.	ceiling
Private Homes		8 x 14 ft.	ceiling, no longer in existence
Silo Park	The History of the San Luis Valley	40 ft. high each	across four silos
S.P.M.D.T.U. Hall	La Alma - The Earth Mother	9 x 22 ft.	no longer in existence
S.P.M.D.T.U. Hall	Los Trabajadores	20 x 22 ft.	no longer in existence
S.P.M.D.T.U. Hall	San Miguel	12.5 x 16 ft.	no longer in existence
U.S. Post Office	Ojo de Dios		outside
U.S. Post Office	American Eagle	4 x 18 ft.	interior mural, no longer in existence

===== La Jara =====
Site	Title/Subject	Dimensions	Notes
U.S. Post Office	The Conejos High Country	4 x 32 ft.	
High Valley Insurance Building	The High Valley	7 x 50 ft.	
Valdez Law Offices	Shepherd's Sunrise	8 x 38 ft.	
U.S. West Phone Building	The Old Platoro Line Terrace Reservoir	12 x 20 ft.	
La Jara Trading Post	The Wild Horses	10 x 130 ft.	
Probvost-Le Febre Wool Warehouse	The Rams	10 x 30 ft.	
Catholic Church	Adoration of the Magi	4 x 16 ft.	
Long Branch Saloon	Animal Map Alaska to Guatemala	4 x 10 ft.	
Centauri High School	Peregrine Falcon	15 x 25 ft.	entry
Centauri High School	Peregrine Falcon	10 x 23 ft.	gymnasium
Max Lara Home	Cañon Diablo	4 x 6 ft.	

===== Manassa =====
Site	Title/Subject	Dimensions	Notes
Town Hall		3 x 24 ft.	
Park	Jack Dempsey Portrait	8 x 12 ft.	
Main Street	Jack Dempsey in 1921	17 x 50 ft.	homage to George Bellows
Main Street	America's Farmers and Ranchers Feed the World	17 x 50 ft.	
Main Street	Hummingbirds and Columbine Clock	5 ft. diameter	
Mormon Pioneer Days Rodeo Grounds	Fence, Running Rodeo Animals	8 x 1,000 ft.	no longer in existence
Mormon Pioneer Days Rodeo Grounds	Bronco Busters	15 x 32 ft.	no longer in existence
Mayor's House	Eagle	4 x 6 ft.	

===== Other =====
Town/Village	Site	Title/Subject	Dimensions	Notes
Bountiful, CO	Conejos Propane Co.	San Luis Valley Sunrise	10 x 35 ft.	
Cañón	Valdino Gallegos House	Big Game Animals	8 x 16 ft.	
Cañón	Valdino Gallegos House	Elk	4 x 16 ft.	
Capulin, CO	Junior High School Gym	Peregrine Falcons	12 x 23 ft.	
Center, CO	La Frontera	Bright Promise	10 x 60 ft.	
Center, CO	Center High School	The McClure Memorial	12 x 34 ft.	
Conejos, CO	U.S. Post Office	The Old Plaza at Conejos	2 x 12 ft.	
Conejos, CO	U.S. Post Office	Gates	4 x 6 ft.	no longer in existence
Conejos, CO	U.S. Post Office	The Old Jaramillo House	5 x 12 ft.	
Conejos Canyon	Johnson House	Virgin of Guadalupe	4 x 8 ft.	
Creede, CO	Mineral County Courthouse	Al Randel Memorial Mural - Bristol Head	4 x 7 ft.	
Del Norte, CO	Rio Grande County Museum	Colorado's San Luis Valley	4 x 24 ft.	
Las Mesitas	Lionel Ruybal House	Los Mogotes	9 x 16 ft.	
Moffat, CO	Moffat/Crestone Schools	The Crestones	6 x 10 ft., 10 x 20 ft., 10 x 10 ft.	three-wall mural, no longer in existence
Mogote	Key's Mogote Store	Los Mogotes	4 x 18 ft.	
Rito Hondo	Art Trujillo House	Buffalo and Grizzly	10 x 16 ft.	
Romeo, CO	Silo at U.S. 285	Whooping Cranes	18 x 22 ft.	
Romeo, CO	Abe's Place (defunct)	The Evening Star (Six Sun Power Designs)	9 x 28 ft.	
Saguache, CO	Mountain Valley School	Cochetopa Pass Buffalos	10 x 40 ft.	
San Antonio	Jr. Madril House	Conejos Peak	8 x 15 ft.	
San Luis, CO	U.S. Post Office	San Luis - Colorado's Oldest Town	3 x 18 ft.	

==== Glenwood Springs ====
Site	Title/Subject	Dimensions	Notes
Summit Canyon Mountaineering	The Crystal and Roaring Fork Valleys from Mushroom Rock	15 x 16 ft.	oil
Highway 82 - Ed Larsh Barn	The Restore the Train Mural	18 x 60 ft.	no longer in existence
Glenwood Caverns and Adventure Park	Glenwood Caverns	22 x 40 ft.	
Colorado Mountain College Offices, Grand Ave. & 8th	The Flattops Wilderness	10 x 51 ft.	
Community Center Lobby	Chair Mountain in Fall	3 x 5 ft.	oil
Community Center Lobby	Goblin Gulch	3 x 5 ft.	oil
Community Center Lobby	No Name Arch	4 x 6 ft.	oil
Community Center Lobby	No Name Arch	4 x 6 ft.	oil
Community Center Lobby	Mount Sopris from Ski Sunlight	4 x 12 ft.	oil
Glenwood Springs Community Center	Caribbean Beach	9.5 x 11 ft.	
Glenwood Springs Community Center	Mt. Sopris	5 x 7 ft.	
Colorado Mountain College Blake Center	Geology of the West	2 x 6 ft.	
McConnell Home	Train Mural	3 x 12 ft. each	three walls
Old Cardiff School Park	Sunlight	3 x 4 ft.	panel
Old Cardiff School Park	Moonlight	3 x 4 ft.	panel
Calvin Lee and Assoc. Law Office	North Couloir - Mt. Sopris	3 x 4 ft.	
City Hall	Old Time Canyon	4 x 12 ft.	
City Hall	Flaming Gorge	6 x 8 ft.	
Red Mountain Inn	Pictographs and Petroglyphs	10 x 60 ft.	
Red Mountain Inn	Eaves	10 x 18 ft.	
Red Mountain Inn	Additional Eaves	3 x 7 ft., 10 x 18 ft.	
Ortega Home, Red Canyon	Coyotes and Moon	9 x 16 ft.	stairwell
Little Bavarian Restaurant	The Bederzee	5 x 9 ft.	
Little Bavarian Restaurant	The Little Bavarians	8.5 x 8.5 ft.	
Little Bavarian Restaurant	Bouquets of Gentians and Edelweiss	4 x 4 ft.	total of two
Little Bavarian Restaurant	Flowered sign border		
Colorado Canoe and Kayak, Grand Ave.	Mt. Sopris and the Roaring Fork and Crystal Rivers	12 x 22 ft.	

==== Other ====
Town/Village	Site	Title/Subject	Dimensions	Notes
Carbondale, CO	Dinkle Building	The Interconnected Web of Life - Chair Mountain and the Crystal River	9 x 48 ft.	
Carbondale, CO	Dinkle Building	The Crystal River and Mount Sopris	4 x 16 ft.	no longer in existence
Carbondale, CO	Fire House, Public Meeting Room	First Snow	4 x 16 ft.	
Carbondale, CO	City Hall	Los Mestizos	10 x 10 ft.	with Leo Tanguma for The Latino Festivals
Gunnison	Main Street	Gunnison Hayfields and Ohio Creek	17 x 62 ft.	
Leadville, CO	Main Street and 3rd	Leadville U.S.A.	18 x 42 ft.	
Leadville, CO	National Mining Hall of Fame and Museum	The Rockies - Mt. Massive and the Upper Arkansas	4 x 22 ft.	Seven murals collectively titled America's Great Mining Regions
Leadville, CO	National Mining Hall of Fame and Museum	The Desert - Sonoran Desert Thunderheads	4 x 23.5 ft.	
Leadville, CO	National Mining Hall of Fame and Museum	The East - Appalachian Autumn	4 x 24 ft.	
Leadville, CO	National Mining Hall of Fame and Museum	Man into Space - The First Steps	4 x 24 ft.	
Leadville, CO	National Mining Hall of Fame and Museum	Above Timberline	4 x 24 ft.	
Leadville, CO	National Mining Hall of Fame and Museum	The California Gold Rush - Chimney Rock, Nebraska	4 x 24 ft.	
Leadville, CO	National Mining Hall of Fame and Museum	The Old Log Flume - Lake Tahoe	4 x 24 ft.	
Rifle	Bookcliffs Arts Council Barn		8 x 28 ft.	with Diane Seabrook
Salida, CO		The Mighty Arkansas and the Angel of Shavano	14 x 100 ft.	
Salida, CO		Free The Monkey	5 x 10 ft.	two jungle signs
Salida, CO	Sawdusky Bldg., F Street	The High Mountains	4 x 8 ft.	
Snowmass Village		Snowmass Landscape	7.5 x 45 ft.	cut steel

=== Outside Colorado, national and international ===
Location	Site	Title/Subject	Dimensions	Notes
Oracle, AZ	Mother Cody's Cafe	Desert Night	15 x 42 ft.	no longer in existence
Oracle, AZ	Mother Cody's Cafe	White Buffalo - The Stampede	15 x 42 ft.	no longer in existence
Oracle, AZ	Acadia Ranch Museum	Cañada del Oro	5 x 21 ft.	
Oracle, AZ	Rancho Linda Vista	Falcon House	8 x 50 ft.	wraparound
Oracle, AZ	Waterbird House	Desert Vista and four doors with Waterbird designs	10 x 29 ft.	
Oracle, AZ	Jones House	Red Vista with Yuccas	10 x 32 ft.	
Tucson, AZ	Blue Willow Café	Blue Willow Legend	10 x 28 ft.	N. Campbell Ave.
Tucson, AZ	N. Campbell Ave. Parking Area	Blue Willow and Lovebirds	10 x 15 ft.	no longer in existence
Tucson, AZ	Creative Solutions Solar Consultants	Sun Power in the Desert	16 x 60 ft.	no longer in existence
Tucson, AZ	Tucson Art Museum	Desert Canyon	5 x 23 ft.	opening day mural
Roseberg, OR	First National Bank	The Rocky Mountains after Albert Bierstadt	4 x 8 ft.	W/M Moore and B. Bell
New York, NY	Manhattan Office Building - 48th Floor	Cherry Valley Moonrise	4 x 8 ft.	
Santa Fe, NM	Santa Fe Stoveworks	The Lenticular Cloud - Limber Pines at Timberline	4 x 8 ft.	
Quito, Ecuador	Adam and Eve Restaurant	The Garden of Eden	6 x 24 ft.	
