= Heinrich Brändli =

Swiss engineer and professor

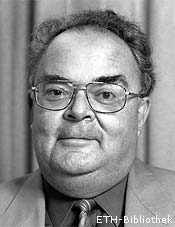

Heinrich Brändli (April 18, 1938 – April 12, 2018) was a Swiss engineer and professor of ETH Zürich. He dealt with transportation and railway technology.
