= James Endres =

American politician

Member of the South Dakota House of Representatives
- In office 1973–1980

Personal details
- Born: July 14, 1931
- Died: April 9, 2018 (aged 86)
- Party: Democratic

James Endres (July 14, 1931 – April 9, 2018) was an American politician. He served as a Democratic member of the South Dakota House of Representatives.

== Life and career ==
Endres served in the United States Army.

Endres served in the South Dakota House of Representatives from 1973 to 1980.

Endres died on April 9, 2018, at the age of 86.
