= 30 April 2018 Kabul suicide bombings =

Terrorist incident in Afghanistan in 2018

- Part of the War in Afghanistan
- Kabul (Afghanistan)
- Location: Kabul, Afghanistan
- Date: 30 April 2018 (UTC+4:30)
- Target: Security forces, journalists
- Attack type: Suicide bombings
- Weapon: Suicide vests
- Deaths: 29
- Injuries: 50
- Perpetrator: Islamic State of Iraq and the Levant – Khorasan Province

On 30 April 2018, two suicide bombers detonated near government buildings in central Kabul, Afghanistan, killing at least 29 people and injuring 50.

== Victims ==
Among the fatalities were 9 journalists, Agence France Presse photographer Shah Marai, TOLO News Cameraman Yar Mohammad Tokhi, Ebadollah Hananzi and Sabvon Kakeker of Radio Free Europe; Maharam Darani of Radio Azadai; TV1 cameramen's Ghazi Rasoli and Norozali Rajabi, the reporter Salim Talash and cameraman Ali Salimi both of Mashal TV. Additionally, an Al Jazeera cameraman Naser Hashemi, Omar Soltani of Reuters, Ahmadshah Azimi of Nedai Aghah, Ayar Amar of newspaper Vahdat Mili and Davod Ghisanai of the TV channel Mivand were injured.

== Perpetrator ==
The Islamic State has claimed responsibility for the attack though the Taliban is also suspected.

== See also ==
- List of terrorist incidents linked to Islamic State – Khorasan Province
- List of terrorist attacks in Kabul
