= Neil D. Humphrey =

American academic (1928–2018)

- Born: May 20, 1928; Idaho Falls, Idaho, US
- Died: April 30, 2018 (aged 89); Reno, Nevada, US
- Education: Idaho State University; University of Denver; Brigham Young University

Neil D. Humphrey (May 20, 1928 – April 30, 2018) was an American academic.

Humphrey attended Idaho State University, the University of Denver, and Brigham Young University. Early in his professional career, he was involved in public administration in Colorado. In 1955 he moved to Nevada and headed the Nevada Taxpayers Association. He was made Nevada State Budget director by Gov. Grant Sawyer. He was next recruited as vice president for finance at the University of Nevada. He was chancellor of the University of Nevada system from 1967 to 1977.

Humphrey was the president of the University of Alaska System in 1977, president of the University of Nevada System, and president of Youngstown State University from 1984 to 1992.
