= Politics of Basilicata =

Regional Italian politics

Municipalities of Basilicata, Italy

The politics of Basilicata, a region of Italy, takes place within the framework of an "anomalous presidential" representative democracy or prime-ministerial system with an executive presidency, whereby the President of Regional Government is the head of government, and of a pluriform multi-party system. Executive power is exercised by the Regional Government. Legislative power is vested in both the government and the Regional Council.

== Executive branch ==
The Regional Government (Giunta Regionale) is presided by the President of the Region (Presidente della Regione), who is elected for a five-year term, and is composed by the President and the Ministers (Assessori), who are currently 6, including a vice president.

=== List of presidents ===
Elected by the Regional Council (1970–1995)

№	Name	Term of office		Political party	Legislature
1	Vincenzo Verrastro	1970	1975	DC	I (1970)
1	Vincenzo Verrastro	1975	1980	DC	II (1975)
1	Vincenzo Verrastro	1980	1982	DC	III (1980)
2	Carmelo Azzarà	1982	1985	DC	III (1980)
3	Gaetano Michetti	1985	1990	DC	IV (1985)
4	Antonio Boccia	1990	1995	DC	V (1990)

Directly-elected presidents (since 1995)

N.	Portrait	President	Term of office		Tenure (Years and days)	Party	Composition	Legislature
5		Angelo Raffaele Dinardo (1932–2015)	15 June 1995	13 May 2000	4 years, 333 days	Italian People's Party	PDS–PPI–FL–PdD–FdV	VI (1995)
6		Filippo Bubbico (1954– )	13 May 2000	6 May 2005	4 years, 358 days	Democrats of the Left	DS–PPI–Dem–UDEUR–SDI– FdV–PRC–RI–PdCI	VII (2000)
7		Vito De Filippo (1963– )	6 May 2005	21 April 2010	8 years, 226 days	The Daisy/ Democratic Party	Ulivo–UDEUR–FdV– PRC–PdCI–IdV	VIII (2005)
7		Vito De Filippo (1963– )	21 April 2010	18 December 2013 (Note: Resigned on 24 April 2013 after a corruption scandal. Remained in office as acting President till a new regional election was called.)	8 years, 226 days	The Daisy/ Democratic Party	PD–IdV–UDC–PU– PSI–ApI–SEL	IX (2010)
8		Marcello Pittella (1962– )	18 December 2013	24 January 2019	5 years, 37 days	Democratic Party	PD–PSI–RI–CD	X (2013)
9		Vito Bardi (1951– )	16 April 2019	Incumbent	7 years, 159 days	Forza Italia	Lega–FI–FdI–IdeA	XI (2019)
9		Vito Bardi (1951– )	Re-elected		7 years, 159 days	Forza Italia	FdI–FI–Az–Lega	XII (2024)

== Legislative branch ==
The Regional Council of Basilicata (Consiglio Regionale della Basilicata) is composed of 30 members. 24 councillors are elected in provincial constituencies by proportional representation using the largest remainder method with a Droop quota and open lists, while 6 councillors (elected in bloc) come from a "regional list", including the President-elect. One seat is reserved for the candidate who comes second. If a coalition wins more than 50% of the total seats in the council with PR, only 3 candidates from the regional list will be chosen and the number of those elected in provincial constituencies will be 26. If the winning coalition receives less than 40% of votes special seats are added to the council to ensure a large majority for the President's coalition.

The council is elected for a five-year term, but, if the President suffers a vote of no confidence, resigns or dies, under the simul stabunt, simul cadent clause introduced in 1999 (literally they will stand together or they will fall together), also the council is dissolved and a snap election is called.

=== Current composition ===
The Regional Council of Basilicata is currently composed of the following political groups:

Party	Seats	Status
Brothers of Italy	4 / 21	In government
Forza Italia	3 / 21	In government
League	2 / 21	In government
Lucanian Pride	2 / 21	In government
Action	2 / 21	External support
Democratic Party	2 / 21	In opposition
Five Star Movement	2 / 21	In opposition
Basilicata Common House	2 / 21	In opposition
AVS – PSI – Positive Basilicata	1 / 21	In opposition
Democratic Basilicata	1 / 21	In opposition

== Local government ==
=== Provinces ===
Province	Inhabitants	President	Party	Election
Matera (list)	198,190	Francesco Mancini	Democratic Party	2024
Potenza (list)	365,304	Christian Giordano	Five Star Movement	2022

=== Municipalities ===
Provincial capitals

Municipality	Inhabitants	Mayor	Party	Election
Matera (list)	60,459	Domenico Bennardi	Five Star Movement	2020
Potenza (list)	66,809	Mario Guarente	League	2019

== Parties and elections ==
=== Latest regional election ===
In the latest regional election, which took place on 21-22 April 2024, incumbent president Vito Bardi of Forza Italia was re-elected at the head of a centre-right coalition, enlarged to Action and Italia Viva (within Lucanian Pride). Brothers of Italy was the largest party.

21–22 April 2024 Basilicata regional election results
Candidates	Votes	%	Seats	Parties	Votes	%	Seats
Vito Bardi	153,088	56.63	1	Brothers of Italy	45,458	17.39	4
Vito Bardi	153,088	56.63	1	Forza Italia	34,018	13.01	3
Vito Bardi	153,088	56.63	1	League	20,430	7.81	2
Vito Bardi	153,088	56.63	1	Action	19,646	7.51	2
Vito Bardi	153,088	56.63	1	Lucanian Pride (incl. IV)	18,371	7.03	1
Vito Bardi	153,088	56.63	1	Union of the Centre–DC–PU	6,636	2.54	–
Vito Bardi	153,088	56.63	1	True Basilicata	5,822	2.23	–
Vito Bardi	153,088	56.63	1	Total	150,381	57.52	12
Piero Marrese	113,979	42.16	1	Democratic Party	36,254	13.87	2
Piero Marrese	113,979	42.16	1	Common House Basilicata	29,228	11.88	2
Piero Marrese	113,979	42.16	1	Five Star Movement	20,026	7.66	2
Piero Marrese	113,979	42.16	1	Greens and Left Alliance–PSI–Possible Basilicata	15,144	5.79	1
Piero Marrese	113,979	42.16	1	United Basilicata	7,483	2.87	–
Piero Marrese	113,979	42.16	1	Total	108,135	41.36	7
Eustachio Follia	3,269	1.21	–	Volt Italy	2,947	1.13	–
Invalid votes	18,197	–					
Total candidates	270,336	100.00	2	Total parties	261,463	100.00	19
Registered voters	567,939	49.81					
Source: Ministry of the Interior – Results
