= List of presidents of Basilicata =

This is the list of presidents of Basilicata since 1970.

Elected by the Regional Council (1970–1995)

№	Name	Term of office		Political party	Legislature
1	Vincenzo Verrastro	1970	1975	DC	I (1970)
1	Vincenzo Verrastro	1975	1980	DC	II (1975)
1	Vincenzo Verrastro	1980	1982	DC	III (1980)
2	Carmelo Azzarà	1982	1985	DC	III (1980)
3	Gaetano Michetti	1985	1990	DC	IV (1985)
4	Antonio Boccia	1990	1995	DC	V (1990)

Directly-elected presidents (since 1995)

N.	Portrait	President	Term of office		Tenure (Years and days)	Party	Composition	Legislature
5		Angelo Raffaele Dinardo (1932–2015)	15 June 1995	13 May 2000	4 years, 333 days	Italian People's Party	PDS–PPI–FL–PdD–FdV	VI (1995)
6		Filippo Bubbico (1954– )	13 May 2000	6 May 2005	4 years, 358 days	Democrats of the Left	DS–PPI–Dem–UDEUR–SDI– FdV–PRC–RI–PdCI	VII (2000)
7		Vito De Filippo (1963– )	6 May 2005	21 April 2010	8 years, 226 days	The Daisy/ Democratic Party	Ulivo–UDEUR–FdV– PRC–PdCI–IdV	VIII (2005)
7		Vito De Filippo (1963– )	21 April 2010	18 December 2013 (Note: Resigned on 24 April 2013 after a corruption scandal. Remained in office as acting President till a new regional election was called.)	8 years, 226 days	The Daisy/ Democratic Party	PD–IdV–UDC–PU– PSI–ApI–SEL	IX (2010)
8		Marcello Pittella (1962– )	18 December 2013	24 January 2019	5 years, 37 days	Democratic Party	PD–PSI–RI–CD	X (2013)
9		Vito Bardi (1951– )	16 April 2019	Incumbent	7 years, 129 days	Forza Italia	Lega–FI–FdI–IdeA	XI (2019)
9		Vito Bardi (1951– )	Re-elected		7 years, 129 days	Forza Italia	FdI–FI–Az–Lega	XII (2024)
