= Gianni Pittella =

Italian politician (born 1958)

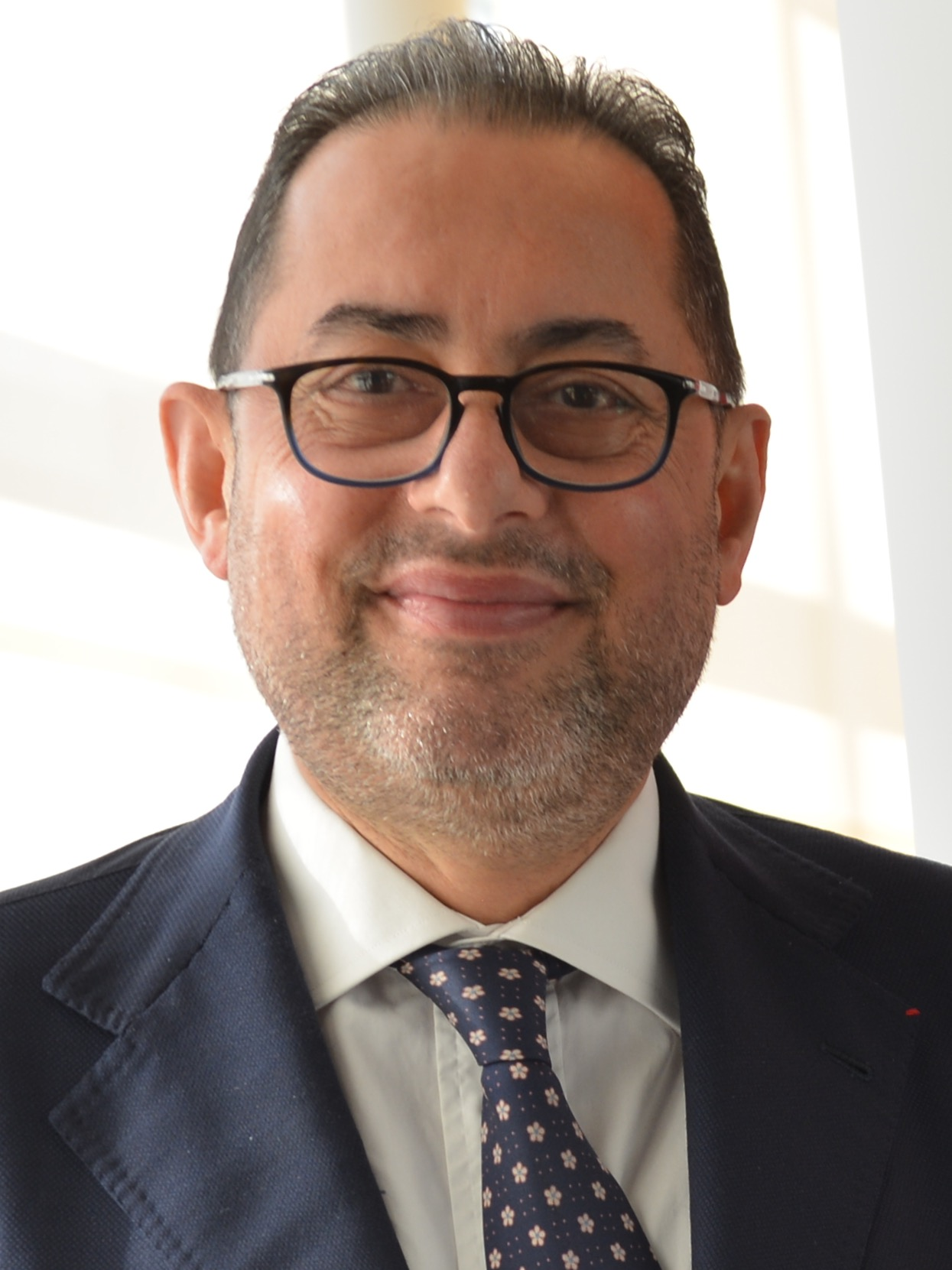
- Pittella in 2017

Mayor of Lauria
- Incumbent
- Assumed office 5 October 2021
- Preceded by: Angelo Lamboglia

Leader of the Progressive Alliance of Socialists and Democrats
- In office 1 July 2014 – 4 March 2018
- Preceded by: Martin Schulz (acting)
- Succeeded by: Maria João Rodrigues (acting)

President of the European Parliament
- Acting; 18 June 2014 – 1 July 2014
- Preceded by: Martin Schulz
- Succeeded by: Martin Schulz

First Vice-President of the European Parliament
- In office 14 July 2009 – 1 July 2014
- President: Jerzy Buzek; Martin Schulz
- Preceded by: Rodi Kratsa-Tsagaropoulou
- Succeeded by: Antonio Tajani

Member of the Senate of the Republic
- In office 23 March 2018 – 12 October 2022
- Constituency: Campania

Member of the European Parliament for Southern Italy
- In office 13 June 1999 – 22 March 2018

Member of the Chamber of Deputies
- In office 9 May 1996 – 23 September 1999
- Constituency: Basilicata (Lauria)

Personal details
- Born: Giovanni Saverio Furio Pittella; 19 November 1958 (age 67) Lauria, Italy
- Party: PSI (until 1994); FL (1994–1998); DS (1998–2007); PD (2007–2022); Action (since 2022)
- Other political affiliations: Progressive Alliance of Socialists and Democrats
- Spouse: Aurora
- Children: 2
- Parent(s): Domenico Pittella (father); Laurita (mother)
- Relatives: Marcello Pittella (brother)
- Education: University of Naples Federico II

Giovanni Saverio Furio "Gianni" Pittella (born 19 November 1958) is an Italian politician who is serving as the mayor of Lauria since 2021. Like his father and younger brother, Pittella began his political career in the Italian Socialist Party. He and his brother later joined the Labour Federation and the Democrats of the Left within the centre-left coalition, at that time known as The Olive Tree. He was a member of the Chamber of Deputies from 1996 to 1999. In 2007, the Pittellas were among the founding members of the Democratic Party.

From 1999 to 2018, Pittella was a member of the European Parliament from Italy, achieving significant political positions, including First Vice-President of the European Parliament from 2009 to 2014, president of the European Parliament from June to July 2014, and leader of the Progressive Alliance of Socialists and Democrats from 2014 to 2018; he also served as a member of various parliamentary committees.

From 2018 to 2022, Pittella served as a member of the Senate of the Republic. In 2022, he and his brother left the Democratic Party after not being selected among the candidates for the snap election and joined the Action party. In 2024, Pittella dissented from his brother, who switched his support to the regional centre-right coalition.

== Early life and family ==
Pittella was born on 19 November 1958 in Lauria, a small town of the Southern Italian region Basilicata. He graduated in medicine and surgery, and later specialized in legal and forensic medicine at the University of Naples Federico II. He is the son of Domenico Pittella, who was a member of the Senate of the Republic from 1972 to 1983 in the Basilicata constituency. His younger brother, Marcello Pittella, is also a politician, who was the president of Basilicata from 2013 to 2019. Referred to as the Pittellas, they are considered a dynasty within the Italian region of Basilicata.

== Career ==
=== Local and national political career ===
Following the political career of his father and his brother, Pittella was a member of the Italian Socialist Party, the Labour Federation, and the Democrats of the Left. At the age of 21, he was elected to the municipal council of his hometown Lauria and a year later became a member of the Regional Council of Basilicata with responsibility for training, culture and productive activities. After his graduation, Pittella remained very much involved in local and national politics. He was a member of the Italian Socialist Party and regional secretary of Young Socialists in Basilicata. With the Italian Socialist Party, he became Lauria's municipal councillor in 1979 and member of Basilicata's regional council in 1980, the youngest regional councilor in Italy. In the 1994 Italian general election, Pittella record the highest percentage of vote for the Italian Socialist Party. In the subsequent 1994 European Parliament election in Italy, he recorded the highest number of preferential vote (about 30,000) among those who were not elected. In the 1996 Italian general election, he was elected to the Italian Parliament as a member of the Labour Federation. In 2013, Pittella was a member of the national leadership council of the Democratic Party, then led by Pier Luigi Bersani. He took part in the 2013 Democratic Party leadership election. He came fourth out of four with 5.7% in the vote by party members, thus being excluded to the subsequent primary election.

=== Member of the European Parliament ===
In the 1999 European Parliament election in Italy, Pittella was elected to the European Parliament with 64,499 preferential votes and became a member of the Progressive Alliance of Socialists and Democrats. He was re-elected with 138,876 preferential votes in the 2004 European Parliament election in Italy. He obtained a similar result in the 2009 European Parliament election in Italy. Pittella's most successful re-election was in the 2014 European Parliament election in Italy, where the Progressive Alliance of Socialists and Democrats became the largest group from Italy as he added over 100,000 votes to his 2009 result; this placed him ahead of party-colleague Pina Picierno, the candidate hand-picked by the then Italian prime minister Matteo Renzi to lead the Democratic Party list in the European Parliament's Southern Italy constituency.

In the European Parliament, Pittella first served on the Committee on Budgets between 1999 and 2009. In this capacity, he was the European Parliament's rapporteur on the 2006 budget, the last under a seven-year expenditure framework. He later was a member of the Committee on the Internal Market and Consumer Protection (2009–2012) and the Committee on Culture and Education (2012–2014). Within his parliamentary group, he led the Italian delegation within the Progressive Alliance of Socialists and Democrats and also served as the group's First Vice-chairman between 1999 and 2014 under the leadership of successive chairmen Enrique Barón Crespo (1999–2004), Martin Schulz (2004–2012), and Hannes Swoboda (2012–2014).

Pittella served as one of the 14 vice-presidents of the European Parliament from 14 July 2009 to 1 July 2014. Following the 2014 European Parliament election in Italy, he was elected with 96 percent of the votes as the president of the Progressive Alliance of Socialists and Democrats, the second largest political group at the European Parliament and the only one with members from all 28 European Union member states. In addition to his committee assignments and party functions, Pittella served on the Parliament's delegation. He was previously a member of the delegation for relations with Albania, Bosnia and Herzegovina, Serbia, Montenegro, and Kosovo (2009–2014), with Australia and New Zealand (2002–2004), and with Armenia, Azerbaijan, and Georgia (1999–2002).

Earlier in 2012 while still in Brussels, Pittella had introduced Simona Mangiante to Joseph Mifsud, an academic from Malta reportedly with high level ties with the Russian government. At the time, Mangiante worked for the European Parliament as an attorney specializing in child abduction cases. Later, she worked as an administrator to the European Parliament Committee on Civil Liberties, Justice and Home Affairs during the Seventh European Parliament. In 2018, Mangiante said that he "always saw Mifsud with Pittella" and that Pittella, who did not comment, suggested she go to work for Mifsud in London. (Note: While in London, Simona Mangiante met George Papadopoulos during the Donald Trump 2016 presidential campaign, and the two got married in 2018. Papadopoulos was convicted as part of the Mueller special counsel investigation into Russian interference in the 2016 United States elections. See Helderman, Rosalind S.; Hsu, Spencer (7 September 2018). "Former Trump adviser George Papadopoulos sentenced to 14 days in plea deal with Mueller probe". The Washington Post.)

Pittella attended the 2016 Democratic National Convention in Philadelphia to watch the nomination of Hillary Clinton. Alongside Brando Benifei, he was there in support of Bernie Sanders, to whom he asked for a fan pic. By the end of the week, Pittella urged Americans to not vote for Donald Trump, saying: "Europe needs the U.S. We need Hillary Clinton." During his time in Philadelphia, Pittella also warned local businesspeople and supporters about fascism. He said: "I have taken the unprecedented step of endorsing and campaigning for Hillary Clinton because the risk of Donald Trump is too high. I believe it is in the interest of the European Union and Italy to have Hillary Clinton in office. A Trump victory could be a disaster for the relationship between the U.S.A. and Italy."

=== Return to Italian politics ===
In the 2018 Italian general election, Pittella was elected to the Senate of the Republic, having been invited to stand by Democratic Party secretary Matteo Renzi. He subsequently resigned as leader of the Progressive Alliance of Socialists and Democrats group. In 2021, Pittella was elected mayor of Lauria. In 2022, Pittella left the Democratic Party and alongside his brother, who was not chosen as candidate within the Democratic Party, joined the Action party led by former Democratic Party member Carlo Calenda. Ahead of the 2024 Basilicata regional election, Pittella dissented from his brother, who alleged vetoes within the centre-left coalition and went on to successfully join the centre-right coalition in support of the incumbent president Vito Bardi.

== Personal life ==
Pittella is married and has two children. Besides his political work, he is the author of several books, including among others on the future and challenges of the European project, such as Rosso Antico (1996), Diario di bordo (1997), Sparlare, parlare, pensare (1998), Eurodiario (1999–2000), Il Triangolo della ricchezza (2003), Europ@ (2004), Dal Sud in Europa con te (2004), Partiti europei e gruppi politici nel nuovo europarlamento dell'Unione a 25 (2004), Un'Europa per i cittadini (2006), and Brief History of the Future of the United States of Europe (2013). He was the founder and director of the magazine Il Segno Mediterraneo. He is also a visiting professor at the University of East Anglia's London Academy of Diplomacy and ex-officio member of the bureau of the Fondation européenne d'études progressistes (FEPS). Pittella is an honorary citizen of the city of Buenos Aires. In September 2013, his younger brother, Marcello Pittella, whose political trajectory is very similar to that of his older brother, won the centre-left coalition primary election for the presidency of Basilicata. In November 2013, he was elected president by a landslide.

== Notes ==
Political offices
Preceded by Martin Schulz	President of the European Parliament; Acting; 2014	Succeeded by Martin Schulz
Party political offices
Preceded by Martin Schulz; Acting	Leader of the Progressive Alliance of Socialists and Democrats; 2014–2018	Succeeded by Maria João Rodrigues; Acting
