= 2013 Basilicata regional election =

10th election of the Regional Council and president of Basilicata

- 17–18 November 2013

All 21 seats to the Regional Council of Basilicata
- Turnout: 47.60% (▼15.21%)
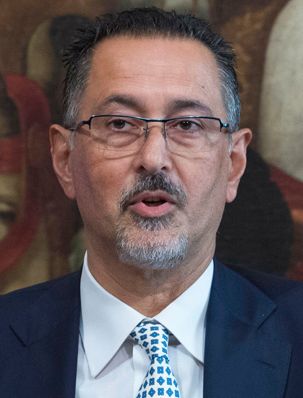

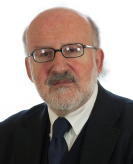

	Majority party	Minority party	Third party
Leader	Marcello Pittella	Salvatore Di Maggio	Piernicola Pedicini
Party	Democratic Party	Civic Choice	Five Star Movement
Alliance	Centre-left	Centre-right
Seats won	13	5	2
Seat change	▼6	▼5	New
Popular vote	148,696	48,370	32,919
Percentage	59.6%	19.4%	13.2%
Swing	▼1.1%	▼8.5%	New
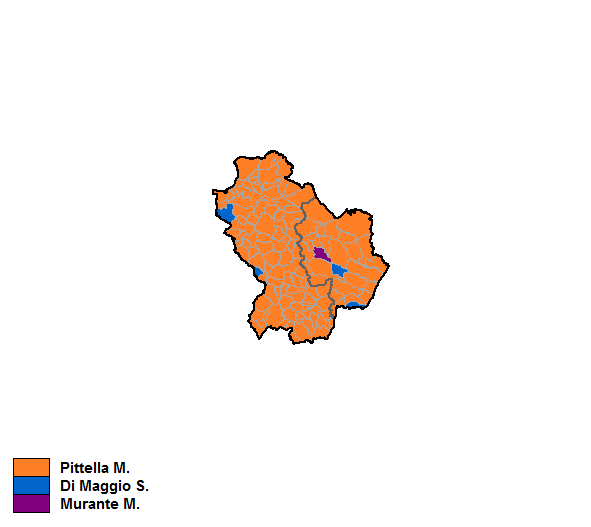
President before election
Vito De Filippo
Democratic Party
President-elect
Marcello Pittella
Democratic Party

The 2013 Basilicata regional election took place on 17–18 November 2013. The election was for all 21 seats, reduced from 30, of the Regional Council of Basilicata and the president of Basilicata, who automatically became a member of the council alongside the second-placed candidate. It was the last election of the 2013 Italian regional elections.

The snap election was called upon the resignation of the incumbent president of Basilicata, Vito De Filippo of the Democratic Party, on 24 April 2013 and the subsequent dissolution of the Regional Council of Basilicata. Several regional ministers and councillors had been involved in an expenses scandal, and one minister and two councillors had been arrested.

As Basilicata is a traditional stronghold of the centre-left coalition, Marcello Pittella (a former Italian Socialist Party member and brother of Gianni Pittella, the then Vice President of the European Parliament) was elected by a landslide 59.6% of the votes. Its main opponent, Tito Di Maggio of Civic Choice (supported by the centre-right coalition, comprising The People of Freedom and the Union of the Centre), gained 19.4% of the votes. The Democratic Party was the most voted party with 24.8%, followed by Pittella's personal list with 16.0%.

== Background ==
In the 2010 Basilicata regional election, the incumbent president Vito De Filippo won in a landslide election. On 24 April 2013, De Filippo resigned, resulting in a snap election. He had resigned after investigations into councilors and aldermen led to the house arrest of two centre-left coalition councilors (Vicenzo Viti of the Democratic Party and Rosa Mastrosimone of Italy of Values) and the People of Freedom group leader and 2010 candidate Nicola Pagliuca. They were later released. Additionally, the Regional Council of Basilicata had its seats reduced from 30 to 20. Basilicata is considered the political equivalent of the left-wing Emilia-Romagna region in Southern Italy.

The centre-left coalition chose its candidate through a primary election held on 22 September 2013. In an upset Marcello Pittella, the brother of Gianni Pittella, defeated the province of Potenza president and official candidate Piero Lacorazza of the Democratic Party, Nicola Benedetto of the Democratic Centre, and Miko Somma of the Lucan Community – No Oil Movement. The Five Star Movement also chose its candidate with primaries held on 4 October 2013. The winner was the lieutenant of the provincial Police of Potenza Giuseppe Di Bello, who was excluded the same day by Beppe Grillo for "formal irregularities in the presentation of documents"; thus, the presidential candidate became the runner-up Piernicola Pedicini.

To the left wing of the centre-left coalition, the candidate was Maria Murante, regional secretary of Left Ecology Freedom; the list in support of Murante was Basilicata 2.0, which was made up of Left Ecology Freedom, Communist Refoundation Party, Civil Action, Let's Free Basilicata, and Live Tramutola. Earlier, an alliance between Left Ecology Freedom and the Five Star Movement had been discussed. Di Bello had created the alternative list Let's Free Basilicata, through which he sought an agreement with Left Ecology Freedom and with a list organized by Silvana Arbia, chancellor of the International Criminal Court and hypothesized as a presidential candidate. The latter's last-minute resignation led to the reduction of the coalition to two lists and the candidacy of Murante as president. For the centre-right coalition, the candidate was Salvatore Di Maggio, senator of Civic Choice. The coalition included the Union of the Centre, which in the previous legislature was instead part with a councillor of the centre-left coalition majority.

== Political parties and candidates ==
Political party or alliance	Constituent lists	Previous result		Candidate
Political party or alliance	Constituent lists	Votes (%)	Seats	Candidate
Centre-left coalition	Democratic Party (PD)	27.1	7	Marcello Pittella
Centre-left coalition	Italy of Values (IdV)	9.9	3	Marcello Pittella
Centre-left coalition	Italian Socialist Party (PSI)	4.7	1	Marcello Pittella
Centre-left coalition	Reality Italy (RI)	—N/a	—N/a	Marcello Pittella
Centre-left coalition	Pittella for President	—N/a	—N/a	Marcello Pittella
Centre-left coalition	Democratic Centre (CD) (incl. PU)	—N/a	—N/a	Marcello Pittella
Centre-right coalition	The People of Freedom (PdL)	19.4	7	Salvatore Di Maggio
Centre-right coalition	Union of the Centre (UdC)	7.4	2	Salvatore Di Maggio
Centre-right coalition	Basilicata Laboratory (FdI, SC, and GS)	—N/a	—N/a	Salvatore Di Maggio
Centre-right coalition	Moderates in Revolution (MIR)	—N/a	—N/a	Salvatore Di Maggio
Basilicata 2.0 (SEL) (incl. PRC)		4.0	1	Maria Murante
Five Star Movement (M5S)		—N/a	—N/a	Piernicola Pedicini
Workers' Communist Party (PCL)		—N/a	—N/a	Florenzo Doino
Matera Moves (MM)		—N/a	—N/a	Doriano Manuello
Work and Pensions (LP)		—N/a	—N/a	Franco Grillo
Rose in the Fist (RnP)		—N/a	—N/a	Elisabetta Zamparutti

== Results ==
17 November 2013 Basilicata regional election results
Candidates	Votes	%	Seats	Parties	Votes	%	Seats
Marcello Pittella	148,696	59.60	3	Democratic Party	58.730	24.84	4
Marcello Pittella	148,696	59.60	3	Pittella for President	37,861	16.01	3
Marcello Pittella	148,696	59.60	3	Italian Socialist Party	17,680	7.48	1
Marcello Pittella	148,696	59.60	3	Reality Italy	14,012	5.93	1
Marcello Pittella	148,696	59.60	3	Democratic Centre	11,938	5.05	1
Marcello Pittella	148,696	59.60	3	Italy of Values	8,160	3.45	–
Marcello Pittella	148,696	59.60	3	Total	148.381	62.75	10
Salvatore Di Maggio	48,370	19.39	1	The People of Freedom	29,022	12.27	2
Salvatore Di Maggio	48,370	19.39	1	Basilicata Laboratory (FdI, SC, and GS)	12,033	5.09	1
Salvatore Di Maggio	48,370	19.39	1	Union of the Centre	9,002	3.81	1
Salvatore Di Maggio	48,370	19.39	1	Moderates in Revolution	847	0.36	–
Salvatore Di Maggio	48,370	19.39	1	Total	50.904	21,53	4
Piernicola Pedicini	32,919	13.19	–	Five Star Movement	21,219	8.97	2
Maria Murante	12,888	5.17	–	Basilicata 2.0	12,204	5.16	1
Florenzo Doino	2,178	0.87	–	Workers' Communist Party	869	0.37	–
Doriano Manuello	1,917	0.77	–	Matera Moves	1,370	0.58	–
Franco Grillo	1,300	0.52	–	Work and Pensions	799	0.34	–
Elisabetta Zamparutti	1,215	0.49	–	Rose in the Fist	724	0.31	–
Total candidates	249,483	100.00	4	Total parties	236,470	100.00	17
Registered voters	575,160	47.60					
Source: Ministry of the Interior – Results

Popular vote
PD	24.84%
Pittella List	16.01%
PdL	12.27%
M5S	8.97%
PSI	7.48%
RI	5.93%
SEL	5.16%
FdI–SC–GS	5.09%
CD	5.05%
UdC	3.81%
IdV	3.45%
Others	1.94%

President
Pittella	59.60%
Di Maggio	19.39%
Pedicini	13.19%
Murante	5.17%
Others	2.65%

=== Voter turnout ===
Region	Turnout
Basilicata	47.60%
Province	Turnout
Potenza	47.87%
Matera	47.02%
