= 2005 Basilicata regional election =

8th election of the Regional Council and president of Basilicata

← 2000	17–18 April 2005	2010 →

All 30 seats to the Regional Council of Basilicata
- Turnout: 67.16% (▼5.50%)
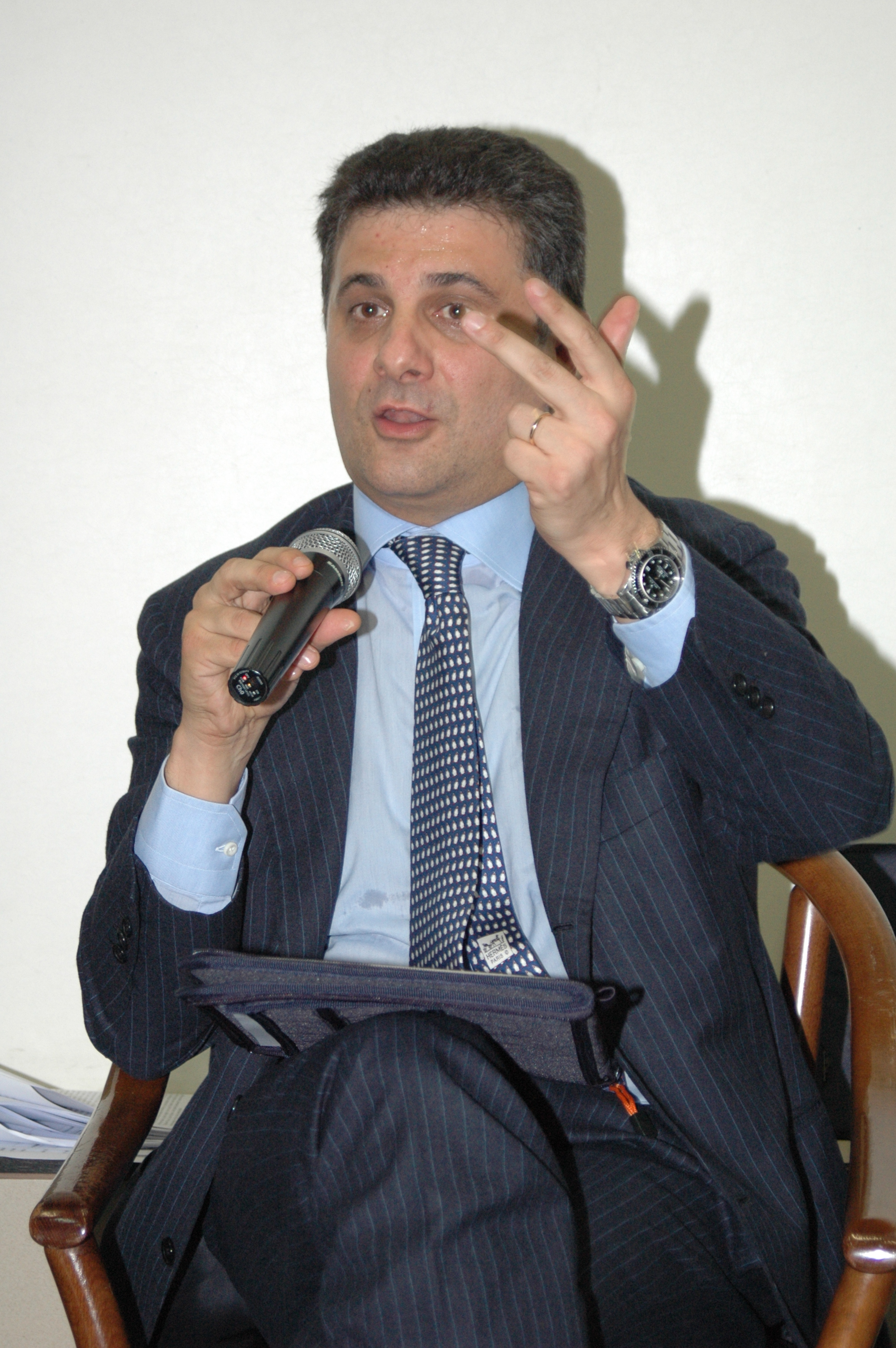

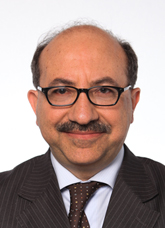
	Majority party	Minority party
Leader	Vito De Filippo	Cosimo Latronico
Party	The Daisy	Forza Italia
Alliance	The Union	House of Freedoms
Seats won	20	10
Seat change	▼1	▲1
Popular vote	236,479	101,725
Percentage	67.0%	28.8%
Swing	▲2.7%	▼6.3%
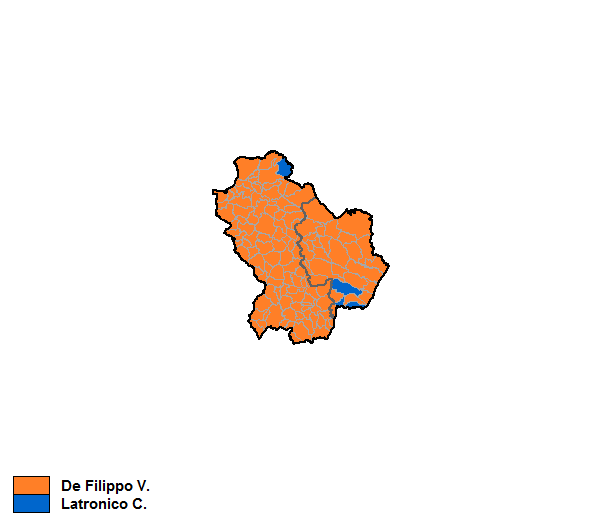
President before election
Angelo Raffaele Dinardo
PPI
President-elect
Vito De Filippo
The Daisy

The 2005 Basilicata regional election took place on 17–18 April 2005. The election was for all 30 seats of the Regional Council of Basilicata and the president of Basilicata, who automatically became a member of the council alongside two other seats, plus that of the second-placed candidate. It was the third-last election of the 2005 Italian regional elections. Due to some legal issues with the presentation of the list of Social Alternative, Basilicata did not vote along with the other Italian regions in on 3–4 April 2005 regional elections but a couple of weeks later instead. The victory of The Union coalition, which obtained more than two thirds of the vote, was the largest in Italy and Vito De Filippo of Democracy is Freedom – The Daisy, the youngest president of Basilicata and the most voted president of a region in percentage terms, was elected president by a landslide. As part of what became a over 20-year rule of the centre-left coalition, the results in Basilicata reflected their comparison as the political equivalent of the left-wing Emilia-Romagna region in Southern Italy.

== Results ==
17–18 April 2005 Basilicata regional election results
Candidates	Votes	%	Seats	Parties	Votes	%	Seats
Vito De Filippo	236,479	67.00	3	The Olive Tree	133,104	38.65	10
Vito De Filippo	236,479	67.00	3	UDEUR	38,042	11.05	3
Vito De Filippo	236,479	67.00	3	Federation of the Greens	19,592	5.69	1
Vito De Filippo	236,479	67.00	3	Communist Refoundation Party	15,992	4.64	1
Vito De Filippo	236,479	67.00	3	Party of Italian Communists	14,332	4.16	1
Vito De Filippo	236,479	67.00	3	Italy of Values	9,511	2.76	1
Vito De Filippo	236,479	67.00	3	Pact of Liberal Democrats	6,006	1.74	0
Vito De Filippo	236,479	67.00	3	Total	236,579	68.70	17
Cosimo Latronico	101,725	28.82	1	Forza Italia	43,658	12.68	4
Cosimo Latronico	101,725	28.82	1	Union of Christian and Centre Democrats	27,100	7.87	3
Cosimo Latronico	101,725	28.82	1	National Alliance	22,553	6.55	2
Cosimo Latronico	101,725	28.82	1	Federation of the Centre (PRI–DCU–DCA–PLI)	3,124	0.91	-
Cosimo Latronico	101,725	28.82	1	Total	96,435	28.00	9
Margherita Torrio	8,780	2.49	–	Socialist Party – New PSI	7,979	2.32	0
Roberto Fiore	3,547	1.00	–	Social Alternative	2,335	0.68	0
Angela Mancuso	2,436	0.69	–	Popular Unity	1,014	0.29	0
Total candidates	352,967	100.00	4	Total parties	344,342	100.00	26
Registered voters	372,256	67.16					
Source: Ministry of the Interior – Results
