= 2024 Basilicata regional election =

12th election of the Regional Council and president

- 21–22 April 2024

All 21 seats to the Regional Council of Basilicata
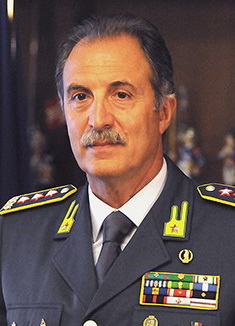

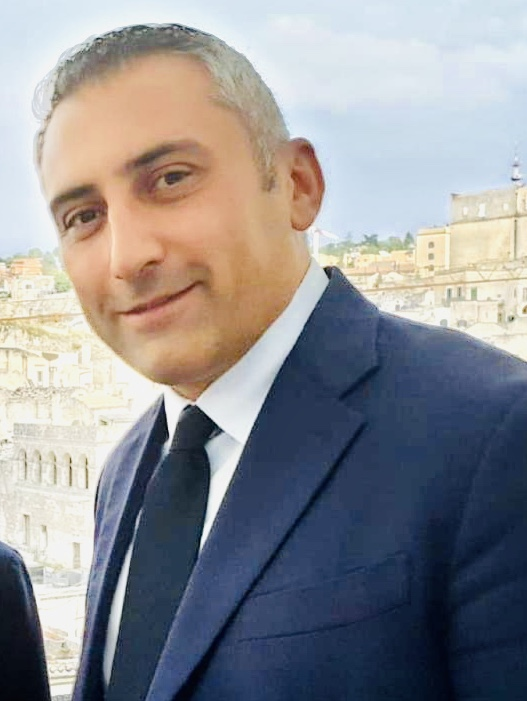
	Majority party	Minority party
Candidate	Vito Bardi	Piero Marrese
Party	Forza Italia	Democratic Party
Alliance	Centre-right	Centre-left
Seats won	13	8
Seat change	Steady	Steady
Popular vote	153,088	113,979
Percentage	56.6%	42.2%
Swing	▲14.4%	▼15.6% (Note: Compared to the combined vote share achieved in the 2019 Basilicata regional election by the centre-left coalition, the Five Star Movement and Possible, which at the time were not allied.)
President before election
Vito Bardi
FI
Elected President
Vito Bardi
FI

The 2024 Basilicata regional election was held on 21 and 22 April 2024 for all 21 elected seats of the Regional Council of Basilicata and the president of Basilicata, who automatically becomes a member of the council alongside the second-placed candidate. It is the final election in Italy before the 2024 European Parliament election in June 2024 and the third election of the 2024 Italian regional elections cycle (after Sardinia and Abruzzo).

After some negotiations, the centre-right coalition confirmed Vito Bardi, the incumbent president. Bardi is supported by Brothers of Italy, the League, Forza Italia–Us Moderates, the Union of the Centre–Christian Democracy, Action, and the civic lists Lucanian Pride, which includes members of Italia Viva, and True Basilicata. The centre-left coalition chose the province of Matera president Piero Marrese after long negotiations and two other candidates having withdrawn. In support of Marraese are the Democratic Party, the Five Star Movement, the Greens and Left Alliance, the Italian Socialist Party, Possible Basilicata, More Europe, Democratic Centre, and the civic lists Common House Basilicata and United Basilicata.

Other presidential candidates initially included Angelo Chiorazzo for the Common House Basilicata civic list and Pasquale Tucciariello for the Popular Area civi list. Chiorazzo had announced his independent candidacy in December 2023, then months later withdrawn it for a common candidate (Domenico Lacerenza) within the centre-left coalition and re-announced his candidacy when that failed and Lacerenza renounced, before returning to the centre-left coalition and endorsing Marrese, all in March 2023. Tucciariello also withdrew his candidacy in March 2023. Eustacchio Follia for Volt Italy was the sole other candidate remaining besides Bardi and Marrese.

== Background ==
The 2019 Basilicata regional election was won by the centre-right coalition and their presidential candidate Vito Bardi of Forza Italia, amid a divided centre-left coalition also marred by scandals. It was the centre-right coalition's first regional win in Basilicata since direct elections have been held since 1995 and the first right-wing president since the office was established in 1970. Due to the centre-left coalition's rooting in the region, Basilicata is considered Southern Italy's Emilia-Romagna. In February 2022, the Regional Council of Basilicata agreed to hold the elections on 21–22 April 2024. The 2024 election year was considered a pivotal one for Italy. Both coalitions showed dissent and disagreements. Ahead of the 2024 Sardinian regional election, the League insisted on the incumbent Christian Solinas, while Brothers of Italy pushed for Paolo Truzzu. As a result of this internal power struggle within the centre-right coalition, Bardi's re-election bid was not assured; for example, in exchange for Truzzu, the League asked for their own candidate in Basilicata. Ultimately, Truzzu was chosen as the centre-right coalition candidate in Sardinia, after Solinas and six others were charged for corruption, (Note: See "Regionali. Solinas indagato, la Lega capitola in Sardegna e accetta Truzzu di Fdi". Avvenire (in Italian). 18 January 2024.) and Bardi was confirmed as their presidential candidate for Basilicata.

On the centre-left coalition camp, there was division over its candidate. Angelo Chiorazzo had announced his independent candidacy in December 2023. He lacked the necessary support among the coalition, such as some in the Five Star Movement. A civic front opposing to Chiorazzo's candidacy was created in 2024. While deeming him an esteemed person, Giuseppe Conte raised the issue of a conflict of interests due to Chiorazzo's entrepreneurial career in health care. Similarly, the Five Star Movement's chosen candidate Domenico Lacerenza did not satisfy the whole coalition and prompted criticism. Like Chiorazzo, Lacerenza was considered an esteemed person but his lack of political experience and the way his candidacy was announced, as an improvised and last-minute choice, attracted criticism within the coalition and prompted some ophthalmology-related jokes due to Lacerenza's profession, and ultimately caused his withdrawal three days later. (Note: When initially chosen as candidate, perhaps under the suggestion of former Basilicata president Vito De Filippo, Domenico Lacerenza said that he found out about the decision that same afternoon, he never met the Democratic Party secretary Elly Schlein and the Five Star Movement president Giuseppe Conte, and accepted the decision after consulting with his family. He was chosen due to his profession, with the centre-left coalition's primary concerns being the fallen health care in Basilicata and making this a priority for their campaign. Lacerenza also allegedly said that he would continue to work part-time and do surgeries rather than campaign, being very focused on his job. Within the Democratic Party in Basilicata, many opposed Lacerenza's candidacy and pushed for Angelo Chiorazzo, started an online petition, and stated they would form the Lucianian Pride Pole if Lacerenza remained the candidate. When he renounced to his two-day candidacy, Lacerenza said that it was "a decision taken with absolute serenity and also in the interests of the political forces that wanted to propose me. I had given my availability, but I cannot fail to note the reactions that occurred subsequently." Conte blamed Lacerenza's failed candidacy on factionalism.) Additionally, Action complained of being excluded by the Five Star Movement and Conte's alleged vetoes, which in turn prompted criticism due to Action's not excluding the possibility of supporting Bardi. (Note: In March 2024, with the centre-left coalition talks still ongoing, Carlo Calenda praised Vito Bardi, saying: "I have always expressed a positive opinion on Bardi, in the sense that I think he is a moderate, a man of institutions, a cultured person, a pro-European, a liberal. As you know there has never been a prejudice. However, it is always important for us to make every attempt to bring the opposition together.") Following the failed independent campaign in Sardinia, Action leader Carlo Calenda had said that this would not happen again, and was seen as Calenda's opening to Conte for a centre-left coalition that united the opposition. After being part of the centre-left coalition in the 2024 Abruzzo regional election, Italia Viva chose to support Bardi.

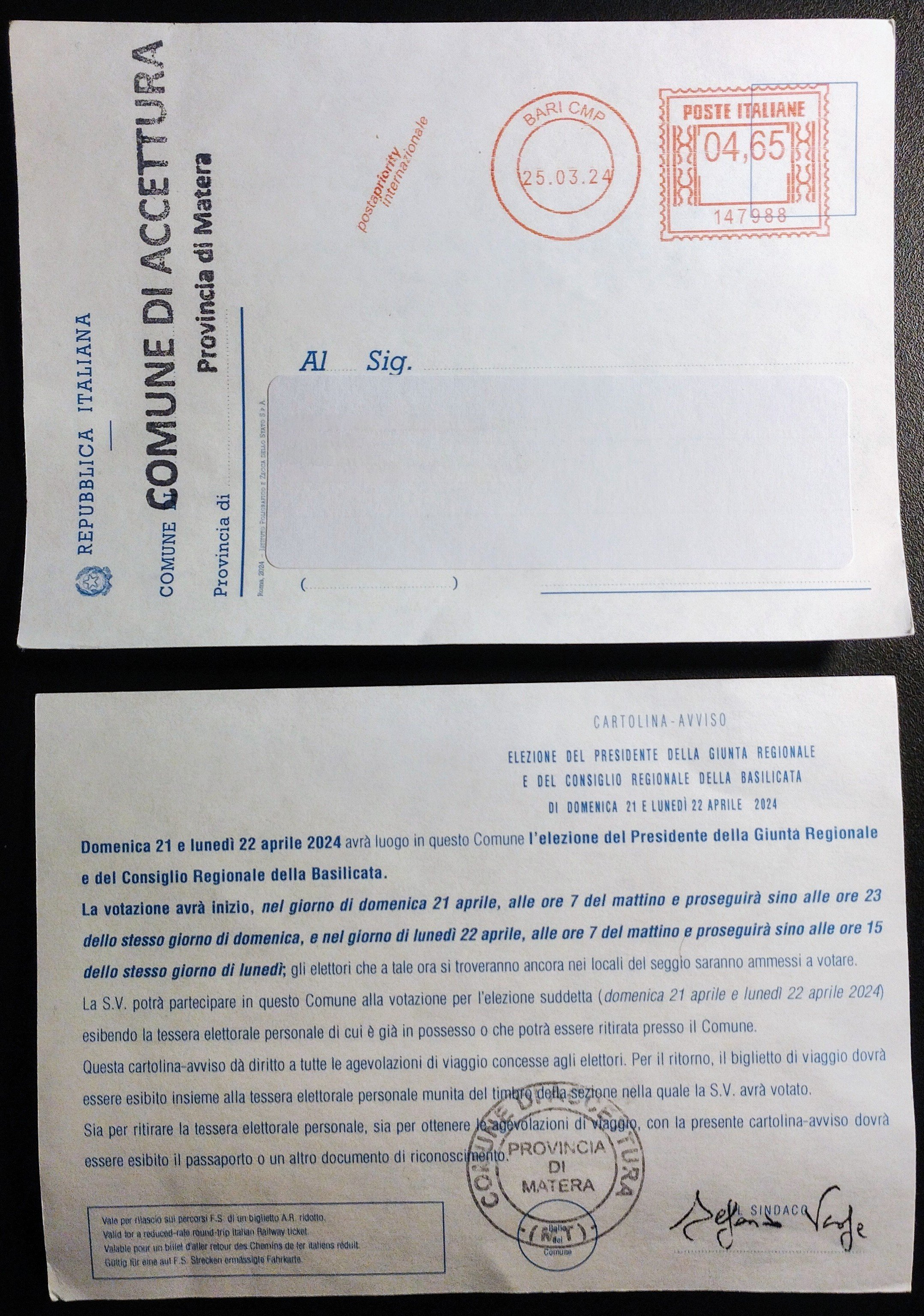
Electoral card for the regional election

Roberto Speranza was initially thought to be the unifying candidate for the centre-left coalition but he declined the offer, and instead pushed for Chiorazzo as candidate. Speranza, who was the health minister during the COVID-19 pandemic in Italy, later explained that he still received death threats from anti-vaccine activists and was put under escort, and thus felt he could not be the centre-left coalition candidate. In order to solve the stalemate, the centre-left coalition had to choose a candidate that could be supported by all parties, including Chiorazzo and the influential Pittella family, such as the brothers Gianni Pittella and Marcello Pittella, who are referred to as the Pittellas, (Note: See Rizzini, Marianna (21 January 2016). "Da Strasburgo alla Basilicata, ecco l'epopea glocal dei Pittellas". Il Foglio (in Italian).) and are considered a dynasty within the region, with Marcello Pittella compared to Jep Gambardella in The Great Beauty. This was a way to avoid their own independent campaigns that, like Renato Soru's failed attempt in Sardinia, could cost the centre-left coalition a major win going into the European Parliament elections and gain more momentum and credibility for the new broader centre-left coalition as a big tent progressive camp (campo largo, also referred to as campo larghissimo, when both the Five Star Movement and Action–Italia Viva are part of the coalition as in Abruzzo) alternative to the governing centre-right coalition for the next Italian general election. The centre-left coalition ultimately chose Piero Marrese, the province of Matera president who had been discussed and rumoured in the months prior as the unifying candidate, without the support of Action and Italia Viva, although they said they were open to further expand the coalition. When Action joined Italia Viva in supporting Bardi and the centre-right coalition, the campo largo terminology in reference to an expanded centre-left coalition came to be used for the centre-right coalition for the Basilicata election. Their choice raised some concerns on whether this definitely moved Action and Italia Viva away from the centre-left coalition.

As part of the 2024 Italian regional elections cycle, Basilicata came after those held in Sardinia and Abruzzo, each won by the centre-left coalition and the centre-right coalition, respectively. Thus, Basilicata has been compared to the U.S. state of Ohio and described as the Ohio of Italian politics, being the last regional election held before the European Parliament election, which will be held in June 2024, and in Italy on the same day as the regional election in Piedmont. The long negotiations during the candidacy selections, which caused divisions among both main coalitions, attracted national attention, were criticized, were compared to, including by local writers like Gaetano Cappelli, telenovelas and Italian comedy, with references to the 2010 Italian film Basilicata Coast to Coast rephrased as Basilicata Caos to Caos.

== Electoral system ==
The electoral law, established in 2018 for the 2019 regional election, follows proportional representation with a threshold of 3% for party lists and 4% for lists in coalitions that failed to reach the 8% threshold. If the first coalition wins 30% of the vote, the parties collectively receive 11 (55%) to 14 seats (67%). For the presidential election, a candidate needs to win by a simple majority (first-past-the-post). To cast his vote, the voter can make a single mark on the name of a presidential candidate, and in this case the vote is not transmitted to any party list. If the voter marks the symbol of one of the lists, the vote is automatically transferred to the candidate supported by that list. Since the approval of the new regional electoral law in 2018, split voting is not possible, i.e. voting on a list and a candidate who is not supported by it.

According to the Tatarella Law of 1995 still in force, in addition to the newly elected president, the candidate for president of the coalition who ranks second automatically gains one seat (the first of his coalition or single party list) in the Regional Council. The remaining 19 seats will be assigned on a province basis, proportionally with respect to the population of the provinces of Potenza and Matera. The voter can express two preferences, reserving the second to a candidate of a different sex, otherwise the second preferences will not be valid. Among the innovations, there is the introduction of gender equality (each party list cannot have more than 60% of candidates of the same sex), and the abolition of the price list and of the split vote.

== Political parties and candidates ==
Political party or alliance	Constituent lists	Previous result		Candidate
Political party or alliance	Constituent lists	Votes (%)	Seats	Candidate
Centre-right coalition	League (Lega)	19.1	6	Vito Bardi
Centre-right coalition	Forza Italia (FI) (incl. NM)	9.1	3	Vito Bardi
Centre-right coalition	Brothers of Italy (FdI)	5.9	1	Vito Bardi
Centre-right coalition	Action (Az)	—N/a	—N/a	Vito Bardi
Centre-right coalition	Union of the Centre–Christian Democracy–United Populars (UDC–DC–PU)	—N/a	—N/a	Vito Bardi
Centre-right coalition	Lucanian Pride (OL) (incl. IV)	—N/a	—N/a	Vito Bardi
Centre-right coalition	True Basilicata (VB)	—N/a	—N/a	Vito Bardi
Centre-left coalition	Five Star Movement (M5S)	20.3	3	Piero Marrese
Centre-left coalition	Democratic Party (PD)	7.7	2	Piero Marrese
Centre-left coalition	Greens and Left Alliance–Italian Socialist Party–Possible Basilicata (AVS–PSI–BP)	4.2+3.8+1.9	0	Piero Marrese
Centre-left coalition	Common House Basilicata (BCC)	—N/a	—N/a	Piero Marrese
Centre-left coalition	United Basilicata (BU) (incl. +E)	—N/a	—N/a	Piero Marrese
Volt Italy (Volt)		—N/a	—N/a	Eustachio Follia

== Campaign ==
=== Official candidates ===
On 10 October 2023, Volt Italy officially announced the candidacy of its regional coordinator Eustachio Follia, who is also a journalist. Following rumours dating back to autumn 2023, the entrepreneur Angelo Chiorazzo, who is known as "The King of the White Co-Ops", being a co-founder of the Auxilium cooperative and Christian-democratic exponent, (Note: See Mira, Antonio Maria (29 August 2023). "Intervista. Chiorazzo: 'Migranti, un errore smantellare l'accoglienza'". Avvenire (in Italian).) announced his candidacy as an independent politician in December 2023. Chiorazzo was initially supported by Common House Basilicata (the civic movement of which he was part), the Democratic Party, and Italia Viva. His candidacy received negative opinions from the Five Star Movement and Action, and his call for a primary election to determinate the presidential candidate for the centre-left coalition was also rejected, favouring instead further negotiations for a unifying candidate. On 25 February 2024, the Popular Area civic movement made official the candidacy of its national secretary Pasquale Tucciariello. On 17 March 2024, Popular Area announced Tucciarello's withdrawal from the electoral campaign.

On 28 February 2024, after a few months of negotiations and the negative result of the regional elections in Sardinia, the centre-right coalition officially announced the re-nomination of the incumbent regional president Vito Bardi for a second term. Bardi was supported by seven party lists: Brothers of Italy, the League, Forza Italia, Us Moderates, the Union of the Centre–Christian Democracy–United Populars, Action, and the civic list Lucanian Pride, which includes members of Italia Viva after the national party led by Matteo Renzi gave its support to Bardi on 16 March 2024 and joined the centre-right coalition in Basilicata. The 18 March 2024 decision of Action to follow Italia Viva and support Bardi and join the centre-right coalition, particularly within Action but also among Italia Viva because many of its local members were vocally opposed to and critical of Bardi, and because Italia Viva will not take part to the election through its symbol and name but as a civic list under another name (Lucanian Pride), was controversial and caused dissent. It also caused division among the Pittella brothers, with Gianni Pittella dissenting. Further controversy ensued that same day when Marcello Pittella, in justifying his and the party's decision to support Bardi and join the centre-right coalition in an audio message, compared the behavior of the Democratic Party and the Five Star Movement towards Action, alleging vetoes, to that of Jews during the Holocaust. He soon said that he was sorry about the comparison and apologized to anyone who felt offended by it.

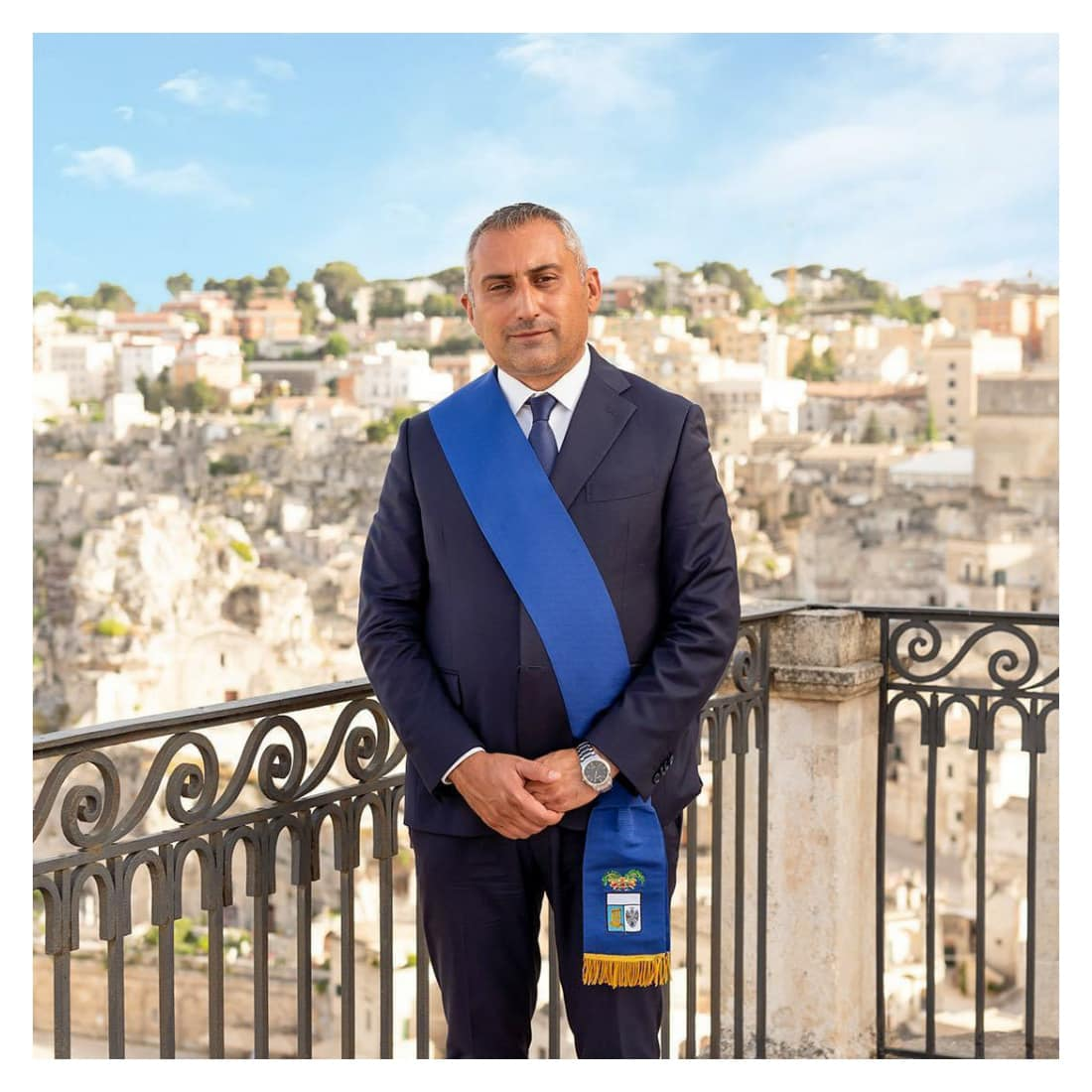
Piero Marrese, the president of the province of Matera

On 13 March 2024, after a few months of negotiations and following the results of the elections in Sardinia and Abruzzo, the Democratic Party, the Five Star Movement, the Green and Left Alliance, More Europe, and the Common House Basilicata civic list announced their support for the candidacy of Lacerenza, until then head of the ophthalmology department of the San Carlo Hospital in Potenza, and Chiorazzo's candidacy was withdrawn. On 16 March 2024, Lacerenza renounced the nomination following the negative reactions that his candidacy had sparked among some mayors, administrators, and trade unionists close to the centre-left coalition. That same day, following Lacerenza's withdrawal, Chiorazzo re-proposed his candidacy, with the support of Common House Basilicata and other civic forces. On 17 March 2024, after the possibility of supporting Chiorazzo was discarded in the previous weeks, the coalition formed by the Democratic Party, the Five Star Movement, the Green and Left Alliance, the Italian Socialist Party, More Europe, and Possible Basilicata of the 2019 left-wing candidate Valerio Tramutoli agreed to nominate Piero Marrese, the province of Matera president and mayor of Montalbano Jonico, from the Democratic Party. Although Marrese was also elected through the support of Action, Calenda stated that he did not exclude supporting Bardi, which he ultimately did.

On 19 March 2024, the Democratic Centre led by Bruno Tabacci announced their support of Marrese. On 20 March 2024, Chiorazzo again renounced to his candidacy and endorsed Marrese. During the early hours of 21 March 2023, Marrese had a car accident, without consequences. Marrese was returning home after a political reunion in Potenza. He said that everyone was fine and that he was already working to finish the lists for the election. Bardi issued a message of solidarity to Marrese and those affected. On 22 March 2024, Chiorazzo's civic list Common House Basilicata was joined by Beyond Basilicata.

The officialization of the electoral lists ended on 23 March 2024 at 12 am. The first to do so were Forza Italia and Us Moderates. Chiorazzo's list included, among others, two former members of the centre-right coalition who had been last elected in 2019 with the League but had criticized Bardi and opposed his re-election bid: Giovanni Viziello and Massimo Zullino of Beyond Basilicata. Bardi had seven lists in support (Forza Italia–Us Moderates, Brothers of Italy, League, Action, Union of the Centre–Christian Democracy–United Populars, Lucanian Pride, and True Basilicata), Marrese had five (Democratic Party, Five Star Movement, Green and Left Alliance–Italian Socialist Party–Possible Basilicata, Common House Basilicata, and United Basilicata), and Follia had one (Volt Italy). All the centre-right coalition's councillors run for re-election, as are five out of five councilors and 18 out of 20 outgoing councilors, with a total of 13 list and 258 candidates; the only two outgoing councilors who did not seek re-election were the 2019 centre-left coalition candidate Carlo Trerotola and the two-term limited (due to its internal rules) Giovanni Perrino of the Five Star Movement. Because the representatives of some political parties had only showed up at the last minute, there was a delay; the True Basilicata list for the province of Potenza was only registered at 18 pm and the same list for the province of Matera had some problems that may cause the list not to be accepted. The True Basilicata list for the province of Matera and the Volt Italy list for the province of Potenza were initially rejected; they appealed the decision. On 27 March 2024, their appeal was successful and both lists were reinstated.

=== Debates ===
In March 2024, Piero Marrese challenged Vito Bardi to a public debate. About the centre-left coalition's much discussed negotiations for a candidate, Marrese said: "Better late than Bardi."

== Opinion polls ==
An opinion poll by Sondaggi Noto from 18 to 21 March 2024 among 1,000 electors showed the incumbent Vito Bardi ahead of Piero Marrese by 11 points, 55 to 44 percent, with Eustachio Follia taking the remaining 1 percent. The margin of error, with a 95 percent confidence interval, was ±3,2 percent. The estimated turnout was between 50 and 54 percent; the poll did not ask about the political party preferences. On notability, the poll showed that 99 percent of the voters knew Bardi, compared to the 74 percent who said the same for Marrese. Bardi had a 49 percent approval rating, compared to Marrese's 35 percent.

Date	Polling firm	Bardi	Marrese	Follia	Lead
3 Apr 2024	Tecnè	54.0	44.0	2.0	10
2–3 Apr 2024	Ipsos	49.6	48.5	1.9	1.1
31 Mar 2024	Winpoll	51.5	46.4	2.1	5.1
27–28 Mar 2024	BiDiMedia	53.3	45.5	1.2	7.8
18–21 Mar 2024	Noto	55.0	44.0	1.0	11

=== Political parties ===
Date	Polling firm	Centre-right							Centre-left					Volt	Lead
Date	Polling firm	FdI	FI	Lega	Action	IV	UdC	VB	PD	BCC	M5S	AVS	+E	Volt	Lead
3 Apr 2024	Tecnè	17.0	17.0	5.0	6.0	4.0	2.0	3.0	15.0	9.0	11.0	6.0	3.0	2.0	Tie
2–3 Apr 2024	Ipsos	20.1	12.5	5.3	4.1	1.9	1.1	3.6	18.0	6.6	16.0	6.0	2.0	2.8	2.1
31 Mar 2024	Winpoll	18.7	11.6	5.7	6.0	4.4	1.2	3.5	16.3	6.0	15.9	5.4	3.3	2.0	2.4
27–28 Mar 2024	BiDiMedia	19.8	12.1	8.6	6.4	4.4	2.0	1.3	14.2	10.6	9.8	6.7	3.2	1.0	5.6

=== Approval ratings ===
Approval ratings of Vito Bardi oscillated during his presidency, from as low as 73 percent of disapproval (including undecided) to as high as 54.9 percent of approval. In 2021, he was considered the least popular president of a region. In 2023, he recovered some popularity, raising to 14th place from 40.5 percent to 47.5 percent in July 2023, and coming to being the fifth most popular regional president by December 2023.

Vito Bardi
Date	Polling firm	Approve	Disapprove	Undecided
2–3 Apr 2024	Ipsos	33	58	6
27–28 Mar 2024	BiDiMedia	39	44	7
8–13 Dec 2023	Lab2101	54.9	45.1	
Aug 2023	Lab2101	54.9	45.1	
Jul 2023	Noto	47.5	52.5	
May 2023	SWG	33	67	
10–23 Aug 2022	Lab2101	51.3	48.7	
Jul 2022	Noto	40.5	59.5	
May 2022	SWG	27	73	
Jul 2021	Noto	39	61	

Piero Marrese
Date	Polling firm	Approve	Disapprove	Undecided
2–3 Apr 2024	Ipsos	40	42	18
27–28 Mar 2024	BiDiMedia	44	49	7

Eustachio Follia
Date	Polling firm	Approve	Disapprove	Undecided
2–3 Apr 2024	Ipsos	22	52	26
27–28 Mar 2024	BiDiMedia	19	54	28

== Results ==
21–22 April 2024 Basilicata regional election results
Candidates	Votes	%	Seats	Parties	Votes	%	Seats
Vito Bardi	153,088	56.63	1	Brothers of Italy	45,458	17.39	4
Vito Bardi	153,088	56.63	1	Forza Italia	34,018	13.01	3
Vito Bardi	153,088	56.63	1	League	20,430	7.81	2
Vito Bardi	153,088	56.63	1	Action	19,646	7.51	2
Vito Bardi	153,088	56.63	1	Lucanian Pride (incl. IV)	18,371	7.03	1
Vito Bardi	153,088	56.63	1	Union of the Centre–DC–PU	6,636	2.54	–
Vito Bardi	153,088	56.63	1	True Basilicata	5,822	2.23	–
Vito Bardi	153,088	56.63	1	Total	150,381	57.52	12
Piero Marrese	113,979	42.16	1	Democratic Party	36,254	13.87	2
Piero Marrese	113,979	42.16	1	Common House Basilicata	29,228	11.88	2
Piero Marrese	113,979	42.16	1	Five Star Movement	20,026	7.66	2
Piero Marrese	113,979	42.16	1	Greens and Left Alliance–PSI–Possible Basilicata	15,144	5.79	1
Piero Marrese	113,979	42.16	1	United Basilicata	7,483	2.87	–
Piero Marrese	113,979	42.16	1	Total	108,135	41.36	7
Eustachio Follia	3,269	1.21	–	Volt Italy	2,947	1.13	–
Invalid votes	18,197	–					
Total candidates	270,336	100.00	2	Total parties	261,463	100.00	19
Registered voters	567,939	49.81					
Source: Ministry of the Interior – Results

Popular vote
FdI	17.39%
PD	13.87%
FI	13.01%
BCC	11.18%
Lega	7.81%
M5S	7.66%
Az	7.51%
OL	7.03%
AVS–PSI–BP	5.79%
BU	2.86%
UDC–DC–PU	2.54%
VB	2.23%
Volt	1.13%

President
Bardi	56.63%
Marrese	42.16%
Follia	1.21%

=== Voter turnout ===
Region	Time			
Region	21 Apr			22 Apr
Region	12:00	19:00	23:00	15:00
Basilicata	9.12%	27.37%	37.74%	49.81%
Province	Time			
Province	21 Apr			22 Apr
Province	12:00	19:00	23:00	15:00
Matera	9.74%	29.11%	40.98%	54.08%
Potenza	8.84%	26.61%	36.31%	47.93%
Fuente: Ministry of the Interior – Turnout

=== Results by province and capital city ===
Province	Piero Marrese	Vito Bardi	Eustachio Follia
Potenza	69,183 38.30%	109,957 60.87%	1,489 0.82%
Matera	44,796 49.94%	43,131 48.08%	1,780 1.98%

City	Piero Marrese	Vito Bardi	Eustachio Follia
Potenza	13,574 39.18%	20,537 59.28%	532 1.54%
Matera	15,487 57.52%	10,054 37.34%	1,385 5.14%

== See also ==
- 2024 European Parliament election in Italy
- 2024 Piedmontese regional election
