= Romualdo Coviello =

Italian politician (1940–2022)

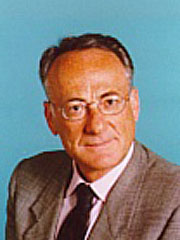
- Coviello in 2005

Member of the Senate of the Republic of Italy
- In office 2 July 1987 – 27 April 2006
- Constituency: Basilicata

President of the Regional Council of Basilicata
- In office 29 July 1980 – 8 August 1980
- Preceded by: Vincenzo Verrastro
- Succeeded by: Giuseppe Guarino
- In office 18 June 1985 – 18 May 1987
- Preceded by: Giuseppe Guarino
- Succeeded by: Mario Di Nubila

Member of the Regional Council of Basilicata
- In office 1970–1990

Personal details
- Born: 8 May 1940 Avigliano, Province of Potenza, Kingdom of Italy
- Died: 21 January 2022 (aged 81) Rome, Italy
- Party: DC; PPI; DL

Romualdo Coviello (8 May 1940 – 21 January 2022) was an Italian politician. A member of the Christian Democracy party, the Italian People's Party, and lastly Democracy is Freedom – The Daisy, he served in the Senate of the Republic from 1987 to 2006. He died in Rome on 21 January 2022, at the age of 81.

== Biography ==
Born on May 8, 1940, in Avigliano, in the province of Potenza, but residing in Potenza, he earned a degree in economics and business from the University of Rome “La Sapienza”, with a specialization in regional development economics. Romualdo Coviello was a professor of agricultural economics and policy at the University of Basilicata and head of the National Council for Agricultural Research and Experimentation.

For years, he conducted scientific research in the field of agricultural economics at the University of Basilicata and University of Bari.

After entering politics, he served as a regional councilor for Basilicata from the very first term, as president of the Regional Council, and as regional councilor for agriculture and economic planning for the Basilicata Region. He also served as deputy head of the National Committee for Agricultural Development and as a professor of agricultural economics and policy at the University of Bari.

In the 1987 general election, he ran for the Senate of the Republic (Italy) on the Christian Democratic Party (DC) ticket in the Corleto Perticara constituency of the Basilicata electoral district and was elected to the Senate. During the 10th Legislature, he served on the 5th Budget Committee and was a member and secretary of the Committee for Oversight of Development Projects in Southern Italy.

In 1994, following the dissolution of the Christian Democrats (DC), he joined the revived Italian People's Party (1994) (PPI) led by Mino Martinazzoli, and in the general election that same year, he was elected to the Senate for the third time on one of the party’s slates in the Basilicata district.

He was reelected to the Senate during the 13th and 14th legislatures, where he also served as vice chair of the Committee on Labor and Social Security, chair of the Senate Committee on Budget and Economic Planning, and chair of the Committee on European Affairs. As vice chair of the Italian Group of the Inter-Parliamentary Union (IPU) from 2001 to 2006, he participated in IPU missions abroad and in the work of WTO and UN committees. Since 2004, he has also served as an advisor to SVIMEZ.

Starting in March 2011, he served as a member of the Scientific Council of INRAN, the National Research Institute for Food and Nutrition.

He died on January 21, 2022, in Rome, at the age of 81.
