= 2000 Basilicata regional election =

7th election of the Regional Council and president of Basilicata

- 16 April 2000

All 30 seats to the Regional Council of Basilicata
- Turnout: 72.66% (▼5.93%)
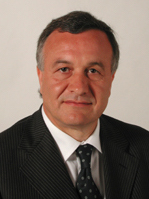

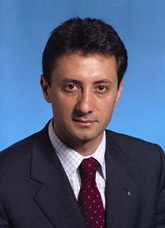
	Majority party	Minority party
Leader	Filippo Bubbico	Nicola Pagliuca
Party	DS	Forza Italia
Alliance	The Olive Tree	Pole for Freedoms
Seats won	21	9
Seat change	▲1	▼1
Popular vote	227,919	126,530
Percentage	63.2%	35.1%
Swing	▲1.9% (Note: The swing comes from the combined result of The Olive Tree (54.9%) and the Communist Refoundation Party (6.4%) in the 1995 Basilicata regional election)	▼1.4%
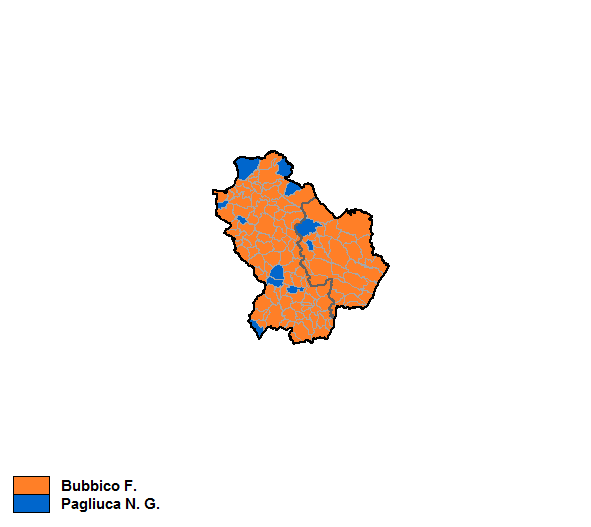
President before election
Angelo Raffaele Dinardo
PPI
President-elect
Filippo Bubbico
DS

The 2000 Basilicata regional election took place on 16 April 2000. The election was for all 30 seats of the Regional Council of Basilicata and the president of Basilicata, who automatically became a member of the council alongside two other seats, plus that of the second-placed candidate. It was the third-last election of the 2000 Italian regional elections. Filippo Bubbico of the Democrats of the Left was elected president, defeating Nicola Pagliuca of Forza Italia by a landslide. As part of what became an over 20-year rule of the centre-left coalition, the results in Basilicata reflected their comparison as the political equivalent of the left-wing Emilia-Romagna region in Southern Italy.

== Results ==
Candidates and parties	Votes	Votes (%)	Seats regional list	Seats provincial lists
Filippo Bubbico	227,919	63.16	3	18
Democrats of the Left	60,885	17.42	→	4
Italian People's Party	60,833	17.41	→	4
The Democrats	26,583	7.61	→	2
Union of Democrats for Europe	25,711	7.36	→	2
Italian Democratic Socialists	22,667	6.49	→	2
Federation of the Greens	16,555	4.74	→	1
Communist Refoundation Party	12,394	3.55	→	1
Italian Renewal	11,544	3.30	→	1
Party of Italian Communists	6,488	1.86	→	1
Nicola Pagliuca	126,530	35.07	1	8
Forza Italia	46,113	13.20	→	4
Christian Democratic Centre	23,449	6.71	→	3
National Alliance	21,115	6.04	→	1
Tricolour Flame	4,398	1.26	→	0
The Liberals Sgarbi – Socialist Party	3,583	1.03	→	0
United Christian Democrats	3,403	0.97	→	0
Bonaventura Postiglione	3,465	0.96	-	-
New Project	2,348	0.67	→	0
Maurizio Bolognetti	2,924	0.81	-	-
Bonino List	1,351	0.39	→	0
Total	360,838	100.00	4	26

Source: Ministry of the Interior
