= Filippo Bubbico =

Italian politician and architect (born 1954)

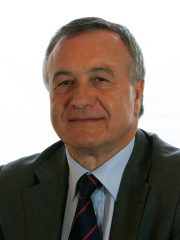

President of Basilicata
- In office 13 May 2000 – 6 May 2005
- Preceded by: Angelo Raffaele Dinardo
- Succeeded by: Vito De Filippo

Member of the Senate of the Republic
- In office 28 April 2006 – 5 October 2006
- In office 29 April 2008 – 22 March 2018

President of the Regional Council of Basilicata
- In office 7 June 2005 – 7 June 2006
- Preceded by: Vito De Filippo
- Succeeded by: Maria Antezza

Personal details
- Born: 26 February 1954 (age 72) Montescaglioso, Italy
- Party: PCI (till 1991); PDS (1991–1998); DS (1998–2007); PD (2007–2017); Art1 (2017–2023)
- Education: University of Rome La Sapienza
- Occupation: Architect, Politician

Filippo Bubbico (born 26 February 1954) is an Italian politician and the president of Basilicata from 2000 to 2005.

== Early life and education ==
Bubbico was born in Montescaglioso, in the province of Matera. He graduated with a degree in architecture in 1979 at the University of Rome La Sapienza.

== Career ==
Bubbico joined the Italian Communist Party, with which he held the office of mayor of his hometown Montescaglioso from 1980 to 1985. In 1985, Bubbico entered for the first time in the Regional Council of Basilicata and in 1987 he became provincial secretary of the Italian Communist Party in Matera. He later joined the Democratic Party of the Left and then the Democrats of the Left.

At the regional elections in Basilicata in 2000 Bubbico candidates for the Presidency of Basilicata at the head of a centre-left coalition of The Olive Tree. Bubbico was elected President with 63% of the votes. He remained in office until 2005, when he was succeeded by Vito De Filippo.

At the 2006 general election, Bubbico is elected Senator, supported by The Union coalition, leaving the office once he is appointed Undersecretary to the Ministry of Economic Development, under the guidance of Pier Luigi Bersani, in the Prodi II Cabinet.

Bubbico is re-elected Senator at the 2008 election and the 2013 election with the Democratic Party. From 2013 to 2017, Bubbico has been appointed Deputy Minister of the Ministry of the Interior in the Letta, Renzi and Gentiloni cabinets.

Bubbico ran for a seat in the Chamber of Deputies at the 2018 election with Free and Equal, but failed the election.
