= 1995 Basilicata regional election =

6th election of the Regional Council and president of Basilicata

← 1990	23 April 1995	2000 →

All 30 seats to the Regional Council of Basilicata
- Turnout: 78.59% (▼6.36%)
	Majority party	Minority party
Leader	Raffaele Dinardo	Giampiero Perri
Party	Populars	Forza Italia
Alliance	Centre-left	Centre-right
Seats won	18	10
Popular vote	190,744	126,804
Percentage	54.9%	36.5%
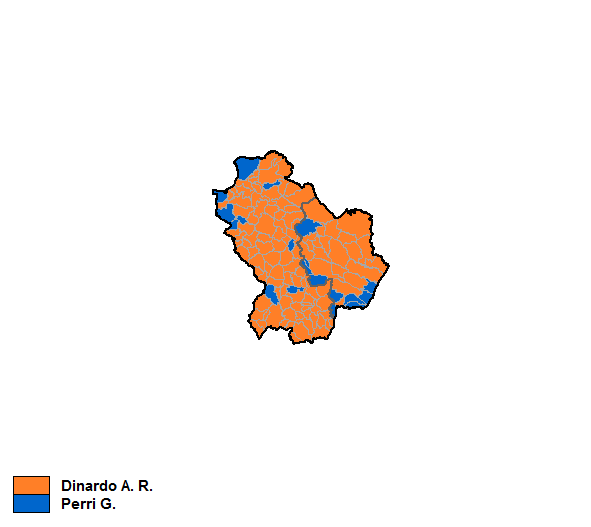
President before election
Antonio Boccia
PPI
President-elect
Raffaele Dinardo
PPI

The 1995 Basilicata regional election took place on 23 April 1995. The election was for all 30 seats of the Regional Council of Basilicata and the president of Basilicata, who automatically became a member of the council alongside two other seats, plus that of the second-placed candidate. It was the third-last election of the 1995 Italian regional elections. For the first time, the president of the region was directly elected by the people, although the election was not yet binding and the president-elect could have been replaced during the term. Raffaele Dinardo of the Populars was elected president of the region, defeating Giampiero Perri of Forza Italia by a landslide. The sole Southern Italy region that year to be governed by the centre-left coalition, it was the start of what became a over 20-year rule that led political comparisons of Basilicata to the left-wing Emilia-Romagna region.

== Results ==
Candidates	Votes	Votes (%)	Seats regional list	Seats provincial lists
Raffaele Dinardo	190,744	54.91	3	15
Democratic Party of the Left	70,111	21.80	→	6
Populars	51,885	16.13	→	4
Labour Federation	25,892	8.05	→	2
The Democrats	17,639	5.48	→	1
Pact of Democrats	16,393	5.10	→	1
Federation of the Greens	8,333	2.59	→	1
Giampiero Perri	126,804	36.50	-	10
Forza Italia – The People's Pole	55,193	17.16	→	5
National Alliance	38,738	12.04	→	4
Christian Democratic Centre	16,635	5.17	→	1
Pietro Simonetti	22,361	6.44	-	2
Communist Refoundation Party	17,144	5.33	→	2
Leonardo Giordano	4,504	1.30	-	-
Tricolour Flame	1,814	0.56	→	-
Giannino Cusano	2,994	0.86	-	-
Pannella List	1,900	0.59	→	-
Total	347,407	100.00	3	27

Source: Ministry of the Interior
