= 2010 Basilicata regional election =

9th election of the Regional Council and president of Basilicata

← 2005	28–29 March 2010	2013 →

All 31 seats to the Regional Council of Basilicata
- Turnout: 62.81% (▼4.35%)
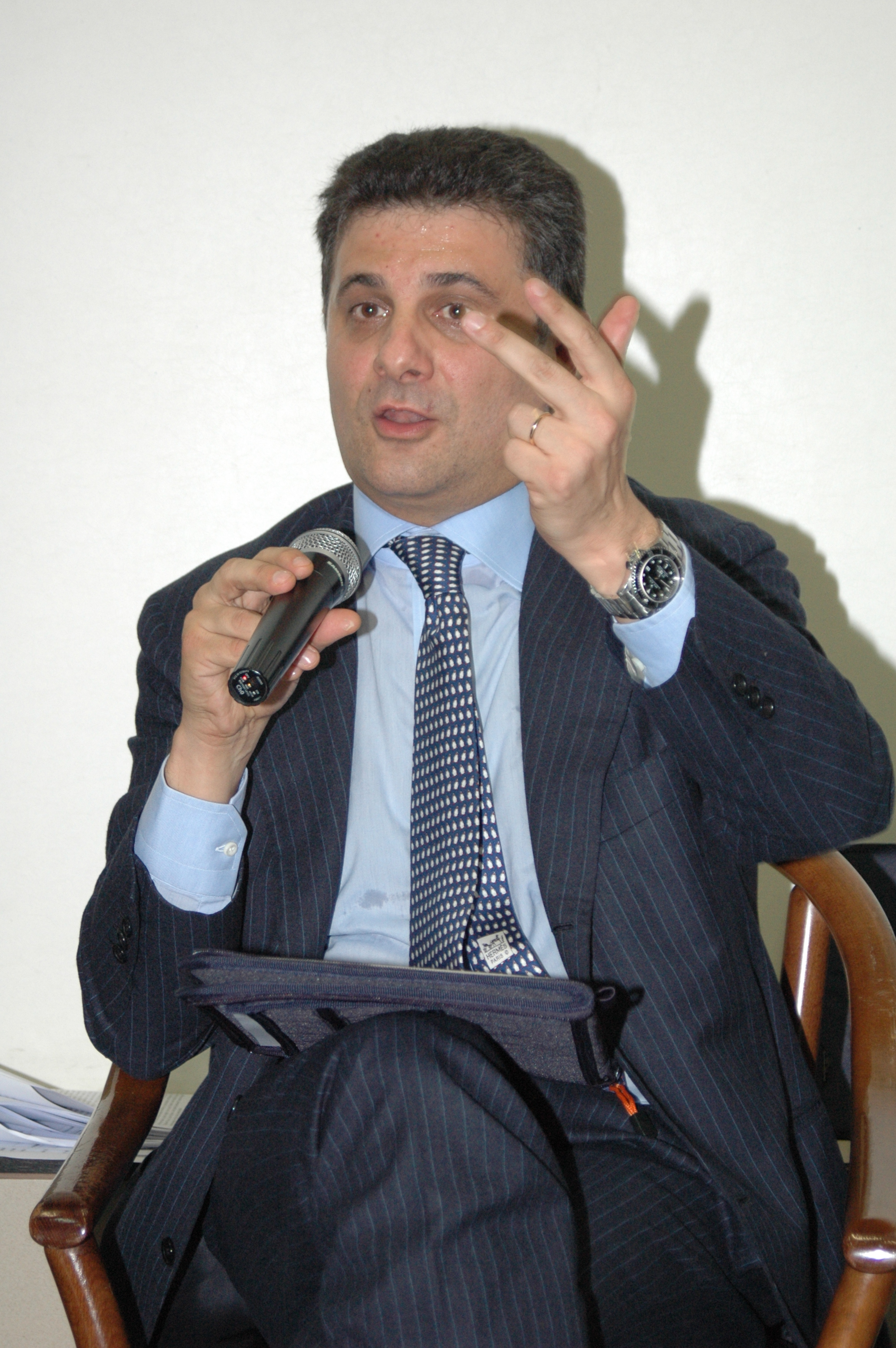

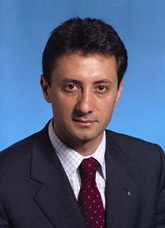
	Majority party	Minority party
Leader	Vito De Filippo	Nicola Pagliuca
Party	Democratic Party	People of Freedom
Alliance	Centre-left	Centre-right
Seats won	19	10
Seat change	▼1	Steady
Popular vote	202,980	93,204
Percentage	60.8%	27.9%
Swing	▼6.2%	▼0.9%
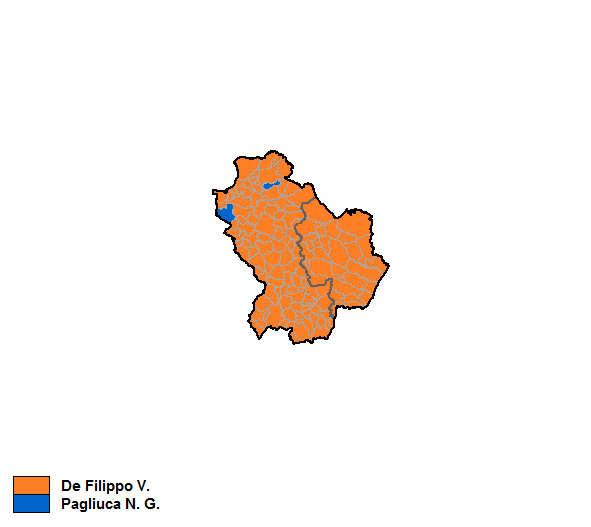
President before election
Vito De Filippo
Democratic Party
President-elect
Vito De Filippo
Democratic Party

The 2010 Basilicata regional election took place on 28–29 March 2010. The election was for all 31 seats of the Regional Council of Basilicata and the president of Basilicata, who automatically became a member of the council alongside the second-placed candidate. It was the third-last election of the 2010 Italian regional elections. The incumbent president, Vito De Filippo of the Democratic Party, was elected for a second-consecutive term by a landslide, thus becoming the most voted candidate in the 2010 regional elections. As part of what became a over 20-year rule of the centre-left coalition, the results in Basilicata confirmed their comparison as the political equivalent of the left-wing Emilia-Romagna region in Southern Italy.

== Results ==
28 March 2010 Basilicata regional election results
Candidates	Votes	%	Seats	Parties	Votes	%	Seats
Vito De Filippo	202,980	60.82	3	Democratic Party	87,134	27.14	7
Vito De Filippo	202,980	60.82	3	Italy of Values	31,902	9.94	3
Vito De Filippo	202,980	60.82	3	Union of the Centre	23,760	7.40	2
Vito De Filippo	202,980	60.82	3	United Populars	19,045	5.93	1
Vito De Filippo	202,980	60.82	3	Italian Socialist Party	14,919	4.65	1
Vito De Filippo	202,980	60.82	3	Alliance for Italy	13,624	4.24	1
Vito De Filippo	202,980	60.82	3	Left Ecology Freedom	12,818	3.99	1
Vito De Filippo	202,980	60.82	3	Federation of the Left	6,904	2.15	–
Vito De Filippo	202,980	60.82	3	Federation of the Greens	6,839	2.13	–
Vito De Filippo	202,980	60.82	3	Total	216,945	67.56	16
Nicola Pagliuca	93,204	27.93	1	The People of Freedom	62,420	19.44	7
Nicola Pagliuca	93,204	27.93	1	List for Pagliuca (incl. PLI – UDEUR)	13,913	4.33	1
Nicola Pagliuca	93,204	27.93	1	Movement for the Autonomies	8,516	2.65	1
Nicola Pagliuca	93,204	27.93	1	Autonomous Entrepreneurs Movement – Lucan Autonomy	2,644	0.82	–
Nicola Pagliuca	93,204	27.93	1	Total	87,493	27.25	8
Magdi Allam	29,107	8.72	–	I Love Lucania	11,980	3.73	1
Magdi Allam	29,107	8.72	–	I the South	1,720	0.54	–
Magdi Allam	29,107	8.72	–	Total	13,700	4.27	1
Marco Toscano	4,936	1.48	–	Political Movement Against Indifference	2,262	0.70	–
Florenzo Doino	3,512	1.05	–	Workers' Communist Party	698	0.22	–
Total candidates	333,739	100.00	4	Total parties	321.098	100.00	26
Registered voters	569.365	62.81					
Source: Ministry of the Interior – Results

Popular vote
PD	27.14%
PdL	19.44%
IdV	9.94%
UdC	7.40%
PU	5.93%
PSI	4.65%
Pagliuca List	4.33%
ApI	4.24%
SEL	3.99%
IAI	3.73%
MpA	2.65%
FdS	2.15%
FdV	2.13%
Others	2.28%

President
De Filippo	60.82%
Pagliuca	27.93%
Allam	8.72%
Toscano	1.48%
Doino	1.05%

=== Voter turnout ===
Region	Turnout
Basilicata	62.81%
Province	Turnout
Matera	68.37%
Potenza	60.28%
