= Marcello Pittella =

Italian politician (born 1962)

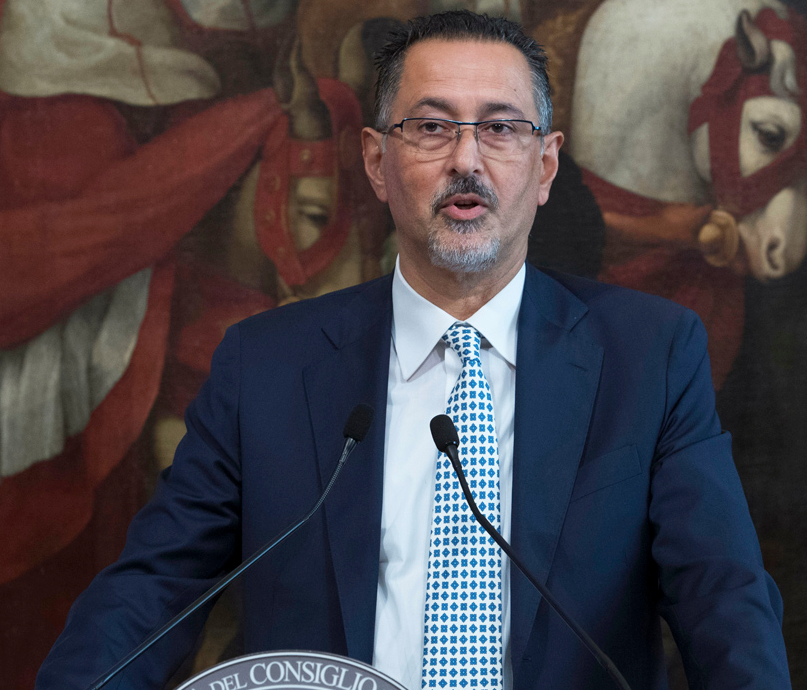

President of the Regional Council of Basilicata
- Incumbent
- Assumed office 5 July 2024
- Preceded by: Carmine Cicala

Member of the Regional Council of Basilicata
- Incumbent
- Assumed office 6 May 2019
- In office 12 May 2005 – 20 December 2013

President of Basilicata
- In office 18 December 2013 – 24 January 2019
- Preceded by: Vito De Filippo
- Succeeded by: Vito Bardi

Personal details
- Born: Maurizio Marcello Claudio Pittella; 4 February 1962 (age 64) Lauria, Province of Potenza, Italy
- Party: PSI (until 1994); FL (1994–1998); DS (1998–2007); PD (2007–2022); Action (since 2022)
- Other political affiliations: TRP (since 2016); RI (since 2019)
- Parent(s): Domenico Pittella (father); Laurita (mother)
- Relatives: Gianni Pittella (brother)
- Education: University of Naples Federico II
- Occupation: Surgeon, politician

Marcello Pittella (born 4 June 1962) is an Italian politician who served as president of Basilicata from 2013 to 2019. Like his father and older brother, Pittella began his political career in the Italian Socialist Party. He and his brother later joined the Labour Federation and the Democrats of the Left within the centre-left coalition, at that time known as The Olive Tree. In 2007, the Pittellas were among the founding members of the Democratic Party.

As a member of the Democratic Party, Pittella was elected president of Basilicata, becoming one of the most popular and controversial politicians of the Italian region, as a result of which he was not the centre-left coalition leading candidate in 2019, even though he was independently re-elected within the same coalition to the Regional Council of Basilicata and proved to be the most vote politician. During his time as regional councillor, he was a member of the Transnational Radical Party and the Italian Radicals, which he had respectively joined in 2016 and 2019.

In 2022, Pittella left the Democratic Party after not being selected among the candidates for the snap election and joined the Action party, without being elected to the Italian Parliament. In 2024, in dissent with his brother, Pittella switched his support to the centre-right coalition led by the regional president Vito Bardi, which proved decisive for Bardi's re-election.

== Early life and family ==
Pittella was born on 4 June 1962 in Lauria, a small town of the Southern Italian region Basilicata. He graduated at the University of Naples Federico II's Faculty of Medicine and Surgery. A member of the influential Pittella family, his father Domenico and brother Gianni were also politicians, all of them being members of the Italian Socialist Party, with his father serving as a member of the Senate of the Republic from 1972 to 1983. Referred to as the Pittellas, they are considered a dynasty within the region, with Pittella compared to Jep Gambardella in The Great Beauty. In his youth, Pittella was involved in sports, particularly volleyball, and became a sports manager.

== Political career ==
Pittella's first administrative commitment was as municipal councilor of Lauria was in 1993. He held the office of alderman for Productive Activities and Sports. Pittella then joined the Labour Federation, and in 1995 successfully ran as a councilor for the province of Potenza. After joining the Democrats of the Left, of which he was the regional leader, he was re-elected in 1999 and became president of the council. He was also the mayor of Lauria from 2001 to 2005. In the 2005 Basilicata regional election, Pittella was elected to the Basilicata Regional Council. He joined the Democratic Party in 2007 and was re-elected in the 2010 Basilicata regional election. Pittella joined the regional government in 2012 as assessor to productive activity. He was the vice-president from April 2013 to September 2013. In the 2013 Basilicata regional election, he succeeded Vito De Filippo, being elected president of Basilicata.

In January 2015, due to the illicit repayments obtained between 2009 and 2010, Pitella was sentenced by the Court of Accounts of Potenza to "compensate the damage produced to the Basilicata Region" for the amount of €6,319.84. On 6 July 2018, he ended up under house arrest as a result of an investigation by the Guardia di Finanza regarding alleged rigged competitions and piloted appointments in the Lucanian health service; he was suspended from the office of president pending final judgment as result of the Severino Law. On 24 September 2018, he was released but the Guardia di Finanza ordered the interdiction of residence in Potenza that was revoked by the preliminary hearing judge on 30 January 2019, following his resignation as president presented on 24 January 2019.

In the 2019 Basilicata regional election, Pittella was a divisive figure within the centre-left coalition due to the 2018 investigation, and was replaced by Carlo Trerotola. Despite this, Pittella was re-elected regional councillor among the ranks of the civic list Forward Basilicata, which garnered more votes than the Democratic Party, with Pittella remaining the most voted politician. On 22 December 2021, the Court of Matera acquitted him of all charges and rejected the request for three years in prison presented by the public prosecutor as part of what came to be known as the Sanitopoli lucana scandal, while seven managers of healthcare companies had instead been sentenced to sentences between two and five years. Pittella said: "These have been difficult, hard years. I was a front-page monster. But I always had the faith that time could reveal the truth." On 1 March 2024, the Potenza Court of Appeal confirmed the acquittal of Pittella.

In 2022, Pittella, followed by his brother, left the Democratic Party after not being listed as a candidate for the 2022 Italian general election and joined the Action party led by former Democratic Party member Carlo Calenda. Placed at the top of Action's list for the Senate of the Republic in the proportional quota in Basilicata, he was not elected. For the 2024 Basilicata regional election, after division and dissent within the centre-left coalition, he joined the centre-right coalition in support of the incumbent president Vito Bardi, despite having been at the opposition, which caused dissent with his brother. In justifying his and the party's decision to support Bardi and join the centre-right coalition in an audio message, Pittella compared the behavior of the Democratic Party and the Five Star Movement towards Action, alleging vetoes, to that of Jews during the Holocaust. He soon said that he was sorry about the comparison and apologized to anyone who felt offended by it. In his written statement announcing Action's support for Bardi, alongside the Action Basilicata regional secretary Donato Pessolano, Pittella wrote that they shared "elements of his program on which to build an agreement", in particular the "relaunch of health and welfare, a reorganization and implementation of regional governance, the identification of strategies for development", which also evaluate the establishment of a sovereign fund against depopulation, "a strategy for culture that sees Matera as a beacon", and a fight against precarious employment, with a particular focus "in favour of agriculture and aiming for a high-performance governance of forestation".

Pittella's support proved decisive to Bardi's successful re-election. Pittella was re-elected as councilor, obtaining around 7,000 votes and becoming the second most voted candidate. On 5 July, he was elected president of the Regional Council of Basilicata. Ahead of the 2024 European Parliament election in Italy, he placed first in his constituency with around 32,000 votes but was not elected due to the Action party list not reaching the 4 percent electoral threshold. He was Action's leading candidate in the Southern Italy constituency.

== Personal life ==
Pittella is married and has three children. In addition to his politics career, he is a surgeon. In the 1980s, he played volleyball. In 2016, Pittella joined the Transnational Radical Party founded by Marco Pannella. In 2019, as a member of Basilicata's regional council, he joined the Lucanian Radicals (the local branch of the Italian Radicals) and the Radical Lucanians Association (ARL).
