= Vito Bardi =

Italian politician (born 1951)

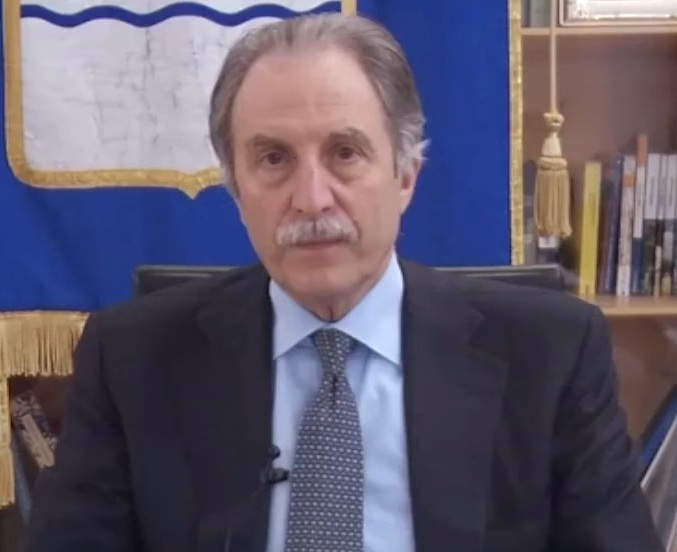
- Bardi in 2020

President of Basilicata
- Incumbent
- Assumed office 16 April 2019
- Preceded by: Marcello Pittella

Personal details
- Born: 18 September 1951 (age 75) Potenza, Italy
- Party: Forza Italia (since 2019)
- Spouse: Gisella Pischedda (married c. 1984)
- Children: 2
- Occupation: General of the Guardia di Finanza, politician

Vito Bardi (born 18 September 1951) is an Italian general and politician. He is serving as the 9th and incumbent president of Basilicata since 16 April 2019. Bardi joined the Guardia di Finanza in 1970. He was promoted colonel on 31 December 1995 and later army corps general in 2009. He served as deputy general commander of the Guardia di Finanza from 5 September 2013 to 4 September 2014.

== Early life and education ==
Bardi was born in Potenza, in the Basilicata region; he grew up in Filiano, in the province of Potenza. Bardi attended the Nunziatella Military School in Naples, in the Campania region, where he obtained a liceo classico diploma and later came to hold several degrees. During his life, Bardi graduated four times: in Economy, in Law, in International and Diplomatic Sciences, and in Economic and Financial Security Sciences.

== Career ==
Bardi served in the Guardia di Finanza as an officer. Promoted to colonel on 31 December 1995, he commanded the Legion of Florence and was placed in charge of the 1st Department of the General Command, a position he held until 1 January 2001, when he was promoted to brigadier general. He was appointed division general on 1 January 2005, and was assigned as regional commander of Campania. As army corps general, a rank achieved on 6 February 2009, Bardi held the positions of interregional commander of Southern Italy and inspector of educational institutions. He was the deputy general commander of the Guardia di Finanza from 5 September 2013 until 4 September 2014, when he retired. That same year, he was investigated of corruption; he rejected the accusations and declared himself innocent. He was acquitted in 2017.

For the 2019 Basilicata regional election, Bardi was appointed by Silvio Berlusconi as the centre-right coalition candidate for the office of president of Basilicata, supported by Forza Italia, the League, and Brothers of Italy. Initially a political independent, Bardi officially joined Forza Italia for the election; he had ties to Berlusconi since 2009, and was the first high-ranking official who learned of the Patrizia D'Addario affair. Bardi managed to win the election with 42.2 percent of the votes, ahead of Carlo Trerotola (centre-left coalition) at 33.1 percent, Antonio Mattia (Five Star Movement) at 20.2 percent, and the left-wing candidate Valerio Tramutoli (Possible) at 4.3 percent. In doing so, he became the first right-wing president of Basilicata in 49 years and after 24 uninterrupted years of centre-left coalition leadership; due to the centre-left coalition's roots in the region, Basilicata has been described as the political equivalent of the left-wing Emilia-Romagna region in Southern Italy. Bardi did not vote because he resides in Naples. He campaigned on legality, and pledged to prioritize jobs opportunities and improving the infrastructures.

Approval ratings of Bardi oscillated during his presidency, from as low as 73 percent of disapproval (including undecided) to as high as 54.9 percent of approval. In 2021, he was considered the least popular president of a region. In 2022, Bardi was involved in two investigations related to the centre-right coalition. One was related to bad politics, with charges ranging from corruption and attempted extortion to abuse of office, embezzlement, and influence peddling. The other was related to a broader investigation, which started in 2018 and prompted Bardi's predecessor Marcello Pittella's resignation and included hundreds of people, later reduced to 27, as part of the region's health care inquiry about its mismanagement, with Bardi charged of attempted undue inducement. In 2023, Bardi recovered some popularity, raising to 14th place from 40.5 percent to 47.5 percent in July 2023, and coming to being the fifth most popular regional president by December 2023.

After some negotiations, in which the centre-right coalition appeared divided and his re-election bid seemed uncertain, Bardi was confirmed as the centre-right coalition candidate for the 2024 Basilicata regional election. In addition to Forza Italia, the League, and Brothers of Italy, the centre-right coalition in support of Bardi also included Us Moderates, the Union of the Centre–Christian Democracy, and former centre-left coalition split parties Action and Italia Viva, forming a broader big tent (campo largo) that since the 2022 Italian general election had been associated with the centre-left coalition. Bardi's challengers include the province of Matera president Piero Marrese for the centre-left coalition and Eustacchio Follia for Volt Italy, with Bardi considered the frontrunner.

== Personal life ==
At the time of his election to president of Basilicata in 2019, Bardi had been married for over 35 years to Gisella Pischedda; together, they have two adult sons, Andrea and Luca. Bardi, who lives in Naples, is a supporter of the football club SSC Napoli.

== Works ==
- Bardi, Vito (2003). I provvedimenti per la gestione del personale nella Guardia di finanza: tutela della legalità e profili contenzios (in Italian). OCLC 956023578.
- Bardi, Vito (2005). La tutela giustiziale: da appunti di esperienze militari, casi e materiali per le amministrazioni pubbliche. Bari: Cacucci. ISBN 9788884224293. OCLC 848808598.

== Honours ==
=== Civil honours ===
- Grand Officer of the Order of Merit of the Italian Republic (2010)
- Commander of the Order of Merit of the Italian Republic (2003)
- Officer of the Order of Merit of the Italian Republic (1996)
- Knight of the Order of Merit of the Italian Republic (1991)
- Silver Medal of Merit from the Italian Red Cross.

=== Military honours ===
- Commander's Cross with Swords of Melitense Merit of the Sovereign Military Hospitaller Order of Saint John of Jerusalem, of Rhodes and of Malta.
- Commander of Merit of the Sacred Military Constantinian Order of Saint George.
- Knight of the Equestrian Order of the Holy Sepulcher of Jerusalem.
- Mauritian Medal for Merit, after ten decades of military career, on the initiative of the president of the Italian Republic.
- Gold Cross, for length of service in the Guardia di Finanza, after 40 years of military service.
- Golden Military Medal of Merit, for his long command career at the Guardia di Finanza, after 20 years in command service.
