= United Populars =

Political party in Italy

United Populars Popolari Uniti
- Founder: Antonio Potenza
- Coordinator: Sergio Potenza
- Regional Coordinator: Rocco Chiriaco
- Founded: February 2008
- Split from: Union of Democrats for Europe
- Headquarters: Via del Popolo, 64; 85100 Potenza
- Ideology: Christian democracy

Website
- http://www.popolariuniti.it

The United Populars (Popolari Uniti) is a regional Centrist and Christian-democratic political party based in Basilicata, Italy.

The party was founded in February 2008 by splinters from the UDEUR who wanted to continue the alliance with the centre-left governing coalition, both locally and nationally. They included Antonio Potenza (regional minister), Gaetano Fierro and Luigi Scaglione, all three regional deputies of Basilicata, and several provincial and municipal ministers, including Carmine Nigro, President of the Province of Matera.

In the 2008 general election the party won 4.1% of the vote in Basilicata for the Senate.

In the 2010 regional election the party gained 5.9% of the vote and one regional councillor, Luigi Scaglione.

In the 2013 regional election the party, in alliance with the Democratic Centre (CD), won 5.0% of the vote, but no Popular was elected.

In the 2019 regional election a joint list formed by CD and other "Populars" obtained 3.3% of the vote and no elects.

In the 2024 regional election the party ran in a joint list with the Union of the Centre and Christian Democracy with Rotondi, obtaining 2.5% of the vote and no seats.
