= 1980 Basilicata regional election =

3rd election of the Regional Council and president of Basilicata

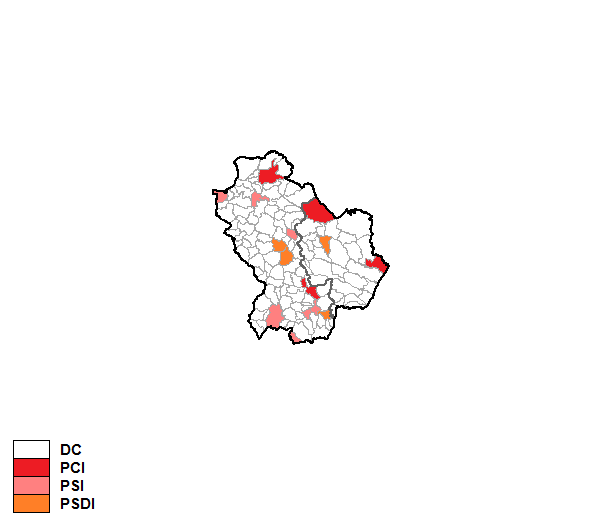
Largest party by municipality

The 1980 Basilicata regional election took place on 8 June 1980.

== Events ==
Christian Democracy was by far the largest party, largely ahead of the Italian Communist Party, which came distantly second. After the election Vincenzo Verrastro, the incumbent Christian Democratic President, was re-elected President for the third time in a row. In 1982 Verrastro was replaced by fellow Christian Democrat Carmelo Azzarà.

== Results ==
Parties	votes	votes (%)	seats
Christian Democracy	161,611	45.2	14
Italian Communist Party	89,223	24.9	8
Italian Socialist Party	48,929	13.7	4
Italian Social Movement	19,704	5.5	2
Italian Democratic Socialist Party	18,660	5.2	2
Italian Liberal Party	6,124	1.7	-
Italian Republican Party	5,626	1.6	-
Proletarian Unity Party	4,658	1.3	-
Proletarian Democracy	3,241	0.9	-
Total	357,776	100.0	30

Source: Ministry of the Interior
