= 1970 Basilicata regional election =

1st election of the Regional Council and president of Basilicata

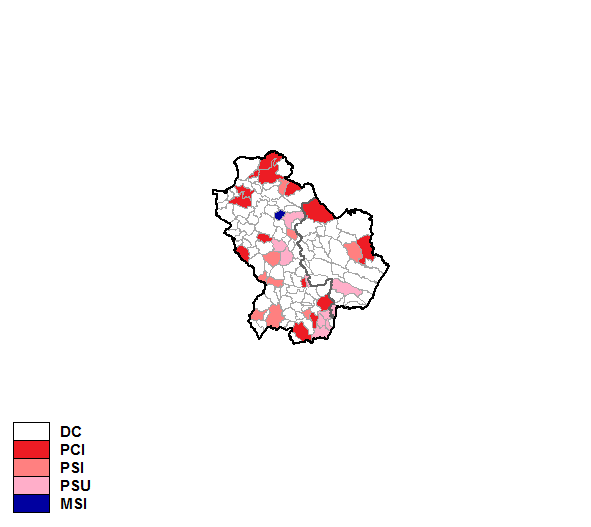
Largest party by municipality

The 1970 Basilicata regional election took place on 7–8 June 1970.

== Events ==
Christian Democracy was by far the largest party, gaining almost twice the share of vote of the Italian Communist Party, which came distantly second. After the election Christian Democrat Vincenzo Verrastro was elected President of the Region.

== Results ==
Parties	votes	votes (%)	seats
Christian Democracy	131,602	42.4	14
Italian Communist Party	74,688	24.0	7
Italian Socialist Party	39,464	12.7	4
Unitary Socialist Party	27,301	8.8	2
Italian Social Movement	14,984	4.8	1
Italian Liberal Party	9,623	3.1	1
Italian Socialist Party of Proletarian Unity	7,653	2.5	1
Italian Republican Party	5,407	1.7	-
Total	310,722	100.0	30

Source: Ministry of the Interior
