= 1975 Basilicata regional election =

2nd election of the Regional Council and president of Basilicata

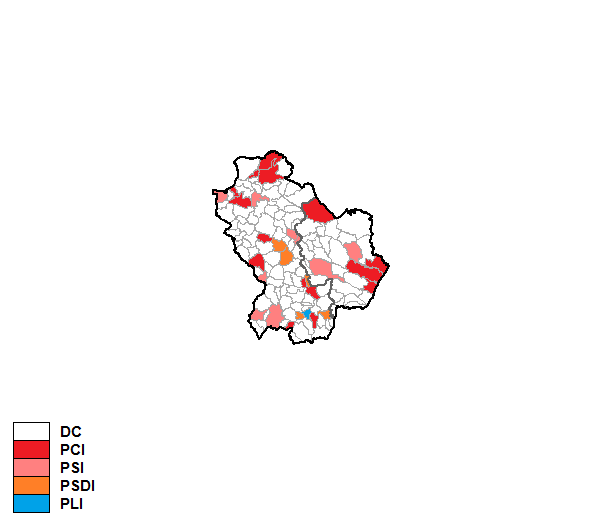
Largest party by municipality

The 1975 Basilicata regional election took place on 15 June 1975.

== Events ==
Christian Democracy was by far the largest party, largely ahead of the Italian Communist Party, which came distantly second. After the election Vincenzo Verrastro, the incumbent Christian Democratic President, was re-elected president.

== Results ==
Parties	votes	votes (%)	seats
Christian Democracy	144,420	41.9	13
Italian Communist Party	93,659	27.1	9
Italian Socialist Party	45,665	13.2	4
Italian Democratic Socialist Party	23,732	6.9	2
Italian Social Movement	22,132	6.4	2
Italian Liberal Party	97,087	2.1	-
Italian Republican Party	5,506	1.6	-
Popular Unity	2,927	0.9	-
Total	345,128	100.0	30

Source: Ministry of the Interior
