= 2019 Basilicata regional election =

11th election of the Regional Council and president of Basilicata

- 24 March 2019

All 21 seats to the Regional Council of Basilicata
- Turnout: 53.52% (▲3.92%)
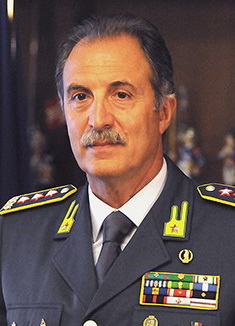

	Majority party	Minority party	Third party
Candidate	Vito Bardi	Carlo Trerotola	Antonio Mattia
Party	Forza Italia	Independent (Note: Carlo Trerotola was an independent politician close to the Democratic Party.)	Five Star Movement
Alliance	Centre-right	Centre-left
Seats won	13	5	3
Seat change	▲8	▼8	▲1
Popular vote	124,716	97,866	60,070
Percentage	42.2%	33.1%	20.3%
Swing	▲22.8%	▼26.5%	▲7.1%
President before election
Flavia Franconi (acting)
PD
Elected President
Vito Bardi
FI

The 2019 Basilicata regional election took place on 24 March 2019. The election was for all 21 seats of the Regional Council of Basilicata and the president of Basilicata, who automatically became a member of the council alongside the second-placed candidate. This election was the last one in Italy before the 2019 European Parliament election and the third one of the 2019 Italian regional elections.

While the original election date was 26 May 2019, a snap election was called upon the resignation of the then incumbent president Marcello Pittella, a member of the Democratic Party, on 24 January 2019. After the subsequent dissolution of the Regional Council, the vice-president Flavia Franconi, also a member of the Democratic Party, became the acting president, while Carlo Trerotola was chosen as the candidate.

The election was won by the centre-right coalition and their presidential candidate Vito Bardi of Forza Italia, amid a divided centre-left coalition that was also marred by scandals. It was the centre-right coalition's first regional win in Basilicata since direct elections have been held since 1995 and Bardi was the first right-wing president since the office was established in 1970.

== Background ==
The election was called on 20 November 2018, with the chosen date being 26 May 2019. It was later moved to 24 March 2019 after Marcello Pittella's resignation as president. Since the 1995 Basilicata regional election, the centre-left coalition had won each regional election with a large margin. In the 2018 Italian general election, both the centre-right coalition and the M5S substantially improved their performance; for the first time, the centre-right tied with the centre-left (including Free and Equal, which in 2018 was not a member of the coalition led by Democratic Party), and the Five Star Movement won about double the votes gained by the Democratic Party and Free and Equal combined in the Chamber of Deputies. (Note: See "Camera 04/03/2018 Area Italia (escl. Valle d'Aosta) – Circoscrizione Basilicata". Eligendo Archivio (in Italian). 8 March 2018. Archived from the original on 22 March 2024.) Due to the centre-left coalition's rooting in the region prior to the centre-right coalition's win, which ended the centre-left coalition's 24-year rule, Basilicata was considered to be politically the Emilia-Romagna of Southern Italy and Southern Italy's red region.

== Electoral system ==
In 2018, a new electoral law was established for the 2019 regional election. The new electoral law follows proportional representation with a threshold of 3% for party lists and 4% for lists in coalitions that failed to reach the 8% threshold. If the first coalition wins 30% of the vote, the parties collectively receive 11 (55%) to 14 seats (67%). For the presidential election, a candidate needs to win by a simple majority (first-past-the-post). To cast his vote, the voter can make a single mark on the name of a presidential candidate, and in this case the vote is not transmitted to any party list. If the voter marks the symbol of one of the lists, the vote is automatically transferred to the candidate supported by that list. Since the approval of the new regional electoral law in 2018, split voting is not possible, i.e. voting on a list and a candidate who is not supported by it.

According to the Tatarella Law of 1995 still in force, in addition to the newly elected president, the candidate for president of the coalition who ranks second automatically gains one seat (the first of his coalition or single party list) in the Regional Council. The remaining 19 seats are assigned on a province basis, proportionally with respect to the population of the provinces of Potenza and Matera. The voter can express two preferences, reserving the second to a candidate of a different sex, otherwise the second preferences will not be valid. Among the innovations are the introduction of gender equality (each party list cannot have more than 60% of candidates of the same sex) and the abolition of the price list and of the split vote.

== Campaign ==
On 20 February 2019, Marcello Pittella, who was endorsed by the Democratic Party and the Lucanian Radicals, announced he would not run for a second term, (Note: At the time, Pittella was a divisive figure within the centre-left coalition, and was being investigated since 6 July 2018; he was arrested and placed under house arrest on charges of being the deus ex machina of a system of rigged competitions for the assignment of roles in regional healthcare. Due to the Severino Law, he resigned as president of Basilicata at the beginning of 2019. On 22 December 2021, the Court of Matera acquitted him of all charges and rejected the request for three years in prison presented by the public prosecutor as part of what came to be known as the Sanitopoli lucana scandal, while seven managers of healthcare companies had instead been sentenced to sentences between two and five years. Pittella said: "These have been difficult, hard years. I was a front-page monster. But I always had the faith that time could reveal the truth." On 1 March 2024, the Potenza Court of Appeal confirmed the acquittal of Pittella.) and decided to support Carlo Trerotola, the new centre-left candidate. With the retirement of Pittella, the majority of the left-wing Free and Equal returned in the centre-left coalition with the list Progressives for Basilicata. A joint list of left-wing parties ran alone with Valerio Tramutoli as its presidential candidate.

The presidential candidate of the centre-right coalition was Vito Bardi, an independent politician and former general of Guardia di Finanza who later joined Silvio Berlusconi's Forza Italia. The presidential candidate of the Five Star Movement was Antonio Mattia. The presidential candidate of Lega Sud Ausonia, a regional party that usually ran alone, Antonio Postorivo, was excluded due to bureaucratic issues.

== Political parties and candidates ==
Political party or alliance	Constituent lists	Previous result		Candidate
Political party or alliance	Constituent lists	Votes (%)	Seats	Candidate
Centre-left coalition	Democratic Communities – Democratic Party (PD)	24.8	4	Carlo Trerotola
Centre-left coalition	Italian Socialist Party (PSI)	7.5	1	Carlo Trerotola
Centre-left coalition	Federation of the Greens–Reality Italy (FdV–RI)	5.9 (RI)	1 (RI)	Carlo Trerotola
Centre-left coalition	Progressives for Basilicata (incl. Art.1)	—N/a	—N/a	Carlo Trerotola
Centre-left coalition	Forward Basilicata (AB)	—N/a	—N/a	Carlo Trerotola
Centre-left coalition	Trerotola for President (CD – Popular Project) (incl. PRI)	—N/a	—N/a	Carlo Trerotola
Centre-left coalition	Basilicata First	—N/a	—N/a	Carlo Trerotola
Centre-right coalition	Forza Italia (FI)	12.3	2	Vito Bardi
Centre-right coalition	Brothers of Italy (FdI)	5.1	1	Vito Bardi
Centre-right coalition	League (Lega)	—N/a	—N/a	Vito Bardi
Centre-right coalition	Identity and Action (IDeA)	—N/a	—N/a	Vito Bardi
Centre-right coalition	Positive Basilicata – Bardi for President (BP)	—N/a	—N/a	Vito Bardi
Five Star Movement (M5S)		9.0	2	Antonio Mattia
Possible Basilicata (incl. SI, PRC, DemA)		—N/a	—N/a	Valerio Tramutoli

== Opinion polls ==
Date	Polling firm	Trerotola	Bardi	Mattia	Tramutoli	Undecided	Lead
24 Mar 2019	Election results	33.1	42.2	20.3	4.4	N/A	9.1
5–8 Mar 2019	Venum (without undecided)	35.0	38.0	22.0	5.0	0.0	3.0
5–8 Mar 2019	Venum (with undecided)	26.1	28.7	16.5	3.8	24.9	2.6

== Results ==
24 March 2019 Basilicata regional election results
Candidates	Votes	%	Seats	Parties	Votes	%	Seats
Vito Bardi	124,716	42.20	1	League	55,393	19.15	6
Vito Bardi	124,716	42.20	1	Forza Italia	26,457	9.14	3
Vito Bardi	124,716	42.20	1	Brothers of Italy	17,112	5.91	1
Vito Bardi	124,716	42.20	1	Identity and Action	12,094	4.18	1
Vito Bardi	124,716	42.20	1	Positive Basilicata–Bardi for President	11,492	3.97	1
Vito Bardi	124,716	42.20	1	Total	122,548	42.36	12
Carlo Trerotola	97,866	33.11	1	Forward Basilicata	24,957	8.63	2
Carlo Trerotola	97,866	33.11	1	Democratic Communities – Democratic Party	22,423	7.65	2
Carlo Trerotola	97,866	33.11	1	Progressives for Basilicata	12,908	4.46	–
Carlo Trerotola	97,866	33.11	1	Italian Socialist Party	10,913	3.77	–
Carlo Trerotola	97,866	33.11	1	Basilicata First	9,748	3.37	–
Carlo Trerotola	97,866	33.11	1	Democratic Centre – Popular Project	9,559	3.30	–
Carlo Trerotola	97,866	33.11	1	Federation of the Greens–Reality Italy	5,492	1.90	–
Carlo Trerotola	97,866	33.11	1	Total	96,000	33.18	4
Antonio Mattia	60,070	20.32	–	Five Star Movement	58,658	20.27	3
Valerio Tramutoli	12,912	4.37	–	Possible Basilicata	12,124	4.19	–
Invalid votes	11,624	–					
Total candidates	307,188	100.00	2	Total parties	289,330	100.00	19
Registered voters	573,970	53.52					
Source: Ministry of the Interior – Results

Popular vote
M5S	20.27%
Lega	19.15%
FI	9.14%
AB	8.63%
PD	7.65%
FdI	5.91%
PpB	4.46%
Pos	4.19%
IDeA	4.18%
BP–Bardi	3.97%
PSI	3.77%
PB	3.37%
Trerotola	3.30%
FdV–RI	1.90%

President
Bardi	42.20%
Trerotola	33.11%
Mattia	20.32%
Tramutoli	4.37%

=== Results by province ===
Province	Bardi	Trerotola	Mattia	Tramutoli	Turnout
Potenza	82,244 (41.01%)	69,016 (34.41%)	40,103 (20.00%)	9,183 (4.58%)	52.40%
Matera	42,472 (44.70%)	28,850 (30.36%)	19,967 (21.01%)	3,729 (3.92%)	56.03%

=== Results by capital city ===
City	Bardi	Trerotola	Mattia	Tramutoli	Turnout
Potenza	15,688 (40.55%)	11,863 (30.6%)	7,558 (19.54%)	3,576 (9.24)	68.79%
Matera	10,969 (37.51%)	7,740 (26.47%)	9,039 (30.91%)	1,492 (5.10%)	59.88%

=== Seats by province ===
Province	Lega	PD	FI	M5S	FdI	Others	Total
Potenza	5	1	2	2	0	2	12
Matera	1	1	1	1	1	2	7

=== Voter turnout ===
Region	Time		
Region	12:00	19:00	23:00
Basilicata	13.31%	39.73%	53.52%
Province	Time		
Province	12:00	19:00	23:00
Matera	13.08%	40.82%	56.03%
Potenza	13.42%	39.24%	52.40%
Source: Ministry of the Interior – Turnout
