= Reality Italy =

Reality Italy Realtà Italia
- President: Giacomo Olivieri
- Founded: 2013
- Dissolved: 2018
- National affiliation: Centre-left coalition

Website
- www.realtaitalia.it/

Reality Italy (Italian: Realtà Italia, RI) was a regional political party active in Italy's mainland South.

== History ==
The party was formed in March 2013 by Giacomo Olivieri, a regional councillor in Apulia, upon the break-up of Moderates and Populars, a regional party. Many high-ranking members of RI (notably including Elio Belcastro and Arturo Iannaccone) are supplied by Autonomy South, with which RI signed a federative pact. In 2013 RI established close ties with Pino Arlacchi MEP, member of the Democratic Party (PD) and former member of PCI, DS and IdV.

In the 2013 regional election in Basilicata the party, which supported Democrat Marcello Pittella, obtained 5.9% of the vote and one councillor, Paolo Galante. In the 2014 municipal election in Bari Olivieri came second in the primary with 42% of the vote and the party won 5.5% of the vote in the general election.

In 2015 RI formed a federation with the Democratic Centre (CD). In the regional election in Apulia the alliance was enlarged with the inclusion of the Union of the Centre (UdC): the CD–RI–UdC list, which supported PD's Michele Emiliano for President, won 5.9% of the vote and three regional councillors, none of whom from the RI's fold.

In September 2018 Giacomo Olivieri decided to dissolve the party to devote himself full time to his profession as a lawyer.

== Election results ==
=== Regional Councils ===
Region	Election year	Votes	%	Seats	+/–
Basilicata	2013	14,012	5.93	1 / 21	▲1
Basilicata	2019	5,492 (with FdV)	1.9	0 / 21	▼1
Apulia	2015	99,021 (with UDC–CD)	6.19	3 / 51	▲3

== Leadership ==
- President: Giacomo Olivieri (2013–2019)
