= Volt Italy =

Eurofederalist political party in Italy

Volt Italy Volt Italia
- Abbreviation: Volt
- Leader: Guido Silvestri; Daniela Patti
- Founded: 14 July 2018
- Ideology: Social liberalism; Pro-Europeanism; European federalism
- National affiliation: PD–IDP (2022); More Europe (since 2025)
- European political alliance: Volt Europa
- Colors: Purple
- Regional Councils: 1 / 896

Website
- voltitalia.it

Volt Italy (Italian: Volt Italia) is an Eurofederalist political party in Italy. It is an affiliate of Volt Europa and was founded in 2018. Volt was unable to take part in the 2019 European Parliament election in Italy, failing to obtain the required 150,000 notarised supporter signatures. Since then, the party has contested municipal and regional elections, winning a number of mandates and providing a deputy mayor since October 2021.

== History ==
National sections of Volt Europa. The borders of the European Union are shown in red.

Volt Italy was officially registered as a party in July 2018 as the 5th national offshoot of Volt Europe. The aim was to participate in the 2019 European Parliament election, for which the party collected signatures throughout Italy but also in other European countries. Volt failed to clear the hurdle of collecting 150,000 notarised supporter signatures. In May 2019, Volt contested its first election in Italy in the city of Novi Ligure, as part of a coalition in support of the incumbent major. In January 2020, Volt contested its first regional election with the 2020 Emilia-Romagna regional election, and failed to enter the regional council with 0.43%. The party engaged in opposition to the 2020 Italian constitutional referendum to reduce the size of the Italian Parliament, which was later approved. To be able to achieve the associated threshold, Volt stated that it was open to cooperation with other liberal forces.

In March 2021, Volt Italy refused to become part of a new left-wing alliance as part of the call "Now we can go, for a new reformist and liberal-democratic alliance", referring to its special character as a European party. A merger with other parties at the national level would not be compatible with a cross-border understanding of the party as a party that advocates the same contents everywhere but Volt would continue to be open to cooperation. In addition, Volt criticised that parties should see themselves less as an antipole but rather see their task as developing and offering solutions to problems. Also in March 2021, the party launched the campaign "I live, I work, I vote", campaigning for the right of non-EU citizens to vote in local elections, as the current system would exclude a large part of the population from political participation.

The party supports referendums on the legalisation of cannabis and euthanasia to be held in 2022. Since 6 April 2022, Volt Italy has been a member of the European Movement International in Italy. At the General Assembly in Bari on 14–15 October 2023, Daniela Patti and Guido Silvestri were elected as co-leaders, while Pasquale Lisena was confirmed as treasurer.

In 2025, Volt Italy proposed a referendum (named "Uguali") that would modify part of the "Cirinnà law" "to abolish the distinctions between the institution of civil unions and civil marriage, effectively extending access to civil marriage to couples formed by people of the same sex. The referendum was however criticized by various outlets and organizations, including Arcigay, due to the doubts about this reform's effectiveness in de facto guaranteeing the institution of gay marriage in Italy, even asking to remove the initiative from online and to stop taking firms.

== Elections ==
=== 2019 local elections ===
In May 2019, Volt contested an election in Italy for the first time in Novi Ligure, supporting the incumbent candidate Rocchino Muliere. Despite achieving 1.43% of the votes, the coalition failed to secure the re-election of the Mayor, thus preventing Volt from entering the local council.

=== 2020 regional and local elections ===
In the regional elections in Emilia-Romagna, Volt joined the coalition of Stefano Bonaccini with a campaign focused on health, social justice, and economic development. Among the demands during the campaign were the introduction of environmental and social requirements in public tenders and the introduction of consultation tables between schools, universities and companies. The party achieved 0.43% and thus fell short of entering the regional council.

In September 2020, Volt contested the regional elections in Apulia, Tuscany, and Veneto, as it did the local elections in Bolzano, Cascina, Mantua, Matera, Senigallia, Trento, Venice and Voghera, as part of joint coalition lists. The party achieved one mandate in Mantua, and four in Matera. In May 2022, a councillor in Matera moved to Volt.

=== 2021 local elections ===
In October 2021, Volt contested local elections in Turin, Milan, Trieste, Bologna, Rome, Varese, Isernia, Sesto Fiorentino, Pavullo nel Frignano, Roseto degli Abruzzi, and Bettona. The party won four seats in Isernia, and one seat each in Rome and Roseto degli Abruzzi. In other cities, seats were won for joint lists but none for Volt. The party achieved by far its best result in Isernia with 6.58%. The party focused on mobility and the environment, housing policy, and young people, as well as entrepreneurship. After the local election, Federica Vinci became deputy mayor of Isernia.

=== 2022 local elections ===
In June 2022, the party took part in the local elections in Monza, Lissone, Verona, Parma, Messina, Padua, Lissone, Como, Catanzaro, Castiglione delle Stiviere, Lucca, Carrara, Leverano, Marcon, Palermo, Capua, and Genoa. In other cities, joint lists with other parties won seats but none were won by Volt. Volt won one mandate each in Verona, Genoa, Leverano, and Castiglione delle Stiviere.

=== 2022 general election ===
Volt did not elect a deputy or senator in the 2022 Italian general election as part of the centre-left coalition.

=== 2023 local elections ===
On the occasion of the regional elections on 12–13 Fedruary 2023, Volt in Lazio joined the Italian Radicals and More Europe in support of Alessio D'Amato, the outgoing councilor of the centre-left coalition that governed Lazio but failed to elected any councilor with 0.96%. In Lombardy, Volt supported the civic list of the centre-left candidate Pierfrancesco Majorino but failed to elect any of its own candidates. In the May local elections, Volt appeared on some civic lists, such as in Brescia, while it had its own list in Treviso (0.76%).

=== 2024 regional elections ===
In the 2024 Basilicata regional election, Volt's candidate, Eustachio Follia, gained 1.21%.

=== 2024 local elections ===
On the occasion of the 2024 local elections, Volt formed a list together in Perugia with the Greens and Left Alliance in support of the centre-left coalition candidate Vittoria Ferdinandi.

== Election results ==
=== Italian Parliament ===
Election	Leader	Chamber of Deputies				Senate of the Republic			
Election	Leader	Votes	%	Seats	+/–	Votes	%	Seats	+/–
2022	Guido Silvestri; Daniela Patti	Into PD–IDP		0 / 400	New	Into PD–IDP		0 / 200	New

=== European Parliament ===
Election	Leader	Votes	%	Seats	+/–	EP Group
2024	Guido Silvestri; Daniela Patti	Into PD		0 / 76	New	–
