= 1985 Basilicata regional election =

4th election of the Regional Council and president of Basilicata

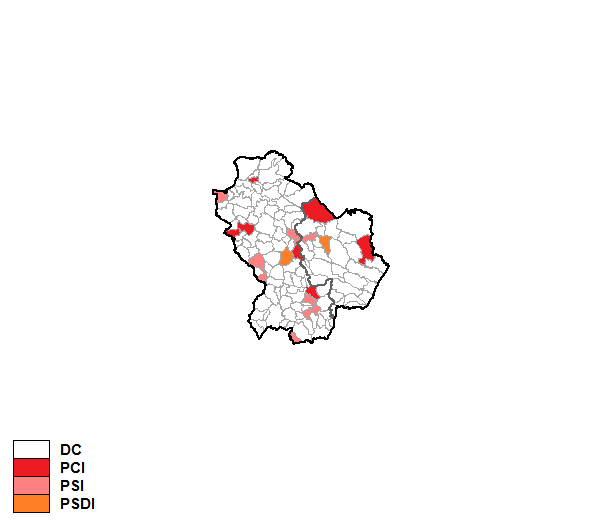
Largest party by municipality

The 1985 Basilicata regional election took place on 12 May 1985.

== Events ==
Christian Democracy was by far the largest party, largely ahead of the Italian Communist Party, which came distantly second. After the election Christian Democrat Gaetano Michetti was elected President of the Region.

== Results ==
Parties	votes	votes (%)	seats
Christian Democracy	171,052	44.7	14
Italian Communist Party	92,747	24.2	7
Italian Socialist Party	58,744	15.4	5
Italian Democratic Socialist Party	23,820	6.2	2
Italian Social Movement	19,432	5.1	1
Italian Republican Party	6,505	1.7	1
Italian Liberal Party	5,109	1.3	-
Proletarian Democracy	3,932	1.0	-
Valdostan Union – Democratic Party – others	862	0.2	-
Pensioners Italian Alliance – Venetian League	556	0.2	-
Total	382,759	100.0	30

Source: Ministry of the Interior
