= Angelo Raffaele Dinardo =

Italian politician

President of Basilicata
- In office 15 June 1995 – 13 May 2000
- Preceded by: Antonio Boccia
- Succeeded by: Filippo Bubbico

Personal details
- Born: 7 January 1932 Irsina, Italy
- Died: 26 February 2015 (aged 83) Potenza, Italy
- Party: Italian People's Party
- Education: University of Salerno
- Profession: Politician, teacher, syndicalist

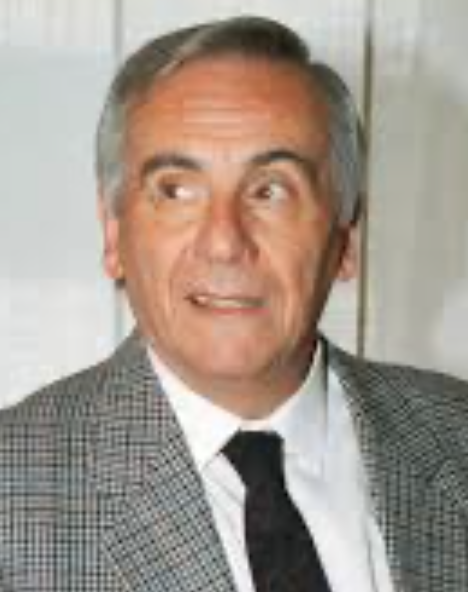
Angelo Raffaele Dinardo in 2020

Angelo Raffaele Dinardo (7 January 1932 – 26 February 2015) was an Italian politician. He served as the President of the Italian region of Basilicata from 1995 to 2000, as a member of the now defunct Italian People's Party (PPI).

Dinardo died in Potenza on 26 February 2015, at the age of 83.
