= 1990 Basilicata regional election =

5th election of the Regional Council and president of Basilicata

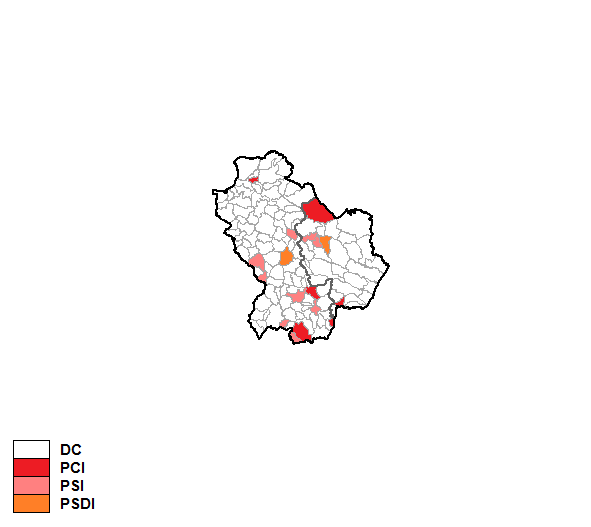
Largest party by municipality

The 1990 Basilicata regional election took place on 6–7 May 1990.

== Events ==
Christian Democracy was by far the largest party, gaining more than twice the share of vote of its main competitors, the Italian Communist Party, which had its worst result ever in a regional election, and the Italian Socialist Party, which gained its best result ever. After the election, the Christian Democrat Antonio Boccia was elected President of the Region.

== Results ==
Parties	votes	votes (%)	seats
Christian Democracy	185,409	47.2	15
Italian Communist Party	75,604	19.2	6
Italian Socialist Party	70,947	18.0	6
Italian Democratic Socialist Party	23,918	6.1	2
Italian Social Movement	13,268	3.4	1
Italian Republican Party	7,683	2.0	-
Italian Liberal Party	5,889	1.5	-
Green List	3,722	1.0	-
Proletarian Democracy	2,853	0.7	-
Rainbow Greens	1,829	0.5	-
Antiprohibitionists on Drugs	1,476	0.4	-
Southern League Lucania	631	0.2	-
Total	393,229	100.0	30

Source: Ministry of the Interior
