= Vincenzo Verrastro =

Italian politician (1919–2004)

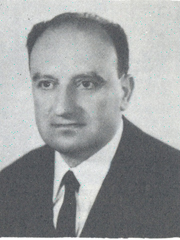

President of Basilicata
- In office 7 June 1970 – 1 April 1982
- Preceded by: Office established
- Succeeded by: Carmelo Azzarà

President of the Regional Council of Basilicata
- In office 18 July 1980 – 28 July 1980
- Preceded by: Giacomo Schettini
- Succeeded by: Romualdo Coviello

Member of the Senate of the Republic
- In office 5 June 1968 – 10 November 1970
- Constituency: Basilicata

President of the Province of Potenza
- In office 21 March 1958 – 1967

Personal details
- Born: 6 May 1919 Avigliano, Province of Potenza, Kingdom of Italy
- Died: 9 August 2004 (aged 85) Potenza, Basilicata, Italy
- Party: Christian Democracy
- Education: University of Naples Federico II
- Profession: Teacher

Vito Vincenzo Verrastro (6 May 1919 – 9 August 2004) was an Italian politician who served as the first president of Basilicata (1970–1982), president of the Province of Potenza (1958–1967), and a member of the Senate of the Republic (1968–1970).
