= Vito De Filippo =

Italian politician (born 1963)

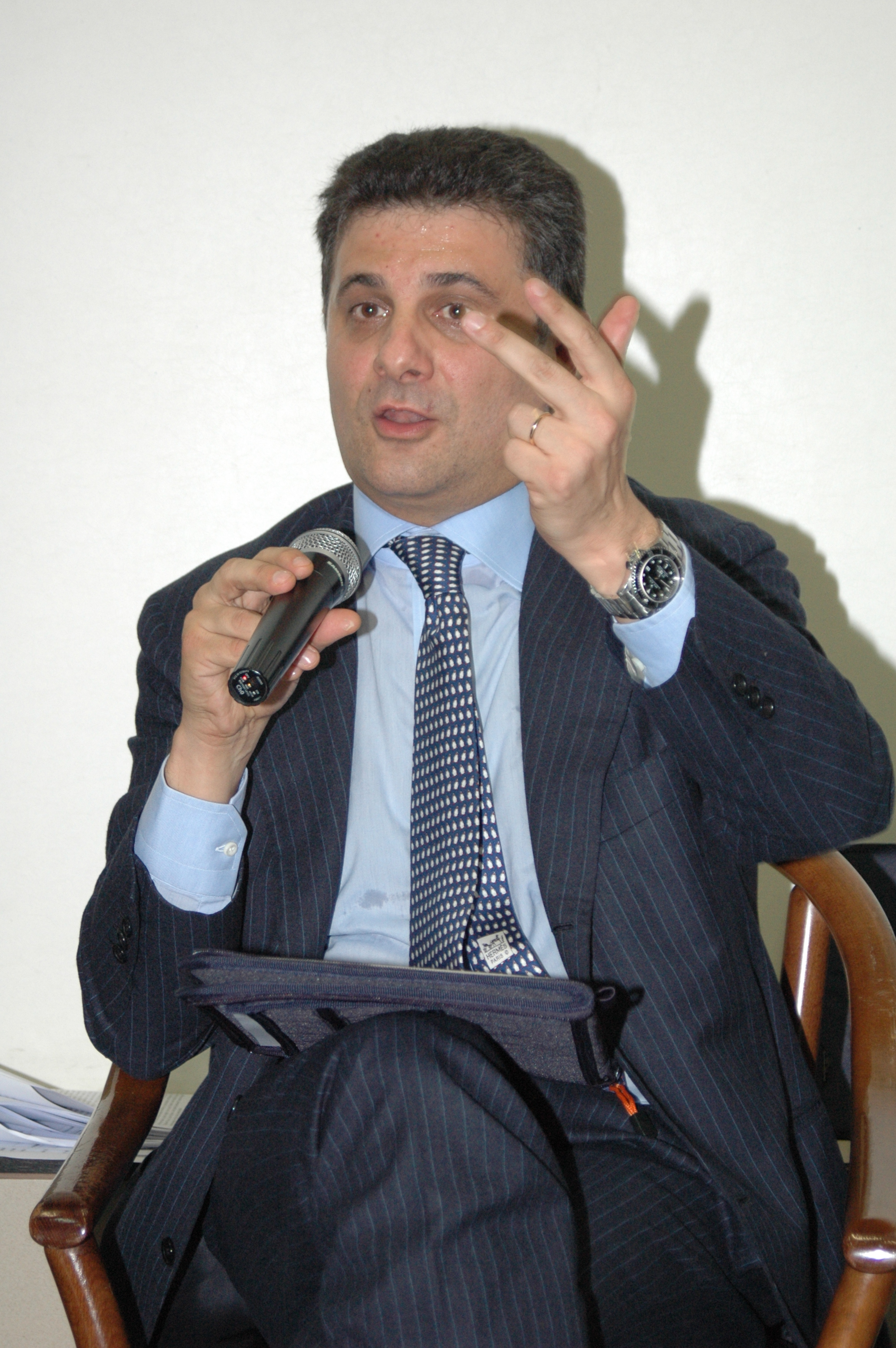
- De Filippo in 2009

Member of the Chamber of Deputies
- In office 23 March 2018 – 13 October 2022
- Constituency: Basilicata

Undersecretary of State of the Ministry of Education, Universities and Research
- In office 29 December 2016 – 1 June 2018
- Preceded by: Davide Faraone
- Succeeded by: Armando Bartolazzi; Maurizio Fugatti

Undersecretary of State of the Ministry of Health
- In office 28 February 2014 – 12 December 2016
- Preceded by: Paolo Fadda
- Succeeded by: Davide Faraone

President of Basilicata
- In office 6 May 2005 – 18 December 2013
- Preceded by: Filippo Bubbico
- Succeeded by: Marcello Pittella

President of the Regional Council of Basilicata
- In office 2 December 2003 – 7 June 2005
- Preceded by: Aldo Michele Radice
- Succeeded by: Filippo Bubbico

Member of the Regional Council of Basilicata
- In office 8 June 1995 – 20 December 2013

Personal details
- Born: August 27, 1963 Sant'Arcangelo, Italy
- Party: PPI (1994–2002); DL (2002–2007); PD (2007–2019; since 2021); IV (2019–2021)
- Spouse: Rosa Tutino (m. 1988)
- Children: 2
- Education: University of Naples Federico II
- Occupation: Politician, journalist

Vito De Filippo (born 27 August 1963) is an Italian politician. He served as the president of Basilicata from 6 May 2005 until his resignation on 24 April 2013 during his second term. From 2014 to 2018, he served as the state undersecretary of the Ministry of Health and undersecretary of the Ministry of Education in Matteo Renzi and Enrico Letta's governments, respectively, and was a deputy from 2018 to 2022. In 2022, his senatorial candidacy was unsuccessful.

== Early life, family, and education ==
De Filippo was born in Sant'Arcangelo, in the Basilicata region, to Nicola De Filippo and Rosa Maria Briamonte, belonging to an ancient family of farmers present in the municipality for centuries as certified by the 18th-century Onciario Land Registry. De Filippo graduated in philosophy with honours at the University of Naples Federico II and became a journalist; he collaborated with philosophy magazines and various national and local newspapers. He also worked for a local TV. His political activity began in the Italian People's Party, the left-leaning legal successor of Christian Democracy, at the age of 26, in the Provincial Council of Potenza; he held the office of provincial health assessor and vice-president of the province of Potenza.

== Political career ==
In 1995, De Filippo became regional councilor of Basilicata; he held the position of group leader and regional assessor for Agriculture. In 2000, he was reconfirmed regional councilor and became vice-president of the Regional Council of Basilicata and Regional Health Assessor. In 2002, he joined Democracy is Freedom – The Daisy. In 2003, he was appointed president of the Regional Council of Basilicata. In 2005, De Filippo was elected president of Basilicata, becoming the region's youngest president, and was re-confirmed in 2010 as member of the Democratic Party, a merge of the Italian Communist Party and Christian Democracy's legal successor parties, which he joined in 2007. In both occasions, he won in a landslide, being in percentage terms the most voted president of an Italian region.

On 24 April 2013, the prosecutor of Potenza arrested two Regional Assessors of the De Filippo Cabinet: the Assessor for Labour Vincenzo Viti (Democratic Party) and the Assessor for Agriculture Rosa Mastrosimone (Italy of Values), as well as the head of the opposition Nicola Pagliuca (The People of Freedom), establishing the prohibition of residence for 11 between councilors and former councilors for embezzlement in the scandal of repayments to regional groups. (Note: See "Rimborsi illeciti, arrestati due assessori e un consigliere in Basilicata". Il Sole 24 Ore (in Italian). 24 April 2013. "Basilicata, liberi assessori e capogruppo del Pdl". Corriere della Sera. 4 May 2013. p. 25.) On the same day, De Filippo appointed a new cabinet, the third of the legislature, and presented his resignation as president of the region. In January 2015, due to the illicit repayments obtained between 2009 and 2010, De Filippo was sentenced by the Court of Accounts of Potenza to "compensate the damage produced to the Basilicata Region" for the amount of €2,641.52. (Note: See sentence: "Sent. n. 11/2015" (PDF). Corte dei conti (in Italian). 20 February 2015. Archived from the original (PDF) on 23 March 2015.) Other 21 administrators and regional councilors were sentenced (including Marcello Pittella, his successor to the presidency of the region) for a total of €196,000. In November 2016, De Fillippo was acquitted.

After his resignation as president of Basilicata, De Filippo was appointed Undersecretary of State of the Ministry of Health as part of the Renzi Cabinet and Undersecretary of State of the Ministry of Education in the Gentiloni Cabinet. In the 2018 Italian general election, he was elected a member of the Chamber of Deputies among the ranks of the Democratic Party. In 2019, he followed Matteo Renzi's split from the Democratic Party and joined Italia Viva. In 2021, he exited Italia Viva and re-joined the Democratic Party, being the first Italia Viva member of the Italian Parliament to do so. De Filippo did not share Renzi and Italia Viva's role in the 2021 Italian government crisis that led to the fall of the second Conte government in the middle of the COVID-19 pandemic in Italy. He said: "Italia Viva's choice to open the crisis while the country is going through so much difficulty and suffering was wrong." As part of the Democratic Party – Democratic and Progressive Italy list in the 2022 Italian general election, he was a candidate for the Senate of the Republic in Basilicata but was not elected.

== Personal life ==
De Filippo has been married since 1988 to Rosa Tutino, with whom he has two children: Valentina and Nico, born in 1990 and 1993, respectively.
