= Regional Council of Basilicata =

Legislative organ of Basilicata, Italy

Type
- Type: Regional council Unicameral

Leadership
- President: Marcello Pittella, Action since 2024

Structure
- Seats: 21
- Political groups: Government (13): FdI (4); FI (3); Lega (2); OL (2); Action (2); Opposition (8): PD (2); M5S (2); BCC (2); AVS – PSI – BP (1); BD (1)

Elections
- Last election: 21–22 April 2024
- Next election: 2029

Meeting place
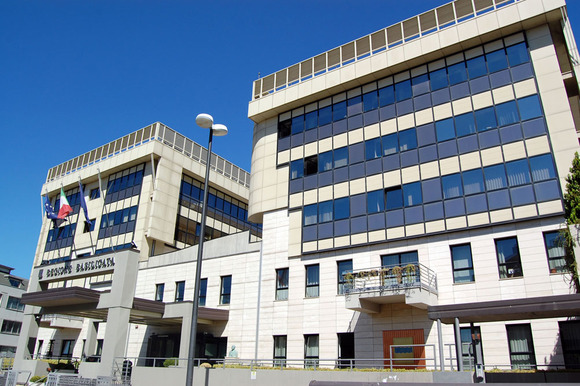
- Palace of the Region, Potenza

Website
- www.consiglio.basilicata.it

The Regional Council of Basilicata (Consiglio Regionale della Basilicata) is the legislative assembly of Basilicata.

It was first elected in 1970, when the ordinary regions were instituted, on the basis of the Constitution of Italy of 1948.

== Composition ==
The Regional Council of Basilicata was originally composed of 30 regional councillors. Following the decree-law n. 138 of 13 August 2011 the number of regional councillors was reduced to 20, with an additional seat reserved for the President of the Region.

=== Political groups ===
The Regional Council of Basilicata is currently composed of the following political groups:

Party	Seats	Status
Brothers of Italy	4 / 21	In government
Forza Italia	3 / 21	In government
League	2 / 21	In government
Lucanian Pride	2 / 21	In government
Action	2 / 21	External support
Democratic Party	2 / 21	In opposition
Five Star Movement	2 / 21	In opposition
Basilicata Common House	2 / 21	In opposition
AVS – PSI – Positive Basilicata	1 / 21	In opposition
Democratic Basilicata	1 / 21	In opposition

== See also ==
- Regional council
- Politics of Basilicata
- President of Basilicata
