= SK Kakraba =

- Born: Saru, Ghana
- Genres: Ghanaian music
- Occupations: Musician; lecturer
- Instrument: Gyil
- Years active: 1997–present
- Labels: Holy Page; Sun Ark; Awesome Tapes From Africa
- Website: https://skkakrabamusic.com/

SK Kakraba is a Ghanaian musician and performer of the country's traditional music. He makes and performs gyils, a xylophone containing 14 suspended wooden slats stretched over calabash gourds containing resonators. He was taught to build the instruments using a rare wood known by the Lobi as neura. Kakraba explained: "It's a very hard process, because you have to get the wood from five different places, only found in Ghana’s forests. The trees fall on their own and when they do, you cut them, dry the wood and lay the keys." LA Weekly has referred to Kakraba as the "world's greatest" xylophone player, and he has toured worldwide playing the gyil.

Kakraba grew up in Saru, a small village in Ghana where the gyil is held in great respect by the Lobi tribe. It is played at funerals to "help the souls of the dead reach the afterlife," and is a primary instrument of other Northern Ghana cultures like the Sisala and Dagara. Kakraba's parents also played the gyil, as did other relatives, including his uncle Kakraba Lobi, who is considered by many to be among the instrument's greatest practitioners. In 1997, Kakraba moved to Accra and began busking, and soon joined the group Hewale Sounds, who aimed to preserve and familiarise the traditional music of Ghana. Kakraba has taught the gyil at the University of Ghana's 'International Centre for African Music and Dance.'

In September 2013, his band the SK Kakraba Band released a self-titled album as a cassette on Holy Page. It was ranked at number 1 on Fact Magazine's list of "the 20 best cassette releases of 2013", with Brad Rose of the publication writing: "This music has serious soul. Everything about these tunes is purely ecstatic." The solo album Yonye was released July 2015 by Sun Ark Records, a label run by experimental musician Sun Araw as a splinter label to Drag City. Recorded after Kakaraba's arrival in the United States, it contains solo recordings and traditional pieces.

Songs of Paapieye followed in October 2015, released by Awesome Tapes From Africa as the label's first non-reissue release. The album contains six solo, instrumental recordings, spanning Kakraba's "favourite song cycles, funeral dirges, improvised interpretations on traditional songs and original compositions." It departs from Yonye in that it is smoother in sound and is an album of solo recordings as opposed to a group recording. Songs of Paapieye was recorded in a San Francisco studio belonging to Kakraba's close friend Brian Hogan. As a solo project, the album was recorded by Kakraba entirely by himself, playing live without any overdubs or accompanying guest musicians. This differentiated the project from the traditional setting for gyil music, where two gyil players may play together with accompaniment from drums, bells and sometimes singing. On 10 April 2016, he played an acclaimed performance at The Ampersand Salon.

Kakraba currently lives in Highland Park, Los Angeles, having moved to the city in 2012.

== Discography ==
- Gandayina: Xylophone Music of Ghana (Pentatonic Press, 2002)
- SK Kakraba Band (Holy Page, 2013)
- Kanbile (Solo And Ensemble Xylophone Music Of Ghana) (Pentatonic Press, 2014)
- Yonye (Sun Ark Records, 2015)
- Songs of Paapieye (Awesome Tapes From Africa, 2015)
