= Woma =

Woma may refer to:

- Bernard Woma (1966-2018), Ghanaian musician and gyile player
- Woma python (Aspidites ramsayi), also known as Ramsay's python and sand python, a species of snake endemic to Australia
- WomaNews, radical feminist newspaper
- WOMA, earlier call sign of the radio station WBDK
- WOMA-LP, earlier call sign of the radio station WLEB-LP
