= Songs of Paapieye =

Studio album by SK Kakraba
- Released: 2 October 2015
- Genre: Ghanaian music; traditional music
- Length: 33:09
- Label: Awesome Tapes From Africa
- Producer: Brian Shimkovitz

SK Kakraba chronology
Yonye (2015)	Songs of Paapieye (2015)

Songs of Paapieye is the fourth album by Ghanaian musician SK Kakraba, released in October 2015 by Awesome Tapes From Africa, becoming the first album of original material released by the typically reissue-centred label. The album showcases Kakraba's mastery of the gyil, a type of wooden, 14-slatted xylophone originating from Kakraba's native Ghana that features a distinctive, buzzy rattle with a slow decaying sound caused by spiders egg sac silk walls pulled across the gourds' holes, known in Kakraba's Lobi language as pappieye, which gives the album its name. It is smoother in sound than his previous album Yonye and is fast-paced, showcasing complex, intricate rhythms, drones and dialogue between lower, buzzing basslines and higher, syncopated notes. Many tracks feature several modes and move between different sections.

Kakraba recorded the album by himself without overdubs or accompaniment from other musicians, and used only the gyil. The tracks are song cycles, mostly drawing from Ghanaian traditional music, although there is original material on the album. Among the tracks, there are three funeral pieces. Upon release, where it was made available on a variety of formats, the album was one of only several albums of gyil music. It received critical acclaim, with critics highlighting the instrument's unusual sounds and timbres, the album's skillful pacing and Kakraba's virtuoso technique.

== Background ==
SK Kakraba is a master of the gyil xylophone, a Ghanaian instrument composed of calabash gourd resonators with 14 wooden slats strung across them. The buzzy rattle which sounds with each note, and with a decay pattern longer than the note, emits from the spiders' egg sacs' silk walls pulled across the gourds' holes, known in Kakraba's Lobi language as pappieye. While one hit is followed by another, the pappieye rattle from the first hit has yet to fully decay, creating a style of West African rhythms that are more complex than those of solitary notes. Kakraba performs, builds, teaches and sells the instrument. He first developed his skills on the instrument during his childhood days spent in Saru, Ghana, a farming village, and went on to become one of the most renowned and famous gyil players, especially after moving to Accra in 1997 around the age of 20, where Kakraba played his instrument around the zongos (Muslim ghettos) and Central Accra, which helped Kakraba get his "daily chop." He later began teaching the instrument at the University of Ghana's "International Centre for African Music and Dance."

After marrying his American-born wife, whom he met in Accra, Kakraba moved to Los Angeles in 2011, where he began releasing albums. Prior to recording Songs of Paapieye, his latest album was Yonye, released via Drag City in July 2015. He had known Awesome Tapes From Africa founder Brian Shimkovitz since 2002 when the latter was a student in Ghana, and over the years the two stayed in contact with each other. When "hanging out" in 2015, they decided "it would be cool to release a record" for Shimkovitz's label. Songs of Paapieye was recorded in San Francisco in a studio owned by Kakraba's close friend Brian Hogan. Unlike Yonye, which features occasional added drums and bells, Songs for Paapieye is a solo project, recorded by Kakraba entirely by himself, playing live without any overdubs or accompanying guest musicians. This is unlike the traditional setting for gyil music, where two gyil players may play together with accompaniment from drums, bells and sometimes singing, and instead showcases Kakraba's "polyrhyhtmic force and creativity." He used the album to showcase music that he had taken with him to Los Angeles from the central Accra ghettos. Shimkovitz has been credited by one writer for producing the album.

== Composition ==
Songs Of Paapieye contains six solo, instrumental recordings, and features Kakraba's "favourite song cycles, funeral dirges, improvised interpretations on traditional songs and original compositions." Haydon Spenceley of Drowned in Sound called the album "a series of six song cycles." Besides being an album of solo recordings as opposed to a group recording, Songs of Paapieye also departs from Yonye in that it is smoother in sound. The tracks nonetheless sound like ensembles, via the "animated dialogue" between the deep buzzing, looping basslines and the syncopated higher, clearer notes. The album includes three funeral songs, each with a rapid, stop-start nature, although these tracks are not dissimilar, however, to "Sopka," which Kakraba claims is "happy hour music" played to "please your soul." Jon Pareles of The New York Times felt that the majority of the album, including funeral pieces, displays a propulsive but unpredictable style of dance music. The album has been described as "a big wash of complex rhythms," though the music does frequently exude melody.

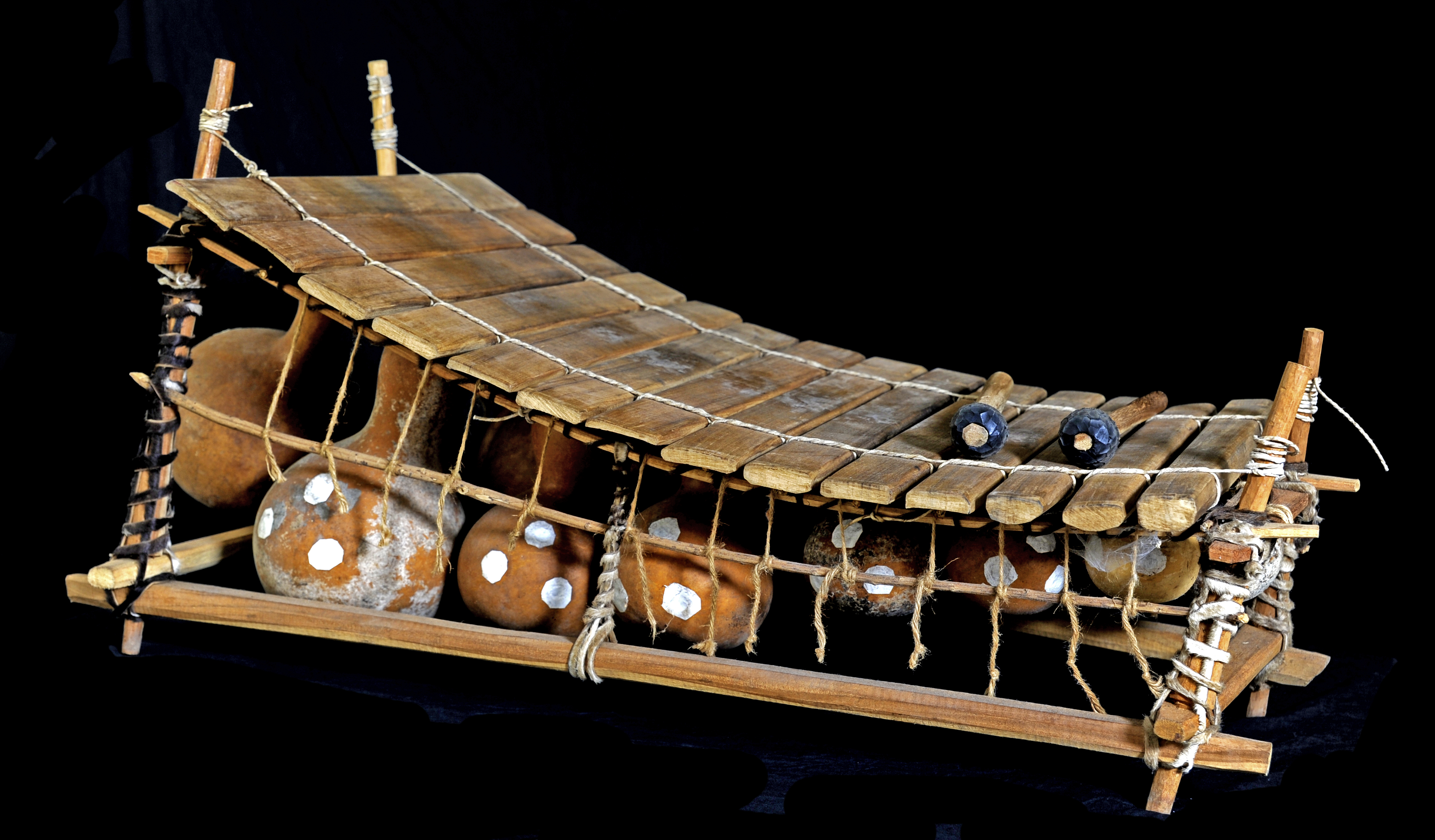
The Ghanaian gyil is the only instrument on Songs of Paapieye.

The tracks approximate contrapuntal work in that they keep a rhythmic pace, boasting a shifting bassline, and then "work around the 'lead' line." Sections of phrases become emphasised with "parallel attacks", such as octaves but typically other intervals, and the pieces' pattern is highlighted with improvisatory waves. The pieces, which typically feature a couple of modes each, are complex and fast, and the paapieye rattles compound the rhythmic complexity and avoid creating phase relationships. Aquarium Drunkard noted that although harmonic elements of the album's pulsing drones are shared with the works of minimalist composers Terry Riley and Steve Reich, Kakraba's feel is "jazzier, earthier, and more folk focused."

The album opens with the short track "Lubile Prai," which was inspired by birdsong, and boasts stop-start shifts in tempo, working to build up anticipation for the succeeding tracks. The final third of the track features propelling cascades of melody. Kakraba says the nine-minute "Banyere Yo" is about a drunken blind man. The piece opens with a frantic yet intricate rallentando and diminuendo section that showcases the musician's virtuosity, with sounds akin to the paradiddle exercises (16th-note roll) of a drummer, before leading into a section based on a highly rhythmic riff, where extra elements are added and subtracted every time the riff cycles. The final section of the song features a shift in tempo. A two-note pattern resembling a siren emerges in the middle register at one point, surrounded by offbeat accent lines. "Dairfu" is similarly frenetic, yet features a permeating mournful tone and timbre, with offset bursts of cascading notes between bass-note patterns.

By contrast, "Darikpon Variations" features a riff which, according to Spenceley, bears harmonic and melodic similarity to the "straight-ahead grooves" of rock guitarist Jimmy Page. The groove is built upon and variations soon appear, with the pulsing lower end allowing room for the higher melodic echelons of the gyil to dominate. The track is also a funeral piece and features several sections with a loping bass-note in 6/8. "Sopka" is a shorter piece which places more attention on the gyil's lower tones, while "Guun" is "a funeral song to dance to, a final send-off for the recently departed," and displays the full potential of the gyil, with, as is characteristic of the album, tempo shifts and flowing melody. It features Kakraba's polyrhythms anchored by a singular loping bassline which alternates with "more exposed, almost scat-like improvisations." The track's "fluidity and flexibility of gesture" have been compared to jazz, despite the gyil far predating the genre, and as such, the track has been described as a bridge between the musical elements of gyil music and jazz.

== Release ==
Titled in honour of the gyil, Songs of Paapieye was first announced in August 2015, the same time "Guun" was made available for streaming to promote the album. The album was then subsequently released by Awesome Tapes From Africa on 2 October 2015 on CD, vinyl, cassette and digital formats, complete with liner notes containing biographical and track-by-track information. It is the label's first release of new material, as up until that point, it had focused on re-releasing obscure African albums only initially issued as cassettes in the continent. Afropop Worldwide noted that there have been very few releases of gyil music over time, so it was likely that "[t]wo things about Ghanaian gyil music are likely to grab a first-time listener: the deep, resonant buzz of the bass notes, and the polyrhythmic virtuosity—the right-hand/left-hand limb independence of master players."

== Critical reception ==
Professional ratings
Review scores
Source	Rating
Drowned in Sound	7/10
Morning Star	3/5 stars
The List	4/5 stars
Rhythm Passport	8/10

Songs of Paapieye received critical acclaim, especially for its unusual sound and Kakraba's virtuoso technique. Jakob Baekgaard of All About Jazz wrote that the music "embraces all aspects of life, from pieces meant to accompany a funeral to a type of ancient lounge music." While he noted that information about each track is detailed in the liner notes, the music can nonetheless be enjoyed "simply as an exotic journey into an unfamiliar world of sound. The many tones and textures of the gyil, both muffled and clear, are captivating and the lively percussive rhythms speak about the life-affirming quality of the music." Haydon Spenceley of Drowned in Sound wrote that "SK Kakraba won't, by any means, provide here an album for mass consumption, but, for the brave, or for the one who is much more a connoisseur, dig in. You might just come upon something special here." Minna Zhou of Pitchfork described the effect of the paapieye as "somewhere between drone and a more stripped-down, rhythmically intricate Konono Nº1."

Ian Sinclair of Morning Star said: "Fascinating and mesmeric if a little repetitive — to my Western ears at least — it’s unlike anything you’ve ever heard before." Jason Woodbury of Aquarium Drunkard called Kakraba's style "direct, sublime and utterly captivating," and concluded that "Kakraba’s polyrhythms are enveloping, and Awesome Tapes’ first foray into modern sounds is as essential as its archival releases." Stewart Smith of The List said that Kakraba's interpretations of Lobi songs impress throughout the album. He was impressed by the unlikely sound of the album's instrumentation: "Listeners could be forgiven for thinking there’s some Konono-style electronic processing involved, but the gyil is entirely acoustic." Afropop Worldwide wrote that "Songs of Paapieye captures the richness of the traditional gyil repertoire, the sonic depth of the instrument, and the polyrhythmic complexity of Kakraba’s playing." In their 2016 Bradt Travel Guides book Ghana, authors Philip Briggs and Sean Connolly wrote that both Yonye and Songs of Paapieye are "genuinely exciting documents of a centuries-old tradition that continues to impress in the modern era."

== Track listing ==
All tracks traditional arr. Kakraba

1. "Lubile Prai" – 1:36
2. "Banyere Yo" – 9:13
3. "Darifu" – 5:13
4. "Darikpon Variations" – 7:51
5. "Sokpa" – 2:15
6. "Guun" – 7:01

== Personnel ==
Adapted from liner notes

- SK Kakraba – gyil
- Evan Conway – mastering
- Jessica Thompson – mastering
- Christopher Welz – distribution
- Riley Manion – design
- Eden Batki – photography
