= Lala Belu =

Studio album by Hailu Mergia
- Released: 23 February 2018
- Genres: Jazz; funk
- Length: 39:25
- Label: Awesome Tapes From Africa

Hailu Mergia chronology
Hailu Mergia & His Classical Instrument (2013)	Lala Belu (2018)	Yene Mircha (2020)

Professional ratings
Aggregate scores
Source	Rating
AnyDecentMusic?	7.2/10
Metacritic	81/100
Review scores
Source	Rating
AllMusic	4.5/5 stars
The Guardian	3/5 stars
Pitchfork	8/10

Lala Belu is the second studio album by Ethiopian singer-songwriter Hailu Mergia. It was released on 23 February 2018 under Awesome Tapes From Africa.

== Release ==
On 22 November 2017, Mergia announced his first album in 15 years, along with the single "Gum Gum".

== Critical reception ==
Lala Belu was met with "universal acclaim" reviews from critics. At Metacritic, which assigns a weighted average rating out of 100 to reviews from mainstream publications, this release received an average score of 81 based on 12 reviews. Aggregator Album of the Year gave the release a 73 out of 100 based on a critical consensus of 7 reviews. At AnyDecentMusic?, the release was rated 7.2 out of 10 based on 10 reviews.

Timothy Monger of AllMusic described the album as a "lovely and deeply creative record", while explaining "touching on myriad emotions throughout its six tracks, the album is bright and joyful at times and occasionally funky while frequently veering into the more cerebral and introspective territory that marked his early solo years."

=== Accolades ===
Accolades for Lala Belu
Publication	Accolade	Rank
AllMusic	AllMusic's Favourite Latin and World Albums	N/A
Mojo	Mojo's Top 75 Albums of 2018	72
Passion of the Weiss	Passion of the Weiss' Top 50 Albums of 2018	42
Pitchfork	Pitchfork's 200 Best Albums of the Decade (2010s)	185
The Wire	The Wire's Top 50 Albums of 2018	29

== Track listing ==
Lala Belu track listing
No.	Title	Length
1.	"Tizita"	10:00
2.	"Addis Nat"	4:34
3.	"Gum Gum"	6:47
4.	"Anchihoye Lene"	7:06
5.	"Lala Belu"	4:42
6.	"Yefikir Engurguro"	6:15

== Personnel ==
Musicians

- Hailu Mergia – primary artist, producer
- Tony Buck – drums
- Mike Majkowski – bass

Production

- Javon Gant – engineer
- Jessica Thompson – mastering
