= Obaa Sima =

- LP cover for the 2015 reissue

Studio album by Ata Kak
- Released: 1994
- Genre: Highlife; Electro-funk; Hip hop (Hiplife)
- Length: 34:59
- Label: Self-released (originally); Awesome Tapes From Africa

Obaa Sima is the debut studio album by Ghanaian singer Ata Kak. Originally self-released in 1994, only 50 copies of the album were made, of which 3 were sold. The album initially gathered no attention until record label Awesome Tapes From Africa founder Brian Shimkovitz came across one of the only copies of the album from a vendor in Cape Coast, Ghana in 2002. The album was finally re-released on 3 March 2015.

The album was recorded using secondhand drum-machine rhythms along with built-in synth sounds, sounding like dance beats made in the 80s and 90s and was recorded in his own living room and bathroom. The original tracks of the DAT copy of the album (discovered by Shimkovitz) was sped up by Ata himself in post-production, giving the music a rough but helium-like quality.

Obaa Sima has since gathered massive attention and critique for its dynamic blend of highlife, electro-funk, and hip hop across its 7 tracks, which was unlike anything of its time. As of 2022, the album's songs in total has been streamed more than 8 million times on Spotify and has helped Ata Kak resume his passion for music commercially.

== Background ==
Ata Kak (Yaw Atta-Owusu), a drummer from Kumasi who started out playing in a Toronto-based trio band Marijata (unrelated from the 70s band of the same name) after moving to the city in 1989. The band mainly focused on making covers of highlife songs. They released three albums, which greatly contributed to Ata Kak making music on his own. By 1991, using Notator Atari, a synthesizer and a secondhand 12-track recorder, he started to record his own songs.

Obaa Sima, according to an undisclosed friend by Ata Kak who has a conversational grasp of the Ghanaian language Twi, suggested that the title could possibly mean 'Perfect Woman.'

== Recording and production ==
Its positive shine, relentless energy, and alien earworm choruses feel like a portal to an alternate reality, where the sounds of South Africa’s Shangaan electro, Mali’s Balani Show, Syria’s dabke, British grime, and Portuguese kuduro all sweat together.

— Fact Magazine on Obaa Sima.

The album is a dynamic blend (or experimentation) of highlife, electro-funk, and hip hop, the latter of which Ata Kak loved since seeing Grandmaster Flash on television in the 80s. It is built upon secondhand drum-machine rhythms along with built-in synth sounds and was recorded in his own living room and bathroom. Obaa Sima also is reminiscent of DIY versions of Michael Jackson's hits and Public Enemy's early cuts. He initially started rapping in English, before realizing that his flow was much better when he rhythmed in the Ghanaian language Twi.

The original tracks of the DAT copy of the album was sped up by Ata himself in post-production, giving the music a rough but helium-like quality.

In an interview with The Boston Globe, Ata Kak stated that "[he] invested [his] time and money to make this album, and [he] was expecting some good results" and also insisted that "When you're young, you're looking for fame. But after it came out, the response was silence. I didn't hear anything, and it turned me off for a while. I was frustrated."

=== Singles ===
The opening track of Obaa Sima sets the basis of a blend of 80s and 90s dance beats, lo tech and old school, overlaid with female backing chants and scattershot rapping in his native language of Twi, although the supposed female voices could be sped-up Ata Kak himself. The track's vocal delivery is considerably fast, which continues onto the next track 'Moma Yendodo'.

All seven total tracks of the album are also considerably catchy, even though the rhythms might have been preset-generated due to the songs' palette being relatively basic on a surface level. The only exception is the closing track 'Bome Nnwom', which features no rapping or singing at all.

== Release ==
After finishing the album, Ata send over the recording to his brother, who duplicated about 50 copies on cassette. The album, released in 1994, only sold three copies and quickly went unknown. It was never played on the radio, and Ata never played a show for the album in Ghana, only one in Canada. It wasn't until Awesome Tapes From Africa founder Brian Shimkovitz happened to come across an cassette copy of Obaa Sima at a roadside stall in front of a Standard Chartered Bank in Cape Coast, Ghana in 2003 that the album would start to get widespread attention. More specifically in 2006, where he would showcase this copy of the album on his first ever blog post, gathering attention from the internet.

Despite all of the buzz created on the internet, no one was exactly sure who it was that produced and recorded Obaa Sima. It would only be countless phone calls and searching endlessly on Google that Shimkowitz would finally track down Ata Kak. It was revealed that Ata had recorded the album in Toronto before returning to Ghana. Despite that, restoring the original tape provided to be difficult, as the tape was badly damaged; so Shimkovitz brought a second copy and used it as the source for the reissue.

=== Reissue and aftermath ===
The album was reissued on 2 March 2015 on CD, LP, vinyl and later digital formats. through the record label Awesome Tapes From Africa and distributed by Differ-Ant in France. Since 2022, the album's songs in total has been streamed more than 8 million times on Spotify and has shaped Ata Kak's music career for the better.

On 29 September 2017, in partnership with Awesome Tapes From Africa, the Red Bull Music Academy released a documentary detailing Brian Shimkovitz's quest to find the unknown musician after he found Ata Kak's cassette tape Obaa Sima.

== Track listing ==
Credits adapted from Tidal. All lyrics and music were written and produced by Yaw Atta-Owusu.

Obaa Sima track listing
| No. | Title | Length |
|---|---|---|
| 1. | "Obaa Sima" | 5:38 |
| 2. | "Moma Yendodo" | 5:32 |
| 3. | "Adagya" | 4:54 |
| 4. | "Medofo" | 2:49 |
| 5. | "Daa Nyinaa" | 6:07 |
| 6. | "Yemmpa Aba" | 4:30 |
| 7. | "Bome Nnwom" | 5:26 |
| Total length: | | 34:59 |

== Work cited ==
Primary sources

- Schaffer, Noah (28 September 2022). "How Ata Kak's long-forgotten 'Awesome Tape' turned into an awesome tour 30 years later". The Boston Globe.
- ""Kind of A Manifesto"--Awesome Tapes From Africa's Brian Shimkovitz on Releasing "Obaa Sima"". Afropop Worldwide (Interview). Interviewed by Backer, Sam. 20 March 2015.

Secondary sources

- Frame, Charlie (26 March 2015). "Ata Kak | Obaa Sima". The Quietus.
