= Penny Penny =

South African musician and politician

- Born: Eric Kulani Giyani Nkovani; 1962 (age 63–64); Limpopo
- Genres: Tsonga disco; House•Kwaito
- Occupations: Musician; singer; songwriter; politician; television personality
- Instruments: Vocals; synthesisers
- Years active: 1994–present

Penny Penny

Member of the National Assembly of South Africa
- Incumbent
- Assumed office 2024

Personal details
- Party: uMkhonto weSizwe Party

Eric Kulani Giyani Nkovani or Gezani Kobane (born 1962), better known by his stage names Penny Penny and Papa Penny is a South African musician and politician, known affectionately as the "Shangaan Disco King" for the musical style he helped popularise.

== Biography ==
He was the youngest of 68 children from a local traditional Surgeon/ doctor with 25 wives. His family was poor, meaning he received no education, but he soon became known for his dancing and was nicknamed Penny. Aged 19, he worked on a West Driefontein goldmine near Carletonville, and soon left to escape the region's poor working conditions, although he won several breakdancing trophies before his departure. His breakthrough came with the recording and release of his 1994 debut album Shaka Bundu, which was recorded in a week using little gear but went on to sell 250,000 copies in the country. The music features Tsonga (or Shangaan) disco sound, which emerged in Penny's native Tsonga culture, fused with contemporary house music from the United States. Unusually, the songs on the album were recorded in the Tsonga or Xitsonga language, or more specifically its Limpopo-region dialect Xishangana, one of the least-heard languages in South Africa. This was a conscious choice on behalf of Penny, who wanted to introduce his language "to the world." He stayed in Peta Teanet 's mansion in Tzaneen for 3 months while he was being taught music by the King of Disco Peta Teanet.

== Career ==
He recorded several further albums, including Laphinda Shangaan (1997) and Makanjta Jive (1998), both of which outsold Shaka Bundu, although none of his albums were distributed outside of South Africa, and he soon drifted into obscurity as the country's music trends moved on. Shaka Bundu was re-released worldwide by Awesome Tapes From Africa, which helped renew his musical popularity. His newfound popularity spread to the clubs of Los Angeles. In 2017, he began creating music in a style he called "heavy gum," after growing tired of being referred to as the "Shangaan Disco King". He said: "I never labelled myself as Shangaan Disco King, other people did. I am tired of people knowing me only because of my language. Music is more than the language you speak." His first single in the style was "Goldie Bone."

As a politician, Penny worked in the African National Congress (ANC) as a council member. He entered a publicised long-running spat with a chief based in Giyani over an initiative for free water, explaining that he "entered into a partnership with a local farmer to help provide water to the community but was apparently stopped from implementing the plan by the chief."

Since 2017, he also stars in his own reality series Penny Ahee on Mzansi Magic, which was commissioned after a successful appearance as a judge on Clash of the Choirs.

Penny Penny is married and has 25 children, with 23 of them from previous relationships.

In 2024, Penny left the ANC to join uMkhonto weSizwe (MKP), and was elected as a member of the National Assembly in the 2024 South African general election.

Penny resigned from MKP in May 2026, citing infighting and attacks from within the party. He joined the Afrika Mayibuye Movement shortly after.

== Discography ==
- Shaka Bundu (1994)
- Yogo Yogo (1996)
- Makajanta Jive (1997)
- La Phinda Ishangaane (1997)
- "Juri Juri" (1998)
- Bum Bum (1999)
- Viyana Viyana (2000)
- The King of Tamakhwaya 1 (2001)
- The King of Tamakhwaya 2 (2002)
- The King vs the General (2009, collaborated with General Muzka)
- Pachi (2024)

== See also ==
- List of National Assembly members of the 28th Parliament of South Africa
