= Hailu Mergia =

Ethiopian keyboardist (born 1946)

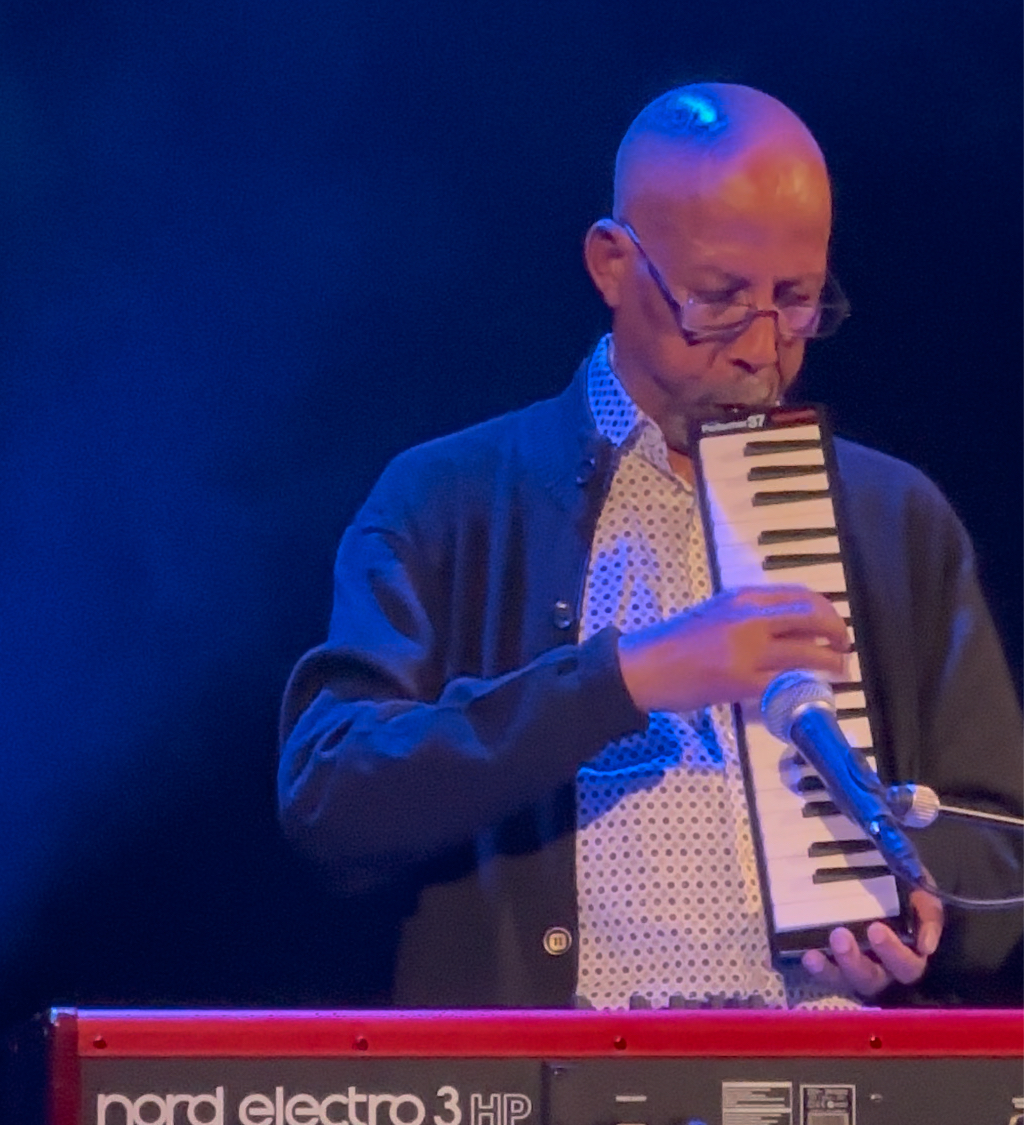
- Hailu Mergia performing at Perth Town Hall for Perth Festival, Western Australia, 2025

Background information
- Born: 1946 (age 79–80); Debre Birhan, Ethiopia
- Genres: Jazz; Ethio-jazz; Funk
- Occupation: Musician
- Instruments: keyboard, accordion, melodica

Hailu Mergia (Amharic: ኃይሉ መርጊያ, romanized: ḫayilu merigīya) is an Ethiopian keyboardist, accordionist, composer, and arranger now based in Washington D.C., United States. He is known for his role in the Walias Band in the 1970s, one of the most significant groups in Ethiopia's "golden age" of music.

== Biography ==
=== Early life ===
Hailu Mergia was born in 1946 in Debre Birhan, Shewa, Amhara and moved to Addis Ababa at age 10. He grew up on traditional Amhara songbook melodies, and taught himself the accordion at age 14. In 1952, when he was 14, he dropped out of high school and joined the army music department to support his family. He stayed for two years in the army, where he learned how to read and write music. Then, he became a freelance musician, touring around nightclubs in Ethiopia before meeting future members of the Walias Band at the venue Zula Club and leading the formation of the band.

=== Career ===
Hailu's mastering of the accordion, as well as the keyboard and his talent for "re-purposing folk songs into funkier modern melodies," defined his contribution to popular music in Ethiopia. In the 1970s, Hailu Mergia was the keyboardist in the Walias Band, a jazz and funk band with a hard polyrhythmic funk sound influenced by western artists like King Curtis, Junior Walker and Maceo Parker. In the period, it was harder for working bands in the region to make a living, after Mengistu's Derg government imposed breaks to Addis Ababa's nightlife, but music was still being regularly recorded, and cassettes were the typical release format, given they were easy to duplicate and distribute. Walias Band had a 10-year residency at Addis's Hilton hotel in this period.

Due to the Derg dictatorship, censorship was often a problem for the area's musicians, but Hailu acknowledged one way around censorship was to only create instrumentals. He later noted: "When you sing or write lyrics you have to support the government, and if you don't do that then you have a problem." Ethiopian music was typically led by a vocalist: just three instrumental albums were released during Addis’ 'golden age' of music, including one of Hailu's landmark albums with the Walias Band, Tche Belew (1977). As a side project, Hailu joined the Dhalak Band around this period and recorded the cassette-only Wede Harer Guzo (1978) with them, a jazz-infused album with a dominance of improvisation. Hailu's organ work for the band was one of the Walias Band's key characteristics, but during a 1980s tour of the United States, Hailu and several other members decided to stay in the US, effectively ending the band's career, although their legacy in Ethiopia was strong by this point, especially via their 1977 instrumental "Muziqawi Silt."

It was only several years after moving to the US that Hailu recorded a new album, Hailu Mergia & His Classical Instrument, in 1985, during which point he was playing with the Zula Band. Hailu recorded the album alone in a small studio belonging to an acquaintance that Hailu met at Howard University, where he had begun studying music.

He stopped performing in 1991 and opened a restaurant. From 1998 Hailu worked as a taxi driver, mostly based around Washington DC's Dulles Airport, but continued to write music in his spare time: “After I drop my customer, I grab my keyboard from the trunk and sit in the car and practice.”

=== Career revival ===
Hailu Mergia & His Classical Instrument was re-released in 2013 on the Awesome Tapes From Africa label, after the label's owner discovered the album in a cassette bin. This album was followed up in 2016 with a re-release of "Wede Harer Guzo", which translates roughly to "Journey/Travel to Harar", a town in Eastern Ethiopia. Wede Harer Guzo became his most popular release yet, with the track "Anchin Kfu Ayinkash" reaching over 12 million streams as of 2025. In 2018, his first new record in over three decades, Lala Belu, was released on the same label, with Hailu accompanied by Mike Majkowski and Tony Buck. This was followed in 2020 by a full-band album, Yene Mircha. Hailu also returned to live performance in this period.

== Discography ==
=== Studio albums ===
- Tezeta (1975)
- Tche Belew (1977)
- Wede Harer Guzo (1978)
- Hailu Mergia & His Classical Instrument (1985)
- Lala Belu (2018)
- Yene Mircha (2020)
