= Hailu Mergia & His Classical Instrument =

Studio album by Hailu Mergia
- Released: 1985
- Genres: Ethio-jazz; electro-jazz; psychedelic
- Length: 59:19
- Label: Kaifa
- Producer: Hailu Mergia

Hailu Mergia chronology
| Wede Harer Guzo (1978) | Hailu Mergia & His Classical Instrument (1985) | Yewedeke Abeba (1998) |

Hailu Mergia & His Classical Instrument (Amharic: ኃይሉ መርጊያና የመሣረያ ቅንብሮቹ), also known as Shemonmuanaye, is a 1985 studio album by Ethiopian jazz musician Hailu Mergia, formerly of the Walias Band. After the band split up in 1983, Mergia moved to the United States and began studying music at Howard University, during which time he discovered an accordion and began playing it. Initially intending to record a cassette of himself playing the accordion in a small studio belonging to an acquaintance at Howard, he also incorporated other instruments in the studio, such as a Rhodes piano and synthesiser.

Using all three instruments and a drum machine, he recorded His Classical Instrument to showcase his mastery of the accordion, an instrument which reminded him of his youth – and which had lost popularity in Ethiopia since the 1950s – with the hopes of bringing it back to prominence. Via the inclusion of modern instruments, the album was also intended to mix the old accordion style with the modern technology of the United States. Originally released in Ethiopia on cassette by Kaifa Records, the album was a surprise hit when listeners warmed to its unusual sound, though, as was often the case with Mergia's music, the album was unheard outside of the country, and he soon slipped into obscurity.

When Brian Shimkovitz, founder of the American reissue label Awesome Tapes From Africa, discovered a copy of the album in Ethiopia in 2013, he hoped to re-release it on his label, and contacted Mergia, who greenlit the project. Upon its re-release in various formats by the label that same year, the album received critical acclaim, with Western critics complimenting its uniquely psychedelic and dreamy sound. The success of the album relaunched Mergia's international touring career, which had ceased several decades earlier, and brought him international recognition. The label would later re-release further cassettes of Mergia's music.

== Background ==
Having settled in Addis Ababa at the age of 10, Hailu Mergia had grown up on traditional Oromo, Amhara, and Tigrinya songbook melodies, and taught himself the accordion at age 14. His mastering of the accordion, as well as the keyboard and his talent for "re-purposing folk songs into funkier modern melodies," defined his contribution to popular music in Ethiopia. In the 1970s, Hailu Mergia was the keyboardist in the Walias Band, an Ethiopian jazz and funk band with a hard polyrhythmic funk sound influenced by western artists like King Curtis, Junior Walker, and Maceo Parker. In the period, it was harder for working bands in the region to make a living, after Mengistu's Derg government-imposed breaks to Addis Ababa's nightlife, but the music was still being regularly recorded, and cassettes were the typical release format, given they were easy to duplicate and distribute.

Due to the Derg dictatorship, censorship was often a problem for the area's musicians, but Mergia acknowledged one way around censorship was to only create instrumentals. He later noted: "When you sing or write lyrics you have to support the government, and if you don’t do that then you have a problem." Ethiopian music was typically led by a vocalist, and fewer than five instrumental albums were released during the 'golden age' of Addis' music, one of which by was one of Mergia's landmark albums with the Walias Band, Tche Belew (1977). As a side project, Mergia joined the Dhalak Band around this period and recorded the cassette-only Wede Harer Guzo (1978) with them, a jazz-infused album with a dominance of improvisation. Mergia's organ work for the band was one of the Walias Band's key characteristics, but during a 1980s tour of the United States, Mergia and several other members decided to stay in the US, effectively ending the band's career, although their legacy in Ethiopia was strong by this point, especially via their 1977 instrumental "Muziqawi Silt."

It was only several years after moving to the US that Mergia recorded a new album, Hailu Mergia & His Classical Instrument, in 1985, during which point he was playing with the Zula Band. Hailu recorded the album alone in a small studio. The studio belonged to an acquaintance that Mergia met at Howard University, where he had begun studying music, and the impetus for the album was picking up an accordion, an "instrument he hadn't touched in decades." Mergia said his initial plan for the album was to "just record [some] accordion for myself, just to listen," but he ditched the plan when he "couldn't keep his hands off" the small studio's Rhodes electric piano and DX7 synthesiser too. He recorded the eleven, largely improvised tracks that make up the album in three days.

== Composition ==
=== Concept and instrumentation ===
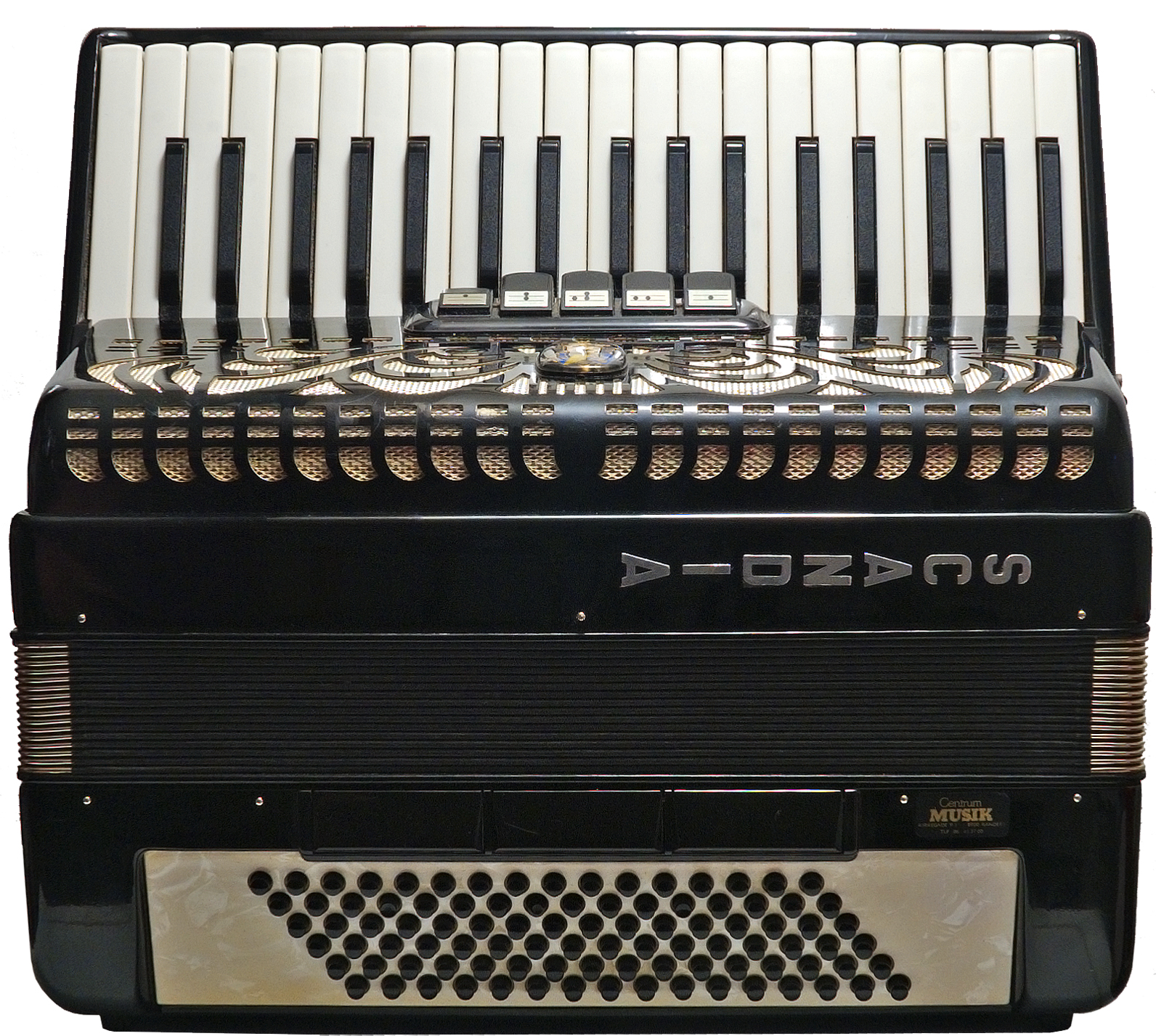
The album is dominated by the accordion and was intended to help raise the instrument's popularity in Ethiopia.

Mergia set out to create an album which merged the music of his youth with modern music technology. For the album, he worked alone and used his accordion, a Rhodes piano, a drum machine, and, according to contrasting accounts, a Yamaha DX7 keyboard or Moog synthesiser (or both), and arranged a set of old Ethiopian songs with the mostly modern selection of instruments. Writer Donal Dineen wrote that the album was a "step into the unknown," given its fusion of a sound familiar to Mergia with "modern technology that was dramatically altering the musical landscape in the US." Via its dominance on the instruments he listened to and perfected in his younger days, Mergia intended for the album to be an exercise in nostalgia. Music critic Robert Christgau wrote that the album recaptures the modal melodies of Mergia's youth.

The accordion is one of the dominant instruments on the album, and the "classical instrument" referred to in the title. The instrument had not featured in the majority of popular Ethiopian music for decades, given that it had been usurped by amplified instruments since the accordion's 1950s heyday. Mergia felt that many people in Ethiopia had fond memories of the accordion and the popular songs that featured it, and intended the album to bring the instrument to prominence again. Via the inclusion of the electric and electronic instruments though, it was assured the album would not be a mere throwback to the older accordion style. On the album, the accordion has been said to resemble the squeezeboxes of the 1950s, thus being consistent with the accordion music Mergia grew up with. Nonetheless, Australian news website ABC felt the album had the electric organ at its core, and noted its influence from the Ethiopian jazz scene from which Mergia originated.

=== Musical style ===
Hailu Mergia & His Classical Instrument is an instrumental album, in which Mergia alternately solos in an Ethiopian style on either his accordion or the keyboard. Behind these solos, he uses the keyboard to create buzzy bass lines and the Rhodes piano to apply chords and texture, while the drum machine patterns refrain from deviating during the tracks, although Mergia occasionally augments the "rhythmic push" with a style of vocals "halfway between beatboxing and chanting." The material takes from both traditional and contemporary Ethiopian songs, and Mergia matches Oromo, Amhara and Tigrinya melodies to "otherworldly flavors" styled in jazz and blues, balancing the iconic pentatonic modes and melodic shape of Ethiopian music with analog synthesisers. Beyond the modal melodies, other distinctive Ethiopian characteristics throughout the album include the tracks' triple metres and "three-against-four" rhythms.

The result is an album that has been referred to as a fusion between traditional Ethiopian melodies and "blessed-out" electro-jazz. Several have described the music as psychedelic, with the Washington City Paper calling the album a "thoroughly psychedelic interpretation of traditional acoustic Ethiopian music." Christgau disagreed with the notions of the album being psychedelic or futuristic, instead finding it to be "spare, nostalgic, and passing strange," and describing it as a type of cocktail music that, unlike other examples of the genre, possesses a very different tune base and what he felt was "the necessity of reducing music Americans now know primarily from Éthiopiques horn bands to simple pattern, momentary idiosyncrasy, and painful longing." ABC called the album a mix of "rigid pre-programmed rhythms, supple organ licks and left field synth whooshes." The Wire described the album's sound as "Ethio-Kosmische," while Joe Tangari of Pitchfork similarly described the album as the Ethiopian equivalent to German krautrock band Cluster.

Given the album's modal accordion melodies accompanying squelchy synth bass and "rinky-dink rhythm box grooves," parts of the album were said by The List to suggest a "DIY bedroom pop take on the great Mulatu Astatke's mellow yet mysterious Ethio-jazz." "Belew Beduby" features a 6/8 beat boasting a swaying polyrhythm as well as quirky funk-styled synth riffs, and "Sewnetuwa" features a bassline reminiscent of later day chiptune music, with a "dueling" between the accordion and Yamaha DX7, while "Hebo Lale" adopts a faster tempo than other songs and a boogie feel.

== Release and rediscovery ==
Mergia mailed the master recording of Hailu Mergia & His Classical Instrument to the Addis Ababa record label Kaifa Records, who released it on cassette in Ethiopia in 1985, with a cover that depicts Mergia half-smiling while surrounded by keyboards. The album was a surprise success in the country, and Ethiopian people phoned Mergia to ask him "What is this music?". Nonetheless, Mergia's output had always been and continued to be widely unheard of outside of Ethiopia. Following the album's release, Mergia faded into relative obscurity. While he continued to play parties, restaurants, and weddings with the Zula Band, the band broke up in 1992 or 1993 and he stopped playing live gigs at this point, mostly retiring from music.

In January 2013, Brian Shimkovitz, founder of Awesome Tapes from Africa (an American label which reissues obscure African cassettes for a Western market), stumbled across a copy of Hailu Mergia & His Classical Instrument in a music shop in Bahir Dar, Ethiopia, whose staff let him listen to many of the cassettes on sale. Shimkovitz "freaked out completely" when he heard it and listened to it twice in a row. He recalled: "It sounds like no other Ethiopian music I've heard. Analogue synths, a simple drum machine and accordion (and no vocals)." Hoping to re-release the album on his label, he set out to locate Mergia by Googling him, being surprised to quickly find his mobile number. By this point, Mergia had been working as a taxi driver in Washington for 10 years. He was very interested in working with Shimkovitz on the re-release.

Awesome Tapes from Africa subsequently re-released Hailu Megia & His Classical Instrument on 25 June 2013 in the United States as a CD, LP, cassette and download. Shimkovitz said that the re-release "sold very well" and wrote that "people all over the world have responded positively" to the album's unusual style. It was with the re-release that Mergia's output became better known to the wider world. Having not played live for some 20 years, Mergia missed touring, and the album's re-release caused the 67-year-old musician to wonder what performing music outside his Washington home would be like. Nonetheless, the success of the album's re-release allowed Mergia to relaunch his international touring career. Mergia built a friendship with Shimkovitz, and following the success of the re-release, Awesome Tapes from Africa re-released two more Mergia albums, 1977's Tche Belew (an instrumental jazz album by Mergia and the Walias Band) in 2015 and the 1978 cassette Wede Harer Guzo in 2016. Mergia's first album of new material since 2003, Lala Belu, was released on the label in February 2018.

== Reception and legacy ==
Professional ratings
Review scores
| Source | Rating |
|---|---|
| The List | 4/5 stars |
| MSN Music (Expert Witness) | A− |
| Pitchfork | 7.4/10 |
| Tom Hull | A− |

Praise greeted Hailu Mergia & His Classical Instrument in the West following its 2013 re-release. Joe Tangari of Pitchfork was favourable, calling the album's sound "difficult to describe." He wrote: "The music is simple and straightforward, accomplished but not showy. It feels at once rural, nostalgic, and futuristic. Replace the drum machine with people clapping, and you’d be a hair’s breadth from an ethnographic recording." Daniel Spicer in The Wire called the album "a prescient yet ancient sound that proposes a unique kind of Ethio-Kosmische." Writing for MSN Music, Robert Christgau gave the album an A− score, indicating "the kind of garden-variety good record that is the great luxury of musical micromarketing and overproduction. Anyone open to its aesthetic will enjoy more than half its tracks." Stewart Smith of The List called the re-release "another gem" from the Awesome Tapes from Africa label, and complimented the album's dreamy, blessed-out sound.

Chris Richards of The Washington Post recalled how the cassette "meshed the sound of a forgotten folk instrument with strange, futuristic timbres" and called it an album "that simultaneously pointed toward Ethiopia’s musical past and future." In 2015 The Irish Times named the album a "Sunken Treasure" and called it "a deeply progressive meditation on something historical and personal. The hypnotic tunes are soothed by occasional flourishes of gentle songcraft from a voice so warm it could have been stirred up on some savannah breeze aeons ago." Jon Pareles of the New York Times wrote: "With the unswerving patterns from the drum machine, the music came across as an eerie, isolated rumination on a place and time Mr. Mergia had left behind, with its Ethiopian modes and melodies transplanted to a modern terra incognita." Fact Magazine later ranked the album at number 5 on their list of "The 50 best reissues of 2013," where they called it "serpentine Ethiopian jazz" which "trades in the usual folk instruments for big fat beefy synth leads. Comfort food, prime for scoffing."

The album captured the point in which Ethiopian music shifted away from acoustic-based performances and more towards recordings incorporating an increasing amount of synthesised elements. While this general shift in the country's music was criticised by some, Mergia's initial experimentation with instrumental, "switched-on" solo reinterpretations of Ethiopian folk and popular music contributes what Shimkovitz called "a singular feeling dripping in ambiance and a very human emotional energy." April Clare Welsh of Fact Magazine called it "a vital document of Ethiopian musical history." By the time of the album's re-release, synthesizers and drum machines had become common instruments within Ethiopian pop music, albeit in a different fashion than that on His Classical Instrument. Tangari felt one of the aspects which separates the Mergia album from other Ethiopian music "is the fact that it was made in solitude, and specifically out of longing for a vanished past. It's introverted in a way very little other music from the country is. It's also not quite like anything else you’ve ever heard." Shimkovitz calls the album "one of my all-time favourite tapes."

== Track listing ==
=== Original cassette release ===
Side one

1. "ሸሞንሟናዬ"
2. "ሰውነቷ"
3. "ላሎዬ"
4. "ወገኔ"
5. "ሀሪ መሩ መሩ"

Side two

6. "አምረው ደምቀው"
7. "አንቺን አላይ አለኝ"
8. "አምባሰል"
9. "ሄቦ ላሌ"
10. "በለው በዱባይ"
11. "ሽለላ"

=== CD version (2013) ===
1. "Shemonmuanaye" – 6:40
2. "Sewnetuwa" – 6:08
3. "Laloye" – 5:56
4. "Wegene" – 5:29
5. "Hari Meru Meru" – 5:46
6. "Amrew Demkew" – 6:32
7. "Anchin Alay Alegn" – 6:27
8. "Ambasel" – 3:49
9. "Hebo Lale" – 4:43
10. "Belew Beduby" – 4:25
11. "Shilela" – 3:24

== Personnel ==
- Hailu Mergia – accordion, keyboard, electric piano, drum machine
