= Shaka Bundu =

Studio album by Penny Penny
- Released: 1994
- Studio: Shandel Studios, Johannesburg
- Genre: Tsonga disco; house; synthpop
- Length: 41:58
- Language: Xitsonga
- Label: Shandel Music
- Producer: Joe Shirmani

Penny Penny chronology
Shaka Bundu (1994)	Yogo Yogo (1996)

Shaka Bundu is the debut album by South African musician Penny Penny, released in 1994. Recorded in one week, the album was created using an Atari computer, Korg M1 synthesizer, and reel-to-reel tape. It blends the Xitsonga disco style with American house music, reflecting the popularity of American and British electronic dance music in South Africa at the time. The album incorporates slow house rhythms, synthesized steel drum sounds, and vocal arrangements that include traditional call-and-response female backing vocals.

Released on cassette by Shandel Music, Shaka Bundu sold over 250,000 copies in South Africa and was certified double platinum. The lyrics are performed in a variation of Xitsonga, known as Xitsonga or Xihlanganu. The album increased public recognition for Penny Penny and producer Joseph Shirimani and has been associated with increased visibility for Xitsonga music within the Tsonga community. In 2013, the American record label Awesome Tapes From Africa re-released the album globally, which led to Penny Penny's return to live performances and new music recordings.

== Background and recording ==
Born in Limpopo in 1962, Giyani Kulani (Penny Penny) was the youngest of 68 children from a local doctor with 25 wives. His family was poor, and he did not attend school, but he became known for his dancing, earning the nickname Penny. In the 1980s, he began creating music he described as a fusion of traditional African music, breakdance and the musical style of Michael Jackson. At age 19, he worked on a West Driefontein gold mine near Carletonville, where he won breakdancing trophies, but soon returned home, citing the region's poor working conditions. He supported his music by working in gold mines and opening a restaurant. In the 1990s, Penny began working as a janitor in a Johannesburg recording studio belonging to South African musician Selwyn Shandel. Having no other place to sleep, he resided in the studio overnight. During his shifts, he discreetly taught himself how to operate recording equipment.

In 1994, during one of Penny's shifts, he performed a song for Afrobeat and Tsonga disco producer Joseph Shirimani, who was working in the studio with another artist. Impressed by his vocal style, Shirimani agreed to collaborate with him. Shirimani agreed to produce material for Penny, although his colleagues were initially hesitant, viewing Penny more as a comedic figure than a musical performer. Shirimani produced three demos for Penny. One of these, "Shaka Bundu", was inspired by a friend who spoke negatively about the singer to the latter's wife and then proposed to her.

The three demos impressed both Shirimani's colleagues and Shandel Music, the label with which Shirimani was affiliated. The label allowed Shirimani to produce a full album for Penny, also titled Shaka Bundu, which was recorded in a week. Shirimani produced the album and played keyboards, while Penny sang the lyrics. The album's female backing vocalists were later named the Shaka Bundu girls, who subsequently released their own album as a group. Additional backing vocals by the singer Momi appear on "Shichangani" and "Dance Khomela". The album's re-release credits Fraser Lesotho for engineering and David Solole for mixing.

== Composition ==
The music on Shaka Bundu fuses the Tsonga disco (or Shangaan disco) style – which originated from the Tsonga culture in northern South Africa – with contemporary house music from the United States. This house influence reflects the popularity of English and American dance-club hits in South Africa; journalist Milo Miles argues that this demonstrated to the country's musicians that a contemporary sound could be achieved by "plucky small studios and canny producers," contributing to a technological shift in the country's music production. Penny Penny cited Londonbeat's 1991 hit "I've Been Thinking About You" as an influence, while one writer also noted the possible influence from Soul II Soul, both in the music and in Penny's hairstyle, which is reminiscent of Jazzie B. The album has been described as having a rough, yet hooky feel, with Penny's "gruff" voice accompanying the music.

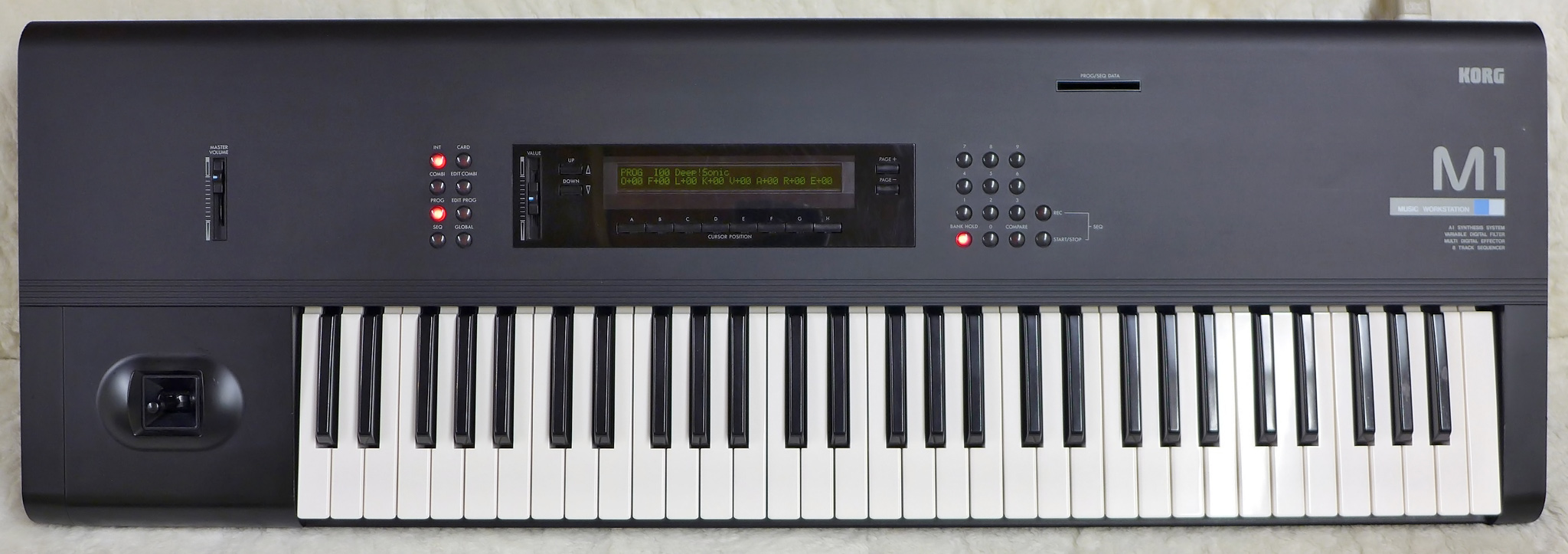
A Korg M1 synthesizer is used throughout the album.

The instrumentals were provided by Shirimani, who was inspired by Chicago house and blended the genre's deep bass and harsh piano, heard in the music of artists such as Larry Heard and Marshall Jefferson, with South African melodies. The call and response vocals on the album are also characteristic of South African music. The majority of the songs run at 100 beats per minute (bpm), and were recorded using a reel-to-reel tape, an Atari computer, and a Korg M1 synthesizer. Characteristic of Shirimani's production, the album features a static bass line displaying the root tones of an organ, described as having a "peculiar richness and depth." Fact Magazine described the album's musical style as "good-time house," comparing it to Inner City with "some added springbok flavor," while future collaborator Brian Shimkovitz described Shaka Bundu as a synth-pop album.

Penny presents what has been described as a "party vibe" throughout the album, which NPR characterized as "hearty but not frantic, more plain sexy than raunchy." The songs are primarily in the Xitsonga, specifically the Limpopo-region dialect Xihlanganu, one of the lesser-heard languages in South Africa. Penny explained: "When I made the demo everyone was like 'Na na na na na, don't like this.' But I wanted to introduce my language to the world." By using the Xitsonga language, Penny and Shirimani highlight their ethnic Tsonga identity. The lyrics call for positive feelings. Shimkovitz credits the album's slow tempo house rhythms, synthesized steel drum sounds, and Penny's rap-like vocals atop Tsonga-style female call-and-response vocals with creating a distinct style of Tsonga disco.

=== Songs ===
The opening song "Shichangani" has been described as an example of Tsonga disco, with one writer suggesting it departed from the low-budget, repetitive nature often found in the genre, introducing inventive variations of Tsonga disco. The title track was referred to by Shirimani as among the first songs to mix traditional South African melodies with dance-pop. Rolling Stone called it "an example of Tsonga (or Shangaan) Afro-disco" and wrote that it "updated traditional African music with synthesizers, electric guitars, and disco or house beats." The Guardian described the song as Afrobeat. The song was written about a friend of Penny's who proposed to Penny's girlfriend of eight years after she ended their relationship when he lost his job, and gave the album its name, a local term for "bad guy". One writer opined that "Ndzhihere Bhi" contains new wave-styled guitar figures reminiscent of the Cure. The only song with a faster tempo is "Dance Khomela", which contains elements of Italo house, and has been compared to Jinny's hit "Keep Warm".

== Release ==
The album Shaka Bundu was released in 1994 by Shandel Music as a cassette in South Africa. The title track, "Shaka Bundu", was released as a single and became a hit throughout South Africa. Shaka Bundu was a commercial success in the country, where it topped the South African Albums Chart and sold 250,000 copies. It was certified double platinum, and has been cited as potentially the best-selling album of Tsonga music ever. Several songs from the album featured music videos, including one for the title track. The success of Shaka Bundu performing entirely in the Tsonga language, which was not widely spoken nationally, was noted by NPR. Shirimani said of the single's success: "Jesus, it was unbelievable. Some people didn't know how to speak that language — it's a small nation. But it became a hit. The combination of traditional melodies with dance pop, that was something new." Penny explained his usage of the language on the album in retrospect:

"It was difficult in the country, because we have about 11 languages in South Africa. And then my tribe, the Xishangana, it was not easy. We used to take each other for granted in the country and [would ask ourselves] why we use this language: we thought it was something that was useless. But the time I break the market, it was very much unexpected. Everyone was paying attention."

Prior to the release of Shaka Bundu, Tsonga music was largely dominated by Paul Ndlovu and Peta Teanet, and was mainly played within the Northern Province. Shirimani recalled: "Shangaan people suffered from an inferiority complex and didn't want to be seen playing Shangaan music in their homes." The release of Shaka Bundu may have contributed to changing this attitude and introduced Shirimani as a new talent recognized for his Tsonga music productions, leading to numerous requests for collaboration. As a pop artist, Penny was visually distinguished by his hairstyle featuring elaborate topknots. Penny toured extensively throughout South Africa as piracy was prevalent in the country's record industry at the time, with one source suggesting one in three CDs in South Africa was pirated. He recorded several subsequent albums, including Laphinda Shangaan (1997) and Makanjta Jive (1998), which both outsold Shaka Bundu in the region. Despite his national success, his music was not widely distributed outside of South Africa, and its public profile decreased over time as the country's music trends shifted.

== Western rediscovery and re-release ==
In April 2010, American DJ and musicologist Brian Shimkovitz posted music from Shaka Bundu on his blog "Awesome Tapes from Africa", which specializes in posting music from rare African cassettes. He described it as: "The tape contains simple yet deep synth-pop anthems that couldn’t give a fuck if you thought they sounded corny at first. It’s that kind of tape." Shimkovitz had recently heard the cassette and believed it stood out from typical Tsonga disco due to Penny's distinctive raspy vocals, joyous songs, and Shirimani's American club music-influenced production. Shimkovitz also played material from the album during his Awesome Tapes from Africa DJ sets across the United States, Europe, Canada, and Australia, where audiences responded positively.

When the blog started a record label, also named Awesome Tapes From Africa, Shimkovitz sought to re-release the album on the label. He attempted to contact Penny Penny but could not locate him despite traveling to South Africa and inquiring locally. He eventually found Penny three years later, discovering he was working as a council member for the African National Congress. When the two spoke, Penny agreed to let Shimkovitz re-release the album. The singer expressed, "I never think this album can take me to America. Even now, I can't believe people there like it. To me it's like a dream." Shimkovitz and Penny agreed to split profits 50/50 from the re-release, and the singer traveled to the United States for the re-release's launch.

In September 2013, the label released several songs, including "Shichangani", as free downloads. These tracks proved popular with online audiences, particularly in Spain. The label then issued a worldwide re-release of Shaka Bundu on vinyl, CD, cassette, and as a download on 12 November 2013. Shimkovitz hoped the re-release's wider exposure would generate enough interest for Penny Penny to secure live performances abroad. Milo Miles of NPR noted the re-release exemplified the larger trend of Western labels introducing vintage African pop to new audiences. The album's re-release led to renewed international attention for Penny Penny and allowed him to earn profits from his music outside South Africa, where piracy continued to impact record sales. Penny explained: "I believe everything is in the hands of the gods – 'In the day, in the time, something good is going to happen for you, Penny Penny'." Penny stated he was pleased to note the album's positive reception among African and Australian audiences. He had been surprised to hear that his music had been popular in Australia for many years, and that organizers there had been trying to contact him for six years.

=== Reception and aftermath ===
Professional ratings
Review scores
Source	Rating
The List	4/5 stars

In reviews of the re-release, Stewart Smith of The List rated the album four out of five and noted that as a Tsonga/Shangaan disco album, it may appeal to those who enjoy the Shangaan electro style of Tshetsha Boys and Nozinja, a genre he felt was a more frenetically paced successor to Tsonga disco. He wrote: "Shaka Bundu is not just of historical interest, however. Music this joyful, melodic, and danceable will always be relevant." Fact Magazine wrote that the album boasts "a pleasantly rough feel, but Penny and his producer Joe Shirimani keep things sufficiently hooky and beefy to impress. Really corking stuff, in short." The album was further noted by Fact Magazine as being "one of the country's most feted house albums," and Sowetan LIVE called it a "seminal album." Anton Spice of The Vinyl Factory called the album "Penny Penny’s definitive Shangaan Disco record."

The re-release allowed Penny Penny to revive his musical career, leading to a string of international live shows including one with a ten-piece band in May 2014 at Tin Pan Alley, New York City, and one at the Sydney Opera House a month later. He released a new album, Siyayi Vuma, in 2016. Penny also starred in his own Mzansi Magic reality show, Papa Penny Ahee!, in 2017. Rolling Stone compared the surge in Penny's popularity to Sixto Rodriguez, an American folk singer who had success in South Africa but was thought to have been dead until the documentary Searching for Sugar Man corrected the myth and garnered Rodriguez attention in America.

== Track listing ==
=== Side one ===
1. "Shichangani" – 5:36
2. "Shibandza" – 5:29
3. "Ndzihere Bhi" – 5:47
4. "Dance Khomela" – 5:32

=== Side two ===
5. "Shaka Bundu" – 4:50
6. "Zirimini" – 5:05
7. "Milandu Bhe" – 4:27
8. "Shichangani" (Remix) – 5:12

== Personnel ==
- Penny Penny – vocals
- Joe Shirimani – producer, keyboards
- Fraser Lesotho – engineering
- David Solole – mixing
- Shaka Bundu girls – backing vocals
- Momi – backing vocals on "Shichangani" and "Dance Khomela"
