= Bernard Woma =

Ghanaian gyile player

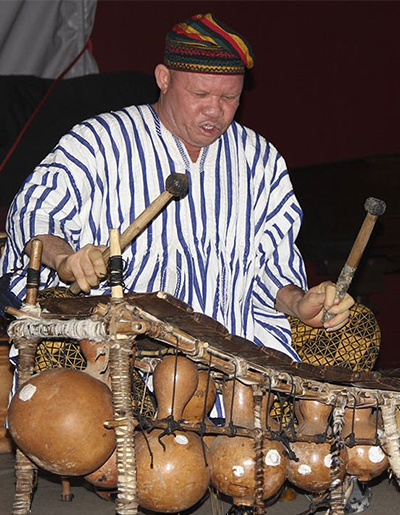
Ghanaian Musician Bernard Woma

Bernard Woma (18 December 1966 - 27 April 2018) was a well-known Dagara gyile player from Upper West Ghana who spent many years teaching the instrument and introducing it to audiences around the world. He was born in the village of Hiineteng, in the Upper West Region. Bernard began playing the gyil around 2 years old, and as he grew older he became well known for his musical abilities. In 1982, Bernard, moved to Accra and began to play the gyil for the Dagara community. Where he was later offered the position as a xylophonist for Ghana's National Dance Company. In 1997, he founded and became the artistic director of Saakumu Dance Troupe in Ghana. Bernard's guidance and leadership, attracted many people from around the world to come study from him. He was then invited as a guest at the State University of New York, where he earned a bachelor's degree in international studies and two master's degrees in African Studies and Ethnomusicology at Indiana University. He was xylophonist and lead drummer of the National Dance Company of Ghana and of Saakumu Dance Troupe. He performed with New York Philharmonic, South Dakota Symphony Orchestra, the Minnesota Orchestra and the Albany Symphony Orchestra as well as Berliner Symphoniker in Berlin, Germany, and KwaZulu Natal Symphony Orchestra in Durban, South Africa. He performed his gyil concerto composition "Gyil Nyog Me Na" in 2006 at Zankel Hall in Carnegie Hall, New York. He also founded Dagara Music and Arts Center in Accra, Ghana.

Signed to the Jumbie Records label, he released the live album Bernard Woma in Concert on the label in 2003. In 2009, he released the studio album Crossroad on the Chris Wabich label. He formed the Bernard Woma Ensemble with musicians Kofi Ameyaw and Mark Stone and master dancers Sulley Imoro and Peace Elewonu. Gyile is a type of West African xylophone, with seventeen keys constructed over gourds. It holds a place in the musical traditions of the Dagara and Birifor people of northern Ghana and southern Burkina Faso.

Woma was deeply committed to education, founding the Dagara Music and Arts Center in Accra, Ghana. The center became the hub for teaching traditional African instruments. In addition to his work in Ghana, Woma was a sought-after guest lecturer and teacher at universities and music institutions around the world. His teaching emphasized not only technical mastery but also the cultural and spiritual dimensions of African music. The center embodies his belief that cultural preservation required not just documentation, but active engagement and practical learning in an authentic environment.

== Early life ==
Benard Woma was born in Hiineteng, a village in the Upper West Region of Ghana. He grew up in a culturally rich environment where music and storytelling played an integral role in community life. As a child, Woma demonstrated an extraordinary talent for the gyil, learning from his elders and becoming proficient at a young age. Woma's formal education included studies at the University of Ghana's School of Performing Arts, where he deepened his understanding of traditional and contemporary African music. He later pursued further studies abroad, earning advanced degrees in ethnomusicology and performance.

== Bernard Woma Impact ==
Bernard Woma contributed to the promotion of African music and cultural exchange through his work at SUNY Fredonia, where he supported collaborations between the university and cultural institutions in Ghana. He taught traditional African music, directed the Saakumu Dance Troupe of Ghana, and served as master drummer for the Ghana Dance Company at the National Theatre. Woma also conducted performances and workshops with artists including Maya Angelou and Yo-Yo Ma, and met public figures such as Bill Clinton and Barack Obama during cultural events. His work as a performer, educator, and cultural ambassador contributed to the international recognition of Ghanaian musical traditions.

== Bernard Woma Preserving Culture Through Music ==
Bernard Woma is celebrated for his mastery and use of traditional African instruments, specifically the gyil, a single-row xylophone that is a symbol of Dagara's cultural identity. Newborn Woma was born with both fists clenched as if he were holding mallets, which in his culture symbolized and foreshadowed his passion and success as a musician. Born into a family with a love for music and dance, his grandfather and uncle played the Ghanaian xylophone and his father had a passion for dance. At age 2, he began to play the gyil, and over the years Woma played an important role in his community with his talent in playing the gyil, in 1992 he played for the Dagara community, and in 1999 he founded the Dagara Music Center in Ghana where he taught traditional music and arts. He spent his life traveling and sharing the DAGARA culture and traditional African music until he died in 2018 leaving behind the legacy of the artistic excellence of Dagara and African culture.

== Discography ==
=== Albums ===
- 2003: Crossroad duo with Chris Wabich
- 2007: Live at the Pito Bar
- 2009: Bernard Woma in Concert
- 2013: Missa Yielu (Dagara Catholic Mass)
- Before 2003: The Flow of Time
