= Awesome Tapes From Africa =

American independent record label

Awesome Tapes From Africa is a record label and website operated by Brian Shimkovitz, based in Los Angeles, California. The site was founded in 2006 in Brooklyn, New York.

== History ==
The site was created as a way for Shimkovitz to share music he had come across while on a Fulbright scholarship in Ghana. He was interested in the variety of genres and artists he found, distributed largely on cassette tapes at markets, but that he had not come across outside West Africa. In 2011, Shimkovitz transitioned the site from just a blog, in which he posted recordings of collected tapes without the artists' permission, to a commercial record label. The goal of the company is to seed and expand an audience for the artists presented as well as provide opportunities to sell albums and tour. Artists are paid every six months and receive 50% of the profits from an album. Tapes presented on Awesome Tapes come from a variety of sources: gathered in Ghanaian street markets, purchased in stores in the US, or sent by others over the internet. In addition to the website, Shimkovitz DJ's concerts, clubs and festivals as Awesome Tapes From Africa, as well as hosts a show on Dublab.

Most Awesome Tapes From Africa releases are official rereleases of out-of-print cassettes from African musicians and bands. SK Kakraba's Songs of Paapieye is the label's first new release. Although music is distributed in Africa via MP3 on mobile phones, Shimkovitz says the widest variety of music in West Africa is still available on cassette tapes. In the journal Public Culture, Awesome Tapes From Africa, along with record labels Sublime Frequencies and Parallel World, is discussed as being emblematic of "World Music 2.0" for combining the "open source ethics of online networks with long-standing countercultural networks of circulation" within cassette culture and music distribution in developing nations.

In her Beginner's Guide to Awesome Tapes from Africa, Asher White writes that "Most importantly, these particular tapes from Africa are, in fact, awesome; at best, they are utterly life-affirming. ...ATFA presents the work exactly as the artist intended, cover art and integrity intact."

== Artists ==
- Hailu Mergia
- Walias Band
- Dur-Dur Band
- Bola
- Penny Penny
- Aby Ngana Diop
- Ata Kak
- SK Kakraba

== Releases ==
- ATFA001 - Nahawa Doumbia: La Grande Cantatrice Malienne, Vol. 3, 2011
- ATFA002 - Bola: Volume 7, 2012
- ATFA003 - Bola: Remixes, 2012
- ATFA004 - Dur-Dur Band: Volume 5, 2013
- ATFA005 - Dur-Dur Band: Remixes, 2013
- ATFA006 - Hailu Mergia: Hailu Mergia & His Classical Instrument: Shemonmuanaye, 2013
- ATFA007 - Hailu Mergia: Remixes, 2013
- ATFA008 - Penny Penny: Shaka Bundu, 2013
- ATFA009 - Penny Penny: Remixes, 2014
- ATFA010 - Aby Ngana Diop: Liital, 2014
- ATFA011 - Aby Ngana Diop: Remixes, 2014
- ATFA012 - Hailu Mergia and the Walias: Tche Belew, 2014
- ATFA013 - Hailu Mergia and the Walias: Musicawi Silt b/w Tche Belew (single), 2015
- ATFA014 - Ata Kak: Obaa Sima (album), 2015
- ATFA015 - Ata Kak: Obaa Sima (single), 2015
- ATFA016 - Ata Kak: Daa Nyinaa (single), 2015
- ATFA018 - SK Kakraba: Songs of Paapieye, 2015
- ATFA019 - DJ Katapila: Trotro, 2016
- ATFA020 - Awalom Gebremariam: Desdes, 2016
- ATFA021 - Hailu Mergia & Dahlak Band: Wede Harer Guzo, 2016
- ATFA022 - DJ Katapila: Trotro (12"), 2016
- ATFA023 - DJ Katapila: Aroo (EP), 2018
- ATFA024 - Awa Poulo: Poulo Warali, 2017
- ATFA025 - Umoja: 707, 2017
- ATFA026 - "Om" Alec Khaoli: Say You Love Me, 2017
- ATFA027 - Professor Rhythm: Bafana Bafana, 2017
- ATFA028 - Hailu Mergia: Lala Belu, 2018
- ATFA028.5 - Hailu Mergia: Yegojam Mamesh (7"), 2018
- ATFA029 - Papé Nziengui: Kadi Yombo, 2022
- ATFA030 - Penny Penny: Yogo Yogo, 2020
- ATFA031 - Asnakech Worku: Asnakech, 2018
- ATFA032 - Professor Rhythm: Professor 3, 2018
- ATFA033 - Jess Sah Bi and Peter One: Our Garden Needs Its Flowers, 2018
- ATFA034 - Sourakata Koite: En Hollande, 2019
- ATFA035 - Nahawa Doumbia: La Grande Cantatrice Malienne Vol 1, 2019
- ATFA036 - Antoinette Konan: Antoinette Konan, 2019
- ATFA037 - Hailu Mergia: Yene Mircha, 2020
- ATFA038 - Ephat Mujuru and the Spirit Of The People: Mbavaira, 2021
- ATFA039 - Nahawa Doumbia: Kanawa, 2021
- ATFA040 - Teno Afrika: Amapiano Selections, 2021
- ATFA041 - Hailu Mergia with The Walias Band: Tezeta, 2021
- ATFA042 - DJ Black Low: Uwami, 2021
- ATFA043 - Native Soul: Teenage Dreams, 2021
- ATFA044 - DJ Black Low: Uwami II (12"), 2022
- ATFA045 - Teno Afrika: Where You Are, 2022
- ATFA046 - DJ Black Low: Impumelelo, 2023
- ATFA047 - Roger Bekono: Roger Bekono, 2023
- ATFA048 - Gibraltar Drakus: Hommage A Zanzibar, 2023
- ATFA049 - Hailu Mergia: Pioneer Works Swing (Live), 2023
- ATFA050 - Nahawa Doumbia: Vol. 2, 2024
- ATFA051 - Jess Sah Bi: Jesus-Christ Ne Deçoit Pas, 2025
- ATFA052 - Moskito: Idolar, 2025
- ATFA053 - Ata Kak: Batakari, 2025
