= Gyile =

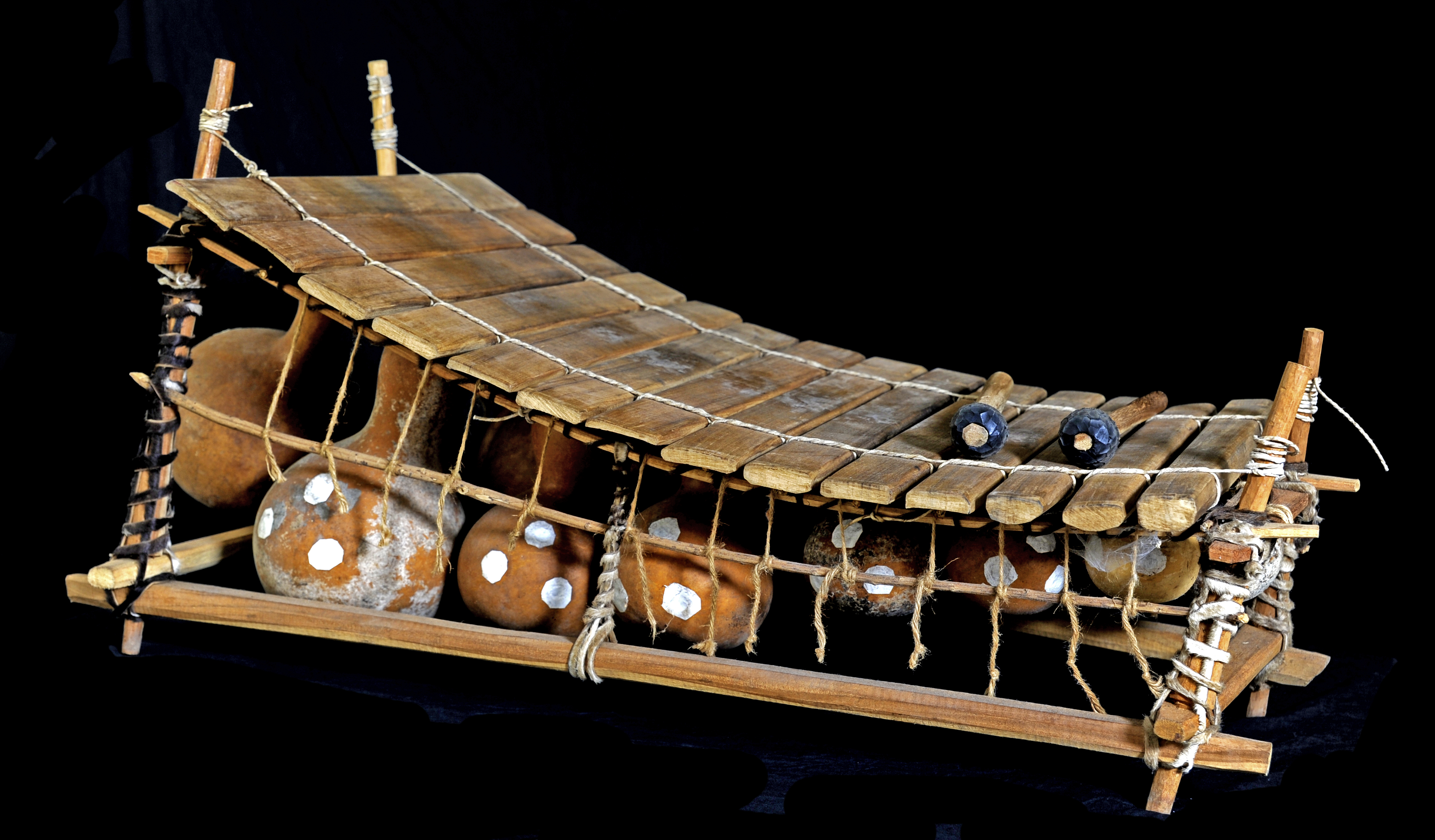
The gyil of northwestern Ghana

The gyile is a type of West African xylophone, with seventeen keys constructed over gourds. It holds a place in the musical traditions of the Dagara and Birifor people of northern Ghana and southern Burkina Faso.

Bernard Woma (d. 2018) was a well-known gyile player from Upper West Ghana who spent many years teaching the instrument and introducing it to audiences around the world.

== Playing Style ==
The gyile is played by striking the keys with a wooden mallet with rubber heads and is generally played by men but there are no restrictions on gender. The instrument is usually played in pairs and accompanied by a calabash gourd drum called kuor. It can also be played by one person with the drum and the stick part as accompaniment.

== Gallery ==
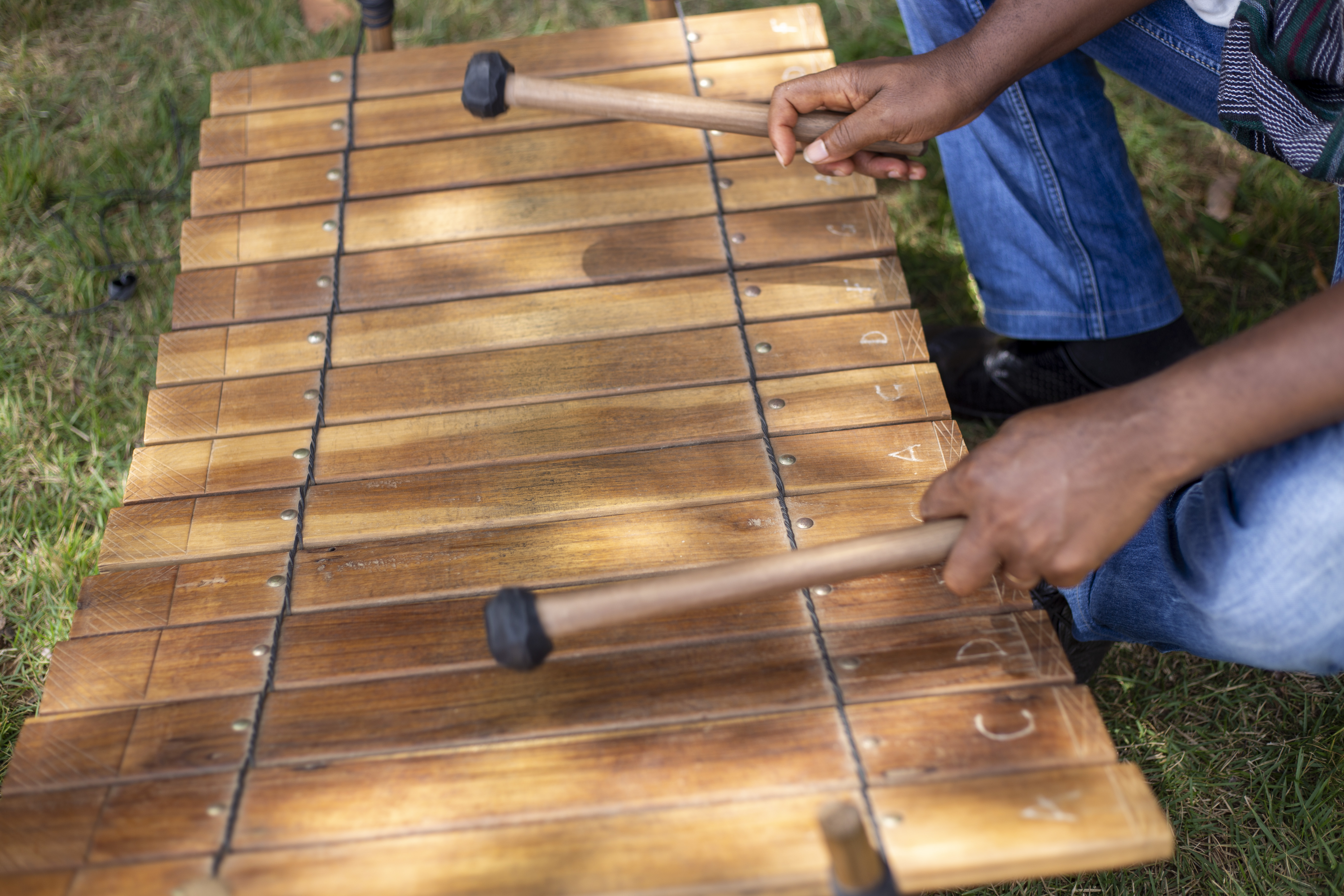
A player striking keys

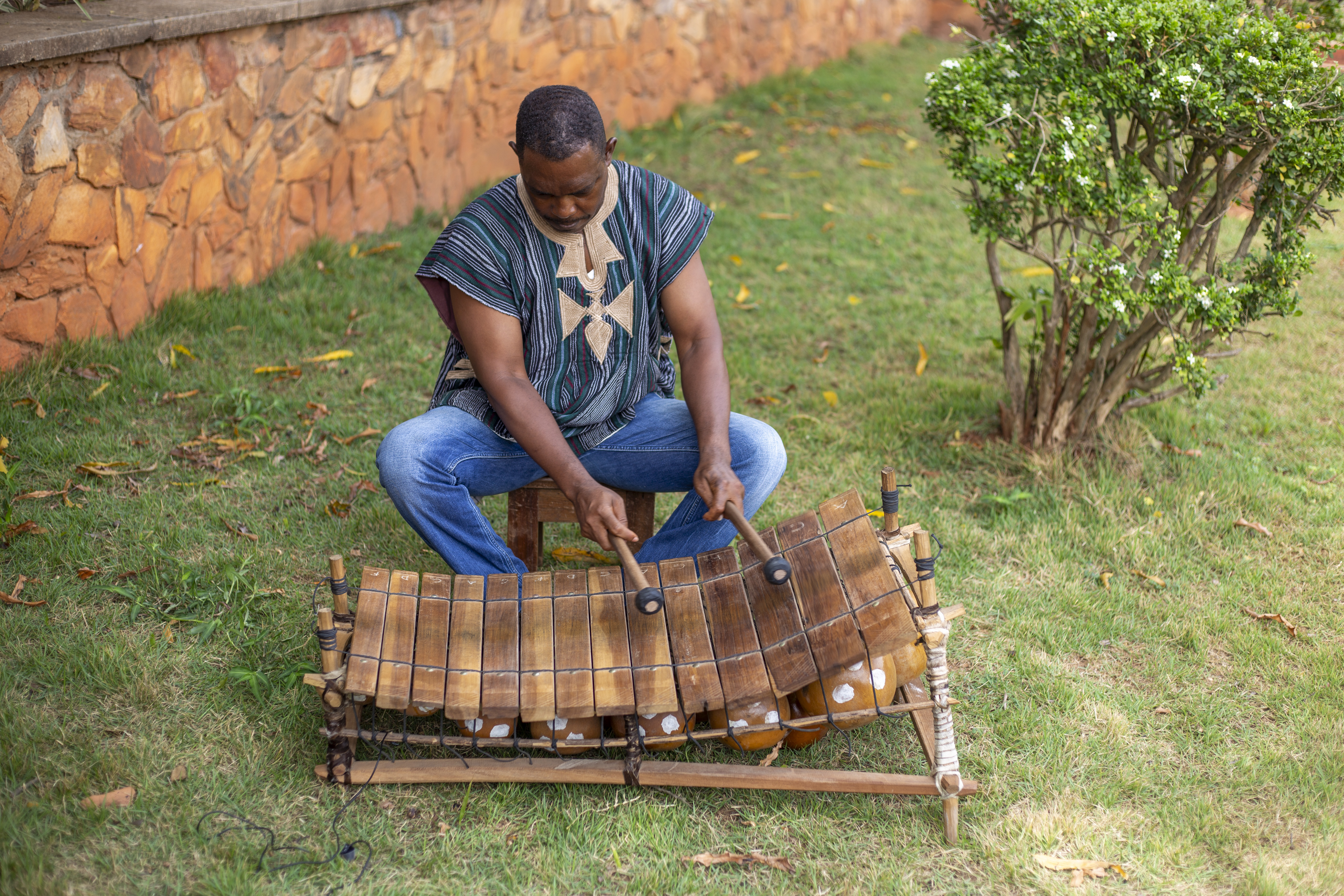
Gyile player

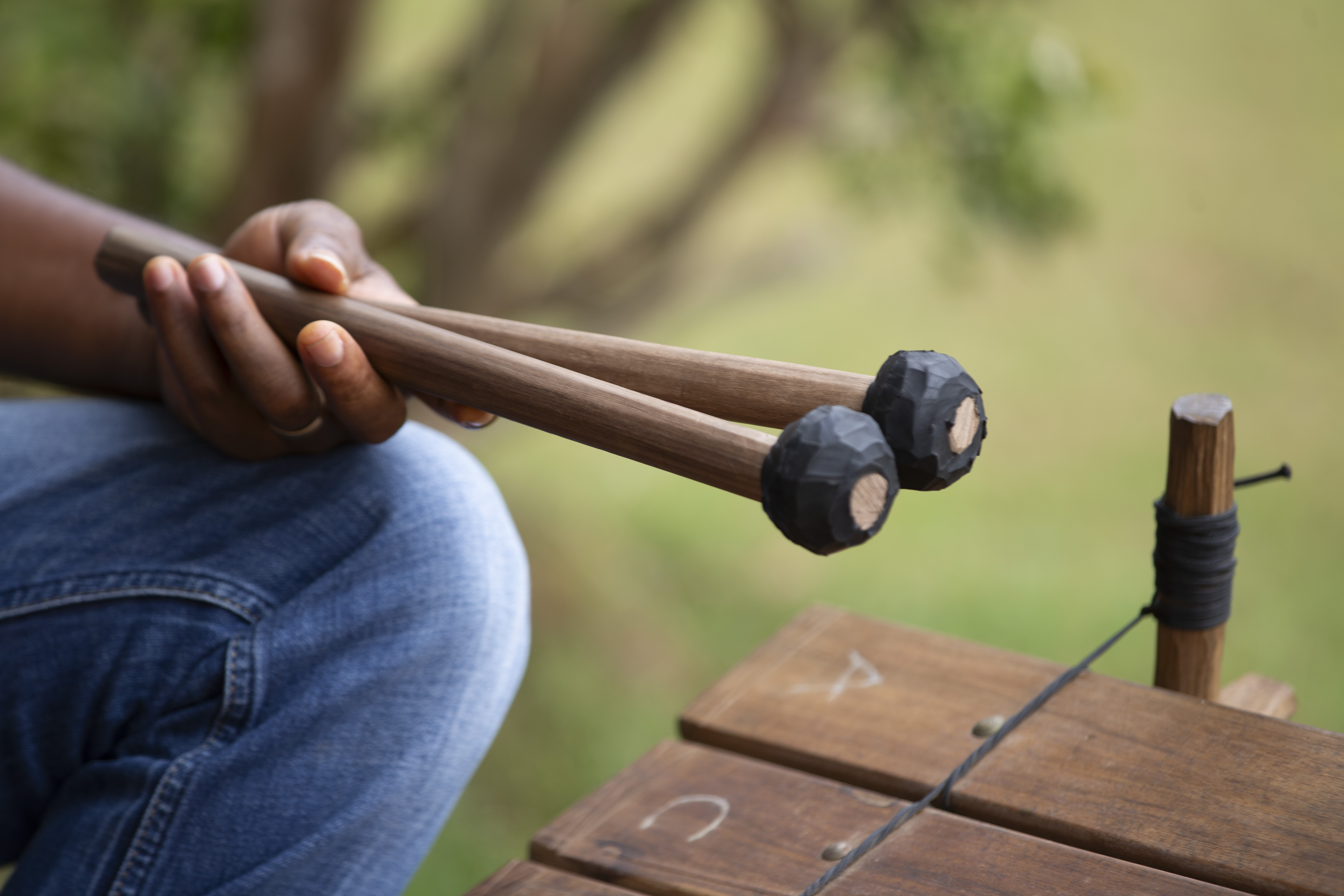
Wooden mallet with rubber heads

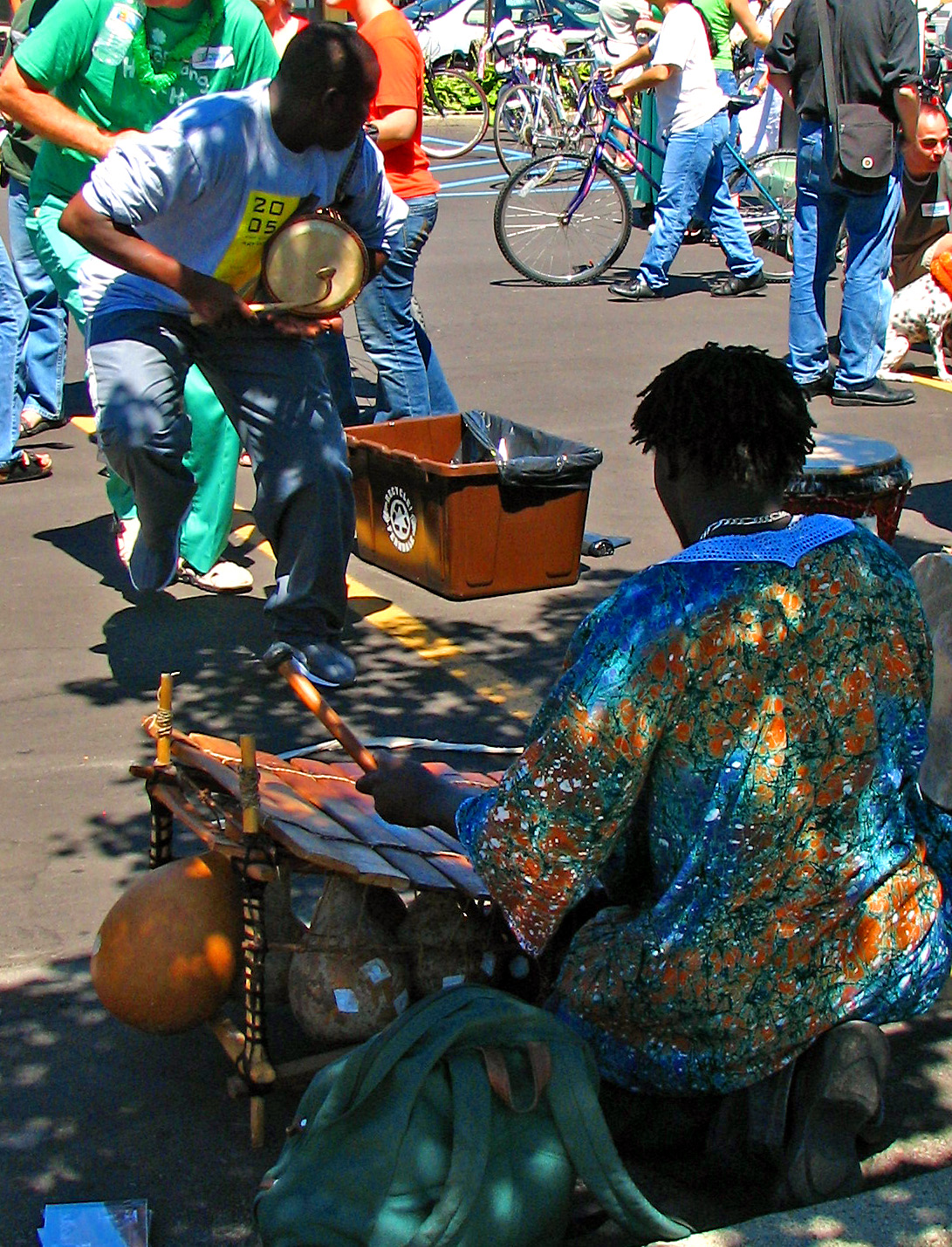
Musical instruments

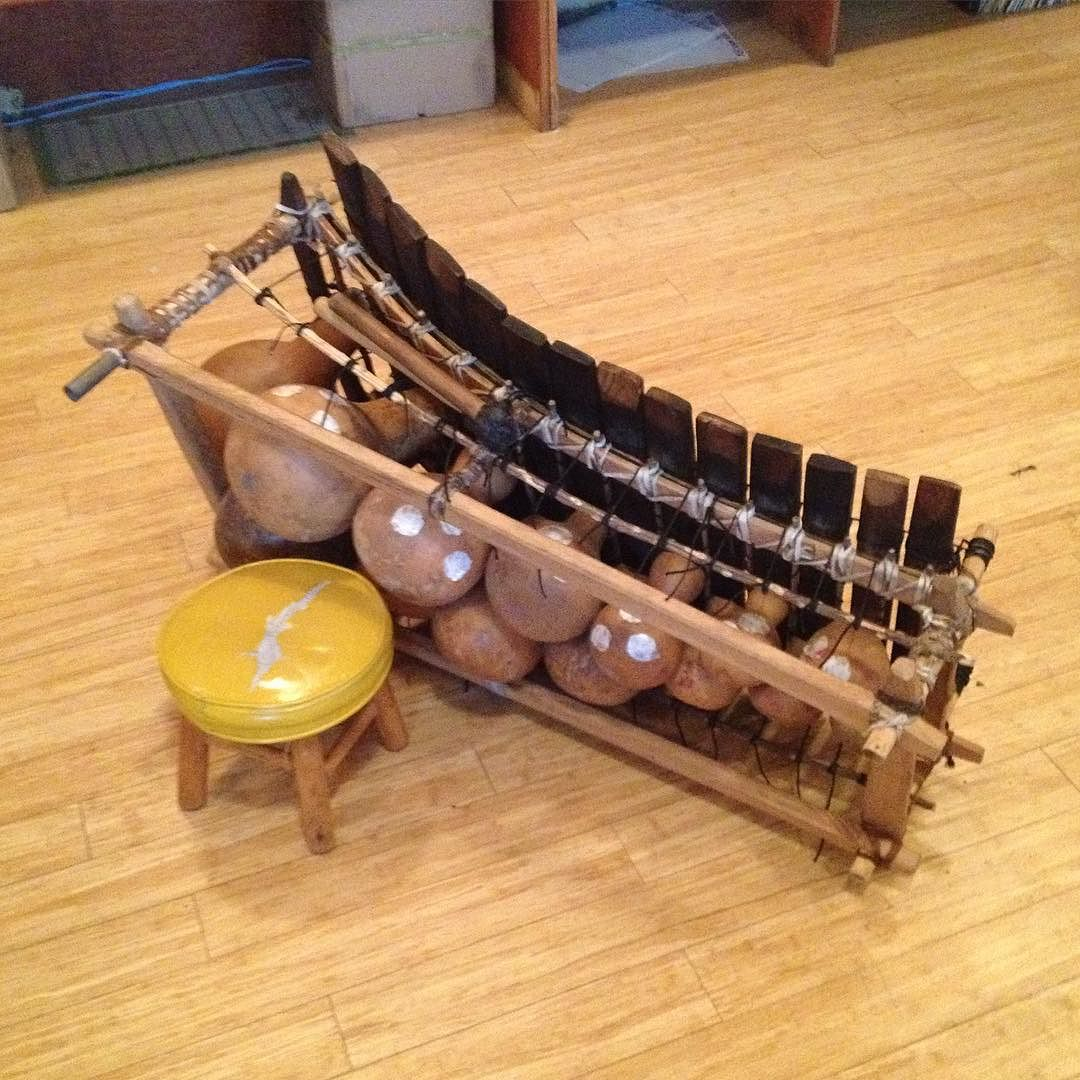
The underside of SK Kakraba

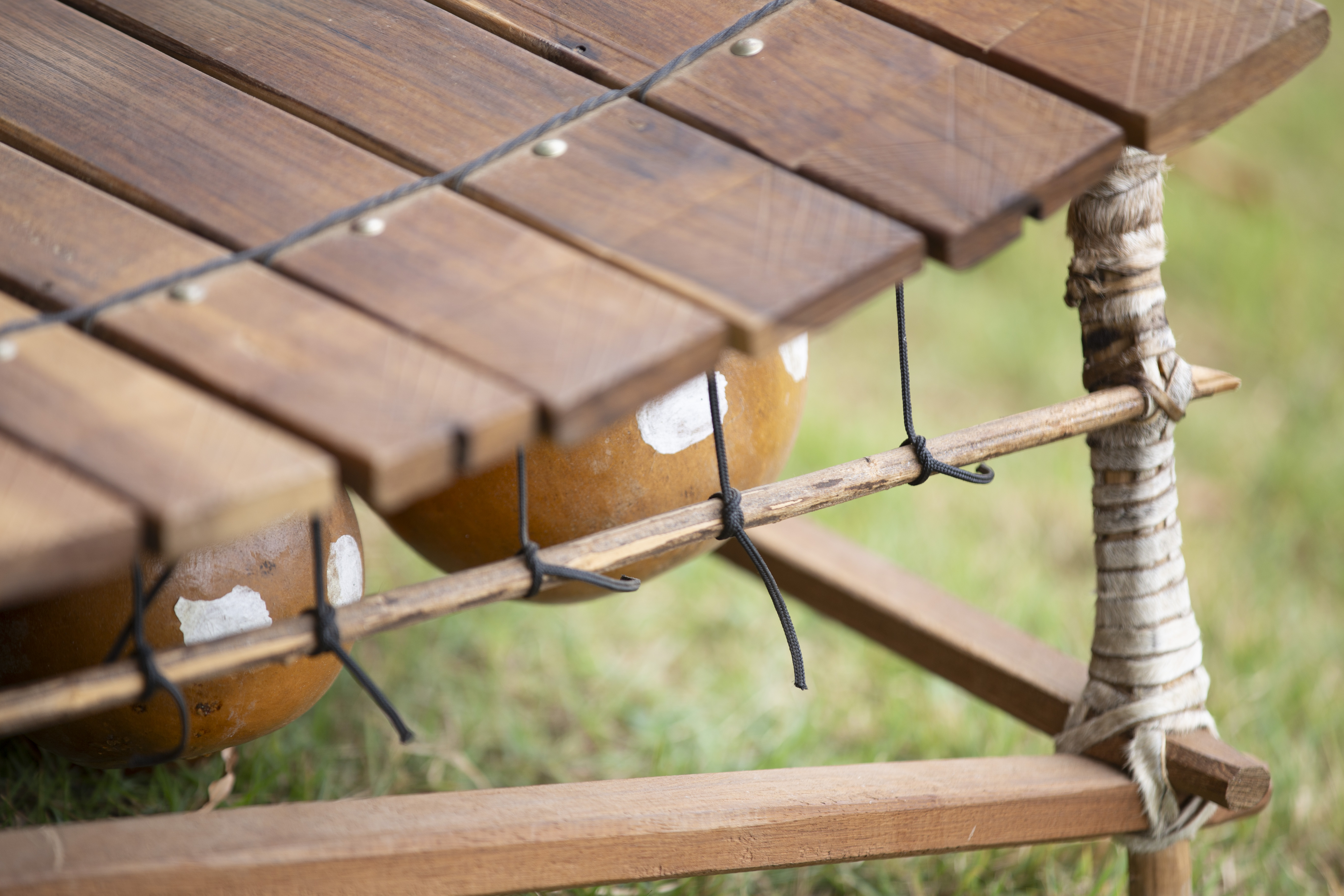
the Gyile Instrument

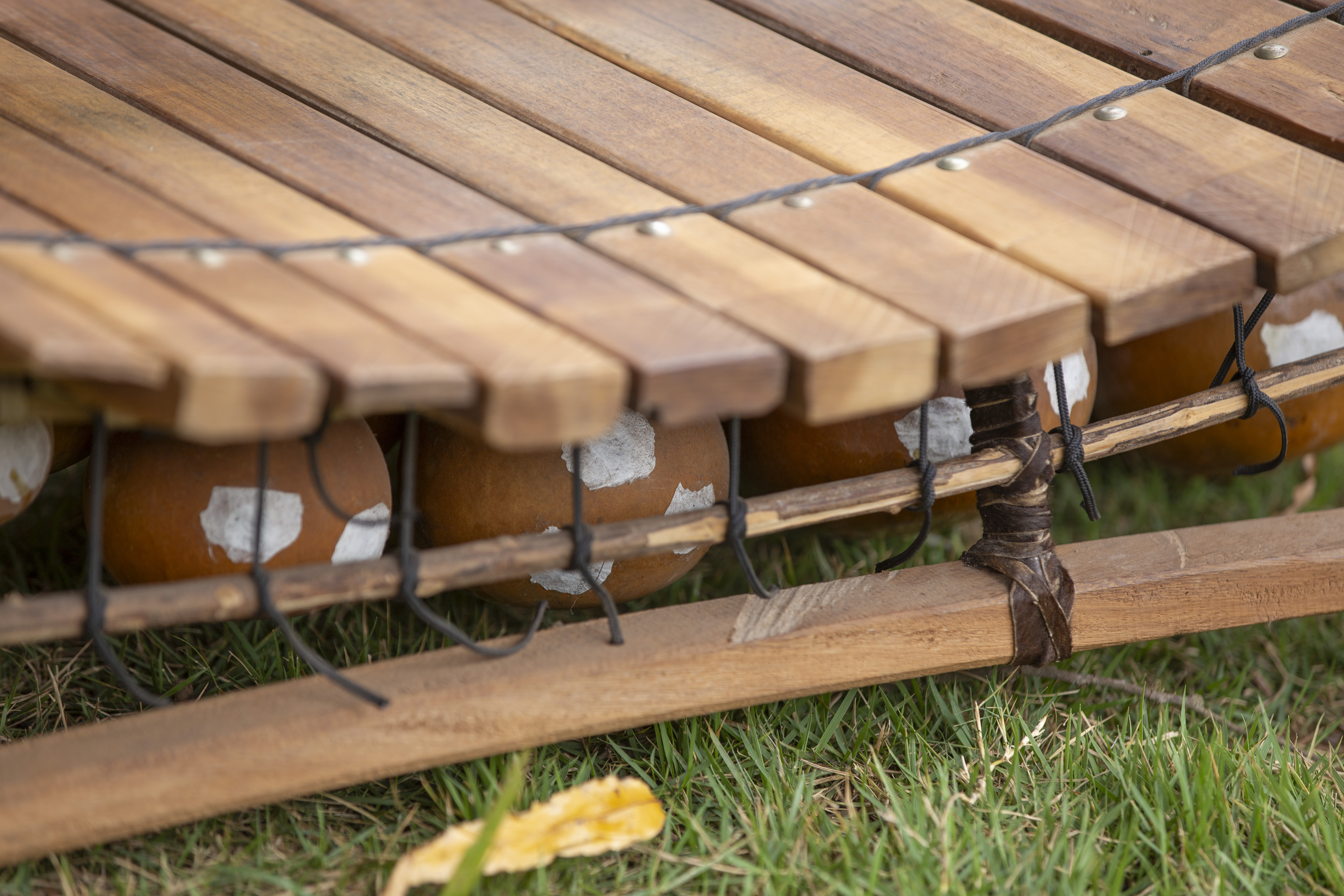
The gyile keys

== See also ==
- Balafon
