= Green is Popular =

Green is Popular Verde è Popolare
- President: Gianfranco Rotondi
- Founded: 2021
- Dissolved: 2023
- Preceded by: Christian Revolution
- Succeeded by: Christian Democracy with Rotondi
- Headquarters: Via di Santa Chiara, 61 – Rome
- Ideology: Christian democracy Green conservatism
- Political position: Centre
- National affiliation: Centre-right coalition

Website
- www.verdeepopolare.it

Green is Popular (Italian: Verde è Popolare, VèP) was a Christian-democratic and green-conservative political party in Italy, led by Gianfranco Rotondi.

== History ==
A veteran of Christian-democratic politics and parties, Rotondi has been associated with the centre-right coalition in different capacities. A former member of Christian Democracy, the Italian People's Party, the United Christian Democrats and the Union of Christian and Centre Democrats, in 2005 he left the latter in order to form Christian Democracy for Autonomies. Rotondi would later align with larger parties, The People of Freedom, Forza Italia and Brothers of Italy, while continuing to launch minor outfits, notably including Christian Revolution.

In July 2021, after the formation of Green Europe, Rotondi launched VèP, along with Paola Balducci, a former member of the Chamber of Deputies for the Federation of the Greens, being president and spokesperson, respectively. In May 2022 Giampiero Catone, a veteran of Rotondi's parties, was elected president of the party's national council.

In the 2022 general election VèP supported Giorgia Meloni and was elected to the Chamber of Deputies for Meloni's Brothers of Italy party.

In the 2023 Lazio regional election VèP formed a joint list with the Union of the Centre (UdC) and obtained 1.6% of the vote and one seat for UdC's Nazzareno Neri, who later switched to Us Moderates. A similar list was rejected in the 2023 Lombard regional election, due to lack of signatures.

In October 2023, during a convention in Saint-Vincent, Aosta Valley, Rotondi officially launched a new party named Christian Democracy with Rotondi, without dissolving VèP. The new party formed a federative pact with the New Italian Socialist Party (NPSI), with which VèP was already allied in the Regional Council of Campania.

== Electoral results ==
=== Italian Parliament ===
Election	Leader	Chamber of Deputies			
Election	Leader	Votes	%	Seats	+/−
2022	Gianfranco Rotondi	Into FdI		1 / 400	New

== Leadership ==
- President: Gianfranco Rotondi (2021–2023)
- Spokersperson: Paola Balducci (2021–2023)
- President of the national council: Giampiero Catone (2022–2023)
