= Italian Poker Tour season 6 results =

Season 6 of Italian Series of poker tournaments sponsored by PokerStars

== Season 6 ==
Below are the results of the sixth season of the Italian Poker Tour (IPT) sponsored by PokerStars. For this season, there will be five stages between the cities of San Marino, Sanremo and Saint-Vincent in Italy and Nova Gorica in Slovenia.

=== (Slovenia) IPT Nova Gorica I ===
- Venue: Perla Casino & Hotel, Nova Gorica, Slovenia
- Buy-in: €700
- 6-Day Event: January 16–21, 2014
- Number of buy-ins: 710
- Total Prize Pool: €433,881
- Number of Payouts: 39
- Official Results:

Final table
Place	Name	Prize
1st	(Serbia) Marko Mikovic	€89,000
2nd	(Italy) Nicolo Ceccarelli	€69,500
3rd	(Italy) Gianfranco Mazzariello	€54,500
4th	(Italy) Gianluca Trebbi	€30,000
5th	(Italy) Salvatore Bonavena	€24,000
6th	(Italy) Eros Nastasi	€19,000
7th	(Italy) Andrea Monteforte	€14,000
8th	(Germany) Marc Tschirch	€10,500

=== (Italy) IPT Saint-Vincent I ===
- Venue: Saint-Vincent Resort & Casino, Saint-Vincent, Italy
- Buy-in: €700
- 6-Day Event: February 27-March 4, 2014
- Number of buy-ins: 635
- Total Prize Pool: €388,049
- Number of Payouts: 47
- Official Results:

Final table
Place	Name	Prize
1st	(Italy) Walter Treccarichi	€87,500
2nd	(Italy) Marcello Miniucchi	€72,500
3rd	(Italy) Dario Sammartino	€35,000
4th	(Italy) Gianluca Speranza	€25,000
5th	(Italy) Andrea Dato	€20,000
6th	(Italy) Leonardo Parmiggiani	€15,000
7th	(Italy) Claudio Daffina	€11,000
8th	(Italy) Federico Piroddi	€8,000

=== (Italy) IPT Sanremo at EPT Sanremo ===
- Venue: Casino Sanremo, Sanremo, Italy
- Buy-in: €770
- 6-Day Event: April 9–14, 2014
- Number of buy-ins: 1,124
- Total Prize Pool: €763,196
- Number of Payouts: 167
- Official Results:

Final table
Place	Name	Prize
1st	(Italy) Alessandro De Fenza	€105,600
2nd	(Italy) Marcello Miniucchi	€95,600
3rd	(South Korea) Jae Kyung Sim	€75,000
4th	(Italy) Alessandro Longobardi	€43,200
5th	(Sweden) Alexander Norden	€32,900
6th	(France) Adel Kabbani	€24,200
7th	(Italy) Alessandro Borsa	€18,300
8th	(Italy) Fabio Scepi	€13,000

=== (Italy) IPT Saint-Vincent II ===
- Venue: Saint-Vincent Resort & Casino, Saint-Vincent, Italy
- Buy-in: €1,100
- 5-Day Event: July 24–28, 2014
- Number of buy-ins: 363
- Total Prize Pool: €352,110
- Number of Payouts: 47
- Official Results:

Final table
Place	Name	Prize
1st	(Italy) Massimo Pellegrino	€65,000
2nd	(Italy) Gianni Bussolino	€48,000
3rd	(Italy) Dario Nittolo	€48,000
4th	(Italy) Federico Piroddi	€24,000
5th	(Italy) Francesco Cordua	€19,000
6th	(Italy) Massimiliano Forti	€15,000
7th	(Italy) Marcello Re	€10,660
8th	(Norway) Thomas Valard	€8,300

=== (Italy) IPT Sanremo II ===
- Venue: Casino Sanremo, Sanremo, Italy
- Buy-in: €1,100
- 5-Day Event: September 4–8, 2014
- Number of buy-ins: 392
- Total Prize Pool: €380,240
- Number of Payouts: 55
- Official Results:

Final table
Place	Name	Prize
1st	(Italy) Riccardo Lacchinelli	€70,500
2nd	(France) Michel Segui	€59,500
3rd	(Italy) Roberto Masullo	€32,000
4th	(Italy) Giuseppe Di Stasio	€25,000
5th	(Italy) Antonio Illiano	€20,000
6th	(Italy) Muhamet Perati	€15,000
7th	(Italy) Carlo Savinelli	€11,000
8th	(Italy) Alessandro Peppino	€8,770

=== (Slovenia) IPT Nova Gorica II ===
- Venue: Perla Casino & Hotel, Nova Gorica, Slovenia
- Buy-in: €1,100
- 5-Day Event: October 23–27, 2014
- Number of buy-ins: 333
- Total Prize Pool: €333,000
- Number of Payouts: 47
- Official Results:

Final table
Place	Name	Prize
1st	(Italy) Igor Saia	€70,000
2nd	(Italy) Davide Suriano	€40,000
3rd	(Italy) Emanuele Buracchi	€30,000
4th	(Italy) Luca Pazzaglini	€23,000
5th	(Italy) Andrea Cortellazzi	€17,500
6th	(Moldova) Constantin Erhan	€13,000
7th	(Italy) Nicola Loperfido	€10,000
8th	(Italy) Roberto Zanellato	€7,800

=== (Italy) IPT Sanremo GRAND FINAL ===
- Venue: Casino Sanremo, Sanremo, Italy
- Buy-in: €990
- 5-Day Event: November 27-December 1, 2014
- Number of buy-ins: 234
- Total Prize Pool: €204,282
- Number of Payouts: 31
- Official Results:

Final table
Place	Name	Prize
1st	(Italy) Alessio Isaia	€43,000
2nd	(Romania) Dan Murariu	€35,000
3rd	(France) Sylvain Mazza	€20,000
4th	(Tunisia) Saied Lege	€15,500
5th	(Italy) Tommaso Pasquini	€12,000
6th	(France) Roland Azzopardi	€9,000
7th	(Italy) Alessio Traverso	€6,000
8th	(Italy) Francesco Berte	€5,000

- Italian Poker Tour - Season 6 Champion: (Italy) Niccolò Ceccarelli
