= Italian Poker Tour season 7 results =

Season 7 of Italian Series of poker tournaments sponsored by PokerStars

== Season 7 ==
Below are the results of the seventh season of the Italian Poker Tour (IPT) sponsored by PokerStars. For this season, there will be four stops in the new PokerStars Live Room at Saint-Vincent Resort & Casino, Saint-Vincent and other two steps inside EPT Malta season 11 and EPT Malta season 12

=== IPT Malta at EPT Malta I ===
- Venue: Portomaso Casino, St. Julian's, Malta
- Buy-in: €1,100
- 6-Day Event: March 18–23, 2015
- Number of buy-ins: 1,285
- Total Prize Pool: €1,246,450
- Number of Payouts: 191
- Official Results:

Final table
Place	Name	Prize
1st	(Greece) Georgios Zisimopoulos	€142,205*
2nd	(Poland) Jaroslaw Sikora	€97,975*
3rd	(Italy) Nicolino Di Carlo	€119,585*
4th	(Germany) Michael Feil	€101,260*
5th	(Germany) Fred Reusch	€97,675*
6th	(Estonia) Georgi Abuladze	€39,000
7th	(Italy) Ezio Nisoli	€29,800
8th	(Germany) Julian Track	€21,000

* Deal at final table

=== (Italy) MINI IPT Saint-Vincent I ===
- Venue: PokerStars LIVE ROOM at Saint-Vincent Resort & Casino, Saint-Vincent, Italy
- Buy-in: €330
- 6-day event: April 23-28, 2015
- Number of buy-ins: 775
- Guaranteed prize pool: €100,000
- Total prize pool: €225,525
- Number of payouts: 72
- Official results:

Final table
Place	Name	Prize
1st	(Switzerland) Jean-Marc Bellini	€42,000*
2nd	(Italy) Ervin Gjini	€40,000*
3rd	(Italy) Francesco Lizzari	€17,500
4th	(Italy) Alessio Gobbin	€13,000
5th	(Italy) Federico Piroddi	€10,500
6th	(Italy) Salvatore Augeri	€8,500
7th	(Italy) Alexander Novitskiy	€6,500
8th	(Italy) Francesco Castrovilli	€5,000

* Deal at final table

=== (Italy) MINI IPT Saint-Vincent II ===
- Venue: PokerStars LIVE ROOM at Saint-Vincent Resort & Casino, Saint-Vincent, Italy
- Buy-in: €330
- 6-Day Event: July 23-28, 2015
- Number of buy-ins: 829
- Total Prize Pool: €248,700
- Number of Payouts: 71
- Official Results:

Final table
Place	Name	Prize
1st	(Italy) Alessandro Spadaccini	€33,739
2nd	(Italy) Umberto Ferrauto	€33,000
3rd	(Italy) Fabrizio Strano	€20,600
4th	(Italy) Dama Bruno	€23,800
5th	(Italy) Alessandro Minasi	€21,200
6th	(Switzerland) Fuzesi Ferenc	€11,000
7th	(Italy) Elia Salerno	€9,000
8th	(Italy) Paolo Basso	€7,000

=== (Italy) IPT Saint-Vincent III ===
- Venue: PokerStars LIVE ROOM at Saint-Vincent Resort & Casino, Saint-Vincent, Italy
- Buy-in: €1,100
- 6-Day Event: July 30 - August 3, 2015
- Number of buy-ins: 390
- Total Prize Pool: €378,300
- Number of Payouts: 55
- Official Results:

Final table
Place	Name	Prize
1st	(Italy) Alessandro Adinolfo	€80,000
2nd	(Italy) Giuseppe Caridi	€45,000
3rd	Italy Enrico Consales	€32,000
4th	(Italy) Giorgio Soceanu	€26,000
5th	(Italy) Christian Cipriano	€21,000
6th	(Italy) Giuseppe Mancini	€16,000
7th	(Italy) Paolo Pellegrini	€12,000
8th	(Netherlands) Micha Hoedemaker	€8,500

=== (Slovenia) IPT Nova Gorica ===
- Venue: Perla Casino & Hotel, Nova Gorica, Slovenia
- Buy-in: €1,100
- 6-Day Event: September 10-14, 2015
- Number of buy-ins: 265
- Total Prize Pool: €257,050
- Number of Payouts: 31
- Official Results:

Final table
Place	Name	Prize
1st	(Italy) Matteo Mutti	€80,000
2nd	(Italy) Christian Favale	€45,000
3rd	(Italy) Fabio Scepi	€32,000
4th	(Estonia) Mark Metsla	€26,000
5th	(Italy) Giulio Saia	€21,000
6th	(Italy) Gennaro Avvisato	€16,000
7th	(Italy) Roberto Mazzaferro	€12,000
8th	(Italy) Riccardo Suriano	€8,500

=== IPT Malta at EPT Malta II ===
- Venue: Portomaso Casino, St. Julian's, Malta
- Buy-in: €1,100
- 6-Day Event: October 21-25, 2015
- Number of buy-ins: 947
- Total Prize Pool: €918,590
- Number of Payouts: 135
- Official Results:

Final table
Place	Name	Prize
1st	(Belgium) Natan Chauskin	€149,560
2nd	(Netherlands) Govert Metaal	€124,000
3rd	(England) Christopher Brammer	€72,660
4th	(Spain) David Gomez Morante	€54,570
5th	(Netherlands) Joep Raemaekers	€42,440
6th	(Sweden) Tobias Garp	€31,420
7th	(Republic of Ireland) James Grogan	€22,500
8th	(Russia) Denis Timofeev	€16,030

=== (Italy) MINI IPT Saint-Vincent GRAND FINAL ===
- Venue: PokerStars LIVE ROOM at Saint-Vincent Resort & Casino, Saint-Vincent, Italy
- Buy-in: €330
- 6-Day Event: November 20-24, 2015
- Number of buy-ins: 640
- Total Prize Pool: €186,240
- Number of Payouts: 63
- Official Results:

Final table
Place	Name	Prize
1st	(Italy) Alessandro Minasi	€30,000*
2nd	(France) Benjamin Sibuet	€22,500*
3rd	(Italy) Gianandrea Bandiera	€22,000*
4th	(Italy) Guido Presti	€13,000
5th	(Italy) Fabrizio Pellerino	€10,480
6th	Italy Filippo Salvetti	€8,000
7th	(Italy) Costantin Denisov	€6,000
8th	(Italy) Dario Quattrucci	€4,300

* Deal at final table

=== (Italy) IPT Saint-Vincent GRAND FINAL ===
- Venue: PokerStars LIVE ROOM at Saint-Vincent Resort & Casino, Saint-Vincent, Italy
- Buy-in: €1,100
- 6-Day Event: January 21-25, 2016
- Number of buy-ins: 308
- Total Prize Pool: €298,760
- Number of Payouts: 39
- Official Results:

Final table
Place	Name	Prize
1st	(Hungary) Balazs Somodi	€70,000
2nd	(Romania) Tudor Purice	€40,000
3rd	(Italy) Fabio Mangano	€29,000
4th	(Italy) Lorenzo Pio	€21,000
5th	(Lithuania) Liutauras Armanavicius	€16,500
6th	(Russia) Vladimir Shabalin	€13,000
7th	(Romania) Stefan Lache Vlad	€9,860
8th	(Italy) Massimo Casabona	€7,000

- Italian Poker Tour - Season 7 Champion: (Italy)
