= Christian Democracy (Italy, 2012) =

Italian political party

Christian Democracy Democrazia Cristiana
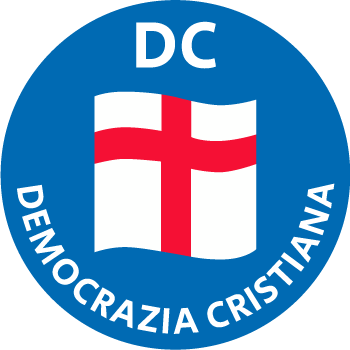
- Secretary: Gianpiero Samorì (acting)
- President: Renato Grassi
- Founded: 30 March 2012
- Ideology: Christian democracy
- Political position: Centre to centre-right
- Chamber of Deputies: 0 / 400
- Senate: 0 / 200
- European Parliament: 0 / 76

Website
- https://dcitalia.it

Christian Democracy (Democrazia Cristiana, DC) is a minor Christian democratic political party in Italy.

== History ==
The ruling of the United Sections of the Court of Cassation n. 25999/2010 definitively sanctioned that the historical Christian Democracy did not have a juridical continuity with the various formations that had claimed the succession of that party. The ruling also made it clear that Christian Democracy was never dissolved by Congress, the only statutory body entitled to take such a decision. Therefore, on the initiative of Clelio Darida, with a notice in the Official Gazette of 12 March 2012, the National Council in charge in 1993 was reconvened to deliberate the election of the Political Secretary and the President. The council, meeting in Rome on 30 March 2012, elected Gianni Fontana as Political Secretary, Silvio Lega as President of the National Council and Clelio Darida as Honorary President. Therefore, the political subjects who claimed the name "Christian Democracy" became three, led respectively by Giuseppe Pizza, Angelo Sandri and Gianni Fontana. Even the party led by Fontana resumed the celebration of the congresses continuing the numbering from the last of those celebrated by the historical DC, the XVIII held in 1989. In May 2012 Giampiero Catone, a deputy elected with The People of Freedom and formerly a leading member of the Christian Democratic Centre, the Union of Christian and Centre Democrats and Christian Democracy for Autonomies, joined the party, which was thus given parliamentary representation. Finally, in November 2012 the XIX congress was celebrated, which ratified the election of Fontana as Secretary.

In December 2018 Gianfranco Rotondi, president of the Federation of Christian Democracy and former leader of Christian Democracy for Autonomies, Mario Tassone, secretary of the New CDU, Giorgio Merlo, leader of "White Network" and Renato Grassi, secretary of the DC, signed a federative pact for the reconstitution of the Christian Democracy, that, in June 2019, became a foundation.

In the 2022 general election the DC joined the joint list of Action and Italia Viva. Contextually, Christian Democracy Sicily, that is the Sicilian branch of the party, obtained 6.5% of the vote in the 2022 Sicilian regional election. In May 2023, during a congress, Salvatore Cuffaro was elected secretary, while Grassi became president.

In November 2025 Cuffaro resigned and was replaced by acting secretary Gianpiero Samorì.

== Leadership ==
- Secretary: Gianni Fontana (2012–2018), Renato Grassi (2018–2023), Salvatore Cuffaro (2023–2025), Gianpiero Samorì (acting, 2025–present)
- President: Silvio Lega (2012–2018), Gianni Fontana (2018–2019), Renzo Gubert (2019–2023), Renato Grassi (2023–present)
- Honorary President: Clelio Darida (2012–2017)

== Election results ==
=== European Parliament ===
Election	Leader	Votes	%	Seats	+/–	EP Group
2024	Salvatore Cuffaro	Into FI–NM		0 / 76	New	–
