= Christian Democracy with Rotondi =

Political party in Italy

Christian Democracy with Rotondi Democrazia Cristiana con Rotondi
- Secretary: Gianfranco Rotondi
- President: Giampiero Catone
- Founded: 2023
- Preceded by: Green is Popular
- Headquarters: Via San Alberico Crescitelli, 15, Avellino
- Ideology: Christian democracy
- Political position: Centre-right
- National affiliation: Coalition: Centre-right coalition Political party: Brothers of Italy (since 2022)
- Chamber of Deputies: 1 / 400 (Within Brothers of Italy)
- Senate: 0 / 200
- European Parliament: 0 / 76
- Regional Councils: 0 / 896

Website
- dcconrotondi.it

Christian Democracy with Rotondi (Italian: Democrazia Cristiana con Rotondi, DCR) is a Christian-democratic political party in Italy, led by Gianfranco Rotondi.

== History ==
A veteran of Christian-democratic politics and parties, Rotondi has been associated with the centre-right coalition in different capacities. A former member of Christian Democracy, the Italian People's Party, the United Christian Democrats and the Union of Christian and Centre Democrats, in 2005 he left the latter in order to form Christian Democracy for Autonomies, which can be considered the precursor of the DCR. Rotondi would later align with larger parties, The People of Freedom, Forza Italia and Brothers of Italy, while continuing to launch minor outfits, notably including Christian Revolution and Green is Popular, which acted as associate parties or factions within the larger parties to which they were affiliated.

In the 2023 Molise regional election, held in June, Rotondi's followers formed a joint list with the Union of the Centre (UdC) and Us of the Centre, obtaining 3.5% of the vote and no seats. The list was named "Union of the Centre – Christian Democracy – Us of the Centre", marking the first time that Rotondi resumed "Christian Democracy" after DCA's dissolution.

In October 2023, during a convention in Saint-Vincent, Aosta Valley, Rotondi officially launched the DCR. The party, whose leader was a member of the Chamber of Deputies for Brothers of Italy, also formed a federative pact with the New Italian Socialist Party (NPSI), with which Green is Popular was already allied in the Regional Council of Campania.

The party ran for the first time in the 2024 Sardinian regional election and obtained 0.3% of the vote, while in the 2024 Abruzzo regional election it formed a joint list with the UdC, obtaining 1.2% of the vote and no elects. The DCR ran in a joint list with the UdC (and United Populars) also in the 2024 Basilicata regional election, obtaining 2.5% of the vote and no seats.

== Symbols ==
Up to 2026

2026–

== Leadership ==
- Secretary: Gianfranco Rotondi (2023–present)
