= Italian Poker Tour season 5 results =

Season 5 of Italian Series of poker tournaments sponsored by PokerStars

== Season 5 ==
Below are the results of the fifth season of the Italian Poker Tour (IPT) sponsored by PokerStars. For this season, there will be five stages between the cities of San Marino, Sanremo and Saint-Vincent in Italy and Nova Gorica in Slovenia.

=== IPT San Marino ===
- Venue: Centro Congressi San Marino, San Marino, Italy
- Buy-in: €2,200
- 5-Day Event: June 13–17, 2013
- Number of buy-ins: 154
- Total Prize Pool: €298,760
- Number of Payouts: 24
- Official Results:

Final table
Place	Name	Prize
1st	(Italy) Antonio Bernaudo	€65,580
2nd	(Italy) Gianluca Trebbi	€57,450
3rd	(Italy) Domenico Drammis	€42,770
4th	(Italy) Valerio Alzani	€23,900
5th	(Italy) Alessandro Giordano	€16,400
6th	(Netherlands) Steven Vollers	€12,000
7th	(Italy) Giovanni Rizzo	€8,900
8th	(Italy) Giorgio Di Cunzolo	€7,400

=== (Italy) IPT Sanremo I ===
- Venue: Casino Sanremo, Sanremo, Italy
- Buy-in: €2,200
- 5-Day Event: July 25–29, 2013
- Number of buy-ins: 246
- Total Prize Pool: €492,000
- Number of Payouts: 24
- Official Results:

Final table
Place	Name	Prize
1st	(Italy) Fabrizio Piva	€121,000
2nd	(France) Ryad Belabdelouahab	€89,600
3rd	(Italy) Alessandro Ferrari	€44,200
4th	(Poland) Marcin Wydrowski	€34,000
5th	(Italy) Luigi Pignataro	€27,700
6th	(Italy) Alessandro Longobardi	€22,000
7th	(Italy) Gianluca Speranza	€16,700
8th	(Poland) Pawel Brzeski	€12,440

=== (Slovenia) IPT Nova Gorica ===
- Venue: Perla Casino & Hotel, Nova Gorica, Slovenia
- Buy-in: €700
- 6-Day Event: August 22–27, 2013
- Number of buy-ins: 715
- Total Prize Pool: €450,450
- Number of Payouts: 39
- Official Results:

Final table
Place	Name	Prize
1st	(Italy) Claudio Di Giacomo	€90,000
2nd	(Italy) Pier Paolo Fabretti	€70,000
3rd	(Italy) Fabrizio D'Agostino	€55,000
4th	(Slovenia) Andrei Lazar	€30,000
5th	(Italy) Dario Sammartino	€24,000
6th	(Italy) Andrea Benelli	€19,000
7th	(Italy) Walter Coan	€14,000
8th	(Italy) Marco Venturi	€10,837

=== (Italy) IPT Sanremo II ===
- Venue: Casino Sanremo, Sanremo, Italy
- Buy-in: €700
- 6-Day Event: October 24–29, 2013
- Number of buy-ins: 1,010
- Total Prize Pool: €617,211
- Number of Payouts: 56
- Official Results:

Final table
Place	Name	Prize
1st	(Italy) Federico Piroddi	€125,000
2nd	(Italy) Dario Sammartino	€95,000
3rd	(Italy) Alfonso Amendola	€70,000
4th	(Italy) Vincenzo Ruggiero	€43,000
5th	(Italy) Andrea Benelli	€32,000
6th	(Italy) Ivan Gabrieli	€22,500
7th	(Italy) Guido Presti	€16,000
8th	(Italy) Michele Di Lauro	€12,000

=== (Italy) IPT Saint-Vincent GRAND FINAL ===
- Venue: Saint-Vincent Resort & Casino, Saint-Vincent, Italy
- Buy-in: €700
- 6-Day Event: November 28-December 3, 2013
- Number of buy-ins: 914
- Total Prize Pool: €575,820
- Number of Payouts: 55
- Official Results:

Final table
Place	Name	Prize
1st	(Italy) Domenico Drammis	€130,000
2nd	(Italy) Gianpaolo Eramo	€75,000
3rd	(Italy) Domenico Rao	€50,000
4th	(Italy) Eros Nastasi	€40,000
5th	(Italy) Davide Costa	€30,000
6th	(France) Sebastian Didelot	€20,000
7th	(Italy) Antonino Leotta	€14,000
8th	(Italy) Ivan Gabrieli	€11,245

- Italian Poker Tour - Season 5 Champion: (Italy) Domenico Drammis
