= Italian Poker Tour season 4 results =

Season 4 of Italian Series of poker tournaments sponsored by PokerStars

== Season 4 ==
Below are the results of the fourth season of the Italian Poker Tour (IPT) sponsored by PokerStars. For this season, there will be seven stages between the cities of Campione d'Italia, Sanremo in Italy and Nova Gorica in Slovenia and the new destination of Saint-Vincent.

=== (Italy) IPT Campione I ===
- Venue: Casino Campione d'Italia, Campione d'Italia, Italy
- Buy-in: CHF 2,618 (~€2,180)
- 5-Day Event: May 24–28, 2012
- Number of buy-ins: 224
- Total Prize Pool: CHF 517,126 (~€430,333)
- Number of Payouts: 32
- Official Results:

Final table
Place	Name	Prize (CHF)
1st	(Italy) Antonino Venneri	130,000 (~€108,181)
2nd	(Italy) Ivan Losi	100,000 (~€83,216)
3rd	(Italy) Silvano Peracchi	57,000 (~€47,433)
4th	(Italy) Rocco Palumbo	41,000 (~€34,119)
5th	(Italy) Massimiliano Bellucci	25,486 (~€21,209)
6th	(Italy) Michele Bianchi	20,000 (~€16,643)
7th	(Italy) Massimiliano Patroncini	15,500 (~€12,899)
8th	(Italy) Marco Pistilli	12,900 (~€10,735)

=== (Italy) IPT Sanremo I ===
- Venue: Casino Sanremo, Sanremo, Italy
- Buy-in: €2,200
- 5-Day Event: July 26–30, 2012
- Number of buy-ins: 375
- Total Prize Pool: €727,500
- Number of Payouts: 56
- Official Results:

Final table
Place	Name	Prize
1st	(Italy) Alessandro Meoni	€166,000
2nd	(Italy) Raffaele Bertolucci	€129,000
3rd	(France) Julien Norbert	€71,500
4th	(Italy) Nicolo Allisiardi	€53,500
5th	(Italy) Andrea Dato	€36,000
6th	(Spain) Omar Rodriguez	€29,000
7th	(France) Johnatan Maisonneuve	€21,000
8th	(Italy) Giuseppe Zarbo	€14,000

=== (Italy) IPT Campione II ===
- Venue: Casino Campione d'Italia, Campione d'Italia, Italy
- Buy-in: CHF 2,618 (~€2,180)
- 5-Day Event: August 30-September 3, 2012
- Number of buy-ins: 282
- Total Prize Pool: CHF 671,160 (~€558,870)
- Number of Payouts: 40
- Official Results:

Final table
Place	Name	Prize (CHF)
1st	(Italy) Manlio Iemina	154,000 (~€128,235)
2nd	(Italy) Stefano Terziani	126,000 (~€104,919)
3rd	(Italy) Fabrizio Ortolomo	65,000 (~€54,125)
4th	(Romania) Alain Medesan	50,000 (~€42,635)
5th	(Italy) Jacopo Brandi	€32,500 (~€27,063)
6th	(Austria) Ivo Donev	25,500 (~€21,234)
7th	(Italy) Paolo Compagno	19,000 (~€15,821)
8th	(China) Zhiping Zeng	14,625 (~€12,178)

=== (Slovenia) IPT Nova Gorica ===
- Venue: Perla Casino & Hotel, Nova Gorica, Slovenia
- Buy-in: €2,200
- 5-Day Event: November 15–19, 2012
- Number of buy-ins: 298
- Total Prize Pool: €578,120
- Number of Payouts: 40
- Official Results:

Final table
Place	Name	Prize
1st	(Italy) Riccardo D'Antoni	€155,000
2nd	(Italy) Salvatore Bonavena	€95,000
3rd	(Italy) Sebastiano Giudice	€55,000
4th	(Italy) Fausto Cheli	€42,000
5th	(Italy) Paolo Casaburi	€33,000
6th	(Italy) Massimilliano Bramati	€25,000
7th	(Italy) Michele Di Lauro	€18,000
8th	(Italy) Michele Limongi	€12,000

=== (Italy) IPT Campione III ===
- Venue: Casino Campione d'Italia, Campione d'Italia, Italy
- Buy-in: CHF 2,629 (~€2,171)
- 5-Day Event: January 10–14, 2013
- Number of buy-ins: 385
- Total Prize Pool: CHF 892,544 (~€736,884)
- Number of Payouts: 56
- Official Results:

Final table
Place	Name	Prize (CHF)
1st	(Italy) Andrea Montini	200,000 (~€165,120)
2nd	(Italy) Vito Planeta	163,000 (~€134,573)
3rd	(Italy) Giuseppe Esposito	90,000 (~€74,304)
4th	(Italy) Davide Slanzi	67,000 (~€55,315)
5th	(Italy) Roberto Finotti	44,700 (~€36,904)
6th	(Italy) Massimo Bulgari	35,500 (~€29,309)
7th	(Italy) Federico Granara	26,500 (~€21,878)
8th	(Italy) Ciro Petta	17,900 (~€14,778)

=== (Italy) IPT Saint-Vincent ===
- Venue: Saint-Vincent Resort & Casino, Saint-Vincent, Italy
- Buy-in: €2,200
- 5-Day Event: February 28-March 4, 2013
- Number of buy-ins: 358
- Total Prize Pool: €694,520
- Number of Payouts: 48
- Official Results:

Final table
Place	Name	Prize
1st	(Italy) Luca Moschitta	€180,000
2nd	(Italy) Gianbattista Sacchella	€115,000
3rd	(Italy) Marcello Baccaglini	€70,000
4th	(Italy) Claudio Daffina	€50,000
5th	(Italy) Lorenzo Sabato	€35,000
6th	(Italy) Massimiliano Martinez	€28,000
7th	(Italy) Marcello Miniucchi	€21,000
8th	(Italy) Marco Leonzio	€14,000

=== (Italy) IPT Sanremo GRAND FINAL ===
- Venue: Casino Sanremo, Sanremo, Italy
- Buy-in: €2,200
- 5-Day Event: May 2–6, 2013
- Number of buy-ins: 428
- Total Prize Pool: €830,320
- Number of Payouts: 56
- Official Results:

Final table
Place	Name	Prize
1st	(Italy) Nicola Sasso	€185,000
2nd	(United States) David Peters	€155,000
3rd	(Italy) Alessandro Monticciolo	€83,000
4th	(Bulgaria) Valeri Savov	€62,000
5th	(France) Jeremie Sarda	€41,500
6th	(Czech Republic) David Taborsky	€33,200
7th	(Italy) Domenico Benvenuto	€24,900
8th	(Italy) Daniele Scatragli	€16,600

- Italian Poker Tour - Season 4 Champion: (Italy) Ivan Losi
