= Italian Poker Tour season 8 results =

Season 8 of Italian Series of poker tournaments sponsored by PokerStars

Italian Poker Tour season 8 results lists the results of the eighth season of the Italian Poker Tour (IPT) sponsored by PokerStars. For this season, there were six stops in total, Saint-Vincent Resort & Casino, Saint-Vincent, one step inside EPT Malta season 13

== Season 8 ==
=== (Italy) IPT Saint-Vincent I ===
- Venue: PokerStars LIVE ROOM at Saint-Vincent Resort & Casino, Saint-Vincent, Italy
- Buy-in: €1,100
- 6-Day Event: May 11-16, 2016
- Number of buy-ins: 260
- Total Prize Pool: €252,200
- Number of Payouts: 31
- Official Results:

Final table
Place	Name	Prize
1st	(Switzerland) Eric Joss	€47,000*
2nd	(Latvia) Arturs Daugis	€47,000*
3rd	(United States) Aaron Gustavson	€24,000
4th	(Italy) Marco Monello	€19,500
5th	(France) Paul Testud	€15,000
6th	(Italy) Alessandro Minasi	€11,500
7th	(Italy) Delfino Novara	€9,000
8th	(Italy) Raffaele Castro	€6,500

* Deal at final table

=== (Italy) MINI IPT Saint-Vincent II ===
- Venue: PokerStars LIVE ROOM at Saint-Vincent Resort & Casino, Saint-Vincent, Italy
- Buy-in: €330
- 6-Day Event: July 14-19, 2016
- Number of buy-ins: 508
- Total Prize Pool: €150,000
- Number of Payouts: 31
- Official Results:

Final table
Place	Name	Prize
1st	(Italy) Diego Raimondi	€22,000*
2nd	(Italy) Stefano Mantovani	€21,000*
3rd	(Italy) Luca Sebastiani	€21,000*
4th	(Switzerland) Andreas Moser	€11,000
5th	(Italy) Lorenzo Pio	€8,450
6th	(France) Jamal Mamouni	€6,500
7th	(Italy) Gianvito Bitetti	€4,800
8th	(Italy) Alessandro Adinolfo	€3,500

* Deal at final table

=== (Italy) IPT Saint-Vincent III KO EDITION ===
- Venue: PokerStars LIVE ROOM at Saint-Vincent Resort & Casino, Saint-Vincent, Italy
- Buy-in: €1,100 Knock Out Edition
- 6-Day Event: August 3,8, 2016
- Number of buy-ins: 370
- Guaranteed Prize Pool: €300,000
- Total Prize Pool: €179,450 + €179,450(K.O.)
- Number of Payouts: 39
- Official Results:

Final table
Place	Name	Prize
1st	(Italy) Francesco Elefante	€28,500 + €11,500 KO
2nd	(Italy) Nicolaj D'Antonij	€22,000
3rd	(France) Jean Poingt	€16,500
4th	(Italy) Codrin Macovei	€13,900
5th	(Italy) Tommaso Assuntore	€11,000
6th	(Italy) Francesco Crisafulli	€8,200
7th	(Italy) Andrea Cortellazzi	€6,010
8th	(Italy) Mauro Cordisco	€4,400

* Deal at final table

=== IPT Malta at EPT Malta ===
- Venue: Portomaso Casino, St. Julian's, Malta
- Buy-in: €1,100
- 5-Day Event: October 19–23, 2016
- Number of buy-ins: 775
- Total Prize Pool: €751,750
- Number of Payouts: 152
- Official Results:

Final table
Place	Name	Prize
1st	(Germany) Ismael Bojang	€101,940
2nd	(Italy) Francesco Leotta	€75,690
3rd	(Russia) Vladimir Shabalin	€56,200
4th	(France) Johan Guilbert	€41,720
5th	(Poland) Dominik Panka	€30,970
6th	(Russia) Alexander Lakhov	€23,000
7th	(Israel) Daniel Portiansky	€17,070
8th	(Poland) Filip Demby	€12,670

* Deal at final table

=== (Slovenia) MINI IPT Nova Gorica ===
- Venue: Perla Casino & Hotel, Nova Gorica, Slovenia
- Buy-in: €330
- 6-Day Event: April 6-11, 2017
- Number of buy-ins: 439
- Guaranteed Prize Pool: €200,000
- Total Prize Pool: €200,000
- Number of Payouts: 39
- Official Results:

Final table
Place	Name	Prize
1st	(Italy) Daniele Caldarola	€38,353
2nd	(Serbia) Dragoljub Martinovic	€30,475
3rd	(Italy) Enzo Pin	€25,594
4th	(Italy) Francesco Intini	€24,876
5th	(Croatia) Paljic Dalibor	€10,000
6th	(Italy) Alberto Genta	€7,900
7th	(Italy) Guglielmo Di Benedetto	€6,300
8th	(Italy) Alberto Follador	€4,850

- Italian Poker Tour - Season 8 Champion: (Italy)
