= Union of Popular Movements (Italy) =

Union of Popular Movements Unione dei Movimenti Popolari
- Leader: Gianfranco Rotondi
- Founded: 1 March 2014
- Dissolved: July 2015
- Ideology: Christian democracy Conservatism
- Political position: Centre-right
- National affiliation: Forza Italia
- European affiliation: European People's Party
- European Parliament group: European People's Party

The Union of Popular Movements (Italian: Unione dei Movimenti Popolari, UMP) was the main Christian democratic faction of Forza Italia political party. Its leader is Gianfranco Rotondi, who was a member of the disbanded Christian Democracy and then a loyalist of the former Prime Minister Silvio Berlusconi.

== History ==
The faction was founded in 2014 by Rotondi and many Christian democrats and conservatives deputies of FI; Rotondi who want start a Shadow Cabinet (Governo Ombra) opposite to Renzi Cabinet and he is well-supported by the lot Christian democrats of Forza Italia, first of all Raffaele Fitto.

After the Fitto and Rotondi's split from Forza Italia in July 2015, the UMP was destablished.
