= Italian Poker Tour season 2 results =

Season 2 of Italian Series of poker tournaments sponsored by PokerStars

== Season 2 ==
Below are the results of the second season of the Italian Poker Tour (IPT) sponsored by PokerStars. For the second season, new destinations were added to the circuit, San Marino, Malta and Campione joining the already established stages of Sanremo, Venice and Nova Gorica.

=== IPT San Marino ===
- Venue: Centro Congressi San Marino, San Marino, Italy
- Buy-in: €2,200
- 5-Day Event: June 17–21, 2010
- Number of buy-ins: 380
- Total Prize Pool: €760,000
- Number of Payouts: 56
- Official Results:

Final table
Place	Name	Prize
1st	(Italy) Luigi Pignataro	€190,000
2nd	(Italy) Aldo Zambruno	€116,000
3rd	(Italy) Stefano Demontis	€74,000
4th	(Italy) Attilio Donato	€55,000
5th	(Italy) Giacomo Fundaro	€37,000
6th	(Italy) Simone Folini	€30,000
7th	(Italy) Mauro Cracolici	€22,000
8th	(Greece) Konstantinos Alexiou	€15,000

=== (Italy) IPT Venice ===
- Venue: Casino Di Venezia, Venice, Italy
- Buy-in: €2,200
- 5-Day Event: July 29-August 2, 2010
- Number of buy-ins: 505
- Total Prize Pool: €508,000
- Number of Payouts: 72
- Official Results:

Final table
Place	Name	Prize
1st	(Hungary) Tamas Lendvai	€235,000
2nd	(Italy) Davide Cerrato	€147,000
3rd	(Italy) Giovanni La Padula	€88,000
4th	(Italy) Cristiano Guerra	€59,000
5th	(Germany) Ali Tekintamgac	€46,000
6th	(Hungary) Andras Kovacs	€35,000
7th	(England) Toby Lewis	€25,000
8th	(Italy) Sandro Mazzei	€18,000

=== (Italy) IPT Sanremo I ===
- Venue: Casino Sanremo, Sanremo, Italy
- Buy-in: €2,200
- 5-Day Event: August 19–23, 2010
- Number of buy-ins: 396
- Total Prize Pool: €768,240
- Number of Payouts: 56
- Official Results:

Final table
Place	Name	Prize
1st	(Italy) Sergio Castelluccio	€200,000
2nd	(Italy) Stefano Demontis	€120,000
3rd	(Italy) Alberto Di Vilio	€77,000
4th	(Italy) Giuseppe De Blasio	€57,000
5th	(Italy) Matteo Taddia	€38,500
6th	(Italy) Salvatore Chillemi	€31,000
7th	(Italy) Christian Cipriano	€23,000
8th	(Italy) Alberto Palchetti	€15,140

=== (Slovenia) IPT Nova Gorica I ===
- Venue: Perla Casino & Hotel, Nova Gorica, Slovenia
- Buy-in: €2,200
- 5-Day Event: September 23–27, 2010
- Number of buy-ins: 384
- Total Prize Pool: €744,960
- Number of Payouts: 56
- Official Results:

Final table
Place	Name	Prize
1st	(Italy) Luca Topazio	€190,000
2nd	(Italy) Luciano Prevedello Delli Santi	€120,000
3rd	(Italy) Salvatore Bonavena	€75,000
4th	(Hungary) Peter Kamaras	€55,000
5th	(Italy) Lorenzo Fedeli	€36,000
6th	(Italy) Alessandro Minasi	€30,000
7th	(Italy) Giuseppe Orlando	€22,500
8th	(Italy) Davide Di Laurenzio	€15,460

=== (Italy) IPT Sanremo II ===
- Venue: Casino Sanremo, Sanremo, Italy
- Buy-in: €2,200
- 5-Day Event: October 14–18
- Number of buy-ins: 344
- Total Prize Pool: €688,000
- Number of Payouts: 48
- Official Results:

Final table
Place	Name	Prize
1st	(Italy) Alessandro Minasi	€172,000
2nd	(Lithuania) Aneris Adomkevicius	€110,000
3rd	(Italy) Paolo Rigano	€67,000
4th	(Italy) Claudio Cecchi	€50,000
5th	(Italy) Marco Ligato	€33,500
6th	(Hungary) Richard Scheili	€27,000
7th	(Hungary) Csaba Szasz	€20,000
8th	(Italy) Nicola Croce	€13,500

=== IPT Malta I ===
- Venue: Portomaso Casino, St. Julian's, Malta
- Buy-in: €2,200
- 6-Day Event: November 11–16, 2010
- Number of buy-ins: 385
- Total Prize Pool: €770,000
- Number of Payouts: 56
- Official Results:

Final table
Place	Name	Prize
1st	(Poland) Michal Polchlopek	€190,000
2nd	(Ukraine) Alexander Sharov	€120,000
3rd	(Sweden) Philip Sirback	€76,000
4th	(Sweden) Jesper Persson	€56,000
5th	(Italy) Edoardo Scimia	€36,000
6th	(Italy) Cipriano Basilio	€30,000
7th	(Italy) Roberto Tassi	€22,500
8th	(Italy) Sergio Castelluccio	€15,460

=== (Italy) IPT Sanremo III ===
- Venue: Casino Sanremo, Sanremo, Italy
- Buy-in: €2,200
- 5-Day Event: December 9–13, 2010
- Number of buy-ins: 342
- Total Prize Pool: €684,000
- Number of Payouts: 48
- Official Results:

Final table
Place	Name	Prize
1st	(Italy) Marcello Caponnetto	€170,000
2nd	(Italy) Riccardo Lacchinelli	€110,000
3rd	(Italy) Francesco Moro	€67,000
4th	(Italy) Vittore Brugnera	€50,000
5th	(Italy) Giovanni Maresca	€33,000
6th	(Italy) Alioscia Oliva	€27,000
7th	(Sweden) Johan Berg	€20,000
8th	(Finland) Jukka Juvonen	€13,000

=== (Italy) IPT Campione d'Italia ===
- Venue: Casino Campione d'Italia, Campione d'Italia, Italy
- Buy-in: €2,200
- 5-Day Event: January 20–24, 2011
- Number of buy-ins: 471
- Total Prize Pool: €942,000
- Number of Payouts: 72
- Official Results:

Final table
Place	Name	Prize
1st	(Italy) Eros Nastasi	€215,504
2nd	(Italy) Vincenzo Scarpitti	€134,883
3rd	(Italy) Davide Cerrato	€80,620
4th	(Italy) Marino Serenelli	€54,263
5th	(Italy) Gianni Bonetto	€42,636
6th	(Italy) Giuseppe Liotta	€31,395
7th	(Italy) Gianluca Betti	€22,480
8th	(Poland) Bartolomiej Kakol	€16,860

=== IPT Malta II ===
- Venue: Portomaso Casino, St. Julian's, Malta
- Buy-in: €2,200
- 5-Day Event: February 17–21, 2011
- Number of buy-ins: 237
- Total Prize Pool: €474,000
- Number of Payouts: 32
- Official Results:

Final table
Place	Name	Prize
1st	(Italy) Giacomo Loccarini	€122,000
2nd	(Italy) Alessio Isaia	€80,000
3rd	(Italy) Nicola D'Arrigo	€50,000
4th	(Italy) Gavino Virdis	€37,000
5th	(Italy) Gianluca Speranza	€23,000
6th	(Sweden) Pontus Khosravi	€18,000
7th	(Finland) Johan Mattsson	€14,000
8th	(Italy) Litterio Pirrotta	€11,500

=== (Slovenia) IPT Nova Gorica II ===
- Venue: Perla Casino & Hotel, Nova Gorica, Slovenia
- Buy-in: €2,200
- 5-Day Event: March 17–21, 2011
- Number of buy-ins: 396
- Total Prize Pool: €768,240
- Number of Payouts: 56
- Official Results:

Final table
Place	Name	Prize
1st	(Italy) Mustapha Kanit	€200,000
2nd	(Italy) Marco Mancini	€122,000
3rd	(Italy) Salvatore Castorina	€76,000
4th	(Italy) Enrico Fabrizi	€57,000
5th	(Italy) Daniele Scatragli	€38,000
6th	(Italy) Maurizio Cappanni	€30,500
7th	(Italy) Ciro Calabrese	€23,000
8th	(Italy) Massimiliano Di Paoloantonio	€15,600

- Italian Poker Tour - Season 2 Champion: (Hungary) Tamas Lendvai
