= Elections in Basilicata =

Elections in Italian region

This page gathers the results of elections in Basilicata.

== Regional elections ==
=== Latest regional election ===
In the latest regional election, which took place on 21-22 April 2024, incumbent president Vito Bardi of Forza Italia was re-elected at the head of a centre-right coalition, enlarged to Action and Italia Viva (within Lucanian Pride). Brothers of Italy was the largest party.

21–22 April 2024 Basilicata regional election results
Candidates	Votes	%	Seats	Parties	Votes	%	Seats
Vito Bardi	153,088	56.63	1	Brothers of Italy	45,458	17.39	4
Vito Bardi	153,088	56.63	1	Forza Italia	34,018	13.01	3
Vito Bardi	153,088	56.63	1	League	20,430	7.81	2
Vito Bardi	153,088	56.63	1	Action	19,646	7.51	2
Vito Bardi	153,088	56.63	1	Lucanian Pride (incl. IV)	18,371	7.03	1
Vito Bardi	153,088	56.63	1	Union of the Centre–DC–PU	6,636	2.54	–
Vito Bardi	153,088	56.63	1	True Basilicata	5,822	2.23	–
Vito Bardi	153,088	56.63	1	Total	150,381	57.52	12
Piero Marrese	113,979	42.16	1	Democratic Party	36,254	13.87	2
Piero Marrese	113,979	42.16	1	Common House Basilicata	29,228	11.88	2
Piero Marrese	113,979	42.16	1	Five Star Movement	20,026	7.66	2
Piero Marrese	113,979	42.16	1	Greens and Left Alliance–PSI–Possible Basilicata	15,144	5.79	1
Piero Marrese	113,979	42.16	1	United Basilicata	7,483	2.87	–
Piero Marrese	113,979	42.16	1	Total	108,135	41.36	7
Eustachio Follia	3,269	1.21	–	Volt Italy	2,947	1.13	–
Invalid votes	18,197	–					
Total candidates	270,336	100.00	2	Total parties	261,463	100.00	19
Registered voters	567,939	49.81					
Source: Ministry of the Interior – Results

=== List of previous regional elections ===
- 1970 Basilicata regional election
- 1975 Basilicata regional election
- 1980 Basilicata regional election
- 1985 Basilicata regional election
- 1990 Basilicata regional election
- 1995 Basilicata regional election
- 2000 Basilicata regional election
- 2005 Basilicata regional election
- 2010 Basilicata regional election
- 2013 Basilicata regional election
- 2019 Basilicata regional election
