= New CDU – United Christian Democrats =

Political party in Italy

New CDU – United Christian Democrats Nuovo CDU – Cristiani Democratici Uniti
- Secretary: Mario Tassone
- President: Antonio Iervolino
- Founded: 16 March 2014
- Split from: Union of the Centre
- Headquarters: Corso Vittorio Emanuele II 154, Rome
- Ideology: Christian democracy
- Political position: Centre
- Chamber of Deputies: 0 / 400
- Senate: 0 / 200
- European Parliament: 0 / 76
- Regional Councils: 1 / 896

Website
- www.nuovocdu.it

The New CDU – United Christian Democrats (Nuovo CDU – Cristiani Democratici Uniti) is a Christian democratic political party in Italy led by Mario Tassone. The party takes the name of the United Christian Democrats that existed from 1995 to 2002.

== History ==
After the disappointing results of the Union of the Centre in the 2013 Italian general election, Mario Tassone, in disagreement with the party strategies and on the alliance with Civic Choice, called the national council of the United Christian Democrats on 11 May 2013, although he declared that he had no intention of founding a new party. On 6 July 2013, Tassone was so referred to the arbitrators by the UDC's Calabrian regional committee for his expulsion. On 16 March 2014, in the fourth CDU congress, Tassone was appointed secretary of the reborn party, while up to that moment he had been president of the United Christian Democrats' association which had never been definitively dissolved.

The New CDU ran in the 2014 Calabrian regional election within the centre-left coalition; with 1.5% of the vote, it gained no seat. On the occasion of the 2018 Italian general election, the New CDU joined Us with Italy–UDC, without getting MPs. In the 2019 European Parliament election in Italy, the party joined the Populars for Italy list. On 31 August 2018, the New CDU joined the Federation of Christian Democracy, along with Christian Revolution, Christian Democracy, and other small Christian democratic parties.

On 19 December 2018, Gianfranco Rotondi, president of the Federation of Christian Democracy, Mario Tassone, secretary of the New CDU, Giorgio Merlo, leader of White Network and Renato Grassi, secretary of Christian Democracy (2012), signed a federative pact for the reconstitution of the historical Christian Democracy (1943–1994), which became a foundation on 8 June 2019.

In the 2025 regional elections in Campania, the New CDU joined the reformist Avanti Campania list put forward by the PSI, which, with 5.89% of the vote, contributed to Roberto Fico’s victory.
