= Grand Hotel Billia =

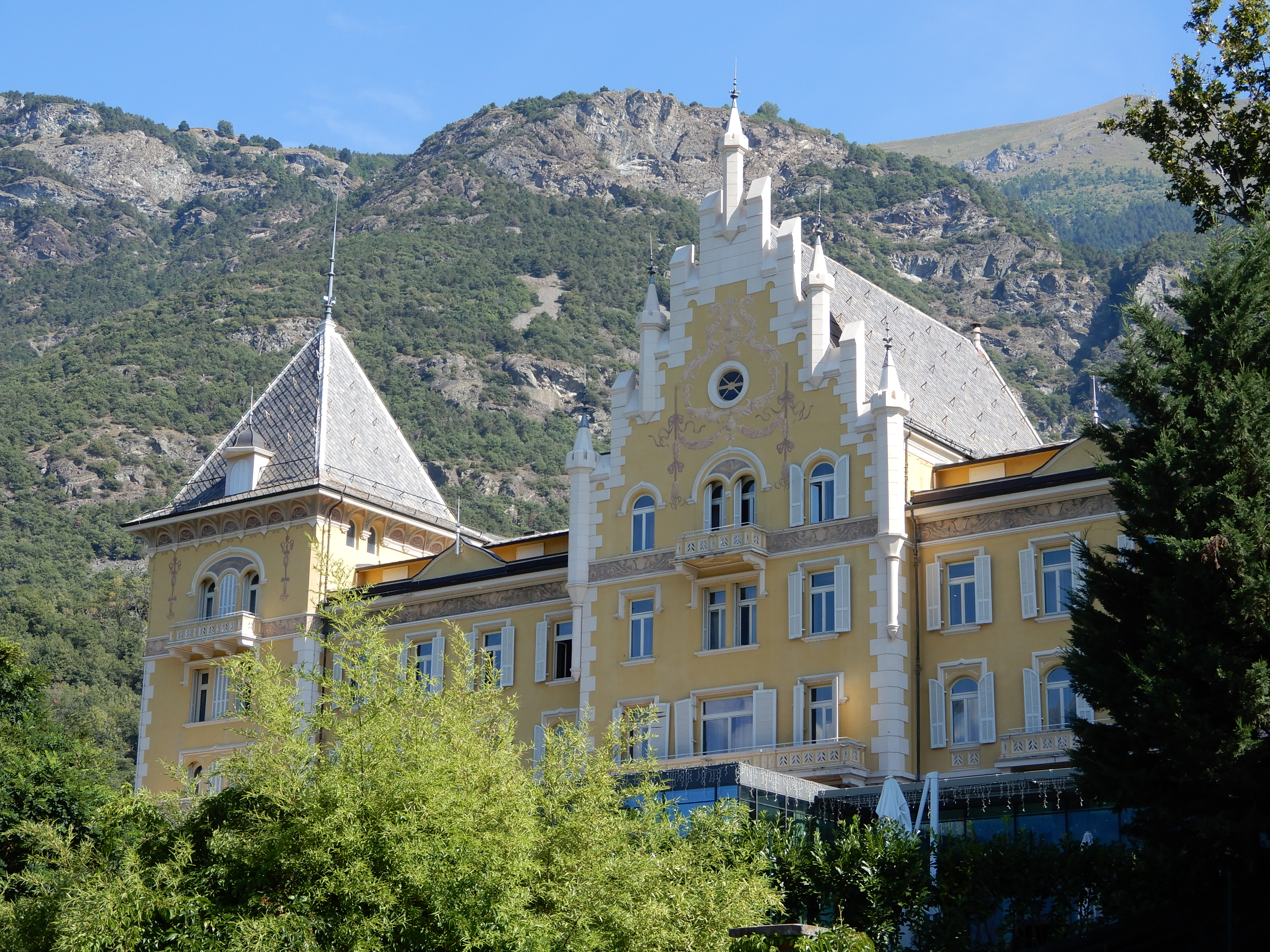
- Grand Hotel Billia in Aosta Valley, Italy
- Interactive map of the Grand Hotel Billia area

General information
- Location: Saint-Vincent, Italy
- Coordinates: 45°45′09.3″N 7°38′26.2″E
- Opened: 1908; 118 years ago

Website
- www.billia.it/en/

Grand Hotel Billia is a historic luxury hotel located in Saint-Vincent, Aosta Valley in Italy.

== History ==
The building was built in 1908 on behalf of Italian entrepreneur Stefano Billia, who already managed the stagecoach service between Ivrea and Saint-Vincent. At that time, Saint-Vincent was an emerging resort destination thanks to the renowned thermal waters of the Fons salutis. At its opening, the hotel had 138 rooms with a total of 200 beds.

After World War II, the building housed the Casino de la Vallée, which was inaugurated in its rooms on March 29, 1947.

== Description ==
The building features ornate façades.

== Gallery ==
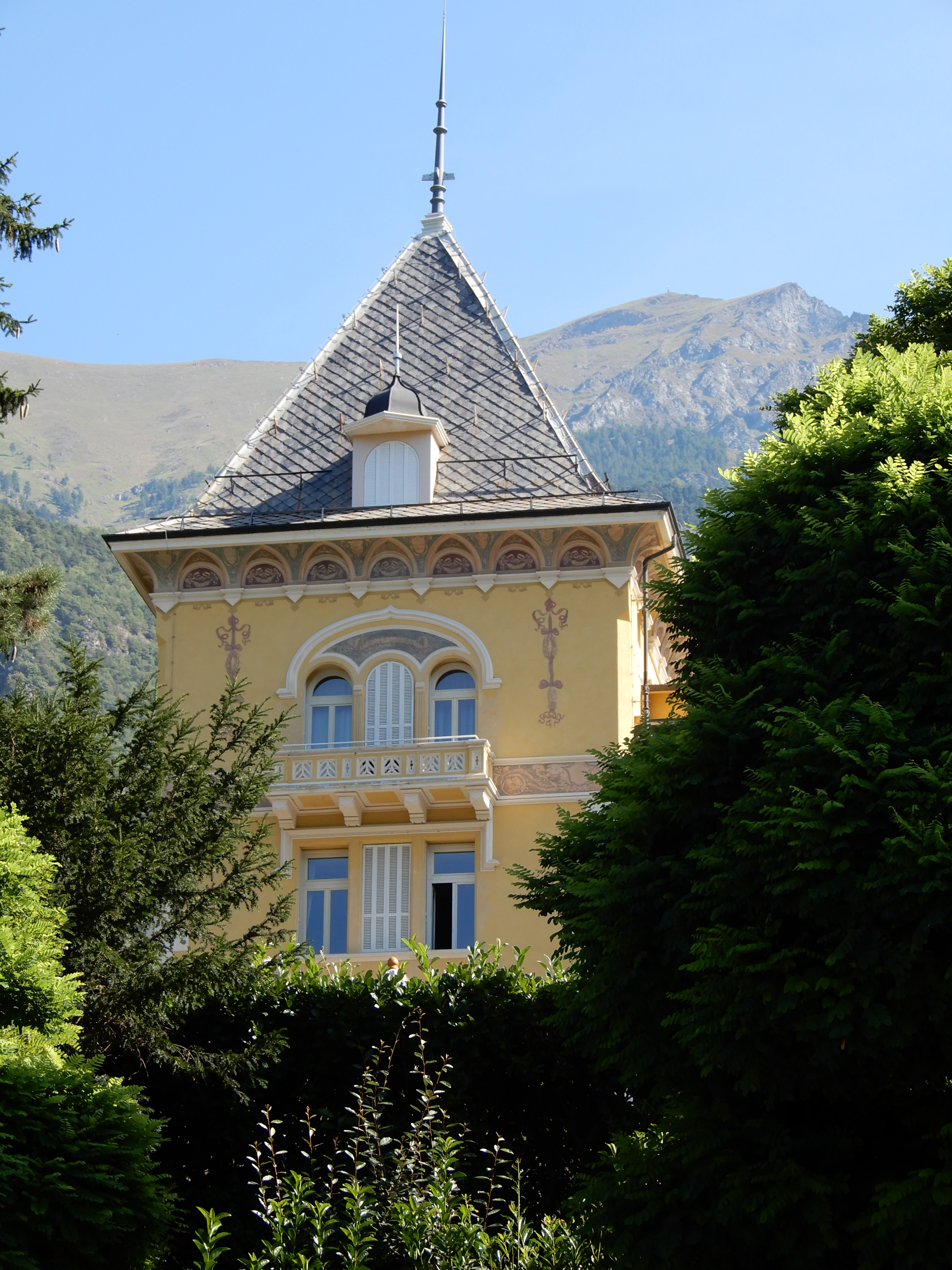

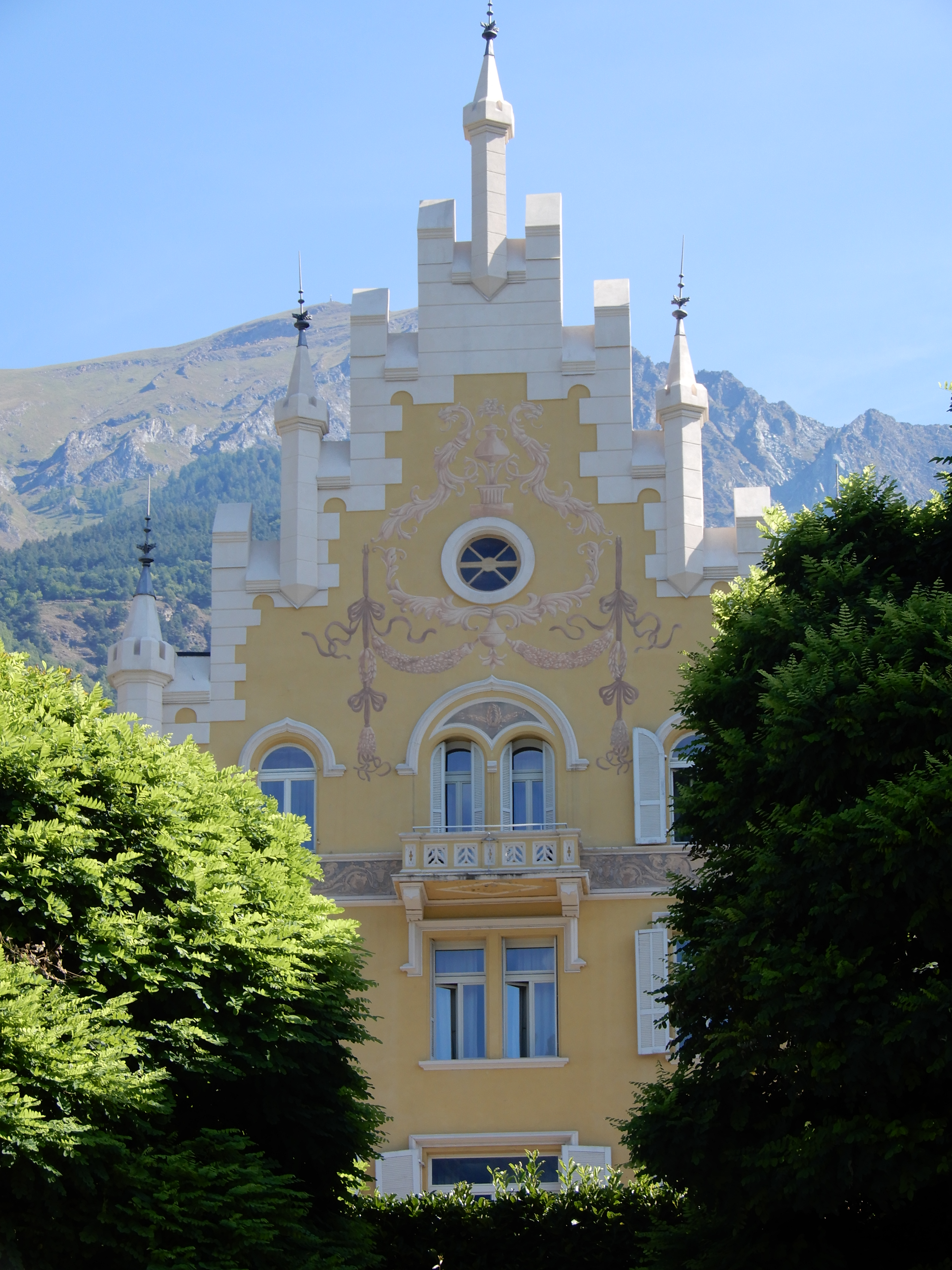

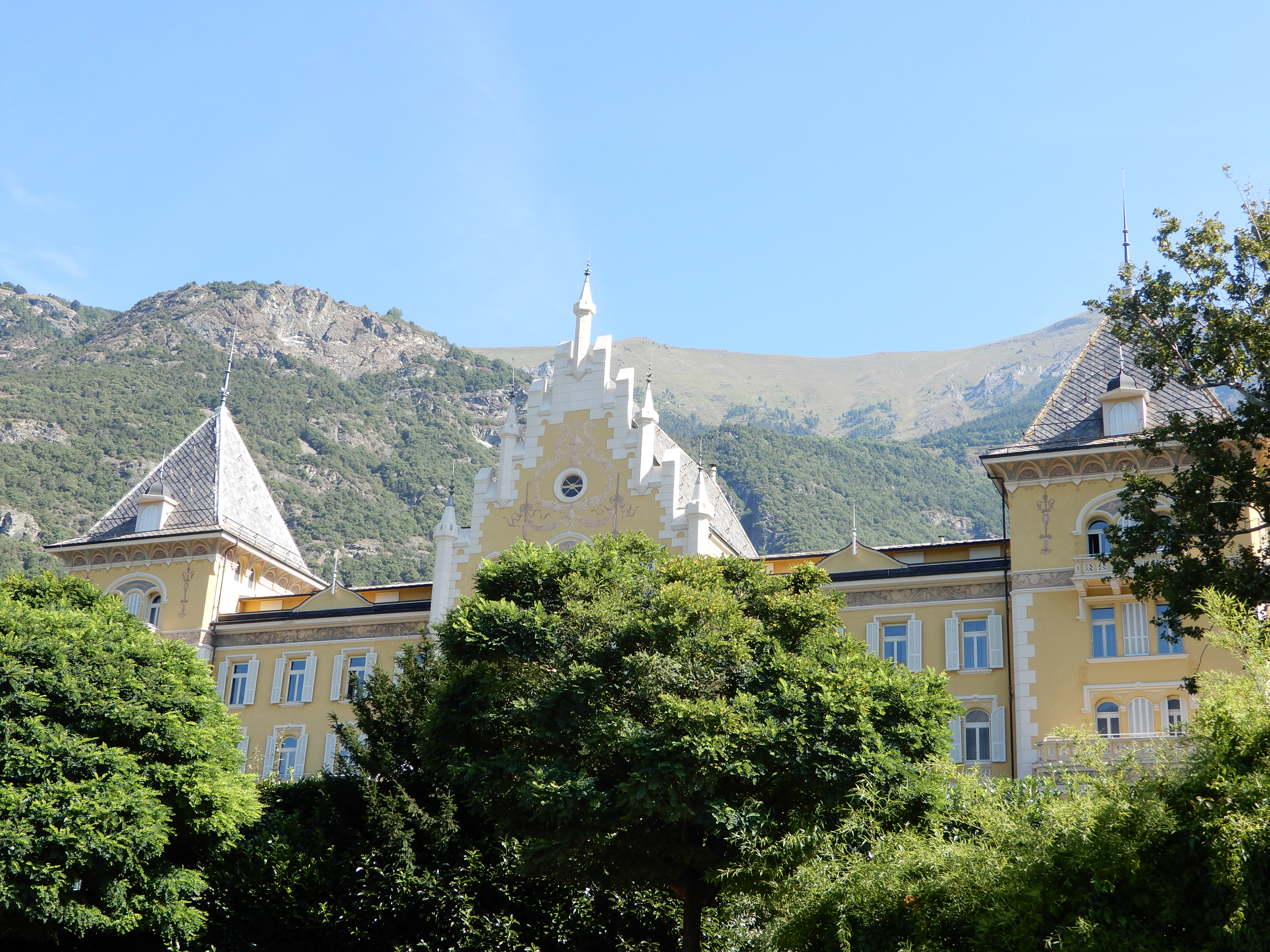
