= Popular Agreement =

Popular Agreement Intesa Popolare
- Secretary: Giampiero Catone
- President: Giuseppe Trieste
- Founded: 7 November 2012
- Dissolved: 2013 (de facto)
- Headquarters: Via Galileo Galilei, Pescara
- Ideology: Christian democracy Social conservatism
- Political position: Centre
- National affiliation: Centre-right coalition (2013)

Popular Agreement (Italian: Intesa Popolare, IP) was a small political party in Italy led by Giampiero Catone.

== History ==
Popular Agreement was founded in November 2012 by the deputy Giampiero Catone, member of the centre-right parliamentary group People and Territory. The party was born from the merger of 12 small political parties and associations: the clubs "La Discussione", the Democratic Alliance (Alleanza Democratica), the Christian Democracy – Third Pole of the Centre (Democrazia Cristiana – Terzo Polo di Centro), the Rebirth of Christian Democracy (Rinascita della Democrazia Cristiana), the Italian Christian Democrats (Cristiani Democratici Italiani), the Libertarian Right (Destra Libertaria), The Lotus (Il Loto), The Tulip (Il Tulipano), the Christian League (Lega Cristiana), the Italian Movement Young Europeans (Movimento Italiano Giovani Europei), the Party of the Land (Partito della Terra) and the Italian Catholic Pole (Polo Cattolico Italiano). The party was also joined by Giuseppe Trieste, that was appointed National President of the party, Vittorio Sgarbi (appointed spokesman) and Stefano Tacconi (appointed Deputy President).

Popular Agreement presented itself as the Catholic component of the centre-right coalition. The party participated in the general election of 2013 within the centre-right coalition led by Silvio Berlusconi, but it only received 0.08% of the vote and it didn't elect any MP.
