= Christian Democracy for Autonomies =

Italian political party

Christian Democracy for Autonomies Democrazia Cristiana per le Autonomie
- Secretary: Gianfranco Rotondi
- Deputy Secretary: Mauro Cutrufo
- Founded: 25 June 2005
- Dissolved: 27 March 2009
- Split from: Union of Christian and Centre Democrats
- Merged into: The People of Freedom
- Headquarters: Piazza del Gesù, 46; 00186 Rome
- Newspaper: La Discussione
- Ideology: Christian democracy
- National affiliation: House of Freedoms (2005–08); The People of Freedom (2008–09)

Website
- http://www.democraziacristiana perleautonomie.com

Christian Democracy for Autonomies (Italian: Democrazia Cristiana per le Autonomie, DCA) was a minor Christian-democratic political party in Italy, led by Gianfranco Rotondi. Later incarnations of the party, also led by Rotondi, include Christian Revolution, Green is Popular and Christian Democracy with Rotondi.

== History ==
DCA was founded on 25 October 2004 by a split from the Union of Christian and Centre Democrats (UDC) led by Gianfranco Rotondi, who wanted closer ties with Silvio Berlusconi's Forza Italia and who criticised the political line of the then-leader of UDC Marco Follini. The party became part of the centre-right coalition following its foundation.

The party was part of the House of Freedoms coalition in the 2006 general election, competing the election in an electoral list with the New Italian Socialist Party. The joint list gained 0.7% of the votes and, despite not having passed the 2% threshold, it still elected four deputies since it was the party which received more votes under the 2% in its coalition. Two of these deputies were members of DCA, while two more candidates were elected on the list of Forza Italia. Gianfranco Rotondi was too elected Senator on the list of Forza Italia, along with his colleague and deputy Mario Cutrufo.

DCA was part of The People of Freedom (PdL) list for the 2008 general election. On 3 April 2008, during a meeting in Milan, the party announced an alliance within the new party with the Liberal Populars of Carlo Giovanardi. After the election, in which the party got three deputies and one senator elected, Gianfranco Rotondi joined the Berlusconi IV Cabinet as Minister without portfolio.

In 2009 the DCA was eventually merged into the PdL and its members launched a network of circles named after the party's newspaper, La Discussione, led by Giampiero Catone. In October 2012, the balance of accounts of the People of Freedom showed that DCA had received €96,000 of financial support from PdL.

== Leadership ==
- Secretary: Gianfranco Rotondi (2005–2009)
  - Deputy-Secretary: Mauro Cutrufo (2005–2009)
  - Organization Secretary: Giampiero Catone (2005–2009)
- President: Publio Fiori (2005–2006)

== Symbols ==
Party logo

2006 general election
