= Giampiero Catone =

Italian politician

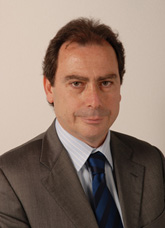

Member of the Chamber of Deputies
- In office 28 April 2006 – 14 March 2013
- Constituency: Lombardia 2 (XV); Campania 1 (XVI)

Personal details
- Born: 1 June 1956 (age 70) Naples, Italy
- Party: Christian Democratic Centre (1994–2002); Union of Christian and Centre Democrats (2002–2005); Christian Democracy for Autonomies (2005–2008); The People of Freedom (2008–2010); Future and Freedom (2010); Popular Agreement (2012–2013); Christian Revolution (2015–present)
- Education: D'Annunzio University of Chieti–Pescara
- Profession: Politician, journalist

Giampiero Catone (born 1 June 1956 in Naples, Campania) is an Italian politician and journalist.

== Biography ==
Giampiero Catone was born on 1 June 1956 in Naples. He graduated in Political Sciences at the D'Annunzio University of Chieti–Pescara.

In 2005, he became director for the political newspaper La Discussione. In the 2006 general election, Catone was elected in the Chamber of Deputies into the Forza Italia list and he joined the DCA-NPSI group.

In the 2008 general election Catone was again elected in the Chamber of Deputies with The People of Freedom. On 23 September 2010, he left the PDL's group to join Future and Freedom. On 14 December 2010 he decided to vote the trust to the Berlusconi Cabinet and he announced the abandonment of FLI, to switch to the mixed group.

On 20 January 2011 he joined the Responsible Initiative group and on 5 May he was appointed Undersecretary to the Ministry for the Environment, Land and Sea of the Berlusconi Cabinet.

In March 2012 Catone joined with his clubs "La Discussione" to the new Christian Democracy led by Gianni Fontana, while in November he founded Popular Agreement.

In the 2013 general election Catone was candidated with Popular Agreement into the centre-right coalition, but he was not re-elected.

On 9 May 2001, Catone was arrested together with his brother Massimo and other twelve people, only to be released the following day, along with all others, because the conditions for detention were not met. Catone was charged for two fraudulent bankruptcies by ₤25 billion each and the improper obtaining of ₤12 billion of non-repayable funding through the presentation of false documentation. On 23 February 2012 he was convicted in first instance. The verdict was overturned by the Italian Court of Cassation, which acquitted him, on 3 March 2015.

In 2003, he was indicted for the failure of Abatec, a company that manufactured diaper machines. Catone was acquitted for 9 of the 12 counts, while the remaining 3 were declared prescribed.
