= Christian Revolution =

Christian Revolution Rivoluzione Cristiana
- Secretary: Gianfranco Rotondi
- President: Federico Tedeschini
- Coordinator: Giampiero Catone
- Founded: 27 June 2015
- Dissolved: c. 2018
- Headquarters: Via Ulpiano 29, Rome
- Ideology: Christian democracy
- Political position: Centre
- National affiliation: Forza Italia (2015–2018)

Website
- www.rivoluzionecristiana.it

Christian Revolution (Italian: Rivoluzione Cristiana) was a Christian democratic political party in Italy led by Gianfranco Rotondi. The party was affiliated with Forza Italia.

== History ==
The party was founded on 27 June 2015 by the deputy of Forza Italia Gianfranco Rotondi. According to Rotondi, the political project of Christian Revolution is founded on the belief that there is still room for a force of Christian inspiration after the end of the Christian Democracy.

On 6 July 2018 Rotondi announced the foundation of the Federation of Christian Democracy, with the adhesion of Christian Revolution, Angelo Sandri's Christian Democracy and other small Christian democratic parties. Rotondi was appointed coordinator of the federation. On 31 August 2018 the political activity of Christian Revolution was suspended, when the new Christian Democracy was launched in Pescara, with Rotondi as President of the party, Angelo Sandri as Vicar Deputy President, Franco De Simoni as Deputy President and Giampiero Catone as coordinator.

On 19 December 2018 Gianfranco Rotondi, president of the Federation of Christian Democracy, Mario Tassone, secretary of the New CDU, Giorgio Merlo, leader of White Network and Renato Grassi, secretary of the historical Christian Democracy, signed a federative pact for the reconstitution of the Christian Democracy. On 8 June 2019, the Christian Democracy ceased its activities as a party and became a foundation, with Rotondi and Rocco Buttiglione as its guide.
