= Paola Balducci =

Italian politician (born 1949)

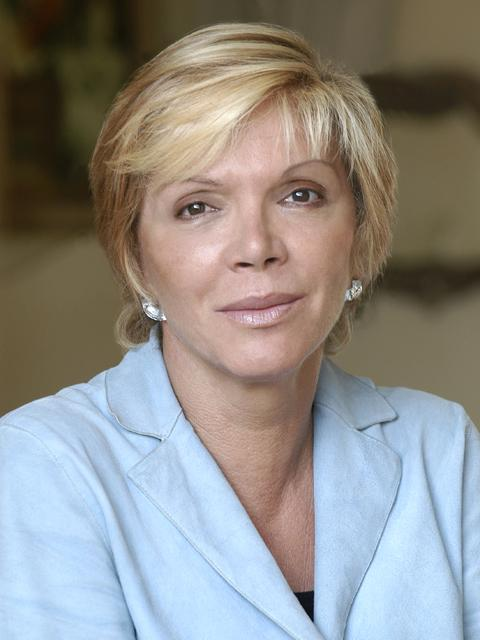

Member of the CSM
- In office 23 September 2014 – 27 September 2018

Member of the Chamber of Deputies
- In office 4 July 2006 – 28 April 2008

Personal details
- Born: 14 November 1949 (age 76) Rome, Italy
- Party: Greens (2006-2009); SEL (2010-2016)
- Education: Sapienza University of Rome
- Occupation: Lawyer, jurist, politician

Paola Balducci (born 14 November 1949) is an Italian lawyer and politician, member of the High Council of the Judiciary from 2014 to 2018.

== Biography ==
A student of Giovanni Conso and Giuliano Vassalli, Balducci graduated in law at the Sapienza University of Rome and later became an associate professor of Criminal Procedural Law at the University of Salento.

Since 1976, Balducci has worked as a lawyer and has been registered in the special register of Cassation officials since 1990.

In 2002, the Federation of the Greens nominated her as the party candidate for a seat at the High Council of the Judiciary, obtaining 105 votes, too few to be elected by the Parliament in a joint session.

From May 2005 to June 2006 she held the office of Regional Councilor for the Right to Education, with powers to the university, public education, scientific research and cultural heritage, in Apulia, under the first presidency of Nichi Vendola.

=== Member of Parliament ===
In the 2006 general elections, Balducci is a candidate for the Chamber of Deputies on the lists of the Federation of the Greens in the Lazio and Apulia constituencies, and was the first of the non-elected members of the latter, though on 4 July 2006, following the resignation of Domenico Lomelo (who preceded her on the list), after having been appointed new Regional Councilor for the Right to Education in Apulia, she took over his seat was elected deputy.

In the 2008 general elections, Balducci ran again for a seat at the Chamber of Deputies, in the Lazio constituency, on the list of The Left – The Rainbow, but was not re-elected as the list did not exceed the 4% threshold at national level.

=== Member of the High Council of the Judiciary ===
On 23 September 2014, with 521 votes, she was elected member of the High Council of the Judiciary by the Parliament in a joint session, being the official candidate of Left Ecology Freedom, and held her seat until the renewal of the council on 27 September 2018.
