= Gianni Fontana =

Italian politician and lawyer (born 1944)

Giovanni Angelo Fontana
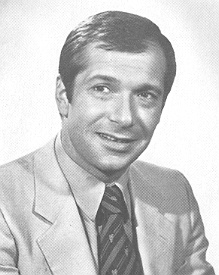

Minister of Agriculture
- In office 28 June 1992 – 21 March 1993
- Prime Minister: Giuliano Amato
- Preceded by: Giovanni Goria
- Succeeded by: Alfredo Diana

Member of the Senate of the Republic
- In office 2 July 1987 – 14 April 1994
- Constituency: Veneto

Member of the Chamber of Deputies
- In office 25 May 1972 – 1 July 1987
- Constituency: Veneto

Personal details
- Born: 1 April 1944 (age 82) Verona, Veneto, Italy
- Party: DC (until 1994); DC (since 2012)
- Education: University of Modena and Reggio Emilia
- Profession: Politician, lawyer

Giovanni Angelo Fontana (born 1 April 1944) is an Italian politician and lawyer.

== Biography ==
Born in Verona, Fontana graduated in law from the University of Modena and Reggio Emilia. He was elected for the first time in Parliament in 1972. He also served many times as Undersecretary to the Ministries of Public Works, Transport and Industry.

On 28 June 1992, he was appointed Minister of Agriculture and Forestry in the first Amato government, but he resigned on 21 March 1993, the guarantee notice for handling stolen goods and violating the law on party financing.

On 30 March 2012, the National Council of Christian Democracy, convened on the initiative of Clelio Darida and 48 other national councilors who held this role in 1994, elected Giovanni Angelo Fontana to the office of national secretary of the party. The XIX Congress of the DC, held on 10 and 11 November 2012, confirmed Fontana as party secretary. In 2018 Fontana was succeeded by Renato Grassi as secretary of DC and he became President of National Council of the party.
