= Mario Tassone =

Italian politician (born 1943)

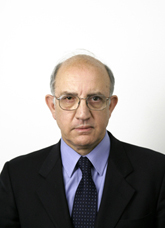

Member of the Chamber of Deputies
- In office 5 July 1976 – 14 April 1994
- Constituency: Catanzaro-Cosenza-Reggio Calabria (VII – VIII – IX – X – XI); Catanzaro (XIV); Calabria (XIII – XIV – XV – XVI)
- In office 9 May 1996 – 14 March 2013

Personal details
- Born: 8 August 1943 (age 82) Castrovillari, Italy
- Party: DC (until 1994); PPI (1994–1995); CDU (1995–1998); UDR (1998–1999); CDU (1999–2002); UDC (2002–2013); New CDU (2013–present)
- Profession: Politician, lawyer

Mario Tassone (born 8 August 1943 in Castrovillari, Calabria) is an Italian politician and lawyer.

== Biography ==
Tassone was member of the Chamber of Deputies from 1976 to 1994 and from 1996 to 2013. He served as Undersecretary to the Ministry of Public Works in the First and Second Craxi government and in the Sixth Fanfani government. He also served as Deputy Minister of Infrastructure and Transport in the Second and Third Berlusconi government.

He was member of the Christian Democracy until its dissolution, subsequently he joined the PPI, the CDU and the Union of Christian and Centre Democrats.

On 11 May 2013, Tassone, in disagreement with the strategies of the Union of the Centre for the alliance with Civic Choice, called the national council of the CDU. After being referred to the arbitrators by the party's Calabrian regional committee, he left the UDC and founded the New CDU.
