= Gianfranco Rotondi =

Italian politician (born 1960)

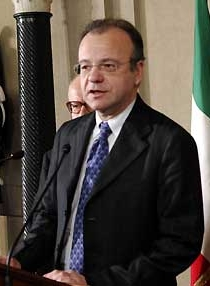

Minister for the Implementation of the Government Program
- In office 13 June 2008 – 16 November 2011
- Prime Minister: Silvio Berlusconi
- Preceded by: Giulio Santagata
- Succeeded by: Dino Piero Giarda

Member of the Chamber of Deputies
- Incumbent
- Assumed office 29 April 2008
- In office 30 May 2001 – 27 April 2006
- In office 15 April 1994 – 8 May 1996

Member of the Senate of the Republic
- In office 28 April 2006 – 28 April 2008

Personal details
- Born: 25 July 1960 (age 66) Avellino, Italy
- Party: DCR (since 2023)
- Other political affiliations: DC (1975–1994); PPI (1994–1995); CDU (1995–2002); UDC (2002–2005); DCA (2005–2009); PdL (2009–2013); FI (2013–2015); RC (2015–2018); DC (2018–2021); VèP (2021–2023)
- Height: 1.78 m (5 ft 10 in)
- Spouse: Maria Grazia Spatola
- Children: Mariangela, Daria, and Federica
- Education: University of Salerno
- Profession: Politician, journalist

Gianfranco Rotondi (born 25 July 1960) is an Italian politician. A member of the Italian Parliament since 1994, he was a member of the Chamber of Deputies from 1994 to 1996, from 2001 to 2006, and since 2008, as well as a member of the Senate of the Republic from 2006 to 2008. He was also a Minister without Portfolio for the Implementation of the Government Program in the fourth Berlusconi government from 2008 to 2011.

== Career ==
Born in Avellino, Rotondi graduated in law. A journalist by profession, Rotondi was elected to the Regional Council of Campania in 1990 for Christian Democracy (DC). After the DC's dissolution, he continued to be active in the DC's successors and Christian-democratic political parties, first of all the Italian People's Party.

In 2001, Rotondi was elected to the Chamber of Deputies for the House of Freedoms in the single-seat constituency of Rho, and he has since been elected either to the Chamber of Deputies or the Senate of the Republic for centre-right coalition political parties. Hailing from the United Christian Democrats (CDU), Rotondi was originally affiliated with the White Flower alliance, which later evolved into the Union of Christian and Centre Democrats (UDC).

In 2005, Rotondi left the UDC over disagreements about the relationship with the Forza Italia political party of Silvio Berlusconi, to whom Rotondi wanted to be closer. He then established a new party strongly inspired by Christian ideals and the defunct DC, namely Christian Democracy for Autonomies (DCA), which ran in a joint list with the New Italian Socialist Party (NPSI) in 2006. In 2009, the DCA was merged into The People of Freedom (PdL), and Rotondi was appointed Minister without Portfolio for the Implementation of the Government Program in the fourth Berlusconi government, a position he held until 2011. Within the PdL and later the new Forza Italia, Rotondi established an associate party named Christian Revolution.

From 2018 to 2021, Rotondi established a new DC party. In 2021, Rotondi launched a new party named Green is Popular, combining Christian democracy and green conservatism. Soon after that, he expressed his support for Giorgia Meloni of Brothers of Italy (FdI) ahead of the 2022 Italian general election, where he ran within the Us Moderates (NM) electoral list of FdI. In 2023, Rotondi established a new full-fledged Christian-democratic party, which continued to be aligned with FdI, namely Christian Democracy with Rotondi (DCR).
