= Italian Poker Tour =

Series of poker tournaments sponsored by PokerStars

- Sport: Texas Hold 'em
- Founded: 2009
- Continent: Europe
- Website: https://web.archive.org/web/20170819125933/http://www.pokerstarsipt.com/coverage/

The Italian Poker Tour (IPT) was a series of poker tournaments sponsored by PokerStars. The tour was created in 2009 and has held tournaments in Italy (Campione d'Italia, Sanremo, Saint Vincent and Venice), Malta, Slovenia (Nova Gorica) and San Marino.

== Season 1 ==
Date	Event / City	Players	Prize Pool	Winner	Prize	Results
June 5–7, 2009	IPT Sanremo I €2,200; Casino Sanremo, Sanremo, Italy	254	€508,000	(Italy) Stefano Puccilli	€120,000	
July 30-August 2, 2009	IPT Venice I €2,200; Casino Di Venezia, Venice, Italy	439	€851,660	(England) Matt Perrins	€150,000	
August 27–31, 2009	IPT Sanremo II €2,200; Casino Sanremo, Sanremo, Italy	368	€713,920	(Sweden) Ramzi Jelassi	€170,000	
October 8–12, 2009	IPT Nova Gorica I €2,200; Perla Casino & Hotel, Nova Gorica, Slovenia	332	€664,000	(Italy) Marco Figuccia	€160,000	
November 12–16, 2009	IPT Sanremo III €2,200; Casino Sanremo, Sanremo, Italy	325	€670,000	(Italy) Giovanni Salvatore	€150,000	
December 10–14, 2009	IPT Sanremo IV €2,200; Casino Sanremo, Sanremo, Italy	273	€529,620	(Italy) Alessio Isaia	€140,000	
January 14–18, 2010	IPT Venice II €2,200; Casino di Venezia, Venice, Italy	310	€600,000	(Italy) Salvatore Bonavena	€155,000	
February 25-March 1, 2010	IPT Sanremo V €2,200; Casino Sanremo, Sanremo, Italy	488	€976,000	(Hungary) Valdemar Kwaysser	€227,000	
March 18–22, 2010	IPT Nova Gorica II €2,200; Perla Casino & Hotel, Nova Gorica, Slovenia	393	€762,420	(Italy) Giuseppe Di Cicco	€200,000	

- Italian Poker Tour - Season 1 Champion: (Italy) Giannino Salvatore

== Season 2 ==
Date	Event / City	Players	Prize Pool	Winner	Prize	Results
June 17–21, 2010	IPT San Marino €2,200; Centro Congressi San Marino, San Marino, Italy	380	€760,000	(Italy) Luigi Pignataro	€190,000	
July 29-August 2, 2010	IPT Venice €2,200; Casino Di Venezia, Venice, Italy	505	€508,000	(Hungary) Tamas Lendvai	€235,000	
August 19–23, 2010	IPT Sanremo I €2,200; Casino Sanremo, Sanremo, Italy	396	€768,240	(Italy) Sergio Castelluccio	€200,000	
September 23–27, 2010	IPT Nova Gorica I €2,200; Perla Casino & Hotel, Nova Gorica, Slovenia	384	€744,960	(Italy) Luca Topazio	€190,000	
October 14–18, 2010	IPT Sanremo II €2,200; Casino Sanremo, Sanremo, Italy	344	€688,000	(Italy) Alessandro Minasi	€172,000	
November 11–16, 2010	IPT Malta I €2,200; Portomaso Casino, St. Julian's, Malta	385	€770,000	(Poland) Michal Polchlopek	€190,000	
December 9–13, 2010	IPT Sanremo III €2,200; Casino Sanremo, Sanremo, Italy	342	€684,000	(Italy) Marcello Caponnetto	€170,000	
January 20–24, 2011	IPT Campione d'Italia €2,200; Casino Campione d'Italia, Campione d'Italia, Italy	471	€942,000	(Italy) Eros Nastasi	€215,504	
February 17–21, 2011	IPT Malta II €2,200; Portomaso Casino, St. Julian's, Malta	237	€474,000	(Italy) Giacomo Loccarini	€122,000	
March 17–21, 2011	IPT Nova Gorica II €2,200; Perla Casino & Hotel, Nova Gorica, Slovenia	396	€768,240	(Italy) Mustapha Kanit	€200,000	

- Italian Poker Tour - Season 2 Champion: (Hungary) Tamas Lendvai
- MINI Italian Poker Tour - Season 2 Champion: (Italy) Vincenzo Natale

== Season 3 ==
Date	Event / City	Players	Prize Pool	Winner	Prize	Results
June 23–27, 2011	IPT Campione I CHF2,607 (~€2,193); Casino Campione d'Italia, Campione d'Italia, Italy	391	CHF 898,870 (~€756,129)	(Italy) Domenico Cordi	CHF 230,000 (~€193,476)	
July 28-August 1, 2011	IPT Sanremo I €2,200; Casino Sanremo, Sanremo, Italy	426	€826,440	(Italy) Luca Pagano	€210,000	
September 1–5, 2011	IPT Nova Gorica I €2,200; Perla Casino & Hotel, Nova Gorica, Slovenia	287	€556,780	(Ukraine) Oleksii Kovalchuk	€150,000	
September 29-October 3, 2011	MINI IPT San Marino €400; Giochi Del Titano, San Marino	494	€172,505	(Italy) Guido Pieraccini	€32,400	
November 24–28, 2011	IPT Campione II CHF2,200 (~€1,793); Casino Campione d'Italia, Campione d'Italia, Italy	482	CHF 951,200 (~€775,436)	(Italy) Danilo Donnini	CHF 221,000 (~€180,163)	
January 26–30, 2012	IPT Sanremo II €2,200; Casino Sanremo, Sanremo, Italy	350	€679,000	(Ukraine) Oleksii Kovalchuk	€175,000	
March 1–5, 2012	IPT Nova Gorica I €2,200; Perla Casino & Hotel, Nova Gorica, Slovenia	286	€554,840	(Slovakia) Anton Karasinsky	€140,000	
March 21–26, 2012	IPT Campione II CHF400 (~€332); Casino Campione d'Italia, Campione d'Italia, Italy	465	CHF 194,040 (~€160,916)	(Italy) Gianni Racitti	CHF 46,000 (~€38,147)	
May 3–7, 2012	IPT Sanremo GRAND FINAL €2,200; Casino Sanremo, Sanremo, Italy	418	€810,920	(Italy) Davide Biscardi	€176,000	

- Italian Poker Tour - Season 3 Champion: (Ukraine) Oleksii Kovalchuk
- MINI Italian Poker Tour - Season 3 Champion: (Italy) Andrea Ferrari
- Ladies - Season 3 leaderboard: (Italy) Noemi Palumbo

== Season 4 ==
Date	Event / City	Players	Prize Pool	Winner	Prize	Results
May 24–28, 2012	IPT Campione I CHF2,618 (~€2,180); Casino Campione d'Italia, Campione d'Italia, Italy	224	CHF 517,126 (~€430,333)	(Italy) Antonino Venneri	CHF 130,000 (~€108,181)	
July 26–30, 2012	IPT Sanremo I €2,200; Casino Sanremo, Sanremo, Italy	375	€727,500	(Italy) Alessandro Meoni	€166,000	
August 30-September 3, 2012	IPT Campione II CHF2,618 (~€2,179); Casino Campione d'Italia, Campione d'Italia, Italy	282	CHF 671,160 (~€558,870)	(Italy) Manlio Iemina	CHF 154,000 (~€128,235)	
November 15–19, 2012	IPT Nova Gorica €2,200; Perla Casino & Hotel, Nova Gorica, Slovenia	298	€578,120	(Italy) Riccardo D'Antoni	€155,000	
January 10–14, 2013	IPT Campione III CHF2,629 (~€2,171); Casino Campione d'Italia, Campione d'Italia, Italy	385	CHF 892,544 (~€736,884)	(Italy) Andrea Montini	CHF 200,000 (~€165,120)	
February 28-March 4, 2013	IPT Saint-Vincent €2,200; Saint-Vincent Resort & Casino, Saint-Vincent, Italy	358	€694,520	(Italy) Luca Moschitta	€180,000	
May 2–6, 2013	IPT Sanremo GRAND FINAL €2,200; Casino Sanremo, Sanremo, Italy	428	€830,320	(Italy) Nicola Sasso	€185,000	

- Italian Poker Tour - Season 4 Champion: (Italy) Ivan Losi
- MINI Italian Poker Tour - Season 4 Champion: (Italy) Gianvalerio Bindi
- Ladies - Season 4 leaderboard: (Italy) Nadia Angeli

== Season 5 ==
Date	Event / City	Players	Prize Pool	Winner	Prize	Results
June 13–17, 2013	IPT San Marino €2,200; Centro Congressi San Marino, San Marino, Italy	154	€298,760	(Italy) Antonio Bernaudo	€65,580	
July 25–29, 2013	IPT Sanremo I €2,200; Casino Sanremo, Sanremo, Italy	246	€492,000	(Italy) Fabrizio Piva	€121,000	
August 22–27, 2013	IPT Nova Gorica €700; Perla Casino & Hotel, Nova Gorica, Slovenia	715	€450,450	(Italy) Claudio Di Giacomo	€90,000	
October 24–29, 2013	IPT Sanremo II €700; Casino Sanremo, Sanremo, Italy	1,010	€617,211	(Italy) Federico Piroddi	€125,000	
November 28-December 3, 2013	IPT Saint-Vincent GRAND FINAL €700; Saint-Vincent Resort & Casino, Saint-Vincent, Italy	914	€575,820	(Italy) Domenico Drammis	€130,000	

- Italian Poker Tour - Season 5 Champion: (Italy) Domenico Drammis - Prize: Sponsorship package covering season 6 IPT
- MINI Italian Poker Tour - Season 5 Champion: (Lithuania) Martynas Miliauskas - Prize: Sponsorship package covering season 6 IPT
- Satéllite IPT and MINI IPT - Season 5 leaderboard: (Italy) Igor "SMagicS-84" Saia - Prize: One EPT Package value €6,500

== Season 6 ==
Date	Event / City	Players	Prize Pool	Winner	Prize	Results
January 16–21, 2014	IPT Nova Gorica I €700; Perla Casino & Hotel, Nova Gorica, Slovenia	710	€433,881	(Serbia) Marko Mikovic	€89,000	
February 27-March 4, 2014	IPT Saint-Vincent I €700; Saint-Vincent Resort & Casino, Saint-Vincent, Italy	635	€388,049	(Italy) Walter Treccarichi	€87,500	
April 9–14, 2014	EPT / IPT Sanremo I €770; Casino Sanremo, Sanremo, Italy	1,124	€763,196	(Italy) Alessandro De Fenza	€105,600	
July 24–28, 2014	IPT Saint-Vincent II €1,100; Saint-Vincent Resort & Casino, Saint-Vincent, Italy	363	€352,110	(Italy) Massimo Pellegrino	€65,000	
September 4–8, 2014	IPT Sanremo II €1,100; Casino Sanremo, Sanremo, Italy	392	€380,240	(Italy) Riccardo Lacchinelli	€70,500	
October 23–27, 2014	IPT Nova Gorica II €1,100; Perla Casino & Hotel, Nova Gorica, Slovenia	333	€333,000	(Italy) Igor Saia	€70,000	
November 27-December 1, 2014	IPT Sanremo GRAND FINAL €990; Casino Sanremo, Sanremo, Italy	234	€204,282	(Italy) Alessio Isaia	€43,000	

- Italian Poker Tour - Season 6 Champion: (Italy) Niccolò Ceccarelli - Prize: Sponsorship package covering season 7 IPT
- MINI Italian Poker Tour - Season 6 Champion: (Lithuania) Martynas Miliauskas - Prize: Sponsorship package covering season 7 IPT

== Season 7 ==
Date	Event / City	Players	Prize Pool	Winner	Prize	Results
March 18–23, 2015	EPT / IPT Malta €1,100 ortomaso Casino, St. Julian's, Malta	1,285	€1,246,450	(Greece) Georgios Zisimopoulos	€142,205	
April 23–28, 2015	MINI IPT Saint-Vincent I €330; PokerStars LIVE ROOM at Saint-Vincent Resort & Casino, Saint-Vincent, Italy	775	€225,525	(Switzerland) Jean-Marc Bellini	€42,000	
July 23–28, 2015	MINI IPT Saint-Vincent II €330; PokerStars LIVE ROOM at Saint-Vincent Resort & Casino, Saint-Vincent, Italy	829	€248,700	(Italy) Alessandro Spadaccini	€33,739	
July 30 - August 3, 2015	IPT Saint-Vincent III €1,100; PokerStars LIVE ROOM at Saint-Vincent Resort & Casino, Saint-Vincent, Italy	390	€378,300	(Italy) Alessandro Adinolfo	€80,000	
September 10–14, 2015	IPT Nova Gorica €1,100; Perla Casino & Hotel, Nova Gorica, Slovenia	265	€257,050	(Italy) Matteo Mutti	€80,000	
October 21–25, 2015	EPT / IPT Malta €1,100 ortomaso Casino, St. Julian's, Malta	947	€918,590	(Belgium) Natan Chauskin	€149,560	
November 20–24, 2015	MINI IPT Saint-Vincent GRAND FINAL €330; PokerStars LIVE ROOM at Saint-Vincent Resort & Casino, Saint-Vincent, Italy	640	€186,240	(Italy) Alessandro Minasi	€30,000	
January 21–25, 2016	IPT Saint-Vincent GRAND FINAL €1,100; PokerStars LIVE ROOM at Saint-Vincent Resort & Casino, Saint-Vincent, Italy	308	€298,760	(Hungary) Balazs Somodi	€70,000	

- Italian Poker Tour - Season 7 GOLD: (Canada) Yann Dion
- Italian Poker Tour - Season 7 SILVER: (Czech Republic) Jiri Desmo Horak

== Season 8 ==
Date	Event / City	Players	Prize Pool	Winner	Prize	Results
May 11–16, 2016	IPT Saint-Vincent I €1,100; PokerStars LIVE ROOM at Saint-Vincent Resort & Casino, Saint-Vincent, Italy	260	€252,200	(Switzerland) Eric Joss	€47,000	
July 14–19, 2016	MINI IPT Saint-Vincent II €330; PokerStars LIVE ROOM at Saint-Vincent Resort & Casino, Saint-Vincent, Italy	508	€150,000	(Italy) Diego Raimondi	€22,000	
August 3,8, 2016	IPT Saint-Vincent III; KO EDITION €600 + €500 KO; PokerStars LIVE ROOM at Saint-Vincent Resort & Casino, Saint-Vincent, Italy	370	€179,450 + €179,450 KO	(Italy) Francesco Elefante	€28,500 + €11,500 KO	
October 19–23, 2016	EPT / IPT Malta €1,100; Portomaso Casino, St. Julian's, Malta	775	€751,750	(Germany) Ismael Bojang	€101,940	
April 6–11, 2017	MINI IPT Nova Gorica €330; Perla Casino & Hotel, Nova Gorica, Slovenia	439	€200,000	(Italy) Daniele Caldarola	€38,353	

- Italian Poker Tour - Season 8 Champion: (Italy) (tbc)
