= Saint-Vincent, Aosta Valley =

Saint-Vincent Sèn-Veuncein (Valdôtain) Finze (Walser)
- Comune
- Comune di Saint-Vincent; Commune de Saint-Vincent
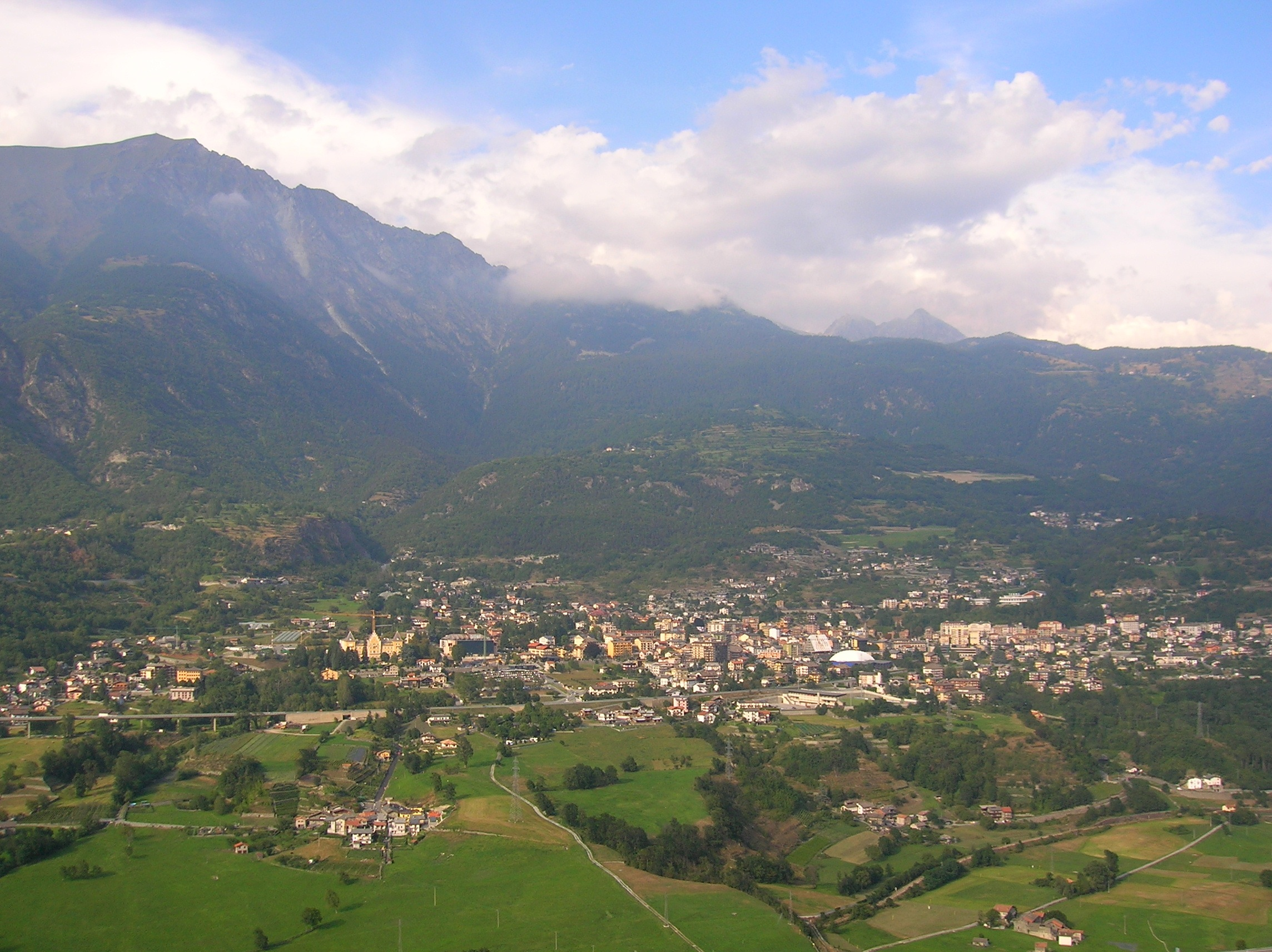
- Saint-Vincent as seen from the Ussel Castle.

- Location within Italy Location within Aosta Valley
- Coordinates: 45°45′N 7°39′E
- Country: Italy
- Region: Aosta Valley
- Province: none
- Frazioni: Amay, Amay-Lotoz, Bacon, Biègne, Biéton, Boriolaz, Capard, Chadel, Champbilly, Champcillien, Champ-de-Vigne, Cillian, Clapéaz, Clapéon, Crétamianaz, Crotache, Crovion, Cugnon, Diseille, Écrevin, Feilley, La Fet, Fromy, Gléréyaz, Grand-Rhun, Grun, Jacques, Joux, Linty, Lérinon, Maison-Neuve, Marc, Les Montagnets, Moron, Moron-Charbonnier, Moron-la-Combaz, Moron-Gorris, Moron-Hugonet, Moron-Toules, Moron-le-Treuil, Les Moulins, Nouarsaz, Orioux, Palud, Pérélaz, Perrière, Petit-Rhun, Planet, Piémartin, Pioule, Le Grand-Pré, Pradiran, Pradiran-Champlan, Pradiran-Gorris, Renard, Romillod, Romillod-Capard, Romilod-Crotache, Le Ronc-Dessous, Le Ronc-Dessus, Salirod, Tensoz (Teinsod[1]), Torrent-Sec, La Tour-des-Rosset, Valmignanaz, Valpélanaz, Valère, Verney

Area
  - Total: 20 km^{2} (7.7 sq mi)
- Elevation: 550 m (1,800 ft)

Population (31 December 2022)
  - Total: 4,448
  - Density: 220/km^{2} (580/sq mi)
- Demonym: Sabins
- Time zone: UTC+1 (CET)
  - Summer (DST): UTC+2 (CEST)
- Postal code: 11027
- Dialing code: 0166
- Patron saint: Vincent of Saragossa
- Saint day: 22 January
- Website: Official website

Saint-Vincent (French: [sɛ̃ vɛ̃sɑ̃]; Valdôtain: Sèn-Veuncein; Issime Walser: Finze) is a town and comune in the Aosta Valley region of north-western Italy. Saint-Vincent, elevation 575 metres (1,886 ft), is a popular summer holiday resort with mineral springs, and home to one of four casinos in Italy.

== Geography ==
The town is bounded by Ayas, Brusson, Châtillon, Émarèse and Montjovet.

== See also ==
- Grand Hotel Billia
- Grolla d'oro
